= 1966 United States House of Representatives elections =

House elections for the 90th U.S. Congress

- November 8, 1966

All 435 seats in the United States House of Representatives 218 seats needed for a majority
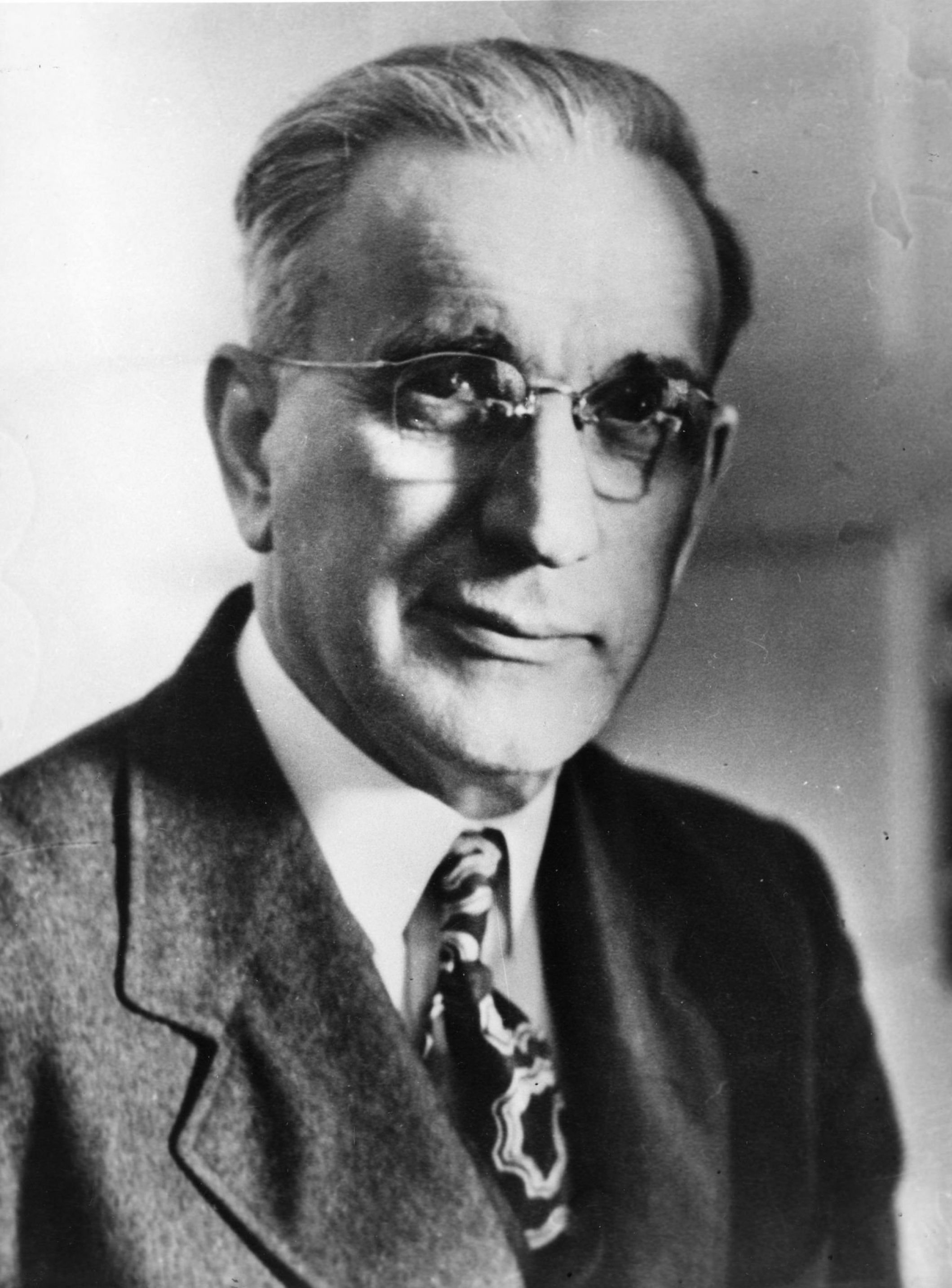

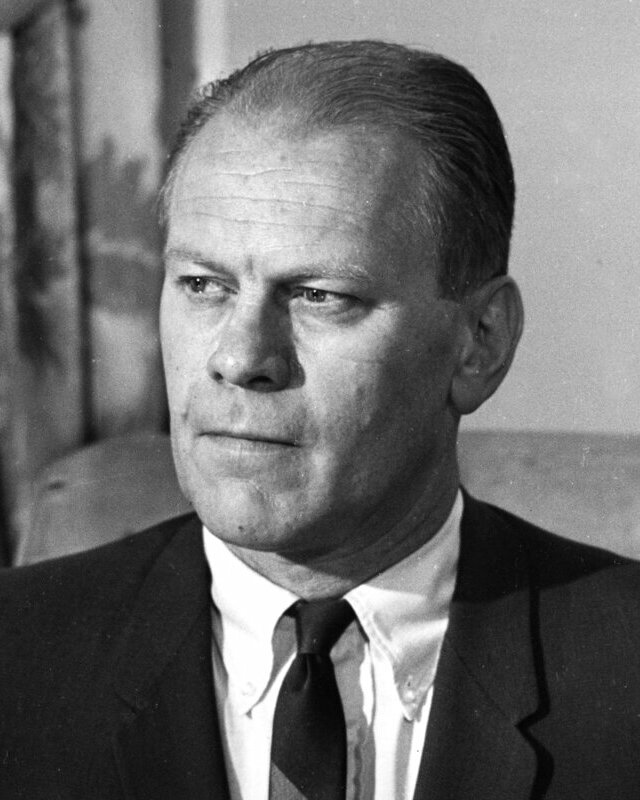
	Majority party	Minority party
Leader	John McCormack	Gerald Ford
Party	Democratic	Republican
Leader since	January 10, 1962	January 3, 1965
Leader's seat	Massachusetts 9th	Michigan 5th
Last election	295 seats	140 seats
Seats won	248	187
Seat change	▼47	▲47
Popular vote	26,934,136	25,521,157
Percentage	50.9%	48.2%
Swing	▼6.2pp	▲5.8pp
- Results: Democratic hold Democratic gain Republican hold Republican gain
Speaker before election
John McCormack
Democratic
Elected Speaker
John McCormack
Democratic

The 1966 United States House of Representatives elections was an election for the United States House of Representatives on November 8, 1966, to elect members to serve in the 90th United States Congress. They occurred in the middle of President Lyndon B. Johnson's second term. As the Vietnam War continued to escalate and race riots exploded in cities across the country, Johnson's popularity had fallen, and the opposition Republican Party was able to gain a net of 47 seats from Johnson's Democratic Party, which nonetheless maintained a clear majority in the House. This was also the first election that occurred after the Voting Rights Act of 1965 became law, the first time since 1870 that a Republican won a House seat in Arkansas, and the first since 1876 that the party did so in South Carolina (after the same in a 1965 special election for the seat).

== Republican gains ==
- Alaska's at-large congressional district: four-term Democratic incumbent Ralph Rivers was defeated by Republican State Senator Howard Pollock.
- Arizona's 3rd congressional district: sophomore Democrat George F. Senner Jr. was defeated by state legislator Sam Steiger.
- Arkansas's 3rd congressional district: lumber executive and Arkansas GOP chair John Paul Hammerschmidt defeated incumbent James William Trimble, becoming the first Republican member of Arkansas' congressional delegation since Reconstruction.
- California's 18th congressional district: onetime Olympic gold medalist Bob Mathias defeated seven-term Democratic incumbent Harlan Hagen.
- California's 25th congressional district: Charles E. Wiggins defeated incumbent Democrat Ronald B. Cameron.
- California's 33rd congressional district: Jerry Pettis defeated incumbent Kenneth W. Dyal.
- Michigan's 2nd congressional district: Marvin Esch defeated incumbent Democrat Weston E. Vivian.
- Michigan's 3rd congressional district: Garry E. Brown defeated incumbent Democrat Paul H. Todd Jr..
- Michigan's 7th congressional district: Donald Riegle defeated incumbent Democrat John C. Mackie.
- Michigan's 11th congressional district: Philip Ruppe defeated incumbent Democrat Raymond Clevenger.
- Michigan's 19th congressional district: Jack H. McDonald defeated incumbent Democrat Billie S. Farnum.
- Texas's 7th congressional district: businessman and 1964 U.S. Senate candidate George H. W. Bush defeated Democratic challenger Frank Briscoe for the seat vacated by John Dowdy (whose district had been renumbered the 2nd).
- Texas's 18th congressional district: Bob Price succeeded retiring Democrat Walter E. Rogers by defeating Dee Miller.

== Special elections ==
Elections are listed by date and district.

District	Incumbent			This race	
District	Member	Party	First elected	Results	Candidates
North Carolina 1	Herbert Covington Bonner	Democratic	1940	Incumbent died November 7, 1965. New member elected February 5, 1966. Democratic hold; winner was later re-elected.	▌ ✓ Walter B. Jones Sr. (Democratic) 60.3%; ▌John Porter East (Republican) 39.7%
New York 17	John Lindsay	Republican	1958	Incumbent resigned December 31, 1965 to become Mayor of New York City. New member elected February 8, 1966. Republican hold; winner was later re-elected.	▌ ✓ Theodore R. Kupferman (Republican) 46.4%; ▌Orin Lehman (Democratic) 45.4%; ▌Jeffrey St. John (Conservative) 8.2%
Texas 8	Albert Thomas	Democratic	1936	Incumbent died February 15, 1966. New member elected March 26, 1966. Democratic hold; winner did not seek re-election.	▌ ✓ Lera Millard Thomas (Democratic) 74%; ▌Louis Leman (Republican) 26%
California 14	John F. Baldwin Jr.	Republican	1954	Incumbent died March 9, 1966. New member elected June 7, 1966. Democratic gain; winner was later re-elected.	▌ ✓ Jerome Waldie (Democratic) 51.2%; ▌Frank Newman (Republican) 31.2%; ▌John A. Richardson (Republican) 10.6%; ▌Leo A. Costa (Democratic) 4.3%; ▌Doris G. Johnston (Republican) 1.6%; ▌Talluk B. Wrakstad (Republican) 1.2%

== Overall results ==
411 incumbent members sought reelection, but 8 were defeated in primaries and 41 defeated in the general election for a total of 362 incumbents winning.

↓
248	187
Democrat	Republican

Parties	Seats				Popular Vote		
Parties	1964	1966	Change	Strength	Vote	%	Change
Democratic Party	295	248	▼47	57.0%	26,934,136	50.9%	▼6.2%
Republican Party	140	187	▲47	43.0%	25,521,157	48.2%	▲5.8%
Conservative Party	–	–	–	–	208,756	0.4%	▲0.3%
Independent	–	–	–	–	85,641	0.2%	Steady
Liberal Party	–	–	–	–	75,303	0.1%	▼0.1%
Peace and Freedom Party	–	–	–	–	16,922	<0.1%	Steady
American Independent Party	–	–	–	–	14,461	<0.1%	Steady
Constitution Party	–	–	–	–	11,110	<0.1%	Steady
Socialist Labor Party	–	–	–	–	5,771	<0.1%	Steady
Independent-Socialist Party	–	–	–	–	3,502	<0.1%	Steady
New Hispano Party	–	–	–	–	2,263	<0.1%	Steady
People's Choice Party	–	–	–	–	1,299	<0.1%	Steady
Socialist Workers Party	–	–	–	–	1,014	<0.1%	Steady
Veteran Party	–	–	–	–	939	<0.1%	Steady
Others	–	–	–	–	29,701	0.1%	▲0.1%
Total	435	435	0	100.0%	52,901,975	100.0%	——

Source: Election Statistics – Office of the Clerk

Popular vote
Democratic	50.91%
Republican	48.24%
Others	0.85%

House seats
Democratic	57.01%
Republican	42.99%

^{1} One vacancy due to refusal of House to seat Adam Clayton Powell Jr. (D-New York)

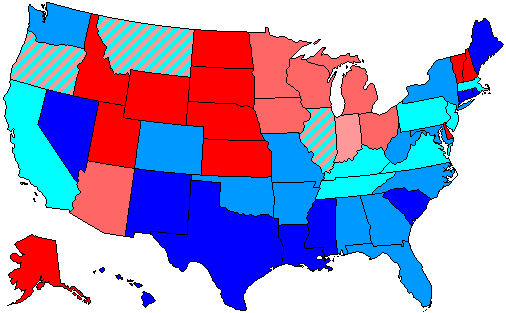
House seats by party holding plurality in state: 80+% to 100% Democratic / 80+% to 100% Republican; 60+% to 80% Democratic / 60+% to 80% Republican; ≤ 60% Democratic / ≤ 60% Republican

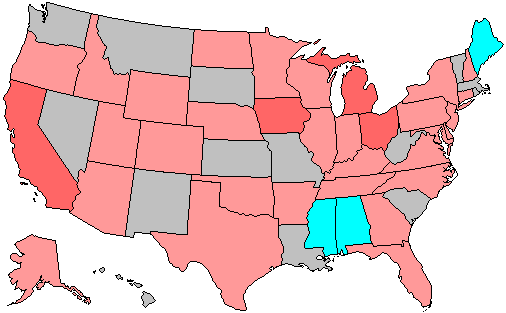
6+ Democratic gain / 6+ Republican gain; 3-5 Democratic gain / 3-5 Republican gain; 1-2 Democratic gain / 1-2 Republican gain; no net change

== Alabama ==
District	Incumbent			This race	
District	Member	Party	First elected	Results	Candidates
Alabama 1	Jack Edwards	Republican	1964	Incumbent re-elected.	▌ ✓ Jack Edwards (Republican) 65.8%; ▌Warren L. Finch (Democratic) 34.2%
Alabama 2	William L. Dickinson	Republican	1964	Incumbent re-elected.	▌ ✓ William L. Dickinson (Republican) 54.6%; ▌Robert F. Whaley (Democratic) 45.4%
Alabama 3	George W. Andrews	Democratic	1944	Incumbent re-elected.	▌ ✓ George W. Andrews (Democratic) Unopposed
Alabama 4	Glenn Andrews	Republican	1964	Incumbent lost re-election. Democratic gain.	▌ ✓ Bill Nichols (Democratic) 58.4%; ▌Glenn Andrews (Republican) 41.6%
Alabama 5	Armistead I. Selden Jr.	Democratic	1952	Incumbent re-elected.	▌ ✓ Armistead I. Selden Jr. (Democratic) Unopposed
Alabama 6	John H. Buchanan Jr.	Republican	1964	Incumbent re-elected.	▌ ✓ John H. Buchanan Jr. (Republican) 63.4%; ▌Walter Emmett Perry (Democratic) 36.6%
Alabama 7	James D. Martin	Republican	1964	Incumbent retired to run for Governor of Alabama. Democratic gain.	▌ ✓ Tom Bevill (Democratic) 64.4%; ▌Wayman Sherrer (Republican) 35.6%
Alabama 8	Robert E. Jones Jr.	Democratic	1947 (special)	Incumbent re-elected.	▌ ✓ Robert E. Jones Jr. (Democratic) 72.2%; ▌Don Mayhall (Republican) 27.8%

== Alaska ==
State House Results

District	Incumbent			This race	
District	Member	Party	First elected	Results	Candidates
Alaska at-large	Ralph Rivers	Democratic	1958	Incumbent lost re-election. Republican gain.	▌ ✓ Howard Pollock (Republican) 51.6%; ▌Ralph Rivers (Democratic) 48.4%

== Arizona ==
District	Incumbent			This race	
District	Member	Party	First elected	Results	Candidates
Arizona 1	John Jacob Rhodes	Republican	1952	Incumbent re-elected.	▌ ✓ John Jacob Rhodes (Republican) 67.1%; ▌L. Alton Riggs (Democratic) 32.9%
Arizona 2	Mo Udall	Democratic	1961 (special)	Incumbent re-elected.	▌ ✓ Mo Udall (Democratic) 59.6%; ▌G. Alfred McGinnis (Republican) 40.4%
Arizona 3	George F. Senner Jr.	Democratic	1962	Incumbent lost re-election. Republican gain.	▌ ✓ Sam Steiger (Republican) 56.9%; ▌George F. Senner Jr. (Democratic) 43.1%

== Arkansas ==
District	Incumbent			This race	
District	Member	Party	First elected	Results	Candidates
Arkansas 1	Ezekiel C. Gathings	Democratic	1938	Incumbent re-elected.	▌ ✓ Ezekiel C. Gathings (Democratic) Unopposed
Arkansas 2	Wilbur Mills	Democratic	1938	Incumbent re-elected.	▌ ✓ Wilbur Mills (Democratic) Unopposed
Arkansas 3	James William Trimble	Democratic	1944	Incumbent lost re-election. Republican gain.	▌ ✓ John Paul Hammerschmidt (Republican) 53.1%; ▌James William Trimble (Democratic) 46.9%
Arkansas 4	Oren Harris	Democratic	1940	Incumbent resigned to become district judge. Democratic hold.	▌ ✓ David Pryor (Democratic) 65.0%; ▌Lynn Lowe (Republican) 35.0%

== California ==
District	Incumbent			This race	
District	Member	Party	First elected	Results	Candidates
California 1	Don Clausen	Republican	1963 (special)	Incumbent re-elected.	▌ ✓ Don Clausen (Republican) 65.1%; ▌Thomas T. Storer (Democratic) 34.9%
California 2	Bizz Johnson	Democratic	1958	Incumbent re-elected.	▌ ✓ Bizz Johnson (Democratic) 70.9%; ▌William H. Romack Jr. (Republican) 29.1%
California 3	John E. Moss	Democratic	1952	Incumbent re-elected.	▌ ✓ John E. Moss (Democratic) 67.5%; ▌Terry G. Feil (Republican) 32.5%
California 4	Robert Leggett	Democratic	1962	Incumbent re-elected.	▌ ✓ Robert Leggett (Democratic) 59.5%; ▌Tom McHatton (Republican) 40.5%
California 5	Phillip Burton	Democratic	1964	Incumbent re-elected.	▌ ✓ Phillip Burton (Democratic) 71.3%; ▌Terry R. Macken (Republican) 28.7%
California 6	William S. Mailliard	Republican	1952	Incumbent re-elected.	▌ ✓ William S. Mailliard (Republican) 76.6%; ▌Le Rue Grim (Democratic) 23.4%
California 7	Jeffery Cohelan	Democratic	1958	Incumbent re-elected.	▌ ✓ Jeffery Cohelan (Democratic) 64.4%; ▌Malcolm M. Champlin (Republican) 35.6%
California 8	George P. Miller	Democratic	1944	Incumbent re-elected.	▌ ✓ George P. Miller (Democratic) 65.4%; ▌Raymond P. Britton (Republican) 34.6%
California 9	Don Edwards	Democratic	1962	Incumbent re-elected.	▌ ✓ Don Edwards (Democratic) 63.2%; ▌Wilbur G. Durkee (Republican) 36.8%
California 10	Charles Gubser	Republican	1952	Incumbent re-elected.	▌ ✓ Charles Gubser (Republican) 69.1%; ▌George Leppert (Democratic) 30.9%
California 11	J. Arthur Younger	Republican	1952	Incumbent re-elected.	▌ ✓ J. Arthur Younger (Republican) 59.4%; ▌W. Mark Sullivan (Democratic) 40.6%
California 12	Burt Talcott	Republican	1962	Incumbent re-elected.	▌ ✓ Burt Talcott (Republican) 77.3%; ▌Gerald V. Barron (Democratic) 22.7%
California 13	Charles M. Teague	Republican	1954	Incumbent re-elected.	▌ ✓ Charles M. Teague (Republican) 67.5%; ▌Charles A. Storke (Democratic) 32.5%
California 14	Jerome Waldie	Democratic	1966	Incumbent re-elected.	▌ ✓ Jerome Waldie (Democratic) 56.4%; ▌Frank Newman (Republican) 43.6%
California 15	John J. McFall	Democratic	1956	Incumbent re-elected.	▌ ✓ John J. McFall (Democratic) 57.0%; ▌Sam Van Dyken (Republican) 43.0%
California 16	B. F. Sisk	Democratic	1954	Incumbent re-elected.	▌ ✓ B. F. Sisk (Democratic) 71.4%; ▌Cecil F. White (Republican) 28.6%
California 17	Cecil R. King	Democratic	1942	Incumbent re-elected.	▌ ✓ Cecil R. King (Democratic) 60.8%; ▌Don Cortum (Republican) 39.2%
California 18	Harlan Hagen	Democratic	1952	Incumbent lost re-election. Republican gain.	▌ ✓ Bob Mathias (Republican) 55.9%; ▌Harlan Hagen (Democratic) 44.1%
California 19	Chet Holifield	Democratic	1942	Incumbent re-elected.	▌ ✓ Chet Holifield (Democratic) 62.3%; ▌William R. Sutton (Republican) 37.7%
California 20	H. Allen Smith	Republican	1956	Incumbent re-elected.	▌ ✓ H. Allen Smith (Republican) 73.4%; ▌Raymond Freschi (Democratic) 26.6%
California 21	Augustus Hawkins	Democratic	1962	Incumbent re-elected.	▌ ✓ Augustus Hawkins (Democratic) 84.8%; ▌Rayfield Lundy (Republican) 15.2%
California 22	James C. Corman	Democratic	1960	Incumbent re-elected.	▌ ✓ James C. Corman (Democratic) 53.5%; ▌Bob Cline (Republican) 46.5%
California 23	Del M. Clawson	Republican	1963 (special)	Incumbent re-elected.	▌ ✓ Del M. Clawson (Republican) 67.4%; ▌Ed O'Connor (Democratic) 32.6%
California 24	Glenard P. Lipscomb	Republican	1953 (special)	Incumbent re-elected.	▌ ✓ Glenard P. Lipscomb (Republican) 76.3%; ▌Earl G. McNall (Democratic) 23.7%
California 25	Ronald B. Cameron	Democratic	1962	Incumbent lost re-election. Republican gain.	▌ ✓ Charles E. Wiggins (Republican) 52.6%; ▌Ronald B. Cameron (Democratic) 47.4%
California 26	Thomas M. Rees	Democratic	1965 (special)	Incumbent re-elected.	▌ ✓ Thomas M. Rees (Democratic) 62.3%; ▌Irving Teichner (Republican) 37.7%
California 27	Edwin Reinecke	Republican	1964	Incumbent re-elected.	▌ ✓ Edwin Reinecke (Republican) 65.3%; ▌John A. "Jack" Howard (Democratic) 34.7%
California 28	Alphonzo E. Bell Jr.	Republican	1960	Incumbent re-elected.	▌ ✓ Alphonzo E. Bell Jr. (Republican) 72.3%; ▌Lawrence "Lorry" Sherman (Democratic) 27.7%
California 29	George Brown Jr.	Democratic	1962	Incumbent re-elected.	▌ ✓ George Brown Jr. (Democratic) 51.1%; ▌Bill Orozco (Republican) 48.9%
California 30	Edward R. Roybal	Democratic	1962	Incumbent re-elected.	▌ ✓ Edward R. Roybal (Democratic) 66.4%; ▌Henri O'Bryant Jr. (Republican) 33.6%
California 31	Charles H. Wilson	Democratic	1962	Incumbent re-elected.	▌ ✓ Charles H. Wilson (Democratic) 63.4%; ▌Theodore Smith (Republican) 36.6%
California 32	Craig Hosmer	Republican	1952	Incumbent re-elected.	▌ ✓ Craig Hosmer (Republican) 80.1%; ▌Tracy Odell (Democratic) 19.9%
California 33	Kenneth W. Dyal	Democratic	1964	Incumbent lost re-election. Republican gain.	▌ ✓ Jerry Pettis (Republican) 53.5%; ▌Kenneth W. Dyal (Democratic) 46.5%
California 34	Richard T. Hanna	Democratic	1962	Incumbent re-elected.	▌ ✓ Richard T. Hanna (Democratic) 55.8%; ▌Frank LaMagna (Republican) 44.2%
California 35	James B. Utt	Republican	1952	Incumbent re-elected.	▌ ✓ James B. Utt (Republican) 73.1%; ▌Thomas B. Lenhart (Democratic) 26.9%
California 36	Bob Wilson	Republican	1952	Incumbent re-elected.	▌ ✓ Bob Wilson (Republican) 72.9%; ▌William C. Godfrey (Democratic) 27.1%
California 37	Lionel Van Deerlin	Democratic	1962	Incumbent re-elected.	▌ ✓ Lionel Van Deerlin (Democratic) 61.2%; ▌Samuel S. Vener (Republican) 38.8%
California 38	John V. Tunney	Democratic	1964	Incumbent re-elected.	▌ ✓ John V. Tunney (Democratic) 54.5%; ▌Robert R. Barry (Republican) 45.5%

== Colorado ==
District	Incumbent			This race	
District	Member	Party	First elected	Results	Candidates
Colorado 1	Byron G. Rogers	Democratic	1950	Incumbent re-elected.	▌ ✓ Byron G. Rogers (Democratic) 56.0%; ▌Greg Pearson (Republican) 44.0%
Colorado 2	Roy H. McVicker	Democratic	1964	Incumbent lost re-election. Republican gain.	▌ ✓ Donald G. Brotzman (Republican) 51.7%; ▌Roy H. McVicker (Democratic) 47.1%; ▌Joe Lucero (New Hispano) 1.2%
Colorado 3	Frank Evans	Democratic	1964	Incumbent re-elected.	▌ ✓ Frank Evans (Democratic) 51.7%; ▌David W. Enoch (Republican) 48.3%
Colorado 4	Wayne N. Aspinall	Democratic	1948	Incumbent re-elected.	▌ ✓ Wayne N. Aspinall (Democratic) 58.6%; ▌James Paul Johnson (Republican) 41.4%

== Connecticut ==
District	Incumbent			This race	
District	Member	Party	First elected	Results	Candidates
Connecticut 1	Emilio Q. Daddario	Democratic	1958	Incumbent re-elected.	▌ ✓ Emilio Q. Daddario (Democratic) 58.0%; ▌John L. Bonee (Republican) 41.2%; ▌Donald B. LaCroix (People's Choice) 0.8%
Connecticut 2	William St. Onge	Democratic	1962	Incumbent re-elected.	▌ ✓ William St. Onge (Democratic) 56.2%; ▌Joseph H. Goldberg (Republican) 43.2%; ▌Daniel R. Tarasevich (Veteran) 0.6%
Connecticut 3	Robert Giaimo	Democratic	1958	Incumbent re-elected.	▌ ✓ Robert Giaimo (Democratic) 53.1%; ▌Stelio Salmona (Republican) 41.5%; ▌Robert M. Cook (American Independent) 5.4%
Connecticut 4	Donald J. Irwin	Democratic	1958; 1960 (lost); 1964	Incumbent re-elected.	▌ ✓ Donald J. Irwin (Democratic) 51.0%; ▌Abner W. Sibal (Republican) 49.0%
Connecticut 5	John S. Monagan	Democratic	1958	Incumbent re-elected.	▌ ✓ John S. Monagan (Democratic) 59.1%; ▌Romeo G. Petroni (Republican) 40.9%
Connecticut 6	Bernard F. Grabowski	Democratic	1962	Incumbent lost re-election. Republican gain.	▌ ✓ Thomas Meskill (Republican) 48.9%; ▌Bernard F. Grabowski (Democratic) 47.7%; ▌Stephen Minot (American Independent) 3.4%

== Delaware ==
District	Incumbent			This race	
District	Member	Party	First elected	Results	Candidates
Delaware at-large	Harris McDowell	Democratic	1958	Incumbent lost re-election. Republican gain.	▌ ✓ William Roth (Republican) 55.8%; ▌Harris McDowell (Democratic) 44.2%

== Florida ==
Florida redistricted to adjust for demographic changes; in addition to minor boundary changes a district was removed from northern Florida, and Broward County was broken out into its own district.

District	Incumbent			This race	
District	Member	Party	First elected	Results	Candidates
Florida 1	Bob Sikes	Democratic	1940; 1944 (resigned); 1974	Incumbent re-elected.	▌ ✓ Bob Sikes (Democratic) Unopposed
Florida 2	Don Fuqua; Redistricted from the 9th district	Democratic	1962	Incumbent re-elected.	▌ ✓ Don Fuqua (Democratic) 76.3%; ▌Harold Hill (Republican) 23.7%
Florida 2	D. R. Matthews; Redistricted from the 8th district	Democratic	1952	Incumbent lost renomination. Democratic loss.	▌ ✓ Don Fuqua (Democratic) 76.3%; ▌Harold Hill (Republican) 23.7%
Florida 3	Charles E. Bennett; Redistricted from the 2nd district	Democratic	1948	Incumbent re-elected.	▌ ✓ Charles E. Bennett (Democratic) Unopposed
Florida 4	Syd Herlong; Redistricted from the 5th district	Democratic	1948	Incumbent re-elected.	▌ ✓ Syd Herlong (Democratic) Unopposed
Florida 5	Edward Gurney; Redistricted from the 11th district	Republican	1962	Incumbent re-elected.	▌ ✓ Edward Gurney (Republican) Unopposed
Florida 6	Sam Gibbons; Redistricted from the 10th district	Democratic	1962	Incumbent re-elected.	▌ ✓ Sam Gibbons (Democratic) Unopposed
Florida 7	James A. Haley	Democratic	1952	Incumbent re-elected.	▌ ✓ James A. Haley (Democratic) 63.2%; ▌Joe Z. Lovingood (Republican) 36.8%
Florida 8	William C. Cramer; Redistricted from the 12th district	Republican	1954	Incumbent re-elected.	▌ ✓ William C. Cramer (Republican) 70.8%; ▌Roy L. Reynolds (Democratic) 29.2%
Florida 9	Paul Rogers; Redistricted from the 6th district	Democratic	1954	Incumbent re-elected.	▌ ✓ Paul Rogers (Democratic) Unopposed
Florida 10	None (district created)			New seat. Republican gain.	▌ ✓ J. Herbert Burke (Republican) 61.1%; ▌Joe Varon (Democratic) 38.9%
Florida 11	Claude Pepper; Redistricted from the 3rd district	Democratic	1962	Incumbent re-elected.	▌ ✓ Claude Pepper (Democratic) Unopposed
Florida 12	Dante Fascell; Redistricted from the 4th district	Democratic	1954	Incumbent re-elected.	▌ ✓ Dante Fascell (Democratic) 56.9%; ▌Mike Thompson (Republican) 43.1%

== Georgia ==
District	Incumbent			This race	
District	Member	Party	First elected	Results	Candidates
Georgia 1	G. Elliott Hagan	Democratic	1960	Incumbent re-elected.	▌ ✓ G. Elliott Hagan (Democratic) 58.0%; ▌Porter Carswell (Republican) 42.0%
Georgia 2	Maston E. O'Neal Jr.	Democratic	1964	Incumbent re-elected.	▌ ✓ Maston E. O'Neal Jr. (Democratic) Unopposed
Georgia 3	Bo Callaway	Republican	1964	Incumbent retired to run for governor. Democratic gain.	▌ ✓ Jack Brinkley (Democratic) 61.8%; ▌Billy J. Mixon (Republican) 38.2%
Georgia 4	James MacKay	Democratic	1964	Incumbent lost re-election. Republican gain.	▌ ✓ Benjamin B. Blackburn (Republican) 50.2%; ▌James MacKay (Democratic) 49.8%
Georgia 5	Charles L. Weltner	Democratic	1962	Incumbent withdrew and was replaced on the ballot. Republican gain.	▌ ✓ Fletcher Thompson (Republican) 60.1%; ▌Archie L. Lindsey (Democratic) 39.9%
Georgia 6	John Flynt	Democratic	1954	Incumbent re-elected.	▌ ✓ John Flynt (Democratic) 67.9%; ▌G. Paul Jones Jr. (Republican) 32.1%
Georgia 7	John William Davis	Democratic	1960	Incumbent re-elected.	▌ ✓ John William Davis (Democratic) 65.0%; ▌Edward Y. Chapin (Republican) 35.0%
Georgia 8	J. Russell Tuten	Democratic	1962	Incumbent lost renomination. Democratic hold.	▌ ✓ W. S. Stuckey Jr. (Democratic) 77.0%; ▌Mack Mattingly (Republican) 23.0%
Georgia 9	Phillip M. Landrum	Democratic	1952	Incumbent re-elected.	▌ ✓ Phillip M. Landrum (Democratic) Unopposed
Georgia 10	Robert Grier Stephens Jr.	Democratic	1960	Incumbent re-elected.	▌ ✓ Robert Grier Stephens Jr. (Democratic) 65.5%; ▌Leroy H. Simkins (Republican) 34.5%

== Hawaii ==
District	Incumbent			This race	
District	Member	Party	First elected	Results	Candidates
Hawaii at-large	Spark Matsunaga	Democratic	1962	Incumbent re-elected.	Elected on a general ticket: ▌ ✓ Patsy Mink (Democratic) 34.3%; ▌ ✓ Spark Matsunaga (Democratic) 34.1%; ▌John Carroll (Republican) 16.4%; ▌James Kealoha (Republican) 15.2%
Hawaii at-large	Patsy Mink	Democratic	1964	Incumbent re-elected.	Elected on a general ticket: ▌ ✓ Patsy Mink (Democratic) 34.3%; ▌ ✓ Spark Matsunaga (Democratic) 34.1%; ▌John Carroll (Republican) 16.4%; ▌James Kealoha (Republican) 15.2%

== Idaho ==
District	Incumbent			This race	
District	Member	Party	First elected	Results	Candidates
Idaho 1	Compton I. White Jr.	Democratic	1962	Incumbent lost re-election. Republican gain.	▌ ✓ Jim McClure (Republican) 51.8%; ▌Compton I. White Jr. (Democratic) 48.2%
Idaho 2	George V. Hansen	Republican	1964	Incumbent re-elected.	▌ ✓ George V. Hansen (Republican) 70.3%; ▌A. W. Brunt (Democratic) 29.7%

== Illinois ==
District	Incumbent			This race	
District	Member	Party	First elected	Results	Candidates
Illinois 1	William L. Dawson	Democratic	1942	Incumbent re-elected.	▌ ✓ William L. Dawson (Democratic) 72.6%; ▌David R. Reed (Republican) 27.4%
Illinois 2	Barratt O'Hara	Democratic	1948; 1950 (lost); 1952	Incumbent re-elected.	▌ ✓ Barratt O'Hara (Democratic) 59.2%; ▌Philip G. Bixler (Republican) 40.8%
Illinois 3	William T. Murphy	Democratic	1958	Incumbent re-elected.	▌ ✓ William T. Murphy (Democratic) 52.0%; ▌Alfred F. Manion (Republican) 48.0%
Illinois 4	Ed Derwinski	Republican	1958	Incumbent re-elected.	▌ ✓ Ed Derwinski (Republican) 72.0%; ▌Ray J. Rybacki (Democratic) 28.0%
Illinois 5	John C. Kluczynski	Democratic	1950	Incumbent re-elected.	▌ ✓ John C. Kluczynski (Democratic) 56.2%; ▌Walter K. Kiltz (Republican) 43.8%
Illinois 6	Daniel J. Ronan	Democratic	1964	Incumbent re-elected.	▌ ✓ Daniel J. Ronan (Democratic) 57.0%; ▌Samuel A. DeCaro (Republican) 43.0%
Illinois 7	Frank Annunzio	Democratic	1964	Incumbent re-elected.	▌ ✓ Frank Annunzio (Democratic) 80.9%; ▌Joseph D. Day (Republican) 19.1%
Illinois 8	Dan Rostenkowski	Democratic	1958	Incumbent re-elected.	▌ ✓ Dan Rostenkowski (Democratic) 59.9%; ▌John H. Leszynski (Republican) 40.1%
Illinois 9	Sidney R. Yates	Democratic	1948; 1962 (retired); 1964	Incumbent re-elected.	▌ ✓ Sidney R. Yates (Democratic) 59.9%; ▌Richard C. Storey Jr. (Republican) 40.1%
Illinois 10	Harold R. Collier	Republican	1956	Incumbent re-elected.	▌ ✓ Harold R. Collier (Republican) 69.4%; ▌Frank J. Jirka Jr. (Democratic) 30.6%
Illinois 11	Roman Pucinski	Democratic	1958	Incumbent re-elected.	▌ ✓ Roman Pucinski (Democratic) 50.9%; ▌John J. Hoellen Jr. (Republican) 49.1%
Illinois 12	Robert McClory	Republican	1962	Incumbent re-elected.	▌ ✓ Robert McClory (Republican) 69.1%; ▌Herbert L. Stern (Democratic) 30.9%
Illinois 13	Donald Rumsfeld	Republican	1962	Incumbent re-elected.	▌ ✓ Donald Rumsfeld (Republican) 76.0%; ▌James L. McCabe (Democratic) 24.0%
Illinois 14	John N. Erlenborn	Republican	1964	Incumbent re-elected.	▌ ✓ John N. Erlenborn (Republican) 71.7%; ▌Kenneth McCleary (Democratic) 28.3%
Illinois 15	Charlotte Thompson Reid	Republican	1962	Incumbent re-elected.	▌ ✓ Charlotte Thompson Reid (Republican) 72.3%; ▌Selwyn L. Boyer (Democratic) 27.7%
Illinois 16	John B. Anderson	Republican	1960	Incumbent re-elected.	▌ ✓ John B. Anderson (Republican) 73.0%; ▌Robert M. Whiteford (Democratic) 27.0%
Illinois 17	Leslie C. Arends	Republican	1934	Incumbent re-elected.	▌ ✓ Leslie C. Arends (Republican) 67.4%; ▌Bernard J. Hughes (Democratic) 32.6%
Illinois 18	Robert H. Michel	Republican	1956	Incumbent re-elected.	▌ ✓ Robert H. Michel (Republican) 58.4%; ▌Thomas V. Cassidy (Democratic) 41.6%
Illinois 19	Gale Schisler	Democratic	1964	Incumbent lost re-election. Republican gain.	▌ ✓ Tom Railsback (Republican) 52.3%; ▌Gale Schisler (Democratic) 47.7%
Illinois 20	Paul Findley	Republican	1960	Incumbent re-elected.	▌ ✓ Paul Findley (Republican) 62.2%; ▌Richard R. Wolfe (Democratic) 37.8%
Illinois 21	Kenneth J. Gray	Democratic	1954	Incumbent re-elected.	▌ ✓ Kenneth J. Gray (Democratic) 56.2%; ▌G. R. Beckmeyer (Republican) 43.8%
Illinois 22	William L. Springer	Republican	1950	Incumbent re-elected.	▌ ✓ William L. Springer (Republican) 63.3%; ▌Cameron B. Satterthwaite (Democratic) 36.7%
Illinois 23	George E. Shipley	Democratic	1958	Incumbent re-elected.	▌ ✓ George E. Shipley (Democratic) 56.4%; ▌Leslie N. Jones (Republican) 43.6%
Illinois 24	Melvin Price	Democratic	1944	Incumbent re-elected.	▌ ✓ Melvin Price (Democratic) 71.5%; ▌John S. Guthrie (Republican) 28.5%

== Indiana ==
Indiana redistricted for this election, election boundary changes forced two Republican incumbents into the same district while creating a new district that was won by another Republican.

District	Incumbent			This race	
District	Member	Party	First elected	Results	Candidates
Indiana 1	Ray Madden	Democratic	1942	Incumbent re-elected.	▌ ✓ Ray Madden (Democratic) 58.3%; ▌Albert Harrigan (Republican) 41.7%
Indiana 2	Charles A. Halleck	Republican	1935 (special)	Incumbent re-elected.	▌ ✓ Charles A. Halleck (Republican) 57.5%; ▌Ralph G. McFadden (Democratic) 42.5%
Indiana 3	John Brademas	Democratic	1958	Incumbent re-elected.	▌ ✓ John Brademas (Democratic) 55.8%; ▌Robert A. Ehlers (Republican) 44.2%
Indiana 4	E. Ross Adair	Republican	1950	Incumbent re-elected.	▌ ✓ E. Ross Adair (Republican) 63.5%; ▌J. Byron Hayes (Democratic) 36.5%
Indiana 5	J. Edward Roush	Democratic	1958	Incumbent re-elected.	▌ ✓ J. Edward Roush (Democratic) 51.1%; ▌Kenneth Bowman (Republican) 48.9%
Indiana 6	William G. Bray; Redistricted from the 7th district	Republican	1950	Incumbent re-elected.	▌ ✓ William G. Bray (Republican) 65.7%; ▌James M. Nicholson (Democratic) 33.6%; ▌Henry W. Holt (Independent) 0.7%
Indiana 7	None (district created)			New seat. Republican gain.	▌ ✓ John T. Myers (Republican) 54.3%; ▌Elden C. Tipton (Democratic) 45.7%
Indiana 8	Winfield K. Denton	Democratic	1954	Incumbent lost re-election. Republican gain.	▌ ✓ Roger H. Zion (Republican) 51.1%; ▌Winfield K. Denton (Democratic) 48.9%
Indiana 9	Lee Hamilton	Democratic	1964	Incumbent re-elected.	▌ ✓ Lee Hamilton (Democratic) 53.8%; ▌John W. Lewis (Republican) 46.2%
Indiana 10	Richard L. Roudebush; Redistricted from the 6th district	Republican	1960	Incumbent re-elected.	▌ ✓ Richard L. Roudebush (Republican) 63.4%; ▌Robert H. Staton (Democratic) 36.6%
Indiana 10	Ralph Harvey	Republican	1960	Incumbent lost renomination. Republican loss.	▌ ✓ Richard L. Roudebush (Republican) 63.4%; ▌Robert H. Staton (Democratic) 36.6%
Indiana 11	Andrew Jacobs Jr.	Democratic	1964	Incumbent re-elected.	▌ ✓ Andrew Jacobs Jr. (Democratic) 55.7%; ▌Paul R. Oakes (Republican) 44.3%

== Iowa ==
District	Incumbent			This race	
District	Member	Party	First elected	Results	Candidates
Iowa 1	John R. Schmidhauser	Democratic	1964	Incumbent lost re-election. Republican gain.	▌ ✓ Fred Schwengel (Republican) 51.3%; ▌John R. Schmidhauser (Democratic) 47.9%; ▌Merle M. Thayer (American Constitution) 0.8%
Iowa 2	John Culver	Democratic	1964	Incumbent re-elected.	▌ ✓ John Culver (Democratic) 54.0%; ▌Robert M. L. Johnson (Republican) 46.0%
Iowa 3	H. R. Gross	Republican	1948	Incumbent re-elected.	▌ ✓ H. R. Gross (Republican) 62.0%; ▌L. A. Pat Touchae (Democratic) 38.0%
Iowa 4	Bert Bandstra	Democratic	1964	Incumbent lost re-election. Republican gain.	▌ ✓ John Henry Kyl (Republican) 51.7%; ▌Bert Bandstra (Democratic) 48.3%
Iowa 5	Neal Smith	Democratic	1958	Incumbent re-elected.	▌ ✓ Neal Smith (Democratic) 60.4%; ▌Don Mahon (Republican) 39.0%; ▌Robbins Risher (American Constitution) 0.6%
Iowa 6	Stanley L. Greigg	Democratic	1964	Incumbent lost re-election. Republican gain.	▌ ✓ Wiley Mayne (Republican) 57.4%; ▌Stanley L. Greigg (Democratic) 42.3%; ▌Lee E. Smith (American Constitution) 0.3%
Iowa 7	John R. Hansen	Democratic	1964	Incumbent lost re-election. Republican gain.	▌ ✓ William J. Scherle (Republican) 59.0%; ▌John R. Hansen (Democratic) 40.9%; ▌Gordon Risher (American Constitution) 0.1%

== Kansas ==
District	Incumbent			This race	
District	Member	Party	First elected	Results	Candidates
Kansas 1	Bob Dole	Republican	1960	Incumbent re-elected.	▌ ✓ Bob Dole (Republican) 68.6%; ▌Berniece Henkle (Democratic) 31.4%
Kansas 2	Chester L. Mize	Republican	1964	Incumbent re-elected.	▌ ✓ Chester L. Mize (Republican) 62.8%; ▌Harry G. Wiles (Democratic) 37.2%
Kansas 3	Robert Ellsworth	Republican	1960	Incumbent retired to run for U.S. senator. Republican hold.	▌ ✓ Larry Winn (Republican) 52.9%; ▌Marvin E. Rainey (Democratic) 45.0%; ▌Harold H. Shomber (Conservative) 2.1%
Kansas 4	Garner E. Shriver	Republican	1960	Incumbent re-elected.	▌ ✓ Garner E. Shriver (Republican) 68.7%; ▌Paul H. Gerling (Democratic) 31.3%
Kansas 5	Joe Skubitz	Republican	1962	Incumbent re-elected.	▌ ✓ Joe Skubitz (Republican) 60.9%; ▌Delno L. Bass (Democratic) 39.1%

== Kentucky ==
District	Incumbent			This race	
District	Member	Party	First elected	Results	Candidates
Kentucky 1	Frank Stubblefield	Democratic	1958	Incumbent re-elected.	▌ ✓ Frank Stubblefield (Democratic) 70.6%; ▌Richard Nicholson (Republican) 29.4%
Kentucky 2	William Natcher	Democratic	1953 (special)	Incumbent re-elected.	▌ ✓ William Natcher (Democratic) 58.9%; ▌R. Douglas Ford (Republican) 41.1%
Kentucky 3	Charles R. Farnsley	Democratic	1964	Incumbent retired. Republican gain.	▌ ✓ William Cowger (Republican) 59.0%; ▌Norbert Blume (Democratic) 41.0%
Kentucky 4	Frank Chelf	Democratic	1944	Incumbent retired, but replaced John Moloney on the ballot after he died 2 days before the election. Incumbent lost re-election. Republican gain.	▌ ✓ Gene Snyder (Republican) 53.9%; ▌Frank Chelf (Democratic) 45.9%; ▌John J. Moloney (write-in) 0.1%
Kentucky 5	Tim Lee Carter	Republican	1964	Incumbent re-elected.	▌ ✓ Tim Lee Carter (Republican) 75.4%; ▌Eugene C. Harter Jr. (Democratic) 24.6%
Kentucky 6	John C. Watts	Democratic	1951 (special)	Incumbent re-elected.	▌ ✓ John C. Watts (Democratic) 65.0%; ▌William Hendren (Republican) 35.0%
Kentucky 7	Carl D. Perkins	Democratic	1948	Incumbent re-elected.	▌ ✓ Carl D. Perkins (Democratic) 68.9%; ▌C. F. See (Republican) 31.1%

== Louisiana ==
District	Incumbent			This race	
District	Member	Party	First elected	Results	Candidates
Louisiana 1	F. Edward Hébert	Democratic	1940	Incumbent re-elected.	▌ ✓ F. Edward Hébert (Democratic) Unopposed
Louisiana 2	Hale Boggs	Democratic	1940; 1942 (lost); 1946	Incumbent re-elected.	▌ ✓ Hale Boggs (Democratic) 68.6%; ▌Leonard L. Limes (Republican) 31.4%
Louisiana 3	Edwin E. Willis	Democratic	1948	Incumbent re-elected.	▌ ✓ Edwin E. Willis (Democratic) 59.7%; ▌Hall Lyons (Republican) 40.3%
Louisiana 4	Joe Waggonner	Democratic	1961 (special)	Incumbent re-elected.	▌ ✓ Joe Waggonner (Democratic) Unopposed
Louisiana 5	Otto Passman	Democratic	1946	Incumbent re-elected.	▌ ✓ Otto Passman (Democratic) Unopposed
Louisiana 6	James H. Morrison	Democratic	1942	Incumbent lost renomination. Democratic hold.	▌ ✓ John Rarick (Democratic) 76.6%; ▌Crayton G. Hall (Republican) 23.4%
Louisiana 7	Edwin Edwards	Democratic	1965 (special)	Incumbent re-elected.	▌ ✓ Edwin Edwards (Democratic) Unopposed
Louisiana 8	Speedy Long	Democratic	1964	Incumbent re-elected.	▌ ✓ Speedy Long (Democratic) Unopposed

== Maine ==
District	Incumbent			This race	
District	Member	Party	First elected	Results	Candidates
Maine 1	Stanley R. Tupper	Republican	1960	Incumbent retired. Democratic gain.	▌ ✓ Peter Kyros (Democratic) 50.4%; ▌Peter A. Garland (Republican) 45.2%; ▌Thomas L. Maynard (Independent) 4.4%
Maine 2	William Hathaway	Democratic	1964	Incumbent re-elected.	▌ ✓ William Hathaway (Democratic) 56.8%; ▌Howard M. Foley (Republican) 43.2%

== Maryland ==
Maryland redistricted its at-large district into an 8th district around Montgomery County, managing to adjust boundaries so no existing incumbents were displaced.

District	Incumbent			This race	
District	Member	Party	First elected	Results	Candidates
Maryland 1	Rogers Morton	Republican	1962	Incumbent re-elected.	▌ ✓ Rogers Morton (Republican) 71.4%; ▌Harry C. Byrd (Democratic) 28.6%
Maryland 2	Clarence Long	Democratic	1962	Incumbent re-elected.	▌ ✓ Clarence Long (Democratic) 69.3%; ▌Paul T. McHenry Jr. (Republican) 30.7%
Maryland 3	Edward Garmatz	Democratic	1947 (special)	Incumbent re-elected.	▌ ✓ Edward Garmatz (Democratic) Unopposed
Maryland 4	George Hyde Fallon	Democratic	1944	Incumbent re-elected.	▌ ✓ George Hyde Fallon (Democratic) 74.3%; ▌G. Neilson Sigler (Republican) 25.7%
Maryland 5	Hervey Machen	Democratic	1964	Incumbent re-elected.	▌ ✓ Hervey Machen (Democratic) 53.9%; ▌Lawrence Hogan (Republican) 46.1%
Maryland 6	Charles Mathias	Republican	1960	Incumbent re-elected.	▌ ✓ Charles Mathias (Republican) 70.9%; ▌Walter G. Finch (Democratic) 29.1%
Maryland 7	Samuel Friedel	Democratic	1952	Incumbent re-elected.	▌ ✓ Samuel Friedel (Democratic) 76.0%; ▌Stephen L. Rosenstein (Republican) 24.0%
Maryland 8	Carlton R. Sickles; Redistricted from the at-large seat	Democratic	1962	Incumbent retired to run for governor. Republican gain.	▌ ✓ Gilbert Gude (Republican) 54.4%; ▌Royce Hanson (Democratic) 45.6%

== Massachusetts ==
District	Incumbent			This race	
District	Member	Party	First elected	Results	Candidates
Massachusetts 1	Silvio O. Conte	Republican	1958	Incumbent re-elected.	▌ ✓ Silvio O. Conte (Republican) Unopposed
Massachusetts 2	Edward Boland	Democratic	1952	Incumbent re-elected.	▌ ✓ Edward Boland (Democratic) Unopposed
Massachusetts 3	Philip J. Philbin	Democratic	1942	Incumbent re-elected.	▌ ✓ Philip J. Philbin (Democratic) 71.0%; ▌Howard A. Miller Jr. (Republican) 29.0%
Massachusetts 4	Harold Donohue	Democratic	1946	Incumbent re-elected.	▌ ✓ Harold Donohue (Democratic) Unopposed
Massachusetts 5	F. Bradford Morse	Republican	1960	Incumbent re-elected.	▌ ✓ F. Bradford Morse (Republican) 74.8%; ▌Charles N. Tsapatsaris (Democratic) 25.2%
Massachusetts 6	William H. Bates	Republican	1950	Incumbent re-elected.	▌ ✓ William H. Bates (Republican) 65.7%; ▌Daniel L. Parent (Democratic) 34.3%
Massachusetts 7	Torbert Macdonald	Democratic	1954	Incumbent re-elected.	▌ ✓ Torbert Macdonald (Democratic) 74.5%; ▌Gordon F. Hughes (Republican) 25.5%
Massachusetts 8	Tip O'Neill	Democratic	1952	Incumbent re-elected.	▌ ✓ Tip O'Neill (Democratic) Unopposed
Massachusetts 9	John W. McCormack	Democratic	1928	Incumbent re-elected.	▌ ✓ John W. McCormack (Democratic) Unopposed
Massachusetts 10	Joseph W. Martin Jr.	Republican	1924	Incumbent lost renomination. Republican hold.	▌ ✓ Margaret Heckler (Republican) 51.1%; ▌Patrick H. Harrington Jr. (Democratic) 48.9%
Massachusetts 11	James A. Burke	Democratic	1958	Incumbent re-elected.	▌ ✓ James A. Burke (Democratic) 74.8%; ▌James L. Hofford (Republican) 25.2%
Massachusetts 12	Hastings Keith	Republican	1958	Incumbent re-elected.	▌ ✓ Hastings Keith (Republican) 55.0%; ▌Edward F. Harrington (Democratic) 45.0%

== Michigan ==
District	Incumbent			This race	
District	Member	Party	First elected	Results	Candidates
Michigan 1	John Conyers	Democratic	1964	Incumbent re-elected.	▌ ✓ John Conyers (Democratic) 84.2%; ▌Rhecha R. Ross (Republican) 15.8%
Michigan 2	Weston E. Vivian	Democratic	1964	Incumbent lost re-election. Republican gain.	▌ ✓ Marvin L. Esch (Republican) 51.0%; ▌Weston E. Vivian (Democratic) 49.0%
Michigan 3	Paul H. Todd Jr.	Democratic	1964	Incumbent lost re-election. Republican gain.	▌ ✓ Garry E. Brown (Republican) 52.2%; ▌Paul H. Todd Jr. (Democratic) 47.8%
Michigan 4	J. Edward Hutchinson	Republican	1962	Incumbent re-elected.	▌ ✓ J. Edward Hutchinson (Republican) 67.8%; ▌John V. Martin (Democratic) 32.2%
Michigan 5	Gerald Ford	Republican	1948	Incumbent re-elected.	▌ ✓ Gerald Ford (Republican) 68.4%; ▌James Mathew Catchick (Democratic) 31.6%
Michigan 6	Charles E. Chamberlain	Republican	1956	Incumbent re-elected.	▌ ✓ Charles E. Chamberlain (Republican) 67.3%; ▌Lee H. Wenke (Democratic) 32.7%
Michigan 7	John C. Mackie	Democratic	1964	Incumbent lost re-election. Republican gain.	▌ ✓ Donald Riegle (Republican) 54.1%; ▌John C. Mackie (Democratic) 45.9%
Michigan 8	R. James Harvey	Republican	1960	Incumbent re-elected.	▌ ✓ R. James Harvey (Republican) 69.9%; ▌Wager F. Clunis (Democratic) 30.1%
Michigan 9	Robert P. Griffin	Republican	1956	Resigned to become U.S. senator. Republican hold.	▌ ✓ Guy Vander Jagt (Republican) 66.7%; ▌Henry J. Dongvillo (Democratic) 33.3%
Michigan 10	Al Cederberg	Republican	1952	Incumbent re-elected.	▌ ✓ Al Cederberg (Republican) 67.4%; ▌Hubert C. Evans (Democratic) 32.6%
Michigan 11	Raymond F. Clevenger	Democratic	1964	Incumbent lost re-election. Republican gain.	▌ ✓ Philip Ruppe (Republican) 51.8%; ▌Raymond F. Clevenger (Democratic) 48.2%
Michigan 12	James G. O'Hara	Democratic	1958	Incumbent re-elected.	▌ ✓ James G. O'Hara (Democratic) 65.1%; ▌Patrick J. Driscoll (Republican) 34.9%
Michigan 13	Charles Diggs	Democratic	1954	Incumbent re-elected.	▌ ✓ Charles Diggs (Democratic) 83.0%; ▌Frank Daniels (Republican) 17.0%
Michigan 14	Lucien Nedzi	Democratic	1961 (special)	Incumbent re-elected.	▌ ✓ Lucien Nedzi (Democratic) 59.7%; ▌William J. Kennedy (Republican) 40.3%
Michigan 15	William D. Ford	Democratic	1964	Incumbent re-elected.	▌ ✓ William D. Ford (Democratic) 67.8%; ▌Arpo Yemen (Republican) 32.2%
Michigan 16	John Dingell	Democratic	1955 (special)	Incumbent re-elected.	▌ ✓ John Dingell (Democratic) 62.7%; ▌John T. Dempsey (Republican) 37.3%
Michigan 17	Martha Griffiths	Democratic	1954	Incumbent re-elected.	▌ ✓ Martha Griffiths (Democratic) 69.2%; ▌William P. Harrington (Republican) 30.8%
Michigan 18	William Broomfield	Republican	1956	Incumbent re-elected.	▌ ✓ William Broomfield (Republican) 67.8%; ▌William H. Merrill (Democratic) 32.2%
Michigan 19	Billie S. Farnum	Democratic	1964	Incumbent lost re-election. Republican gain.	▌ ✓ Jack H. McDonald (Republican) 57.0%; ▌Billie S. Farnum (Democratic) 43.0%

== Minnesota ==
District	Incumbent			This race	
District	Member	Party	First elected	Results	Candidates
Minnesota 1	Al Quie	Republican	1958	Incumbent re-elected.	▌ ✓ Al Quie (Republican) 65.9%; ▌George Daley (DFL) 34.1%
Minnesota 2	Ancher Nelsen	Republican	1958	Incumbent re-elected.	▌ ✓ Ancher Nelsen (Republican) 66.2%; ▌Charles M. Christensen (DFL) 33.8%
Minnesota 3	Clark MacGregor	Republican	1960	Incumbent re-elected.	▌ ✓ Clark MacGregor (Republican) 65.4%; ▌Elva D. Walker (DFL) 34.6%
Minnesota 4	Joseph Karth	DFL	1958	Incumbent re-elected.	▌ ✓ Joseph Karth (DFL) 53.4%; ▌Stephen Maxwell (Republican) 46.6%
Minnesota 5	Donald M. Fraser	DFL	1962	Incumbent re-elected.	▌ ✓ Donald M. Fraser (DFL) 59.7%; ▌William L. Hathaway (Republican) 40.3%
Minnesota 6	Alec G. Olson	DFL	1962	Incumbent lost re-election. Republican gain.	▌ ✓ John M. Zwach (Republican) 51.4%; ▌Alec G. Olson (DFL) 48.6%
Minnesota 7	Odin Langen	Republican	1958	Incumbent re-elected.	▌ ✓ Odin Langen (Republican) 63.2%; ▌Keith C. Davison (DFL) 36.8%
Minnesota 8	John Blatnik	DFL	1946	Incumbent re-elected.	▌ ✓ John Blatnik (DFL) Unopposed

== Mississippi ==
District	Incumbent			This race	
District	Member	Party	First elected	Results	Candidates
Mississippi 1	Thomas Abernethy	Democratic	1942	Incumbent re-elected.	▌ ✓ Thomas Abernethy (Democratic) 68.8%; ▌William Alexander (Independent) 21.3%; ▌Dock Drummond (Independent) 9.9%
Mississippi 2	Jamie Whitten	Democratic	1941 (special)	Incumbent re-elected.	▌ ✓ Jamie Whitten (Democratic) 83.5%; ▌Seelig Wise (Republican) 16.5%
Mississippi 3	John Bell Williams	Democratic	1946	Incumbent re-elected.	▌ ✓ John Bell Williams (Democratic) 82.4%; ▌Emma Sanders (Independent) 17.6%
Mississippi 4	Prentiss Walker	Republican	1964	Incumbent retired to run for U.S. Senator. Democratic gain.	▌ ✓ Sonny Montgomery (Democratic) 65.3%; ▌Lewis McAllister (Republican) 32.6%; ▌Sterling P. Davis (Independent) 2.2%
Mississippi 5	William M. Colmer	Democratic	1932	Incumbent re-elected.	▌ ✓ William M. Colmer (Democratic) 70.0%; ▌James M. Moye (Republican) 30.0%

== Missouri ==
District	Incumbent			This race	
District	Member	Party	First elected	Results	Candidates
Missouri 1	Frank M. Karsten	Democratic	1946	Incumbent re-elected.	▌ ✓ Frank M. Karsten (Democratic) 63.9%; ▌Robert L. Sharp (Republican) 36.1%
Missouri 2	Thomas B. Curtis	Republican	1950	Incumbent re-elected.	▌ ✓ Thomas B. Curtis (Republican) 66.2%; ▌William B. Milius (Democratic) 33.8%
Missouri 3	Leonor Sullivan	Democratic	1952	Incumbent re-elected.	▌ ✓ Leonor Sullivan (Democratic) 71.1%; ▌Homer McCracken (Republican) 28.9%
Missouri 4	William J. Randall	Democratic	1959 (special)	Incumbent re-elected.	▌ ✓ William J. Randall (Democratic) 60.9%; ▌Forest Nave Jr. (Republican) 39.1%
Missouri 5	Richard W. Bolling	Democratic	1948	Incumbent re-elected.	▌ ✓ Richard W. Bolling (Democratic) 61.2%; ▌Willis E. Salyers (Republican) 38.8%
Missouri 6	William R. Hull Jr.	Democratic	1954	Incumbent re-elected.	▌ ✓ William R. Hull Jr. (Democratic) 58.0%; ▌John L. Leims (Republican) 42.0%
Missouri 7	Durward G. Hall	Republican	1960	Incumbent re-elected.	▌ ✓ Durward G. Hall (Republican) 62.3%; ▌Arch M. Skelton (Democratic) 37.7%
Missouri 8	Richard H. Ichord Jr.	Democratic	1960	Incumbent re-elected.	▌ ✓ Richard H. Ichord Jr. (Democratic) 58.1%; ▌Ben A. Rogers (Republican) 41.9%
Missouri 9	William L. Hungate	Democratic	1964	Incumbent re-elected.	▌ ✓ William L. Hungate (Democratic) 55.3%; ▌Anthony C. Schroeder (Republican) 44.7%
Missouri 10	Paul C. Jones	Democratic	1948	Incumbent re-elected.	▌ ✓ Paul C. Jones (Democratic) 61.0%; ▌William Bruckerhoff (Republican) 39.0%

== Montana ==
District	Incumbent			This race	
District	Member	Party	First elected	Results	Candidates
Montana 1	Arnold Olsen	Democratic	1960	Incumbent re-elected.	▌ ✓ Arnold Olsen (Democratic) 50.8%; ▌Dick Smiley (Republican) 49.2%
Montana 2	James F. Battin	Republican	1960	Incumbent re-elected.	▌ ✓ James F. Battin (Republican) 60.2%; ▌John Melcher (Democratic) 39.8%

== Nebraska ==
District	Incumbent			This race	
District	Member	Party	First elected	Results	Candidates
Nebraska 1	Clair A. Callan	Democratic	1964	Incumbent lost re-election. Republican gain.	▌ ✓ Robert V. Denney (Republican) 51.2%; ▌Clair A. Callan (Democratic) 48.8%
Nebraska 2	Glenn Cunningham	Republican	1956	Incumbent re-elected.	▌ ✓ Glenn Cunningham (Republican) 64.2%; ▌Richard Fellman (Democratic) 35.8%
Nebraska 3	David Martin	Republican	1960	Incumbent re-elected.	▌ ✓ David Martin (Republican) 73.0%; ▌John Homan (Democratic) 27.0%

== Nevada ==
District	Incumbent			This race	
District	Member	Party	First elected	Results	Candidates
Nevada at-large	Walter S. Baring Jr.	Democratic	1948; 1952 (lost); 1956	Incumbent re-elected.	▌ ✓ Walter S. Baring Jr. (Democratic) 67.6%; ▌Ralph L. Kraemer (Republican) 32.4%

== New Hampshire ==
District	Incumbent			This race	
District	Member	Party	First elected	Results	Candidates
New Hampshire 1	J. Oliva Huot	Democratic	1964	Incumbent lost re-election. Republican gain.	▌ ✓ Louis C. Wyman (Republican) 56.2%; ▌J. Oliva Huot (Democratic) 43.8%
New Hampshire 2	James Colgate Cleveland	Republican	1962	Incumbent re-elected.	▌ ✓ James Colgate Cleveland (Republican) 66.8%; ▌William H. Barry Jr. (Democratic) 33.2%

== New Jersey ==
District	Incumbent			This race	
District	Member	Party	First elected	Results	Candidates
New Jersey 1	None (district created)			New seat. Republican gain.	▌ ✓ John E. Hunt (Republican) 51.3%; ▌Michael J. Piarulli (Democratic) 46.2%; ▌Elliott G. Heard Jr. (Independent) 1.4%; ▌Joseph V. Hayden (Conservative) 0.7%; ▌Dominic W. Doganiero (Socialist Labor) 0.1%; ▌Frederick L. Compton (Peace Equal Rights) 0.1%
New Jersey 2	Thomas C. McGrath Jr.	Democratic	1964	Incumbent lost re-election. Republican gain.	▌ ✓ Charles W. Sandman Jr. (Republican) 51.5%; ▌Thomas C. McGrath Jr. (Democratic) 46.9%; ▌Albert Ronis (Socialist Labor) 0.9%; ▌Lindwood W. Erickson Jr. (Conservative) 0.7%
New Jersey 3	James J. Howard	Democratic	1964	Incumbent re-elected.	▌ ✓ James J. Howard (Democratic) 52.7%; ▌James M. Coleman (Republican) 46.6%; ▌Martin A. Watkins (Peace Equal Rights) 0.7%
New Jersey 4	Frank Thompson	Democratic	1954	Incumbent re-elected.	▌ ✓ Frank Thompson (Democratic) 56.2%; ▌Ralph Clark Chandler (Republican) 43.5%; ▌Joseph J. Frank (Socialist Labor) 0.3%
New Jersey 5	Peter Frelinghuysen Jr.	Republican	1952	Incumbent re-elected.	▌ ✓ Peter Frelinghuysen Jr. (Republican) 70.8%; ▌Carter Jefferson (Democratic) 27.1%; ▌Robert G. Wright (Conservative) 2.2%
New Jersey 6	William T. Cahill; Redistricted from the 1st district	Republican	1958	Incumbent re-elected.	▌ ✓ William T. Cahill (Republican) 66.9%; ▌Walter Dubrow (Democratic) 30.7%; ▌Malcolm C. McWeeney (Conservative) 1.8%; ▌Nathan Robinson (Peace Equal Rights) 0.5%; ▌Bernardo S. Doganiero (Socialist Labor) 0.2%
New Jersey 7	William B. Widnall	Republican	1950	Incumbent re-elected.	▌ ✓ William B. Widnall (Republican) 66.4%; ▌Robert E. Hamer (Democratic) 33.6%
New Jersey 8	Charles S. Joelson	Democratic	1960	Incumbent re-elected.	▌ ✓ Charles S. Joelson (Democratic) 59.6%; ▌Richard M. DeMarco (Republican) 38.2%; ▌Harry Santhouse (Socialist Labor) 2.2%
New Jersey 9	Henry Helstoski	Democratic	1964	Incumbent re-elected.	▌ ✓ Henry Helstoski (Democratic) 50.9%; ▌Frank C. Osmers Jr. (Republican) 49.1%
New Jersey 10	Peter W. Rodino	Democratic	1948	Incumbent re-elected.	▌ ✓ Peter W. Rodino (Democratic) 64.3%; ▌Earl Harris (Republican) 32.7%; ▌Virginia Elliott (Conservative) 2.4%; ▌Harry Press (Socialist Labor) 0.6%
New Jersey 11	Joseph Minish	Democratic	1962	Incumbent re-elected.	▌ ✓ Joseph Minish (Democratic) 58.3%; ▌Leonard J. Felzenberg (Republican) 40.8%; ▌Joseph Carroll (Socialist Labor) 0.9%
New Jersey 12	Florence P. Dwyer; Redistricted from the 6th district	Republican	1956	Incumbent re-elected.	▌ ✓ Florence P. Dwyer (Republican) 73.9%; ▌Robert F. Allen (Democratic) 23.9%; ▌Howard Shershinger (Conservative) 2.1%
New Jersey 12	Paul J. Krebs	Democratic	1964	Incumbent retired. Democratic loss.	▌ ✓ Florence P. Dwyer (Republican) 73.9%; ▌Robert F. Allen (Democratic) 23.9%; ▌Howard Shershinger (Conservative) 2.1%
New Jersey 13	Neil Gallagher	Democratic	1958	Incumbent re-elected.	▌ ✓ Neil Gallagher (Democratic) 71.8%; ▌Ruth Swayze (Republican) 28.2%
New Jersey 14	Dominick V. Daniels	Democratic	1958	Incumbent re-elected.	▌ ✓ Dominick V. Daniels (Democratic) 68.0%; ▌Thomas R. McSherry (Republican) 28.5%; ▌Benjamin J. Messina (Conservative) 3.5%
New Jersey 15	Edward J. Patten	Democratic	1962	Incumbent re-elected.	▌ ✓ Edward J. Patten (Democratic) 57.0%; ▌C. John Stroumtsos (Republican) 41.5%; ▌Albert Wasilewski (Conservative) 1.6%

== New Mexico ==
District	Incumbent			This race	
District	Member	Party	First elected	Results	Candidates
New Mexico at-large	Thomas G. Morris	Democratic	1958	Incumbent re-elected.	▌ ✓ Thomas G. Morris (Democratic) 27.9%; ▌ ✓ E. S. Johnny Walker (Democratic) 25.3%; ▌Robert C. Davidson (Republican) 24.8%; ▌Schuble C. Cook (Republican) 22.0%
New Mexico at-large	E. S. Johnny Walker	Democratic	1964	Incumbent re-elected.	▌ ✓ Thomas G. Morris (Democratic) 27.9%; ▌ ✓ E. S. Johnny Walker (Democratic) 25.3%; ▌Robert C. Davidson (Republican) 24.8%; ▌Schuble C. Cook (Republican) 22.0%

== New York ==
District	Incumbent			This race	
District	Member	Party	First elected	Results	Candidates
New York 1	Otis G. Pike	Democratic	1960	Incumbent re-elected.	▌ ✓ Otis G. Pike (Democratic) 58.9%; ▌James M. Catterson Jr. (Republican) 33.7%; ▌Domenico Crachi Jr. (Conservative) 7.4%
New York 2	James R. Grover Jr.	Republican	1962	Incumbent re-elected.	▌ ✓ James R. Grover Jr. (Republican) 54.7%; ▌Frank M. Corso (Democratic) 34.1%; ▌Edward Campbell (Conservative) 10.2%; ▌John Brush (Peace) 1.0%
New York 3	Lester L. Wolff	Democratic	1964	Incumbent re-elected.	▌ ✓ Lester L. Wolff (Democratic) 50.3%; ▌Steven Derounian (Republican) 49.7%
New York 4	John W. Wydler	Republican	1962	Incumbent re-elected.	▌ ✓ John W. Wydler (Republican) 59.7%; ▌Martin Steadman (Democratic) 32.0%; ▌Donald H. Serrell (Conservative) 6.9%; ▌Bernard Kagel (Peace) 1.4%
New York 5	Herbert Tenzer	Democratic	1964	Incumbent re-elected.	▌ ✓ Herbert Tenzer (Democratic) 49.9%; ▌Thomas Brennan (Republican) 48.6%; ▌Carleton M. Fisher (Peace) 1.5%
New York 6	Seymour Halpern	Republican	1958	Incumbent re-elected.	▌ ✓ Seymour Halpern (Republican) 59.0%; ▌Gilbert T. Redleaf (Democratic) 29.4%; ▌Ronald E. Weiss (Conservative) 11.5%
New York 7	Joseph P. Addabbo	Democratic	1960	Incumbent re-elected.	▌ ✓ Joseph P. Addabbo (Democratic) 64.9%; ▌Louis R. Mercogliano (Republican) 24.0%; ▌Raymond G. Carpenter (Conservative) 11.1%
New York 8	Benjamin Rosenthal	Democratic	1962	Incumbent re-elected.	▌ ✓ Benjamin Rosenthal (Democratic) 69.6%; ▌Thomas C. Gowlan (Republican) 22.1%; ▌Cyrus Julien (Conservative) 8.3%
New York 9	James J. Delaney	Democratic	1944; 1946 (lost); 1948	Incumbent re-elected.	▌ ✓ James J. Delaney (Democratic) 53.5%; ▌John F. Haggerty (Republican) 40.0%; ▌David Green (Liberal) 6.5%
New York 10	Emanuel Celler	Democratic	1922	Incumbent re-elected.	▌ ✓ Emanuel Celler (Democratic) 82.1%; ▌Erwin A. Rosenberg (Republican) 17.9%
New York 11	Eugene Keogh	Democratic	1936	Incumbent retired. Democratic hold.	▌ ✓ Frank J. Brasco (Democratic) 70.6%; ▌Benjamin W. Feldman (Republican) 21.9%; ▌Edward L. Johnson (Liberal) 7.5%
New York 12	Edna F. Kelly	Democratic	1949 (special)	Incumbent re-elected.	▌ ✓ Edna F. Kelly (Democratic) 72.7%; ▌Alfred G. Walton (Republican) 24.4%; ▌Herbert Aptheker (Peace and Freedom) 3.0%
New York 13	Abraham J. Multer	Democratic	1947 (special)	Incumbent re-elected.	▌ ✓ Abraham J. Multer (Democratic) 61.9%; ▌Mary Gravina (Republican) 18.6%; ▌Hershell Chanin (Liberal) 13.3%; ▌Michael J. Spadaro (Conservative) 6.1%
New York 14	John J. Rooney	Democratic	1944	Incumbent re-elected.	▌ ✓ John J. Rooney (Democratic) 77.6%; ▌Leon F. Nadrowski (Republican) 22.4%
New York 15	Hugh Carey	Democratic	1960	Incumbent re-elected.	▌ ✓ Hugh Carey (Democratic) 56.8%; ▌Herbert F. Ryan (Republican) 43.2%
New York 16	John M. Murphy	Democratic	1962	Incumbent re-elected.	▌ ✓ John M. Murphy (Democratic) 57.4%; ▌Frank J. Biondolillo (Republican) 42.6%
New York 17	Theodore R. Kupferman	Republican	1966 (special)	Incumbent re-elected.	▌ ✓ Theodore R. Kupferman (Republican) 47.7%; ▌Jerome L. Wilson (Democratic) 46.2%; ▌Richard J. Callahan (Conservative) 6.1%
New York 18	Adam Clayton Powell Jr.	Democratic	1944	Incumbent re-elected.	▌ ✓ Adam Clayton Powell Jr. (Democratic) 74.0%; ▌Lassen R. Walsh (Republican) 17.5%; ▌Richard Priedeaux (Liberal) 6.5%; ▌Ryland E. D. Chase (Conservative) 2.0%
New York 19	Leonard Farbstein	Democratic	1956	Incumbent re-elected.	▌ ✓ Leonard Farbstein (Democratic) 57.8%; ▌Henry E. Del Rosso (Republican) 26.2%; ▌Elaine M. Morrison (Liberal) 12.2%; ▌James Weinstein (Socialist) 3.8%
New York 20	William Fitts Ryan	Democratic	1960	Incumbent re-elected.	▌ ✓ William Fitts Ryan (Democratic) 74.8%; ▌Norman C. Harlowe (Republican) 20.7%; ▌Carolyn S. Weller (Conservative) 4.5%
New York 21	James H. Scheuer	Democratic	1964	Incumbent re-elected.	▌ ✓ James H. Scheuer (Democratic) 83.6%; ▌Burton Siegel (Republican) 16.4%
New York 22	Jacob H. Gilbert	Democratic	1960	Incumbent re-elected.	▌ ✓ Jacob H. Gilbert (Democratic) 74.2%; ▌Pedro Luis Rodriguez (Republican) 19.3%; ▌Carlos Rosario (Liberal) 6.5%
New York 23	Jonathan B. Bingham	Democratic	1964	Incumbent re-elected.	▌ ✓ Jonathan B. Bingham (Democratic) 73.4%; ▌Harold Grosberg (Republican) 18.9%; ▌Walter A. Quinn Jr. (Conservative) 7.8%
New York 24	Paul A. Fino	Republican	1952	Incumbent re-elected.	▌ ✓ Paul A. Fino (Republican) 63.9%; ▌Aileen B. Ryan (Democratic) 33.4%; ▌John P. Hagan (Liberal) 2.7%
New York 25	Richard Ottinger	Democratic	1964	Incumbent re-elected.	▌ ✓ Richard Ottinger (Democratic) 54.6%; ▌Frederick J. Martin Jr. (Republican) 45.4%
New York 26	Ogden R. Reid	Republican	1962	Incumbent re-elected.	▌ ✓ Ogden R. Reid (Republican) 69.3%; ▌Joseph L. Hutner (Democratic) 25.4%; ▌Albert M. Gants (Conservative) 5.3%
New York 27	John G. Dow	Democratic	1964	Incumbent re-elected.	▌ ✓ John G. Dow (Democratic) 47.2%; ▌Louis V. Mills (Republican) 44.5%; ▌Frederick P. Roland (Conservative) 8.3%
New York 28	Joseph Y. Resnick	Democratic	1964	Incumbent re-elected.	▌ ✓ Joseph Y. Resnick (Democratic) 50.3%; ▌Hamilton Fish IV (Republican) 46.3%; ▌Jean Hervey (Conservative) 2.1%; ▌Eric Lindbloom (Peace) 1.3%
New York 29	Leo W. O'Brien	Democratic	1952	Incumbent retired. Republican gain.	▌ ✓ Daniel E. Button (Republican) 53.3%; ▌Richard J. Connors (Democratic) 45.1%; ▌John Muller (Conservative) 1.6%
New York 30	Carleton J. King	Republican	1960	Incumbent re-elected.	▌ ✓ Carleton J. King (Republican) 65.0%; ▌John S. Hall (Democratic) 35.0%
New York 31	Robert C. McEwen	Republican	1964	Incumbent re-elected.	▌ ✓ Robert C. McEwen (Republican) 67.6%; ▌Raymond E. Bishop (Democratic) 32.4%
New York 32	Alexander Pirnie	Republican	1958	Incumbent re-elected.	▌ ✓ Alexander Pirnie (Republican) 72.3%; ▌Robert Castle (Democratic) 27.7%
New York 33	Howard W. Robison	Republican	1958	Incumbent re-elected.	▌ ✓ Howard W. Robison (Republican) 65.7%; ▌Blair G. Ewing (Democratic) 34.0%; ▌Joe Griffith (write-in) 0.3%
New York 34	James M. Hanley	Democratic	1964	Incumbent re-elected.	▌ ✓ James M. Hanley (Democratic) 55.1%; ▌Stewart F. Hancock Jr. (Republican) 38.3%; ▌Benjamin K. Souler (Conservative) 3.6%; ▌Norman Balabanian (Liberal) 3.0%
New York 35	Samuel S. Stratton	Democratic	1958	Incumbent re-elected.	▌ ✓ Samuel S. Stratton (Democratic) 65.8%; ▌Frederick D. Dugan (Republican) 34.2%
New York 36	Frank Horton	Republican	1962	Incumbent re-elected.	▌ ✓ Frank Horton (Republican) 67.3%; ▌Milo Thomas (Democratic) 22.6%; ▌Robert H. Detig (Conservative) 6.4%; ▌Donald P. Feder (Liberal) 3.7%
New York 37	Barber Conable	Republican	1964	Incumbent re-elected.	▌ ✓ Barber Conable (Republican) 67.7%; ▌Kenneth Hed (Democratic) 30.0%; ▌Jerome Balter (Liberal) 2.4%
New York 38	Charles Goodell	Republican	1959 (special)	Incumbent re-elected.	▌ ✓ Charles Goodell (Republican) 67.2%; ▌Edison LeRoy Jr. (Democratic) 29.3%; ▌Charles F. Schwartz (Liberal) 2.1%; ▌Lloyd R. Murphy (Conservative) 1.4%
New York 39	Richard D. McCarthy	Democratic	1964	Incumbent re-elected.	▌ ✓ Richard D. McCarthy (Democratic) 52.3%; ▌John R. Pillion (Republican) 47.7%
New York 40	Henry P. Smith III	Republican	1964	Incumbent re-elected.	▌ ✓ Henry P. Smith III (Republican) 61.2%; ▌William Levitt (Democratic) 38.8%
New York 41	Thaddeus J. Dulski	Democratic	1958	Incumbent re-elected.	▌ ✓ Thaddeus J. Dulski (Democratic) 76.4%; ▌Francis X. Schwab Jr. (Republican) 23.6%

== North Carolina ==
District	Incumbent			This race	
District	Member	Party	First elected	Results	Candidates
North Carolina 1	Walter B. Jones Sr.	Democratic	1966 (special)	Incumbent re-elected.	▌ ✓ Walter B. Jones Sr. (Democratic) 61.3%; ▌John Porter East (Republican) 38.7%
North Carolina 2	Lawrence H. Fountain	Democratic	1952	Incumbent re-elected.	▌ ✓ Lawrence H. Fountain (Democratic) 64.9%; ▌Reece B. Gardner (Republican) 35.1%
North Carolina 3	David N. Henderson	Democratic	1960	Incumbent re-elected.	▌ ✓ David N. Henderson (Democratic) Unopposed
North Carolina 4	Harold D. Cooley	Democratic	1934	Incumbent lost re-election. Republican gain.	▌ ✓ Jim Gardner (Republican) 56.5%; ▌Harold D. Cooley (Democratic) 43.5%
North Carolina 5	Ralph James Scott	Democratic	1956	Incumbent retired. Democratic hold.	▌ ✓ Nick Galifianakis (Democratic) 53.1%; ▌G. Fred Steele Jr. (Republican) 46.9%
North Carolina 6	Horace R. Kornegay	Democratic	1960	Incumbent re-elected.	▌ ✓ Horace R. Kornegay (Democratic) 51.6%; ▌Richard B. Barnwell (Republican) 48.4%
North Carolina 7	Alton Lennon	Democratic	1956	Incumbent re-elected.	▌ ✓ Alton Lennon (Democratic) Unopposed
North Carolina 8	Charles R. Jonas	Republican	1952	Incumbent re-elected.	▌ ✓ Charles R. Jonas (Republican) 71.5%; ▌John G. Plumides (Democratic) 28.5%
North Carolina 9	Jim Broyhill	Republican	1962	Incumbent re-elected.	▌ ✓ Jim Broyhill (Republican) 63.3%; ▌Robert Bingham (Democratic) 36.7%
North Carolina 10	Basil Whitener	Democratic	1956	Incumbent re-elected.	▌ ✓ Basil Whitener (Democratic) 56.1%; ▌W. Hall Young (Republican) 43.9%
North Carolina 11	Roy A. Taylor	Democratic	1960	Incumbent re-elected.	▌ ✓ Roy A. Taylor (Democratic) 52.8%; ▌W. Scott Harvey (Republican) 47.2%

== North Dakota ==
District	Incumbent			This race	
District	Member	Party	First elected	Results	Candidates
North Dakota 1	Mark Andrews	Republican	1963 (special)	Incumbent re-elected.	▌ ✓ Mark Andrews (Republican) 66.2%; ▌Buckshot Hoffner (Democratic-NPL) 33.8%
North Dakota 2	Rolland W. Redlin	Democratic-NPL	1964	Incumbent lost re-election. Republican gain.	▌ ✓ Thomas S. Kleppe (Republican) 51.9%; ▌Rolland W. Redlin (Democratic-NPL) 48.1%

== Ohio ==
Ohio redistricted its at-large seat into a 24th district, splitting out the counties to the southwest of Dayton from the city itself, as well as moving a district in southeastern Ohio into the Columbus area.

District	Incumbent			This race	
District	Member	Party	First elected	Results	Candidates
Ohio 1	John J. Gilligan	Democratic	1964	Incumbent lost re-election. Republican gain.	▌ ✓ Robert Taft Jr. (Republican) 52.9%; ▌John J. Gilligan (Democratic) 47.1%
Ohio 2	Donald D. Clancy	Republican	1960	Incumbent re-elected.	▌ ✓ Donald D. Clancy (Republican) 70.7%; ▌Thomas E. Anderson (Democratic) 29.3%
Ohio 3	Rodney M. Love	Democratic	1964	Incumbent lost re-election. Republican gain.	▌ ✓ Charles W. Whalen Jr. (Republican) 53.8%; ▌Rodney M. Love (Democratic) 46.2%
Ohio 4	William M. McCulloch	Republican	1947 (special)	Incumbent re-elected.	▌ ✓ William M. McCulloch (Republican) 63.6%; ▌Robert H. Mihlbaugh (Democratic) 36.4%
Ohio 5	Del Latta	Republican	1958	Incumbent re-elected.	▌ ✓ Del Latta (Republican) 75.3%; ▌John H. Shock (Democratic) 24.7%
Ohio 6	Bill Harsha	Republican	1960	Incumbent re-elected.	▌ ✓ Bill Harsha (Republican) 67.9%; ▌Ottie W. Reno (Democratic) 32.1%
Ohio 7	Bud Brown	Republican	1965	Incumbent re-elected.	▌ ✓ Bud Brown (Republican) Unopposed
Ohio 8	Jackson Edward Betts	Republican	1950	Incumbent re-elected.	▌ ✓ Jackson Edward Betts (Republican) 67.1%; ▌Frank Bennett (Democratic) 32.9%
Ohio 9	Thomas L. Ashley	Democratic	1954	Incumbent re-elected.	▌ ✓ Thomas L. Ashley (Democratic) 60.8%; ▌Jane M. Kuebbeler (Republican) 39.2%
Ohio 10	Walter H. Moeller	Democratic	1964	Incumbent lost re-election. Republican gain.	▌ ✓ Clarence E. Miller (Republican) 52.0%; ▌Walter H. Moeller (Democratic) 48.0%
Ohio 11	J. William Stanton	Republican	1964	Incumbent re-elected.	▌ ✓ J. William Stanton (Republican) 69.3%; ▌James F. Henderson (Democratic) 30.7%
Ohio 12	Samuel L. Devine	Republican	1958	Incumbent re-elected.	▌ ✓ Samuel L. Devine (Republican) 64.2%; ▌Bob Shamansky (Democratic) 35.8%
Ohio 13	Charles Adams Mosher	Republican	1960	Incumbent re-elected.	▌ ✓ Charles Adams Mosher (Republican) 65.5%; ▌Thomas E. Wolfe (Democratic) 34.5%
Ohio 14	William Hanes Ayres	Republican	1950	Incumbent re-elected.	▌ ✓ William Hanes Ayres (Republican) 59.6%; ▌Charles F. Madden Jr. (Democratic) 40.4%
Ohio 15	None (district created)			New seat. Republican gain.	▌ ✓ Chalmers Wylie (Republican) 59.9%; ▌Robert L. Van Heyde (Republican) 40.1%
Ohio 16	Frank T. Bow	Republican	1950	Incumbent re-elected.	▌ ✓ Frank T. Bow (Republican) 61.1%; ▌Robert D. Freeman (Democratic) 38.9%
Ohio 17	John M. Ashbrook	Republican	1960	Incumbent re-elected.	▌ ✓ John M. Ashbrook (Republican) 55.3%; ▌Robert T. Secrest (Democratic) 44.7%
Ohio 17	Robert T. Secrest; Redistricted from the 15th district	Democratic	1962	Incumbent lost re-election. Democratic loss.	▌ ✓ John M. Ashbrook (Republican) 55.3%; ▌Robert T. Secrest (Democratic) 44.7%
Ohio 18	Wayne Hays	Democratic	1948	Incumbent re-elected.	▌ ✓ Wayne Hays (Democratic) 64.1%; ▌William H. Weir (Republican) 35.9%
Ohio 19	Michael J. Kirwan	Democratic	1936	Incumbent re-elected.	▌ ✓ Michael J. Kirwan (Democratic) 71.9%; ▌Donald J. Lewis (Republican) 28.1%
Ohio 20	Michael A. Feighan	Democratic	1942	Incumbent re-elected.	▌ ✓ Michael A. Feighan (Democratic) 76.1%; ▌Clarence E. McLeod (Republican) 23.9%
Ohio 21	Charles Vanik	Democratic	1954	Incumbent re-elected.	▌ ✓ Charles Vanik (Democratic) 81.7%; ▌Frederick M. Coleman (Republican) 18.3%
Ohio 22	Frances P. Bolton	Republican	1940	Incumbent re-elected.	▌ ✓ Frances P. Bolton (Republican) 55.9%; ▌Anthony O. Calabrese Jr. (Democratic) 44.1%
Ohio 23	William E. Minshall Jr.	Republican	1954	Incumbent re-elected.	▌ ✓ William E. Minshall Jr. (Republican) 73.2%; ▌Sheldon D. Clark (Democratic) 26.8%
Ohio 24	Robert E. Sweeney; Redistricted from the at-large district	Democratic	1964	Incumbent retired. Republican gain.	▌ ✓ Buz Lukens (Republican) 58.5%; ▌James H. Pelley (Democratic) 41.5%

== Oklahoma ==
District	Incumbent			This race	
District	Member	Party	First elected	Results	Candidates
Oklahoma 1	Page Belcher	Republican	1950	Incumbent re-elected.	▌ ✓ Page Belcher (Republican) 69.7%; ▌Ed Cadenhead (Democratic) 30.3%
Oklahoma 2	Ed Edmondson	Democratic	1952	Incumbent re-elected.	▌ ✓ Ed Edmondson (Democratic) 53.6%; ▌Denzil Garrison (Republican) 46.4%
Oklahoma 3	Carl Albert	Democratic	1946	Incumbent re-elected.	▌ ✓ Carl Albert (Democratic) 77.2%; ▌Whit Pate (Republican) 22.8%
Oklahoma 4	Tom Steed	Democratic	1948	Incumbent re-elected.	▌ ✓ Tom Steed (Democratic) 50.2%; ▌Truman T. Branscum (Republican) 49.8%
Oklahoma 5	John Jarman	Democratic	1950	Incumbent re-elected.	▌ ✓ John Jarman (Democratic) 69.6%; ▌Melvin H. Gragg (Republican) 30.4%
Oklahoma 6	Jed Johnson Jr.	Democratic	1964	Incumbent lost re-election. Republican gain.	▌ ✓ James Vernon Smith (Republican) 51.4%; ▌Jed Johnson Jr. (Democratic) 48.6%

== Oregon ==
District	Incumbent			This race	
District	Member	Party	First elected	Results	Candidates
Oregon 1	Wendell Wyatt	Republican	1964	Incumbent re-elected.	▌ ✓ Wendell Wyatt (Republican) 74.3%; ▌Malcolm Cross (Democratic) 25.7%
Oregon 2	Al Ullman	Democratic	1956	Incumbent re-elected.	▌ ✓ Al Ullman (Democratic) 63.3%; ▌Everett J. Thoren (Republican) 36.7%
Oregon 3	Edith Green	Democratic	1954	Incumbent re-elected.	▌ ✓ Edith Green (Democratic) 67.0%; ▌Lyle Dean (Republican) 33.0%
Oregon 4	Robert B. Duncan	Democratic	1962	Incumbent retired to run for U.S. Senator. Republican gain.	▌ ✓ John R. Dellenback (Republican) 62.7%; ▌Charles O. Porter (Democratic) 37.3%

== Pennsylvania ==
District	Incumbent			This race	
District	Member	Party	First elected	Results	Candidates
Pennsylvania 1	William A. Barrett	Democratic	1944; 1946 (lost); 1948	Incumbent re-elected.	▌ ✓ William A. Barrett (Democratic) 66.1%; ▌Beatrice Chernock (Republican) 33.9%
Pennsylvania 2	Robert N. C. Nix Sr.	Democratic	1958	Incumbent re-elected.	▌ ✓ Robert N. C. Nix Sr. (Democratic) 59.9%; ▌Herbert R. Cain Jr. (Republican) 40.1%
Pennsylvania 3	James A. Byrne	Democratic	1952	Incumbent re-elected.	▌ ✓ James A. Byrne (Democratic) 56.6%; ▌Walter T. Darmopray (Republican) 43.4%
Pennsylvania 4	Herman Toll	Democratic	1958	Incumbent retired. Democratic hold.	▌ ✓ Joshua Eilberg (Democratic) 51.9%; ▌Robert Bear Cohen (Republican) 48.1%
Pennsylvania 5	William J. Green III	Democratic	1964	Incumbent re-elected.	▌ ✓ William J. Green III (Democratic) 59.1%; ▌Michael J. Bednarek (Republican) 40.9%
Pennsylvania 6	George M. Rhodes	Democratic	1948	Incumbent re-elected.	▌ ✓ George M. Rhodes (Democratic) 56.1%; ▌Daniel B. Boyer Jr. (Republican) 43.9%
Pennsylvania 7	None (district created)			New seat. Republican gain.	▌ ✓ Lawrence G. Williams (Republican) 63.2%; ▌John J. Logue (Democratic) 36.8%
Pennsylvania 8	Willard S. Curtin	Republican	1956	Incumbent retired. Republican hold.	▌ ✓ Edward G. Biester Jr. (Republican) 59.1%; ▌Walter S. Farley Jr. (Democratic) 40.9%
Pennsylvania 9	George Watkins; Redistricted from the 7th district	Republican	1964	Incumbent re-elected.	▌ ✓ George Watkins (Republican) 62.6%; ▌John A. O'Brien (Democratic) 37.4%
Pennsylvania 9	Paul B. Dague	Republican	1946	Incumbent retired. Republican loss.	▌ ✓ George Watkins (Republican) 62.6%; ▌John A. O'Brien (Democratic) 37.4%
Pennsylvania 10	Joseph M. McDade	Republican	1962	Incumbent re-elected.	▌ ✓ Joseph M. McDade (Republican) 66.8%; ▌Neil Trama (Democratic) 33.2%
Pennsylvania 11	Dan Flood	Democratic	1944; 1946 (lost); 1948; 1952 (lost); 1954	Incumbent re-elected.	▌ ✓ Dan Flood (Democratic) 67.2%; ▌Gerald C. Broadt (Republican) 32.8%
Pennsylvania 12	J. Irving Whalley	Republican	1960	Incumbent re-elected.	▌ ✓ J. Irving Whalley (Republican) 66.9%; ▌J. Robert Rohm (Democratic) 33.1%
Pennsylvania 13	Richard Schweiker	Republican	1960	Incumbent re-elected.	▌ ✓ Richard Schweiker (Republican) 72.5%; ▌William D. Searle (Democratic) 27.5%
Pennsylvania 14	William S. Moorhead	Democratic	1958	Incumbent re-elected.	▌ ✓ William S. Moorhead (Democratic) 68.3%; ▌Dick Thornburgh (Republican) 31.7%
Pennsylvania 15	Fred B. Rooney	Democratic	1963 (special)	Incumbent re-elected.	▌ ✓ Fred B. Rooney (Democratic) 52.4%; ▌George J. Joseph (Republican) 47.6%
Pennsylvania 16	John C. Kunkel	Republican	1961 (special)	Incumbent retired. Republican hold.	▌ ✓ Edwin D. Eshleman (Republican) 69.2%; ▌Richard F. Charles (Democratic) 30.8%
Pennsylvania 17	Herman T. Schneebeli	Republican	1960	Incumbent re-elected.	▌ ✓ Herman T. Schneebeli (Republican) 66.2%; ▌William Conrad Reuter (Democratic) 33.8%
Pennsylvania 18	Robert J. Corbett	Republican	1938; 1940 (lost); 1944	Incumbent re-elected.	▌ ✓ Robert J. Corbett (Republican) 67.1%; ▌John R. Wohlfarth (Democratic) 32.9%
Pennsylvania 19	Nathaniel N. Craley Jr.	Democratic	1964	Incumbent lost re-election. Republican gain.	▌ ✓ George A. Goodling (Republican) 51.7%; ▌Nathaniel N. Craley Jr. (Democratic) 48.3%
Pennsylvania 20	Elmer J. Holland	Democratic	1942 (special); 1942 (retired); 1956 (special)	Incumbent re-elected.	▌ ✓ Elmer J. Holland (Democratic) 65.9%; ▌Joseph Sabol Jr. (Republican) 34.1%
Pennsylvania 21	John Herman Dent	Democratic	1958	Incumbent re-elected.	▌ ✓ John Herman Dent (Democratic) 64.2%; ▌Edward B. Byrne (Republican) 35.8%
Pennsylvania 22	John P. Saylor	Republican	1949 (special)	Incumbent re-elected.	▌ ✓ John P. Saylor (Republican) 67.5%; ▌Frank H. Buck (Democratic) 32.5%
Pennsylvania 23	Albert W. Johnson	Republican	1963 (special)	Incumbent re-elected.	▌ ✓ Albert W. Johnson (Republican) 62.8%; ▌Robert Mitchell (Democratic) 37.2%
Pennsylvania 24	Joseph P. Vigorito	Democratic	1964	Incumbent re-elected.	▌ ✓ Joseph P. Vigorito (Democratic) 55.3%; ▌James D. Weaver (Republican) 44.7%
Pennsylvania 25	Frank M. Clark	Democratic	1954	Incumbent re-elected.	▌ ✓ Frank M. Clark (Democratic) 64.5%; ▌John F. Heath (Republican) 35.5%
Pennsylvania 26	Thomas E. Morgan	Democratic	1944	Incumbent re-elected.	▌ ✓ Thomas E. Morgan (Democratic) 64.1%; ▌Paul P. Riggle (Republican) 35.9%
Pennsylvania 27	James G. Fulton	Republican	1944	Incumbent re-elected.	▌ ✓ James G. Fulton (Republican) 67.7%; ▌Stephen J. Arnold (Democratic) 32.3%

== Rhode Island ==
District	Incumbent			This race	
District	Member	Party	First elected	Results	Candidates
Rhode Island 1	Fernand St Germain	Democratic	1960	Incumbent re-elected.	▌ ✓ Fernand St Germain (Democratic) 56.8%; ▌Raymond W. Houghton (Republican) 43.2%
Rhode Island 2	John E. Fogarty	Democratic	1940	Incumbent re-elected.	▌ ✓ John E. Fogarty (Democratic) 64.7%; ▌Everett C. Sammartino (Republican) 35.3%

== South Carolina ==
District	Incumbent			This race	
District	Member	Party	First elected	Results	Candidates
South Carolina 1	L. Mendel Rivers	Democratic	1940	Incumbent re-elected.	▌ ✓ L. Mendel Rivers (Democratic) Unopposed
South Carolina 2	Albert Watson	Republican	1962	Incumbent re-elected.	▌ ✓ Albert Watson (Republican) 64.3%; ▌Fred LeClercq (Democratic) 35.7%
South Carolina 3	William J. B. Dorn	Democratic	1946; 1948 (retired); 1950	Incumbent re-elected.	▌ ✓ William J. B. Dorn (Democratic) 57.8%; ▌John Grisso (Republican) 42.2%
South Carolina 4	Robert T. Ashmore	Democratic	1953 (special)	Incumbent re-elected.	▌ ✓ Robert T. Ashmore (Democratic) Unopposed
South Carolina 5	Thomas S. Gettys	Democratic	1964	Incumbent re-elected.	▌ ✓ Thomas S. Gettys (Democratic) Unopposed
South Carolina 6	John L. McMillan	Democratic	1938	Incumbent re-elected.	▌ ✓ John L. McMillan (Democratic) 61.7%; ▌Archie Odom (Republican) 38.3%

== South Dakota ==
District	Incumbent			This race	
District	Member	Party	First elected	Results	Candidates
South Dakota 1	Ben Reifel	Republican	1960	Incumbent re-elected.	▌ ✓ Ben Reifel (Republican) 66.7%; ▌Francis Richter (Democratic) 33.3%
South Dakota 2	E. Y. Berry	Republican	1950	Incumbent re-elected.	▌ ✓ E. Y. Berry (Republican) 60.5%; ▌Jack P. Allmon (Democratic) 39.5%

== Tennessee ==
District	Incumbent			This race	
District	Member	Party	First elected	Results	Candidates
Tennessee 1	Jimmy Quillen	Republican	1962	Incumbent re-elected.	▌ ✓ Jimmy Quillen (Republican) 87.1%; ▌Temus Bright (Independent) 12.9%
Tennessee 2	John Duncan Sr.	Republican	1964	Incumbent re-elected.	▌ ✓ John Duncan Sr. (Republican) 78.9%; ▌Jake Armstrong (Democratic) 21.1%
Tennessee 3	Bill Brock	Republican	1962	Incumbent re-elected.	▌ ✓ Bill Brock (Republican) 64.2%; ▌Franklin Haney (Democratic) 35.8%
Tennessee 4	Joe L. Evins	Democratic	1946	Incumbent re-elected.	▌ ✓ Joe L. Evins (Democratic) 90.0%; ▌William Bean (Independent) 10.0%
Tennessee 5	Richard Fulton	Democratic	1962	Incumbent re-elected.	▌ ✓ Richard Fulton (Democratic) 63.0%; ▌George Kelly (Republican) 37.0%
Tennessee 6	William Anderson	Democratic	1964	Incumbent re-elected.	▌ ✓ William Anderson (Democratic) 79.6%; ▌Cecil R. Hill (Independent) 20.4%
Tennessee 7	Tom J. Murray	Democratic	1942	Incumbent lost renomination. Democratic hold.	▌ ✓ Ray Blanton (Democratic) 50.6%; ▌Julius Hurst (Republican) 48.4%; ▌L. B. Winfield (Independent) 1.0%
Tennessee 8	Fats Everett	Democratic	1958	Incumbent re-elected.	▌ ✓ Fats Everett (Democratic) 75.2%; ▌Jim Boyd (Republican) 24.8%
Tennessee 9	George W. Grider	Democratic	1964	Incumbent lost re-election. Republican gain.	▌ ✓ Dan Kuykendall (Republican) 52.2%; ▌George W. Grider (Democratic) 47.8%

== Texas ==
Texas redistricted for this election, eliminating its at-large district and removing two East Texas districts in favor of adding three districts in South Texas, suburban Houston, and suburban Dallas.

District	Incumbent			This race	
District	Member	Party	First elected	Results	Candidates
Texas 1	Wright Patman	Democratic	1928	Incumbent re-elected.	▌ ✓ Wright Patman (Democratic) Unopposed
Texas 2	John Dowdy; Redistricted from the 7th district	Democratic	1952	Incumbent re-elected.	▌ ✓ John Dowdy (Democratic) Unopposed
Texas 3	Joe R. Pool; Redistricted from the at-large seat	Democratic	1962	Incumbent re-elected.	▌ ✓ Joe R. Pool (Democratic) 53.4%; ▌Bill Hayes (Republican) 46.6%
Texas 4	Ray Roberts	Democratic	1962	Incumbent re-elected.	▌ ✓ Ray Roberts (Democratic) Unopposed
Texas 4	Lindley Beckworth; Redistricted from the 3rd district	Democratic	1956	Incumbent lost renomination. Democratic loss.	▌ ✓ Ray Roberts (Democratic) Unopposed
Texas 5	Earle Cabell	Democratic	1964	Incumbent re-elected.	▌ ✓ Earle Cabell (Democratic) 61.0%; ▌Duke Burgess (Republican) 39.0%
Texas 6	Olin E. Teague	Democratic	1946	Incumbent re-elected.	▌ ✓ Olin E. Teague (Democratic) Unopposed
Texas 7	None (district created)			New seat. Republican gain.	▌ ✓ George H. W. Bush (Republican) 57.1%; ▌Frank Briscoe (Democratic) 42.4%; ▌Bob Gray (Constitution) 0.5%
Texas 8	Lera Millard Thomas	Democratic	1966	Incumbent retired. Democratic hold.	▌ ✓ Robert C. Eckhardt (Democratic) 92.3%; ▌W. D. Spayne (Republican) 7.7%
Texas 9	Jack Brooks; Redistricted from the 2nd district	Democratic	1952	Incumbent re-elected.	▌ ✓ Jack Brooks (Democratic) Unopposed
Texas 9	Clark W. Thompson	Democratic	1947 (special)	Incumbent retired. Democratic loss.	▌ ✓ Jack Brooks (Democratic) Unopposed
Texas 10	J. J. Pickle	Democratic	1963 (special)	Incumbent re-elected.	▌ ✓ J. J. Pickle (Democratic) 74.3%; ▌Jane Sumner (Republican) 24.6%; ▌R. R. Richter (Constitution) 1.1%
Texas 11	William R. Poage	Democratic	1936	Incumbent re-elected.	▌ ✓ William R. Poage (Democratic) 94.9%; ▌Laurel N. Dunn (Conservative) 5.1%
Texas 12	Jim Wright	Democratic	1954	Incumbent re-elected.	▌ ✓ Jim Wright (Democratic) Unopposed
Texas 13	Graham B. Purcell Jr.	Democratic	1962	Incumbent re-elected.	▌ ✓ Graham B. Purcell Jr. (Democratic) 57.1%; ▌D. C. Norwood (Republican) 42.9%
Texas 14	John Andrew Young	Democratic	1956	Incumbent re-elected.	▌ ✓ John Andrew Young (Democratic) Unopposed
Texas 15	Kika de la Garza	Democratic	1964	Incumbent re-elected.	▌ ✓ Kika de la Garza (Democratic) Unopposed
Texas 16	Richard Crawford White	Democratic	1964	Incumbent re-elected.	▌ ✓ Richard Crawford White (Democratic) Unopposed
Texas 17	Omar Burleson	Democratic	1946	Incumbent re-elected.	▌ ✓ Omar Burleson (Democratic) Unopposed
Texas 18	Walter E. Rogers	Democratic	1950	Incumbent retired. Republican gain.	▌ ✓ Robert Price (Republican) 59.5%; ▌Dee Miller (Democratic) 40.5%
Texas 19	George H. Mahon	Democratic	1934	Incumbent re-elected.	▌ ✓ George H. Mahon (Democratic) Unopposed
Texas 20	Henry B. González	Democratic	1961 (special)	Incumbent re-elected.	▌ ✓ Henry B. González (Democratic) 87.1%; ▌Robert C. Moore (Conservative) 7.8%; ▌Bert Ellis (Constitution) 5.1%
Texas 21	O. C. Fisher	Democratic	1942	Incumbent re-elected.	▌ ✓ O. C. Fisher (Democratic) Unopposed
Texas 22	Robert R. Casey	Democratic	1958	Incumbent re-elected.	▌ ✓ Robert R. Casey (Democratic) Unopposed
Texas 23	None (district created)			New seat. Democratic gain.	▌ ✓ Abraham Kazen (Democratic) 96.4%; ▌Richard K. Troxell (Constitution) 3.6%

== Utah ==
District	Incumbent			This race	
District	Member	Party	First elected	Results	Candidates
Utah 1	Laurence J. Burton	Republican	1962	Incumbent re-elected.	▌ ✓ Laurence J. Burton (Republican) 66.5%; ▌J. Keith Melville (Democratic) 33.5%
Utah 2	David S. King	Democratic	1964	Incumbent lost re-election. Republican gain.	▌ ✓ Sherman P. Lloyd (Republican) 61.3%; ▌David S. King (Democratic) 38.7%

== Vermont ==
District	Incumbent			This race	
District	Member	Party	First elected	Results	Candidates
Vermont at-large	Robert Stafford	Republican	1960	Incumbent re-elected.	▌ ✓ Robert Stafford (Republican) 65.6%; ▌William J. Ryan (Democratic) 34.4%

== Virginia ==
District	Incumbent			This race	
District	Member	Party	First elected	Results	Candidates
Virginia 1	Thomas N. Downing	Democratic	1958	Incumbent re-elected.	▌ ✓ Thomas N. Downing (Democratic) Unopposed
Virginia 2	Porter Hardy Jr.	Democratic	1946	Incumbent re-elected.	▌ ✓ Porter Hardy Jr. (Democratic) Unopposed
Virginia 3	David E. Satterfield III	Democratic	1964	Incumbent re-elected.	▌ ✓ David E. Satterfield III (Democratic) Unopposed
Virginia 4	Watkins Abbitt	Democratic	1948	Incumbent re-elected.	▌ ✓ Watkins Abbitt (Democratic) 66.5%; ▌Edward J. SIlverman (Independent) 21.8%; ▌Others 11.6%
Virginia 5	William M. Tuck	Democratic	1953 (special)	Incumbent re-elected.	▌ ✓ William M. Tuck (Democratic) 56.2%; ▌Robert L. Gilliam (Republican) 43.8%
Virginia 6	Richard H. Poff	Republican	1952	Incumbent re-elected.	▌ ✓ Richard H. Poff (Republican) 80.8%; ▌Murray A. Stoller (Democratic) 19.2%
Virginia 7	John O. Marsh Jr.	Democratic	1962	Incumbent re-elected.	▌ ✓ John O. Marsh Jr. (Democratic) 59.3%; ▌Edward O. McCue III (Republican) 40.7%
Virginia 8	Howard W. Smith	Democratic	1930	Incumbent lost renomination. Republican gain.	▌ ✓ William L. Scott (Republican) 57.2%; ▌George Rawlings (Democratic) 42.8%
Virginia 9	W. Pat Jennings	Democratic	1954	Incumbent lost re-election. Republican gain.	▌ ✓ William C. Wampler (Republican) 53.7%; ▌W. Pat Jennings (Democratic) 46.3%
Virginia 10	Joel Broyhill	Republican	1952	Incumbent re-elected.	▌ ✓ Joel Broyhill (Republican) 58.3%; ▌Clive L. DuVal II (Democratic) 41.7%

== Washington ==
District	Incumbent			This race	
District	Member	Party	First elected	Results	Candidates
Washington 1	Thomas Pelly	Republican	1952	Incumbent re-elected.	▌ ✓ Thomas Pelly (Republican) 80.3%; ▌Alice Franklin Bryant (Democratic) 19.7%
Washington 2	Lloyd Meeds	Democratic	1964	Incumbent re-elected.	▌ ✓ Lloyd Meeds (Democratic) 60.7%; ▌Eugene M. Smith (Republican) 36.0%; ▌George E. Pittan (Conservative) 2.4%; ▌Frank L. Batterson (Peace and Freedom) 0.9%
Washington 3	Julia Butler Hansen	Democratic	1960	Incumbent re-elected.	▌ ✓ Julia Butler Hansen (Democratic) 65.7%; ▌Keith Kisor (Republican) 34.3%
Washington 4	Catherine Dean May	Republican	1958	Incumbent re-elected.	▌ ✓ Catherine Dean May (Republican) 62.1%; ▌Gustav Bansmer (Democratic) 30.3%; ▌Floyd Paxton (Conservative) 7.6%
Washington 5	Tom Foley	Democratic	1964	Incumbent re-elected.	▌ ✓ Tom Foley (Democratic) 56.5%; ▌Dorothy R. Powers (Republican) 43.5%
Washington 6	Floyd Hicks	Democratic	1964	Incumbent re-elected.	▌ ✓ Floyd Hicks (Democratic) 60.4%; ▌George Mahler (Republican) 39.6%
Washington 7	Brock Adams	Democratic	1964	Incumbent re-elected.	▌ ✓ Brock Adams (Democratic) 62.8%; ▌James Munn (Republican) 36.0%; ▌Robert B. Shaw (Peace and Freedom) 1.2%

== West Virginia ==
District	Incumbent			This race	
District	Member	Party	First elected	Results	Candidates
West Virginia 1	Arch A. Moore Jr.	Republican	1956	Incumbent re-elected.	▌ ✓ Arch A. Moore Jr. (Republican) 70.9%; ▌William M. Kidd (Democratic) 29.1%
West Virginia 2	Harley Orrin Staggers	Democratic	1948	Incumbent re-elected.	▌ ✓ Harley Orrin Staggers (Democratic) 60.3%; ▌George L. Strader (Republican) 39.7%
West Virginia 3	John M. Slack Jr.	Democratic	1958	Incumbent re-elected.	▌ ✓ John M. Slack Jr. (Democratic) 61.6%; ▌Mal Guthrie (Republican) 38.4%
West Virginia 4	Ken Hechler	Democratic	1958	Incumbent re-elected.	▌ ✓ Ken Hechler (Democratic) 59.7%; ▌Harry D. Humphreys (Republican) 40.3%
West Virginia 5	James Kee	Democratic	1964	Incumbent re-elected.	▌ ✓ James Kee (Democratic) 63.6%; ▌Elizabeth Ann Bowen (Republican) 36.4%

== Wisconsin ==
District	Incumbent			This race	
District	Member	Party	First elected	Results	Candidates
Wisconsin 1	Lynn E. Stalbaum	Democratic	1964	Incumbent lost re-election. Republican gain.	▌ ✓ Henry C. Schadeberg (Republican) 51.0%; ▌Lynn E. Stalbaum (Democratic) 49.0%
Wisconsin 2	Robert Kastenmeier	Democratic	1958	Incumbent re-elected.	▌ ✓ Robert Kastenmeier (Democratic) 58.0%; ▌William B. Smith (Republican) 42.0%
Wisconsin 3	Vernon W. Thomson	Republican	1960	Incumbent re-elected.	▌ ✓ Vernon W. Thomson (Republican) 68.8%; ▌John D. Rice (Democratic) 31.2%
Wisconsin 4	Clement Zablocki	Democratic	1948	Incumbent re-elected.	▌ ✓ Clement Zablocki (Democratic) 74.3%; ▌James E. Laessig (Republican) 25.7%
Wisconsin 5	Henry S. Reuss	Democratic	1954	Incumbent re-elected.	▌ ✓ Henry S. Reuss (Democratic) 70.0%; ▌Curtis T. Pechtel (Republican) 29.7%; ▌James E. Boulton (Independent) 0.3%
Wisconsin 6	John Abner Race	Democratic	1964	Incumbent lost re-election. Republican gain.	▌ ✓ William A. Steiger (Republican) 52.4%; ▌John Abner Race (Democratic) 47.6%
Wisconsin 7	Melvin Laird	Republican	1952	Incumbent re-elected.	▌ ✓ Melvin Laird (Republican) 65.1%; ▌Norman Myhra (Democratic) 34.9%
Wisconsin 8	John W. Byrnes	Republican	1944	Incumbent re-elected.	▌ ✓ John W. Byrnes (Republican) 61.3%; ▌Marvin S. Kagen (Democratic) 38.7%
Wisconsin 9	Glenn Robert Davis	Republican	1947 (special); 1956 (retired); 1964	Incumbent re-elected.	▌ ✓ Glenn Robert Davis (Republican) 64.1%; ▌James P. Buckley (Democratic) 35.9%
Wisconsin 10	Alvin O'Konski	Republican	1942	Incumbent re-elected.	▌ ✓ Alvin O'Konski (Republican) 66.5%; ▌Carl Lauri (Democratic) 33.5%

== Wyoming ==
District	Incumbent			This race	
District	Member	Party	First elected	Results	Candidates
Wyoming at-large	Teno Roncalio	Democratic	1964	Incumbent retired to run for U.S. Senator. Republican gain.	▌ ✓ William Henry Harrison III (Republican) 52.7%; ▌Al Christian (Democratic) 47.3%

== See also ==
- 1966 United States elections
  - 1966 United States gubernatorial elections
  - 1966 United States Senate elections
- 89th United States Congress
- 90th United States Congress

== Works cited ==
- Abramson, Paul; Aldrich, John; Rohde, David (1995). Change and Continuity in the 1992 Elections. CQ Press. ISBN 0871878399.
