= Goodling =

Goodling is a surname. Notable people with the surname include:

- George Atlee Goodling (1896–1982), Republican member of the U.S. House of Representatives from Pennsylvania
- Monica Goodling (born 1973), former US government lawyer and political appointee in the George W. Bush administration
- William F. Goodling (1927–2017), Republican member of the U.S. House of Representatives from Pennsylvania

== See also ==
- William F. Goodling Child Nutrition Reauthorization Act of 1998 (P.L. 105–336) extended expiring authorizations for child nutrition and commodity assistance programs, and the WIC program, through FY2003
