= L. William Seidman =

American economist (1921–2009)

William Seidman
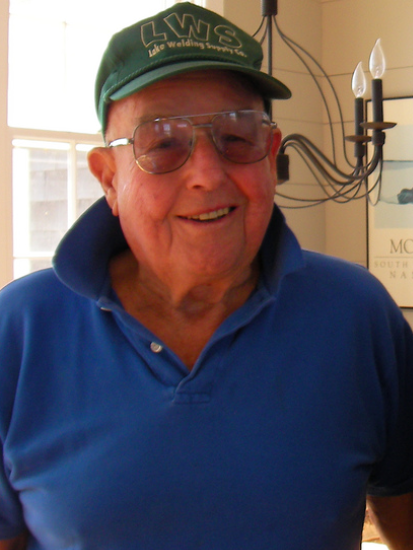

Chair of the Federal Deposit Insurance Corporation
- In office October 21, 1985 – October 16, 1991
- President: Ronald Reagan; George H. W. Bush
- Preceded by: William Isaac
- Succeeded by: Andrew C. Hove, Jr.

Personal details
- Born: Lewis William Seidman; April 29, 1921 Grand Rapids, Michigan, U.S.
- Died: May 13, 2009 (aged 88) Albuquerque, New Mexico, U.S.
- Party: Republican
- Education: Dartmouth College (BA); Harvard University (JD); University of Michigan, Ann Arbor (MBA)

Lewis William Seidman (April 29, 1921 – May 13, 2009) was an American economist, financial commentator, and former head of the U.S. Federal Deposit Insurance Corporation, best known for his role in helping work to correct the Savings and Loan Crisis in the American financial sector from 1988 to 1991 as head of the Resolution Trust Corporation. He also worked as an economic adviser during three separate administrations of United States presidents: Gerald Ford, Ronald Reagan, and George H. W. Bush. He was lauded by both Republicans and Democrats for his work in cleaning up the frauds of the Savings and Loan disaster, but was pushed out of American government by the George H.W. Bush administration for disclosing the full extent of the crisis to the United States Congress and taxpayers.

== Life and career ==
=== Early life ===
Seidman was born to a Jewish family on April 29, 1921, in Grand Rapids, Michigan, the son of Esther (Lubetsky) and Francis Edward Seidman, a founder of the accounting firm Seidman and Seidman. Seidman received his undergraduate education at Dartmouth College, his Juris Doctor degree from Harvard University, and his Master's Degree In Business Administration from the University of Michigan's Ross School of Business. He married a onetime University of Michigan beauty queen named Sarah "Sally" Berry—later and better known as Sally Seidman; they later had six children. He served in the United States Navy as an officer on a destroyer in the Pacific theater during World War II and won a Bronze Star.

From 1950 to 1974, Seidman worked in the accounting firm of Seidman & Seidman, which his father and uncles had founded, and served as its managing partner from 1968 to 1974. The firm later merged with another accounting entity, BDO USA, to become BDO Seidman, a nationally active accounting firm. By 1960, Seidman was a prominent business leader in Grand Rapids, and was one of the principal founders of Grand Valley State University, helping galvanize local support in the community for the establishment of a public four-year university in West Michigan. Seidman later said that even though he rose to become Chairman of the FDIC, his proudest accomplishment was his role in the founding of GVSU. In 1962, Seidman was the Republican nominee for the position of Michigan Auditor General, but was defeated by incumbent Billie S. Farnum.

=== Federal government career ===
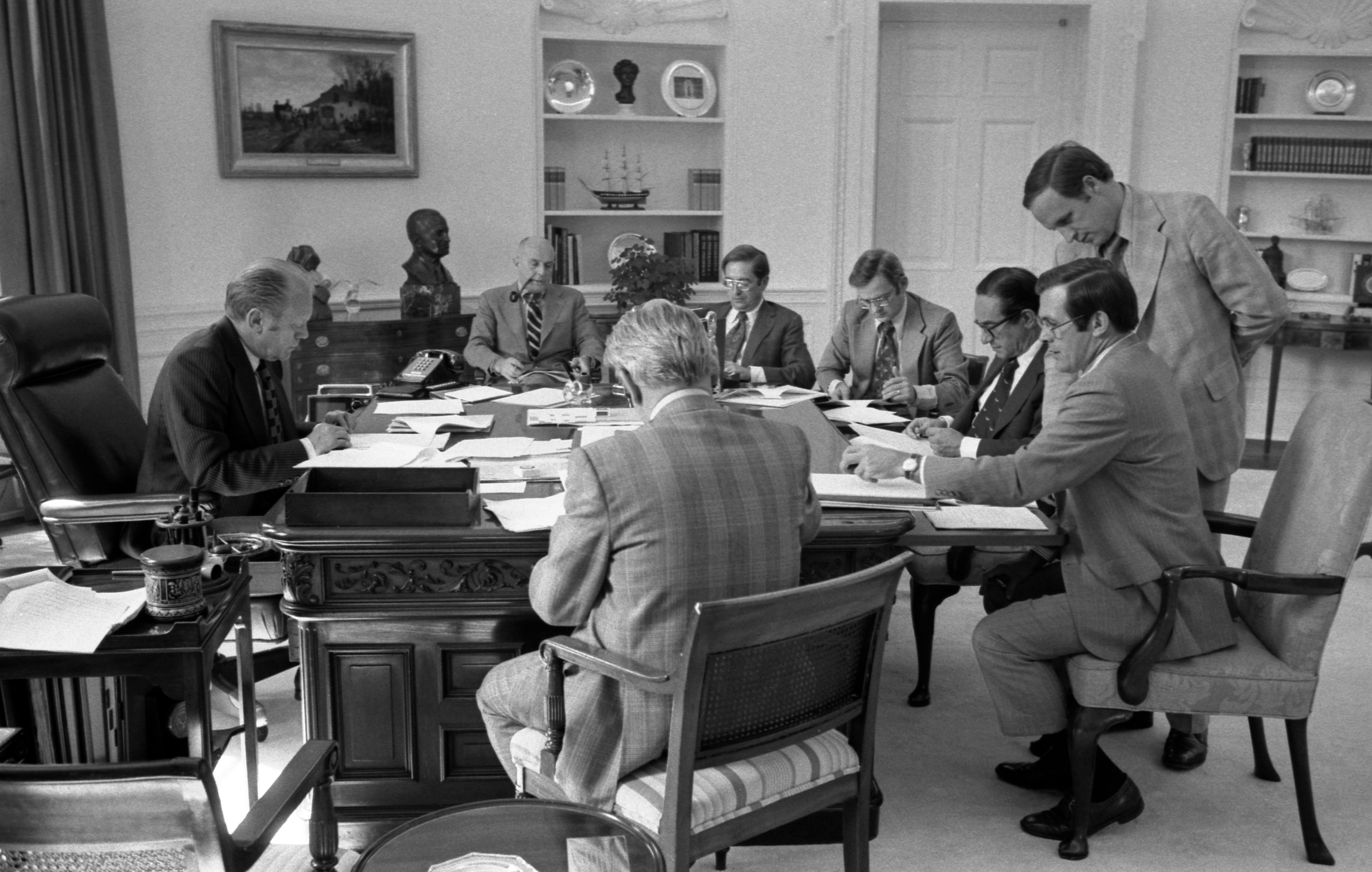
President Gerald Ford and staff review a draft of his address to the Nation on recommendations for tax reduction and spending, to be delivered that evening. Clockwise: President Ford, Economic Affairs Assistant L. William Seidman, OMB Director James Thomas Lynn, OMB Deputy Director Paul H. O'Neill, Council of Economic Advisers (CEA) Chairman Alan Greenspan, Deputy Assistant to the President for White House Operations Dick Cheney, Assistant to the President for White House Operations Don Rumsfeld, Assistant Secretary of the Treasury for Tax Policy Charles M. Walker.

After Richard Nixon's administration was toppled by the Watergate scandal in 1974 and Nixon resigned from the presidency, Gerald Ford—who had attended school with Seidman—became president during a time of economic recession in America, and tapped Seidman for an economic advisory post to work on pressing economic problems (such as the choice of whether or not to bail out New York City from its pending bankruptcy—Ford later chose against doing this). Seidman served in this capacity until 1976, then returned to the private sector.

In 1978, Seidman also founded The Washington Campus, an executive education organization which began as a consortium of U.S. business schools dedicated to educating business leaders on the public policy process.

Seidman was tapped again as an economic advisor, by President Ronald Reagan from 1982 to 1984. He famously feuded with Bush White House Chief of Staff John H. Sununu. He also served as Dean of the College of Business at Arizona State University from 1982 to 1985. In 1985, he became the chairman of the Federal Deposit Insurance Corporation and served until 1991, working extensively during the American savings and loan crisis to restore solvency to the failing savings and loan sector of American banking. He was the first chairman of the related agency, the Resolution Trust Corporation, which was created specifically to address issues arising from the savings and loan crisis, from 1989 until his retirement from active government in 1991—his ouster from the FDIC Chairman position was orchestrated by the George H.W. Bush administration, who felt Seidman's full disclosure about Savings and Loan fraud might be damaging to that administration's interests, according to the New York Times. Neil Bush was, at the time, being investigated at Silverado Savings And Loan.

Nevertheless, Seidman's work was seen as crucial in terms of providing stability to the American banking system and helping provide a foundation for the prosperity of the 1990s in the United States, and he was given credit by members of both major parties—for instance, Sen. Charles Schumer (then a House Representative), even though Schumer was a prominent Democrat and Seidman was a Republican, said that "One of the bright spots in this whole mess has been Mr. Seidman".

=== Later life ===
He worked as a chief financial commentator for the CNBC network, as well as an occasional speaker at various financial conferences worldwide. In 2005, he debated former vice-president Al Gore on economic matters at The Asian Banker Summit in Singapore March 15–17, 2005. He spoke at four events in Asia from 2005 to 2007. By the end of his life, he was serving as an advisor to SecondMarket, continued his work as a CNBC financial commentator, and was also a former advisory board member to the Keating Network LLC, a company seeking to connect small and medium-sized businesses. He was, by the time of his death, a sought-after commentator and financial speaker on financial affairs worldwide.

In the last year of his life, Seidman was critical of rescuing the banks' managements and their shareholders during the Troubled Asset Relief Program, comparing the bailout with action he and his team at the Resolution Trust Corporation took during the S&L crisis of the 1980s: "What we did, we took over the bank, nationalized it, fired the management, took out the bad assets and put a good bank back in the system."

Seidman died of complications from a sudden attack of pneumonia after an intercontinental airline flight in Albuquerque, New Mexico at the age of 88. He was interred at his ranch in Wagon Mound, New Mexico.

== Honors ==
The FDIC office complex in Arlington, VA is named for Seidman. Arizona State University named a research institute in his honor. The Seidman College of Business at Grand Valley State University also bears his name.

== Books ==
- Lewis William Seidman (2000). Full Faith and Credit: The Great S & L Debacle and Other Washington Sagas. Beard Books. ISBN 978-1-893122-49-9.
- Lewis William Seidman; Steven L. Skancke (August 1990). Productivity the American advantage: how 50 U.S. companies are regaining the competitive edge. Simon and Schuster. ISBN 978-0-671-70219-9.

== See also ==
- S&L Crisis
- Federal Deposit Insurance Corporation
- Neil Bush and Silverado Savings And Loan

== Additional sources ==
- LWSeidman obituary – 5/14/09 LATimes
- Seidman's obituary in the Boston Globe

Party political offices
Preceded by John V. Clements	Republican nominee for Michigan Auditor General; 1962	Succeeded by None
