= Nathaniel N. Craley Jr. =

American politician

Nathaniel Neiman Craley Jr.
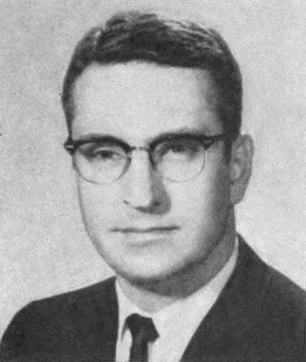

Member of the U.S. House of Representatives from Pennsylvania's 19th district
- In office January 3, 1965 – January 3, 1967
- Preceded by: George Atlee Goodling
- Succeeded by: George Atlee Goodling

Personal details
- Born: November 17, 1927 Red Lion, Pennsylvania, U.S.
- Died: June 18, 2006 (aged 78) Glen Rock, Pennsylvania, U.S.
- Party: Democratic

Nathaniel Neiman Craley Jr. (November 17, 1927 – June 18, 2006) was a Democratic member of the U.S. House of Representatives from Pennsylvania.

Nathaniel Craley was born in Red Lion, Pennsylvania. He graduated from the Taft School in Watertown, Connecticut, in 1946 and from Gettysburg College in 1950. He was engaged in furniture manufacturing from 1950 to 1965. He was treasurer of the York County Planning Commission from 1959 to 1965. He was the director and first vice president of York County Council of Community Services, 1960–1964, and director of York County Council for Human Relations, 1960-1963. He became chairman of the York County Democratic committee from 1962 to 1964. He was an instructor in economics and history at York Junior College from 1958 to 1959.

He was elected in 1964 as a Democrat to the 89th United States Congress. He was an unsuccessful candidate for reelection in 1966. After his term in office, he served in a number of positions in the Pacific Island territories of the United States:

- Commissioner for Public Affairs for the Trust Territory of the Pacific Islands, 1967–1972
- Special Assistant to the High Commissioner, 1972–1976
- Executive Director of the Plebiscite Commission of the Northern Mariana Islands, 1975
- Special Assistant to the Resident Commissioner, Commonwealth of Northern Mariana Islands, 1976–1978
- Director for Administration, Trust Territory of the Pacific Islands, 1978–1981
- Special Assistant to the High Commissioner, 1981–1985

He died in Glen Rock, Pennsylvania, aged 78, of undisclosed causes.

== Sources ==
- United States Congress. "Nathaniel N. Craley (id: C000866)". Biographical Directory of the United States Congress.
- Nathaniel Craley at The Political Graveyard
- Nathaniel Craley's Obituary at the Saipan Tribune

U.S. House of Representatives
Preceded by George Atlee Goodling	Member of the U.S. House of Representatives from Pennsylvania's 19th congressional district 1965–1967	Succeeded by George Atlee Goodling
