= Michigan's 19th congressional district =

Obsolete U.S. House district

Coordinates: 42°45′N 83°23′W

- Obsolete district
- Created: 1965
- Eliminated: 1980
- Years active: 1965-1983

Michigan's 19th congressional district is an obsolete United States congressional district in Michigan. The first candidate elected from the newly created district was Billie S. Farnum in 1964. It was eliminated as a result of the redistricting cycle after the 1980 census.

The last representative from the district, William Broomfield, was subsequently elected from the 18th district after dissolution of this district.

== List of members representing the district ==
Member	Party	Tenure	Cong ress	Electoral history
District created January 3, 1965
Billie S. Farnum (Drayton Plains)	Democratic	January 3, 1965 – January 3, 1967	89th	Elected in 1964. Lost re-election.
Jack H. McDonald (Detroit)	Republican	January 3, 1967 – January 3, 1973	90th 91st 92nd	Elected in 1966. Re-elected in 1968. Re-elected in 1970. Lost renomination.
William Broomfield (Birmingham)	Republican	January 3, 1973 – January 3, 1983	93rd 94th 95th 96th 97th	Redistricted from the 18th district and re-elected in 1972. Re-elected in 1974. Re-elected in 1976. Re-elected in 1978. Re-elected in 1980. Redistricted to the 18th district.
District eliminated January 3, 1983
