= 1962 Michigan Auditor General election =

- November 6, 1962
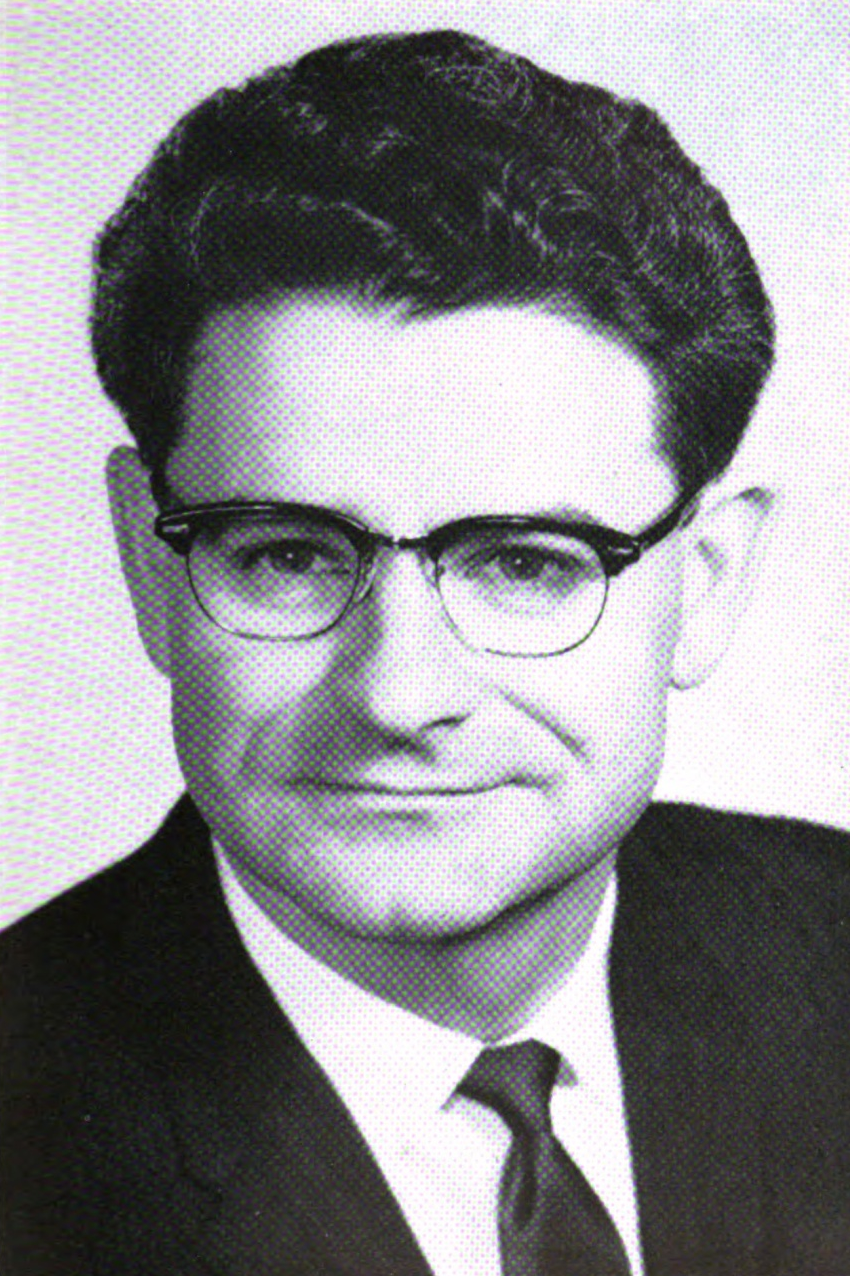

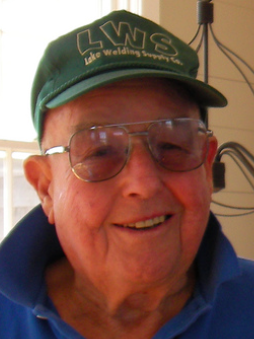
Nominee	Billie S. Farnum	L. William Seidman
Party	Democratic	Republican
Popular vote	1,328,013	1,305,179
Percentage	50.32%	49.46%

The 1962 Michigan Auditor General election was held on November 6, 1962. Incumbent Democrat Billie S. Farnum defeated Republican nominee L. William Seidman who got 50.32% of the vote.

This was the last Michigan Auditor General election, because with the ratification of the 1963 Michigan Constitution, the State Auditor General became an appointed position, rather than an elected one.

== General election ==
=== Candidates ===
Major party candidates

- Billie S. Farnum, Democratic
- L. William Seidman, Republican

Other candidates

- Albert Mills, Socialist Labor

=== Results ===
Michigan Auditor General election, 1962
Party	Candidate	Votes	%
Democratic	Billie S. Farnum (incumbent)	1,328,013	50.32
Republican	L. William Seidman	1,305,179	49.46
Socialist Labor	Albert Mills	5,708	0.22
Write-ins		3	0.00
Total votes		2,638,903	100
Democratic hold			
