= William Isaac =

American banker (1943–2026)

William M. Isaac

Chairman of the Federal Deposit Insurance Corporation
- In office August 3, 1981 – October 21, 1985
- President: Jimmy Carter; Ronald Reagan
- Preceded by: Irvine H. Sprague
- Succeeded by: L. William Seidman

Personal details
- Born: December 21, 1943 Bryan, Ohio, U.S.
- Died: June 19, 2026 (aged 82) Sarasota, Florida, U.S.
- Party: Republican
- Education: Miami, B.A. Ohio State, J.D.
- Website: williamisaac.com

William M. Isaac (December 21, 1943 – June 19, 2026) was an American banker who served as Chairman of the Federal Deposit Insurance Corporation (FDIC) from August 3, 1981, to October 21, 1985. He was appointed to the FDIC Board of Directors by President Jimmy Carter in 1978 at age 34, and in 1981 became the youngest-ever Chairman of the FDIC when President Ronald Reagan appointed him to the position at age 36.

In 1986, Isaac founded the regulatory consulting firm The Secura Group, LLC, which became part of FTI Consulting, Inc., a global consulting firm. Isaac served as Chairman of the Board of Fifth Third Bancorp from 2009 through 2014. He left FTI Consulting at year-end 2019 and joined The Isaac-Milstein Group as Co-Chairman with New York financier and philanthropist Howard Milstein. Milstein is Chairman & CEO of New York Private Bank & Trust, which in turn owns Emigrant Bank.

Isaac sat on a number of corporate boards (including New York Private Bank & Trust and Emigrant Bank) and was Chairman of Sarasota Private Trust and Cleveland Private Trust. He spoke and wrote regularly on financial and regulatory issues.

== Early life and education ==
William M. Isaac was born on December 21, 1943, to parents Charles and Ruth Isaac. He grew up in Bryan, Ohio.

Isaac earned his Bachelor of Business Administration degree from Miami University in Oxford, Ohio, in 1966. While a student at Miami, he was a member of the Phi Gamma Delta fraternity and the Student Senate, and served as Treasurer of his class. He received a Juris Doctor (summa cum laude) from the Moritz College of Law at The Ohio State University in 1969. He also received an honorary degree from Miami University in Oxford, Ohio, in 1984.

== Career ==
After law school, Isaac went to work for the law firm Foley & Lardner in Milwaukee. Witnessing incredible changes rippling through the banking sector at the time, he worked at the forefront of the vast expansion of bank holding companies and addressed the difficulties posed by the recession and real estate collapse of 1972-1974.

Making a move to focus his career on the banking industry, Isaac departed Foley & Lardner in 1974 to join the First Kentucky National Corporation in Louisville, the largest banking company in the state. He served as vice president and general counsel of the corporation and its subsidiaries, which included the First National Bank of Louisville and First Kentucky Trust Co.

There, he got his first taste of dealing with shareholders and reporting to regulatory agencies, including the FDIC, and learned to deftly navigate the economic waters of the mid-1970s.

In 1978, at age 34, Isaac was tapped by President Jimmy Carter to serve as the youngest-ever member of the board of the FDIC. The position proved to be full throttle from day one—in fact, on his first day in office at the FDIC, Isaac was called down to Puerto Rico, where one of the territory's largest banks, Banco Credito, was set to fail. Isaac was named Chairman of the FDIC in 1981 following the election of President Ronald Reagan. He served in that position through 1985 and is credited with preparing the FDIC for an onslaught of bank failures throughout the 1980s and into the 1990s.

The time Isaac served as FDIC Chairman (1981–85) proved a very tumultuous period in U.S. banking, and has served as a point of comparison to the 2008 financial crisis. Isaac was appointed to the three-member board of directors of the FDIC on March 16, 1978, by President Carter. Some of the major challenges during Isaac's tenure at the FDIC were sky-high interest rates (the U.S. prime rate reached 21.5 percent); widespread bank failures and massive insolvencies in the thrift industry; the Garn–St. Germain Depository Institutions Act deregulating interest rates; a major recession in 1981-1982 with unemployment reaching 11 percent in 1983; the collapse of Continental Illinois, then the seventh largest bank in the U.S.; the third-world debt crisis; a depression in the agricultural sector; a collapse of the bubble in the energy sector; and a severe nationwide collapse in the real estate sector. Altogether during the crises of the 1980s and early 1990s, some 3,000 banks and thrifts failed, including many of the largest banks in the country and nine of the 10 largest banks in Texas.

Isaac is widely credited, including by President Reagan and former Fed Chairman Paul Volcker, with helping to maintain stability in the financial system during a period of severe stress. While at the FDIC, Isaac served on the Depository Institutions Deregulation Committee, chaired the Financial Institutions Examination Council, and served on the Vice President's Task Force on Regulation of Financial Services.

After his service at the FDIC, Isaac founded The Secura Group, a consulting firm providing regulatory counseling, risk management services, strategic studies, expert testimony, and management consulting for financial institutions, law firms, and governments. LECG acquired the Secura Group in 2007, at which time Isaac became an integral part of the financial services group at LECG, which was later acquired by FTI Consulting.

He was involved extensively in thought leadership relating to the financial services industry and policy makers worldwide. His articles are published in the Wall Street Journal, Washington Post, New York Times, Forbes, American Banker, and other leading publications. He also appeared regularly on leading television and radio programs in the U.S. and abroad, was a contributor to CNBC, testified before Congress, and was a frequent speaker throughout the world on finance and regulatory matters.

Isaac served as Senior Managing Director for FTI Consulting until the end of 2019. In May 2010, Isaac was elected chairman of Fifth Third Bancorp, and in 2014 was elected to the board of directors of Total System Services, Inc. (TSYS). He was a regular commentator on banking and financial issues for CNBC TV and regularly contributed opinion pieces for American Banker magazine and Forbes. His book Senseless Panic: How Washington Failed America, about the 2008 financial crisis, with foreword by former Federal Reserve Chairman Paul Volcker, was published in June 2010 by Wiley & Sons. Isaac left FTI Consulting and partnered with New York banker and philanthropist Howard Milstein at the end of 2019, serving as Co-Chairman of The Isaac-Milstein Group, a global financial services consulting firm, with Milstein. Isaac served on the boards of New York Private Bank & Trust and Emigrant Bank in New York City, and was Chairman of Sarasota Private Trust and Cleveland Private Trust, both part of the Milstein family of companies.

== Death ==
Isaac died on June 19, 2026, at the age of 82.
