= Jack H. McDonald =

American attorney and politician (1932–2022)

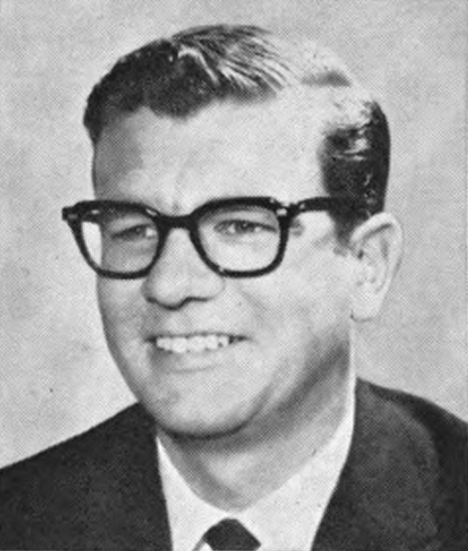

Member of the U.S. House of Representatives from Michigan's 19th district
- In office January 3, 1967 – January 3, 1973
- Preceded by: Billie S. Farnum
- Succeeded by: William Broomfield

Personal details
- Born: June 28, 1932 Detroit, Michigan, U.S.
- Died: August 17, 2022 (aged 90) Stuart, Florida, U.S.
- Party: Republican
- Education: Wayne State University
- Occupation: consultant, lobbyist, politician

Jack Harvey McDonald (June 28, 1932 – August 17, 2022) was an American attorney and politician from Michigan who served three terms in the United States House of Representatives from 1967 to 1973. He was a member of the Republican Party.

== Biography ==
McDonald was born in Detroit and was educated in White Lake Township, Michigan and Detroit. He attended Wayne State University and served as supervisor of census for Wayne County with the Bureau of the Census in 1960. He was elected supervisor of Redford, Michigan in 1961 and 1963, reelected in 1964. He was elected chairman of the Wayne County Board of Supervisors in 1965. He was appointed to Republican Task Force on Urban Affairs in 1967.

=== Congress ===
In 1966, he was the Republican Party candidate in Michigan's 19th congressional district. He defeated incumbent Democratic Party Billie S. Farnum, one of the "Five Fluke Freshmen", to be elected to the 90th United States Congress and to the two succeeding Congresses, serving from January 3, 1967, to January 3, 1973. In 1972, after redistricting, he ran in the same district as veteran Republican Representative William Broomfield. McDonald lost to Broomfield in the Republican primary elections.

=== Later career and death ===
After leaving Congress, he became a consultant and lobbyist with law firm Verner, Liipfert, Bernhard, McPherson and Hand. He was a resident of Outer Banks.

He died from complications of colon cancer on August 17, 2022, in Stuart, Florida, at the age of 90.

U.S. House of Representatives
Preceded by Billie S. Farnum	United States Representative for the 19th congressional district of Michigan; 1967 – 1973	Succeeded by William Broomfield
