= Bill Goodling =

American politician (1927–2017)

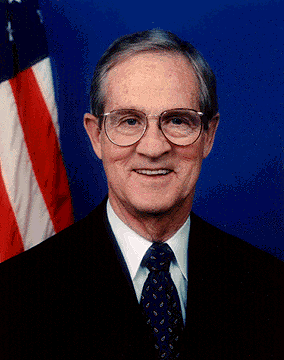

Member of the U.S. House of Representatives from Pennsylvania's 19th district
- In office January 3, 1975 – January 3, 2001
- Preceded by: George Goodling
- Succeeded by: Todd Platts

Personal details
- Born: William Franklin Goodling; December 5, 1927 Loganville, Pennsylvania, U.S.
- Died: September 17, 2017 (aged 89) York, Pennsylvania, U.S.
- Party: Republican
- Spouse: Hilda Goodling (died 2008)
- Relations: George Atlee Goodling (father)
- Education: University of Maryland, College Park (BS); Western Maryland College (MEd); Pennsylvania State University, University Park

William Franklin Goodling (December 5, 1927 – September 17, 2017) was a Republican member of the U.S. House of Representatives from Pennsylvania. At the time of his death, he was the chairman of the board of the Goodling Institute for Research in Family Literacy.

== Biography ==
Goodling, the son of former Congressman George Atlee Goodling, was born in Loganville, Pennsylvania, and grew up in York, Pennsylvania. He received a B.S. from the University of Maryland in 1953, a Masters in Education from Western Maryland College in 1957, and undertook doctoral studies at the Pennsylvania State University, from 1958 to 1963. He held various teaching and administrative positions throughout the State of Pennsylvania. Goodling served in the United States Army from 1946 to 1948. He served on the Dallastown area school board and was president of the school board. Goodling died on September 17, 2017.

== Political career ==
Goodling was elected to Congress as a Republican in 1974. He was implicated in the House banking scandal in 1992. After his party took over a majority in the House in January 1995, he served as Chairman of the United States House Committee on Education and Labor (then called the Committee on Economic and Educational Opportunities or the Committee on Education and the Workforce). He retired from public service in 2001.

U.S. House of Representatives
Preceded by George Goodling	Member of the U.S. House of Representatives from Pennsylvania's 19th congressional district 1975–2001	Succeeded by Todd Platts
Political offices
Preceded by Jim Jeffords; Vermont	Ranking Member of the House Education and Labor Committee; 1989–1995	Succeeded by Bill Clay; Missouri
Preceded by William D. Ford; Michigan	Chairman of the House Education and the Workforce Committee; 1995–2001	Succeeded by John Boehner; Ohio
