= George A. Goodling =

American politician

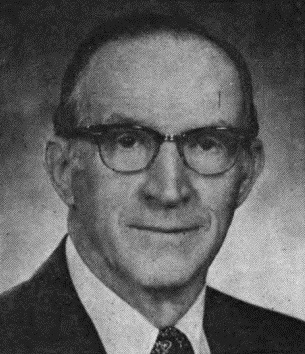

Member of the U.S. House of Representatives from Pennsylvania's 19th district
- In office January 3, 1967 – January 3, 1975
- Preceded by: Nathaniel N. Craley, Jr.
- Succeeded by: Bill Goodling
- In office January 3, 1961 – January 3, 1965
- Preceded by: James M. Quigley
- Succeeded by: Nathaniel N. Craley, Jr.

Member of the Pennsylvania House of Representatives
- In office 1943–1957

Personal details
- Born: September 26, 1896 Loganville, Pennsylvania, U.S.
- Died: October 17, 1982 (aged 86) York, Pennsylvania, U.S.
- Party: Republican
- Education: Pennsylvania State University

George Atlee Goodling (September 26, 1896 – October 17, 1982) was a Republican member of the U.S. House of Representatives from Pennsylvania.

== Biography ==
George Atlee Goodling was born in Loganville, Pennsylvania. During the First World War he served as a seaman, second class in the United States Navy from March 1918 to December 1918. He received a B.S. from the Pennsylvania State University in 1921.

After graduation he was the operator of a fruit farm near Loganville, the director of a bank, motor club, and insurance company. Goodling served on the local school board. He served in the Pennsylvania House of Representatives from 1943 to 1957.

He was elected to Congress as a Republican in 1960, defeating incumbent Democratic Congressman James M. Quigley and served two terms. He was an unsuccessful candidate for reelection in 1964 but was elected in 1966 for the first of four more terms ending in 1975 when he was succeeded by his son William F. Goodling.

U.S. House of Representatives
Preceded by James M. Quigley; Nathaniel N. Craley, Jr.	Member of the U.S. House of Representatives from Pennsylvania's 19th congressional district 1961–1965; 1967–1975	Succeeded by Nathaniel N. Craley, Jr. Bill Goodling
