= Billie S. Farnum =

American politician (1916–1979)

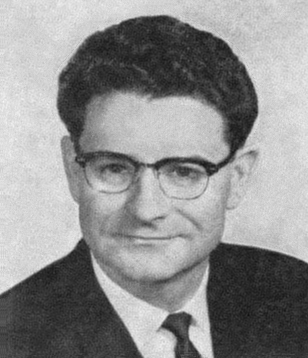

Member of the U.S. House of Representatives from Michigan's 19th district
- In office January 3, 1965 – January 3, 1967
- Preceded by: Neil Staebler (redistricting)
- Succeeded by: Jack H. McDonald

Michigan Auditor General
- In office 1961–1964
- Preceded by: William A. Burgett
- Succeeded by: Allison Green

Personal details
- Born: Billie Sunday Farnum; April 11, 1916 Saginaw, Michigan
- Died: November 18, 1979 (aged 63) Lansing, Michigan
- Resting place: Deepdale Memorial Park, Eaton County, Michigan
- Party: Democratic
- Spouse: Maxine Farnum
- Children: Norman Farnum, Ron Farnum, Gene Farnum

Billie Sunday Farnum (April 11, 1916 – November 18, 1979) was a politician from the U.S. state of Michigan. He served one term in the U.S. House of Representatives from 1965 to 1967.

== Biography ==
Farnum was born in Saginaw, Michigan and raised in a farm community at Watrousville. He was named after evangelist Billy Sunday.

He graduated from Vassar High School, Vassar, Michigan, in 1933 and continued his education in the Civilian Conservation Corps, 1933–1935. He took special educational courses and was employed in the automobile industry in Pontiac, 1936–1952.

He engaged in union activities ranging from shop steward to international representative for United Auto Workers-Congress of Industrial Organizations from 1942 to 1952. He was administrative aide to U.S. Senator Blair Moody, 1952–1954 and assistant Michigan Secretary of State, 1955–1957; deputy Michigan Secretary of State, 1957–1960; and Michigan Auditor General, 1961–1965. He was a delegate to the Democratic National Conventions of 1956, 1960, and 1964.

=== Congress ===
Farnum was elected as a Democrat from Michigan's 19th congressional district to the 88th United States Congress, serving from January 3, 1965, to January 3, 1967. He was an unsuccessful candidate for reelection in 1966, losing in the general election to Republican Jack McDonald. As a result, he was described as one of the Michigan Five Fluke Freshmen, a group of first term Michigan Democrats in Congress who were defeated in 1966.

=== Later career and death ===
Farnum was a deputy chairman of the Democratic National Committee from 1967 to 1968 and a member of the Waterford Board of Education from 1969 to 1970. He owned a financial and management consulting firm. He was elected secretary of the Michigan Senate in 1975 and served in that capacity until his death in Lansing. He was entombed in a mausoleum at Deepdale Memorial Park.

=== Legacy ===
The Michigan Senate's previous office building in Lansing was named after Farnum. In 2016, the Michigan Senate's office building was moved to the Connie Binsfield Building.

Party political offices
Preceded by Otis M. Smith	Democratic nominee for Michigan Auditor General; 1962	Succeeded by None
U.S. House of Representatives
Preceded by None	United States Representative for the 19th congressional district of Michigan; 1965 – 1967	Succeeded by Jack H. McDonald
