= List of United States representatives in the 89th Congress =

This is a complete list of United States representatives during the 89th United States Congress listed by seniority.

As an historical article, the districts and party affiliations listed reflect those during the 89th Congress (January 3, 1965 – January 3, 1967). Seats and party affiliations on similar lists for other congresses will be different for certain members.

Seniority depends on the date on which members were sworn into office. Since many members are sworn in on the same day, subsequent ranking is based on previous congressional service of the individual and then by alphabetical order by the last name of the representative.

Committee chairmanship in the House is often associated with seniority. However, party leadership is typically not associated with seniority.

Note: The "*" indicates that the representative/delegate may have served one or more non-consecutive terms while in the House of Representatives of the United States Congress.

== U.S. House seniority list ==
U.S. House seniority
Rank	Representative	Party	District	Seniority date (Previous service, if any)	No.# of term(s)	Notes
1	Emanuel Celler	D	NY-10	March 4, 1923	22nd term	Dean of the House
2	Joseph William Martin Jr.	R	MA-10	March 4, 1925	21st term	Left the House in 1967.
3	John William McCormack	D	MA-09	November 6, 1928	20th term	Speaker of the House
4	Wright Patman	D	TX-01	March 4, 1929	19th term	
5	Howard W. Smith	D	VA-08	March 4, 1931	18th term	Left the House in 1967.
6	William M. Colmer	D	MS-05	March 4, 1933	17th term	
7	Harold D. Cooley	D	NC-04	July 7, 1934	17th term	Resigned on December 30, 1966.
8	Leslie C. Arends	R	IL-17	January 3, 1935	16th term	
9	George H. Mahon	D	TX-19	January 3, 1935	16th term	
10	Charles A. Halleck	R	IN-02	January 29, 1935	16th term	
11	Eugene James Keogh	D	NY-11	January 3, 1937	15th term	Left the House in 1967.
12	Michael J. Kirwan	D	OH-19	January 3, 1937	15th term	
13	William R. Poage	D	TX-11	January 3, 1937	15th term	
14	Albert Thomas	D	TX-08	January 3, 1937	15th term	Died on February 15, 1966.
15	Clarence J. Brown	R	OH-07	January 3, 1939	14th term	Died on August 23, 1965.
16	Ezekiel C. Gathings	D	AR-01	January 3, 1939	14th term	
17	John L. McMillan	D	SC-06	January 3, 1939	14th term	
18	Wilbur Mills	D	AR-02	January 3, 1939	14th term	
19	Frances P. Bolton	R	OH-22	February 27, 1940	14th term	
20	Herbert Covington Bonner	D	NC-01	November 5, 1940	14th term	Died on November 7, 1965.
21	Felix Edward Hébert	D	LA-01	January 3, 1941	13th term	
22	Oren Harris	D	AR-04	January 3, 1941	13th term	Resigned on February 3, 1966.
23	L. Mendel Rivers	D	SC-01	January 3, 1941	13th term	
24	Jamie Whitten	D	MS-02	November 4, 1941	13th term	
25	Cecil R. King	D	CA-17	August 25, 1942	13th term	
26	Thomas Abernethy	D	MS-01	January 3, 1943	12th term	
27	William L. Dawson	D	IL-01	January 3, 1943	12th term	
28	Michael A. Feighan	D	OH-20	January 3, 1943	12th term	
29	O. C. Fisher	D	TX-21	January 3, 1943	12th term	
30	Chester E. Holifield	D	CA-19	January 3, 1943	12th term	
31	Alvin O'Konski	R	WI-10	January 3, 1943	12th term	
32	Ray Madden	D	IN-01	January 3, 1943	12th term	
33	James H. Morrison	D	LA-06	January 3, 1943	12th term	Left the House in 1967.
34	Tom J. Murray	D	TN-07	January 3, 1943	12th term	Resigned on December 30, 1966.
35	Philip J. Philbin	D	MA-03	January 3, 1943	12th term	
36	George W. Andrews	D	AL-03	March 14, 1944	12th term	
37	John J. Rooney	D	NY-14	June 6, 1944	12th term	
38	John W. Byrnes	R	WI-08	January 3, 1945	11th term	
39	Frank Chelf	D	KY-04	January 3, 1945	11th term	Left the House in 1967.
40	Robert J. Corbett	R	PA-18	January 3, 1945; Previous service, 1939–1941.	12th term*	
41	George Hyde Fallon	D	MD-04	January 3, 1945	11th term	
42	James G. Fulton	R	PA-27	January 3, 1945	11th term	
43	George Paul Miller	D	CA-08	January 3, 1945	11th term	
44	Thomas E. Morgan	D	PA-26	January 3, 1945	11th term	
45	Adam Clayton Powell Jr.	D	NY-18	January 3, 1945	11th term	
46	Charles Melvin Price	D	IL-24	January 3, 1945	11th term	
47	Robert L. F. Sikes	D	FL-01	January 3, 1945; Previous service, 1941–1944.	13th term*	
48	James William Trimble	D	AR-03	January 3, 1945	11th term	Left the House in 1967.
49	John E. Fogarty	D	RI-02	February 7, 1945; Previous service, 1941–1944	13th term*	
50	Olin E. Teague	D	TX-06	August 24, 1946	11th term	
51	Carl Albert	D	OK-03	January 3, 1947	10th term	
52	John Blatnik	D	MN-08	January 3, 1947	10th term	
53	Hale Boggs	D	LA-02	January 3, 1947; Previous service, 1941–1943.	11th term*	
54	Omar Burleson	D	TX-17	January 3, 1947	10th term	
55	Paul B. Dague	R	PA-09	January 3, 1947	10th term	Resigned on December 30, 1966.
56	Harold Donohue	D	MA-04	January 3, 1947	10th term	
57	Joe L. Evins	D	TN-04	January 3, 1947	10th term	
58	Porter Hardy Jr.	D	VA-02	January 3, 1947	10th term	
59	Frank M. Karsten	D	MO-01	January 3, 1947	10th term	
60	Otto Passman	D	LA-05	January 3, 1947	10th term	
61	John Bell Williams	D	MS-03	January 3, 1947	10th term	
62	Robert E. Jones Jr.	D	AL-08	January 28, 1947	10th term	
63	Edward Garmatz	D	MD-03	July 15, 1947	10th term	
64	Clark W. Thompson	D	TX-09	August 23, 1947; Previous service, 1933–1935.	11th term*	Resigned on December 30, 1966.
65	William Moore McCulloch	R	OH-04	November 4, 1947	10th term	
66	Abraham J. Multer	D	NY-13	November 4, 1947	10th term	
67	Watkins Moorman Abbitt	D	VA-04	February 17, 1948	10th term	
68	Paul C. Jones	D	MO-10	November 2, 1948	10th term	
69	Wayne N. Aspinall	D	CO-04	January 3, 1949	9th term	
70	William A. Barrett	D	PA-01	January 3, 1949; Previous service, 1945–1947.	10th term*	
71	Charles Edward Bennett	D	FL-02	January 3, 1949	9th term	
72	Richard Walker Bolling	D	MO-05	January 3, 1949	9th term	
73	James J. Delaney	D	NY-09	January 3, 1949; Previous service, 1945–1947.	10th term*	
74	Gerald Ford	R	MI-05	January 3, 1949	9th term	
75	H. R. Gross	R	IA-03	January 3, 1949	9th term	
76	Wayne Hays	D	OH-18	January 3, 1949	9th term	
77	Albert S. Herlong Jr.	D	FL-05	January 3, 1949	9th term	
78	Carl D. Perkins	D	KY-07	January 3, 1949	9th term	
79	George M. Rhodes	D	PA-06	January 3, 1949	9th term	
80	Peter W. Rodino	D	NJ-10	January 3, 1949	9th term	
81	Harley Orrin Staggers	D	WV-02	January 3, 1949	9th term	
82	Tom Steed	D	OK-04	January 3, 1949	9th term	
83	Edwin E. Willis	D	LA-03	January 3, 1949	9th term	
84	Clement J. Zablocki	D	WI-04	January 3, 1949	9th term	
85	John P. Saylor	R	PA-22	September 13, 1949	9th term	
86	Edna F. Kelly	D	NY-12	November 8, 1949	9th term	
87	William B. Widnall	R	NJ-07	February 6, 1950	9th term	
88	William H. Bates	R	MA-06	February 14, 1950	9th term	
89	E. Ross Adair	R	IN-04	January 3, 1951	8th term	
90	William Hanes Ayres	R	OH-14	January 3, 1951	8th term	
91	Page Belcher	R	OK-01	January 3, 1951	8th term	
92	Jackson Edward Betts	R	OH-08	January 3, 1951	8th term	
93	Ellis Yarnal Berry	R	SD-02	January 3, 1951	8th term	
94	Frank T. Bow	R	OH-16	January 3, 1951	8th term	
95	William G. Bray	R	IN-07	January 3, 1951	8th term	
96	Thomas B. Curtis	R	MO-02	January 3, 1951	8th term	
97	William Jennings Bryan Dorn	D	SC-03	January 3, 1951; Previous service, 1947–1949.	9th term*	
98	John Jarman	D	OK-05	January 3, 1951	8th term	
99	John C. Kluczynski	D	IL-05	January 3, 1951	8th term	
100	Byron G. Rogers	D	CO-01	January 3, 1951	8th term	
101	Walter E. Rogers	D	TX-18	January 3, 1951	8th term	Left the House in 1967.
102	William L. Springer	R	IL-22	January 3, 1951	8th term	
103	John C. Watts	D	KY-06	April 4, 1951	8th term	
104	Leo W. O'Brien	D	NY-29	April 1, 1952	8th term	Resigned on December 30, 1966.
105	John Dowdy	D	TX-07	September 23, 1952	8th term	
106	Edward Boland	D	MA-02	January 3, 1953	7th term	
107	Jack Brooks	D	TX-02	January 3, 1953	7th term	
108	Joel Broyhill	R	VA-10	January 3, 1953	7th term	
109	James A. Byrne	D	PA-03	January 3, 1953	7th term	
110	Elford Albin Cederberg	R	MI-10	January 3, 1953	7th term	
111	Ed Edmondson	D	OK-02	January 3, 1953	7th term	
112	Paul A. Fino	R	NY-24	January 3, 1953	7th term	
113	Lawrence H. Fountain	D	NC-02	January 3, 1953	7th term	
114	Peter Frelinghuysen Jr.	R	NJ-05	January 3, 1953	7th term	
115	Samuel Friedel	D	MD-07	January 3, 1953	7th term	
116	Charles S. Gubser	R	CA-10	January 3, 1953	7th term	
117	Harlan Hagen	D	CA-18	January 3, 1953	7th term	
118	James A. Haley	D	FL-07	January 3, 1953	7th term	
119	Craig Hosmer	R	CA-32	January 3, 1953	7th term	
120	Charles R. Jonas	R	NC-08	January 3, 1953	7th term	
121	Melvin Laird	R	WI-07	January 3, 1953	7th term	
122	Phillip M. Landrum	D	GA-09	January 3, 1953	7th term	
123	William S. Mailliard	R	CA-06	January 3, 1953	7th term	
124	Donald Ray Matthews	D	FL-08	January 3, 1953	7th term	Left the House in 1967.
125	John E. Moss	D	CA-03	January 3, 1953	7th term	
126	Barratt O'Hara	D	IL-02	January 3, 1953; Previous service, 1949–1951.	8th term*	
127	Tip O'Neill	D	MA-08	January 3, 1953	7th term	
128	Thomas Pelly	R	WA-01	January 3, 1953	7th term	
129	Richard Harding Poff	R	VA-06	January 3, 1953	7th term	
130	John J. Rhodes	R	AZ-01	January 3, 1953	7th term	
131	Armistead I. Selden Jr.	D	AL-05	January 3, 1953	7th term	
132	Leonor Sullivan	D	MO-03	January 3, 1953	7th term	
133	T. Ashton Thompson	D	LA-07	January 3, 1953	7th term	Died on July 1, 1965.
134	James B. Utt	R	CA-35	January 3, 1953	7th term	
135	Bob Wilson	R	CA-36	January 3, 1953	7th term	
136	J. Arthur Younger	R	CA-11	January 3, 1953	7th term	
137	William M. Tuck	D	VA-05	April 14, 1953	7th term	
138	Robert T. Ashmore	D	SC-04	June 2, 1953	7th term	
139	William Natcher	D	KY-02	August 1, 1953	7th term	
140	Glenard P. Lipscomb	R	CA-24	November 10, 1953	7th term	
141	John James Flynt Jr.	D	GA-06	November 2, 1954	7th term	
142	Thomas W. L. Ashley	D	OH-09	January 3, 1955	6th term	
143	John F. Baldwin Jr.	R	CA-14	January 3, 1955	6th term	Died on March 9, 1966.
144	Frank M. Clark	D	PA-25	January 3, 1955	6th term	
145	William C. Cramer	R	FL-12	January 3, 1955	6th term	
146	Winfield K. Denton	D	IN-08	January 3, 1955; Previous service, 1949–1953.	8th term*	Resigned on December 30, 1966.
147	Charles Diggs	D	MI-13	January 3, 1955	6th term	
148	Dante Fascell	D	FL-04	January 3, 1955	6th term	
149	Daniel J. Flood	D	PA-11	January 3, 1955; Previous service, 1945–1947 and 1949–1953.	9th term**	
150	Kenneth J. Gray	D	IL-21	January 3, 1955	6th term	
151	Edith Green	D	OR-03	January 3, 1955	6th term	
152	Martha Griffiths	D	MI-17	January 3, 1955	6th term	
153	William Raleigh Hull Jr.	D	MO-06	January 3, 1955	6th term	
154	W. Pat Jennings	D	VA-09	January 3, 1955	6th term	Left the House in 1967.
155	Torbert Macdonald	D	MA-07	January 3, 1955	6th term	
156	William Edwin Minshall Jr.	R	OH-23	January 3, 1955	6th term	
157	Henry S. Reuss	D	WI-05	January 3, 1955	6th term	
158	James Roosevelt	D	CA-26	January 3, 1955	6th term	Resigned on September 30, 1965.
159	Bernice F. Sisk	D	CA-16	January 3, 1955	6th term	
160	Charles M. Teague	R	CA-13	January 3, 1955	6th term	
161	Frank Thompson	D	NJ-04	January 3, 1955	6th term	
162	Charles Vanik	D	OH-21	January 3, 1955	6th term	
163	Jim Wright	D	TX-12	January 3, 1955	6th term	
164	Paul Rogers	D	FL-06	January 11, 1955	6th term	
165	John Dingell	D	MI-16	December 13, 1955	6th term	
166	Elmer J. Holland	D	PA-20	January 24, 1956; Previous service, 1942–1943.	7th term*	
167	Walter S. Baring Jr.	D	NV	January 3, 1957; Previous service, 1949–1953.	7th term*	
168	Lindley Beckworth	D	TX-03	January 3, 1957; Previous service, 1939–1953.	12th term*	Left the House in 1967.
169	William Broomfield	R	MI-18	January 3, 1957	5th term	
170	Charles E. Chamberlain	R	MI-06	January 3, 1957	5th term	
171	Harold R. Collier	R	IL-10	January 3, 1957	5th term	
172	Glenn Cunningham	R	NE-02	January 3, 1957	5th term	
173	Willard S. Curtin	R	PA-08	January 3, 1957	5th term	Left the House in 1967.
174	Florence P. Dwyer	R	NJ-06	January 3, 1957	5th term	
175	Leonard Farbstein	D	NY-19	January 3, 1957	5th term	
176	Robert P. Griffin	R	MI-09	January 3, 1957	5th term	Resigned on May 10, 1966.
177	Alton Lennon	D	NC-07	January 3, 1957	5th term	
178	John J. McFall	D	CA-15	January 3, 1957	5th term	
179	Robert Michel	R	IL-18	January 3, 1957	5th term	
180	Arch A. Moore Jr.	R	WV-01	January 3, 1957	5th term	
181	Ralph James Scott	D	NC-05	January 3, 1957	5th term	Left the House in 1967.
182	H. Allen Smith	R	CA-20	January 3, 1957	5th term	
183	Al Ullman	D	OR-02	January 3, 1957	5th term	
184	John Andrew Young	D	TX-14	January 3, 1957	5th term	
185	Basil Lee Whitener	D	NC-10	January 3, 1957	5th term	
186	Howard W. Robison	R	NY-33	January 14, 1958	5th term	
187	John Herman Dent	D	PA-21	January 21, 1958	5th term	
188	Fats Everett	D	TN-08	February 1, 1958	5th term	
189	Al Quie	R	MN-01	February 18, 1958	5th term	
190	Robert N.C. Nix Sr.	D	PA-02	May 20, 1958	5th term	
191	James A. Burke	D	MA-11	January 3, 1959	4th term	
192	John Brademas	D	IN-03	January 3, 1959	4th term	
193	William T. Cahill	R	NJ-01	January 3, 1959	4th term	
194	Robert R. Casey	D	TX-22	January 3, 1959	4th term	
195	Jeffery Cohelan	D	CA-07	January 3, 1959	4th term	
196	Silvio O. Conte	R	MA-01	January 3, 1959	4th term	
197	Emilio Q. Daddario	D	CT-01	January 3, 1959	4th term	
198	Dominick V. Daniels	D	NJ-14	January 3, 1959	4th term	
199	Ed Derwinski	R	IL-04	January 3, 1959	4th term	
200	Samuel L. Devine	R	OH-12	January 3, 1959	4th term	
201	Thomas N. Downing	D	VA-01	January 3, 1959	4th term	
202	Thaddeus J. Dulski	D	NY-41	January 3, 1959	4th term	
203	Cornelius Edward Gallagher	D	NJ-13	January 3, 1959	4th term	
204	Robert Giaimo	D	CT-03	January 3, 1959	4th term	
205	Seymour Halpern	R	NY-06	January 3, 1959	4th term	
206	Ken Hechler	D	WV-04	January 3, 1959	4th term	
207	Harold T. Johnson	D	CA-02	January 3, 1959	4th term	
208	Joseph Karth	D	MN-04	January 3, 1959	4th term	
209	Robert Kastenmeier	D	WI-02	January 3, 1959	4th term	
210	Hastings Keith	R	MA-12	January 3, 1959	4th term	
211	Odin Langen	R	MN-07	January 3, 1959	4th term	
212	Del Latta	R	OH-05	January 3, 1959	4th term	
213	John Lindsay	R	NY-17	January 3, 1959	4th term	Resigned on December 31, 1965.
214	Catherine Dean May	R	WA-04	January 3, 1959	4th term	
215	Harris B. McDowell Jr.	D	DE	January 3, 1959; Previous service, 1955–1957.	5th term*	Left the House in 1967.
216	William S. Moorhead	D	PA-14	January 3, 1959	4th term	
217	John S. Monagan	D	CT-05	January 3, 1959	4th term	
218	Thomas G. Morris	D	NM	January 3, 1959	4th term	
219	William T. Murphy	D	IL-03	January 3, 1959	4th term	
220	Ancher Nelsen	R	MN-02	January 3, 1959	4th term	
221	James G. O'Hara	D	MI-12	January 3, 1959	4th term	
222	Alexander Pirnie	R	NY-32	January 3, 1959	4th term	
223	Roman C. Pucinski	D	IL-11	January 3, 1959	4th term	
224	Ralph Julian Rivers	D	AK	January 3, 1959	4th term	Resigned on December 30, 1966.
225	Dan Rostenkowski	D	IL-08	January 3, 1959	4th term	
226	J. Edward Roush	D	IN-05	January 3, 1959	4th term	
227	George E. Shipley	D	IL-23	January 3, 1959	4th term	
228	John M. Slack Jr.	D	WV-03	January 3, 1959	4th term	
229	Neal Smith	D	IA-05	January 3, 1959	4th term	
230	Samuel S. Stratton	D	NY-35	January 3, 1959	4th term	
231	Frank Stubblefield	D	KY-01	January 3, 1959	4th term	
232	Herman Toll	D	PA-04	January 3, 1959	4th term	Left the House in 1967.
233	William J. Randall	D	MO-04	March 3, 1959	4th term	
234	Charles Goodell	R	NY-38	May 26, 1959	4th term	
235	Jacob H. Gilbert	D	NY-22	March 8, 1960	4th term	
236	Herman T. Schneebeli	R	PA-17	April 26, 1960	4th term	
237	Roy A. Taylor	D	NC-11	June 25, 1960	4th term	
238	Julia Butler Hansen	D	WA-03	November 8, 1960	4th term	
239	J. Irving Whalley	R	PA-12	November 8, 1960	4th term	
240	Joseph Patrick Addabbo	D	NY-07	January 3, 1961	3rd term	
241	John B. Anderson	R	IL-16	January 3, 1961	3rd term	
242	John M. Ashbrook	R	OH-17	January 3, 1961	3rd term	
243	James F. Battin	R	MT-02	January 3, 1961	3rd term	
244	Alphonzo E. Bell Jr.	R	CA-28	January 3, 1961	3rd term	
245	Hugh Carey	D	NY-15	January 3, 1961	3rd term	
246	Donald D. Clancy	R	OH-02	January 3, 1961	3rd term	
247	James C. Corman	D	CA-22	January 3, 1961	3rd term	
248	John W. Davis	D	GA-07	January 3, 1961	3rd term	
249	Bob Dole	R	KS-01	January 3, 1961	3rd term	
250	Paul Findley	R	IL-20	January 3, 1961	3rd term	
251	Fernand St. Germain	D	RI-01	January 3, 1961	3rd term	
252	George Elliott Hagan	D	GA-01	January 3, 1961	3rd term	
253	Durward Gorham Hall	R	MO-07	January 3, 1961	3rd term	
254	Bill Harsha	R	OH-06	January 3, 1961	3rd term	
255	R. James Harvey	R	MI-08	January 3, 1961	3rd term	
256	Ralph Harvey	R	IN-10	January 3, 1961; Previous service, 1947–1959.	9th term*	Resigned on December 30, 1966.
257	David N. Henderson	D	NC-03	January 3, 1961	3rd term	
258	Richard Howard Ichord Jr.	D	MO-08	January 3, 1961	3rd term	
259	Charles Samuel Joelson	D	NJ-08	January 3, 1961	3rd term	
260	Carleton J. King	R	NY-30	January 3, 1961	3rd term	
261	Horace R. Kornegay	D	NC-06	January 3, 1961	3rd term	
262	Clark MacGregor	R	MN-03	January 3, 1961	3rd term	
263	David Martin	R	NE-03	January 3, 1961	3rd term	
264	Charles Mathias	D	MD-06	January 3, 1961	3rd term	
265	F. Bradford Morse	R	MA-05	January 3, 1961	3rd term	
266	Charles Adams Mosher	R	OH-13	January 3, 1961	3rd term	
267	Arnold Olsen	D	MT-01	January 3, 1961	3rd term	
268	Otis G. Pike	D	NY-01	January 3, 1961	3rd term	
269	Ben Reifel	R	SD-01	January 3, 1961	3rd term	
270	William Fitts Ryan	D	NY-20	January 3, 1961	3rd term	
271	Richard L. Roudebush	R	IN-06	January 3, 1961	3rd term	
272	Richard Schweiker	R	PA-13	January 3, 1961	3rd term	
273	Garner E. Shriver	R	KS-04	January 3, 1961	3rd term	
274	Robert Stafford	R	VT	January 3, 1961	3rd term	
275	Robert Grier Stephens Jr.	D	GA-10	January 3, 1961	3rd term	
276	Vernon Wallace Thomson	R	WI-03	January 3, 1961	3rd term	
277	Stanley R. Tupper	R	ME-01	January 3, 1961	3rd term	Left the House in 1967.
278	Mo Udall	D	AZ-02	May 2, 1961	3rd term	
279	John C. Kunkel	R	PA-16	May 16, 1961; Previous service, 1939–1951.	9th term*	Resigned on December 30, 1966.
280	Henry B. González	D	TX-20	November 4, 1961	3rd term	
281	Lucien N. Nedzi	D	MI-14	November 7, 1961	3rd term	
282	Joe Waggonner	D	LA-04	December 19, 1961	3rd term	
283	Graham B. Purcell Jr.	D	TX-13	January 27, 1962	3rd term	
284	Ray Roberts	D	TX-04	January 30, 1962	3rd term	
285	Benjamin S. Rosenthal	D	NY-08	February 20, 1962	3rd term	
286	Bill Brock	R	TN-03	January 3, 1963	2nd term	
287	George Brown Jr.	D	CA-29	January 3, 1963	2nd term	
288	Jim Broyhill	R	NC-09	January 3, 1963	2nd term	
289	Laurence J. Burton	R	UT-01	January 3, 1963	2nd term	
290	Ronald B. Cameron	D	CA-25	January 3, 1963	2nd term	Left the House in 1967.
291	James Colgate Cleveland	R	NH-02	January 3, 1963	2nd term	
292	Lionel Van Deerlin	D	CA-37	January 3, 1963	2nd term	
293	Robert B. Duncan	D	OR-04	January 3, 1963	2nd term	Left the House in 1967.
294	Don Edwards	D	CA-09	January 3, 1963	2nd term	
295	Robert Ellsworth	R	KS-03	January 3, 1963	2nd term	Left the House in 1967.
296	Donald M. Fraser	D	MN-05	January 3, 1963	2nd term	
297	Richard Fulton	D	TN-05	January 3, 1963	2nd term	
298	Don Fuqua	D	FL-09	January 3, 1963	2nd term	
299	Sam Gibbons	D	FL-10	January 3, 1963	2nd term	
300	Bernard F. Grabowski	D	CT-06	January 3, 1963	2nd term	Left the House in 1967.
301	James R. Grover	R	NY-02	January 3, 1963	2nd term	
302	Edward Gurney	R	FL-11	January 3, 1963	2nd term	
303	Richard T. Hanna	D	CA-34	January 3, 1963	2nd term	
304	Augustus F. Hawkins	D	CA-21	January 3, 1963	2nd term	
305	Frank Horton	R	NY-36	January 3, 1963	2nd term	
306	J. Edward Hutchinson	R	MI-04	January 3, 1963	2nd term	
307	Robert L. Leggett	D	CA-04	January 3, 1963	2nd term	
308	Clarence Long	D	MD-02	January 3, 1963	2nd term	
309	John Otho Marsh Jr.	D	VA-07	January 3, 1963	2nd term	
310	Spark Matsunaga	D	HI	January 3, 1963	2nd term	
311	Robert McClory	R	IL-12	January 3, 1963	2nd term	
312	Joseph McDade	R	PA-10	January 3, 1963	2nd term	
313	Joseph Minish	D	NJ-11	January 3, 1963	2nd term	
314	Rogers Morton	R	MD-01	January 3, 1963	2nd term	
315	John M. Murphy	D	NY-16	January 3, 1963	2nd term	
316	Alec G. Olson	D	MN-06	January 3, 1963	2nd term	Left the House in 1967.
317	William St. Onge	D	CT-02	January 3, 1963	2nd term	
318	Edward J. Patten	D	NJ-15	January 3, 1963	2nd term	
319	Claude Pepper	D	FL-03	January 3, 1963	2nd term	
320	Joe R. Pool	D	TX	January 3, 1963	2nd term	
321	Jimmy Quillen	R	TN-01	January 3, 1963	2nd term	
322	Charlotte Thompson Reid	R	IL-15	January 3, 1963	2nd term	
323	Ogden Reid	R	NY-26	January 3, 1963	2nd term	
324	Edward R. Roybal	D	CA-30	January 3, 1963	2nd term	
325	Donald Rumsfeld	R	IL-13	January 3, 1963	2nd term	
326	Robert T. Secrest	D	OH-15	January 3, 1963; Previous service, 1933–1942 and 1949–1954.	10th term**	Resigned on December 30, 1966.
327	George F. Senner Jr.	D	AZ-03	January 3, 1963	2nd term	Left the House in 1967.
328	Carlton R. Sickles	D	MD	January 3, 1963	2nd term	Left the House in 1967.
329	Joe Skubitz	R	KS-05	January 3, 1963	2nd term	
330	Burt L. Talcott	R	CA-12	January 3, 1963	2nd term	
331	J. Russell Tuten	D	GA-08	January 3, 1963	2nd term	Left the House in 1967.
332	Albert Watson	D	SC-02	January 3, 1963	2nd term	Resigned on February 1, 1965.
333	Charles L. Weltner	D	GA-05	January 3, 1963	2nd term	Left the House in 1967.
334	Compton I. White Jr.	D	ID-01	January 3, 1963	2nd term	Left the House in 1967.
335	Charles H. Wilson	D	CA-31	January 3, 1963	2nd term	
336	John W. Wydler	R	NY-04	January 3, 1963	2nd term	
337	Don H. Clausen	R	CA-01	January 22, 1963	2nd term	
338	Del M. Clawson	R	CA-23	June 11, 1963	2nd term	
339	Fred B. Rooney	D	PA-15	July 30, 1963	2nd term	
340	Mark Andrews	R	ND-01	October 22, 1963	2nd term	
341	Albert W. Johnson	R	PA-23	November 5, 1963	2nd term	
342	J. J. Pickle	D	TX-10	December 21, 1963	2nd term	
343	Phillip Burton	D	CA-05	February 18, 1964	2nd term	
344	William J. Green, III	D	PA-05	April 28, 1964	2nd term	
345	Thomas S. Gettys	D	SC-05	November 3, 1964	2nd term	
346	William L. Hungate	D	MO-09	November 3, 1964	2nd term	
347	Wendell Wyatt	R	OR-01	November 3, 1964	2nd term	
348	Brock Adams	D	WA-07	January 3, 1965	1st term	
349	William Anderson	D	TN-06	January 3, 1965	1st term	
350	Glenn Andrews	R	AL-04	January 3, 1965	1st term	Left the House in 1967.
351	Frank Annunzio	D	IL-07	January 3, 1965	1st term	
352	Bert Bandstra	D	IA-04	January 3, 1965	1st term	Left the House in 1967.
353	Jonathan Brewster Bingham	D	NY-23	January 3, 1965	1st term	
354	John Hall Buchanan Jr.	R	AL-06	January 3, 1965	1st term	
355	Earle Cabell	D	TX-05	January 3, 1965	1st term	
356	Clair Armstrong Callan	D	NE-01	January 3, 1965	1st term	Left the House in 1967.
357	Bo Callaway	R	GA-03	January 3, 1965	1st term	Left the House in 1967.
358	Tim Lee Carter	R	KY-05	January 3, 1965	1st term	
359	Raymond F. Clevenger	D	MI-11	January 3, 1965	1st term	Left the House in 1967.
360	Barber Conable	R	NY-37	January 3, 1965	1st term	
361	John Conyers	D	MI-01	January 3, 1965	1st term	
362	Nathaniel N. Craley Jr.	D	PA-19	January 3, 1965	1st term	Left the House in 1967.
363	John Culver	D	IA-02	January 3, 1965	1st term	
364	Glenn Robert Davis	R	WI-09	January 3, 1965; Previous service, 1947–1957.	6th term*	
365	Bill Dickinson	R	AL-02	January 3, 1965	1st term	
366	John G. Dow	D	NY-27	January 3, 1965	1st term	
367	John Duncan Sr.	R	TN-02	January 3, 1965	1st term	
368	Kenneth W. Dyal	D	CA-33	January 3, 1965	1st term	Left the House in 1967.
369	Jack Edwards	R	AL-01	January 3, 1965	1st term	
370	John N. Erlenborn	R	IL-14	January 3, 1965	1st term	
371	Frank Evans	D	CO-03	January 3, 1965	1st term	
372	Charles R. Farnsley	D	KY-03	January 3, 1965	1st term	Left the House in 1967.
373	Billie S. Farnum	D	MI-19	January 3, 1965	1st term	Left the House in 1967.
374	Tom Foley	D	WA-05	January 3, 1965	1st term	
375	William Ford	D	MI-15	January 3, 1965	1st term	
376	Kika De la Garza	D	TX-15	January 3, 1965	1st term	
377	John J. Gilligan	D	OH-01	January 3, 1965	1st term	Left the House in 1967.
378	Stanley L. Greigg	D	IA-06	January 3, 1965	1st term	Left the House in 1967.
379	George W. Grider	D	TN-09	January 3, 1965	1st term	Left the House in 1967.
380	Lee Hamilton	D	IN-09	January 3, 1965	1st term	
381	James M. Hanley	D	NY-34	January 3, 1965	1st term	
382	George V. Hansen	R	ID-02	January 3, 1965	1st term	
383	John R. Hansen	D	IA-07	January 3, 1965	1st term	Left the House in 1967.
384	William Hathaway	D	ME-02	January 3, 1965	1st term	
385	Henry Helstoski	D	NJ-09	January 3, 1965	1st term	
386	Floyd Hicks	D	WA-06	January 3, 1965	1st term	
387	James J. Howard	D	NJ-03	January 3, 1965	1st term	
388	Joseph Oliva Huot	D	NH-01	January 3, 1965	1st term	Left the House in 1967.
389	Donald J. Irwin	D	CT-04	January 3, 1965; Previous service, 1959–1961.	2nd term*	
390	Andrew Jacobs Jr.	D	IN-11	January 3, 1965	1st term	Left the House in 1967.
391	Jed Johnson Jr.	D	OK-06	January 3, 1965	1st term	Left the House in 1967.
392	James Kee	D	WV-05	January 3, 1965	1st term	
393	David S. King	D	UT-02	January 3, 1965; Previous service, 1959–1963.	3rd term*	Left the House in 1967.
394	Paul J. Krebs	D	NJ-12	January 3, 1965	1st term	Left the House in 1967.
395	Speedy O. Long	D	LA-08	January 3, 1965	1st term	
396	Rodney M. Love	D	OH-03	January 3, 1965	1st term	Left the House in 1967.
397	Hervey Machen	D	MD-05	January 3, 1965	1st term	
398	James MacKay	D	GA-04	January 3, 1965	1st term	Left the House in 1967.
399	John C. Mackie	D	MI-07	January 3, 1965	1st term	Left the House in 1967.
400	James D. Martin	R	AL-07	January 3, 1965	1st term	Left the House in 1967.
401	Richard D. McCarthy	D	NY-39	January 3, 1965	1st term	
402	Robert C. McEwen	R	NY-31	January 3, 1965	1st term	
403	Thomas C. McGrath Jr.	D	NJ-02	January 3, 1965	1st term	Left the House in 1967.
404	Roy H. McVicker	D	CO-02	January 3, 1965	1st term	Left the House in 1967.
405	Lloyd Meeds	D	WA-02	January 3, 1965	1st term	
406	Patsy Mink	D	HI	January 3, 1965	1st term	
407	Chester L. Mize	R	KS-02	January 3, 1965	1st term	
408	Walter H. Moeller	D	OH-10	January 3, 1965; Previous service, 1959–1963.	3rd term*	Left the House in 1967.
409	Maston E. O'Neal Jr.	D	GA-02	January 3, 1965	1st term	
410	Richard Ottinger	D	NY-25	January 3, 1965	1st term	
411	John Abner Race	D	WI-06	January 3, 1965	1st term	Left the House in 1967.
412	Rolland W. Redlin	D	ND-02	January 3, 1965	1st term	Left the House in 1967.
413	Edwin Reinecke	R	CA-27	January 3, 1965	1st term	
414	Joseph Y. Resnick	D	NY-28	January 3, 1965	1st term	
415	Teno Roncalio	D	WY	January 3, 1965	1st term	Left the House in 1967.
416	Daniel J. Ronan	D	IL-06	January 3, 1965	1st term	
417	David E. Satterfield III	D	VA-03	January 3, 1965	1st term	
418	James H. Scheuer	D	NY-21	January 3, 1965	1st term	
419	Gale Schisler	D	IL-19	January 3, 1965	1st term	Left the House in 1967.
420	John R. Schmidhauser	D	IA-01	January 3, 1965	1st term	Left the House in 1967.
421	Henry P. Smith III	R	NY-40	January 3, 1965	1st term	
422	Lynn E. Stalbaum	D	WI-01	January 3, 1965	1st term	Left the House in 1967.
423	J. William Stanton	R	OH-11	January 3, 1965	1st term	
424	Robert E. Sweeney	D	OH	January 3, 1965	1st term	Left the House in 1967.
425	Herbert Tenzer	D	NY-05	January 3, 1965	1st term	
426	Paul H. Todd Jr.	D	MI-03	January 3, 1965	1st term	Left the House in 1967.
427	John V. Tunney	D	CA-38	January 3, 1965	1st term	
428	Prentiss Walker	R	MS-04	January 3, 1965	1st term	Left the House in 1967.
429	Lester L. Wolff	D	NY-03	January 3, 1965	1st term	
430	Joseph P. Vigorito	D	PA-24	January 3, 1965	1st term	
431	Weston E. Vivian	D	MI-02	January 3, 1965	1st term	Left the House in 1967.
432	E. S. Johnny Walker	D	NM	January 3, 1965	1st term	
433	George Watkins	R	PA-07	January 3, 1965	1st term	
434	Richard Crawford White	D	TX-16	January 3, 1965	1st term	
435	Sidney Yates	D	IL-09	January 3, 1965; Previous service, 1949–1963.	8th term*	
	Albert Watson	R	SC-02	June 15, 1965; Previous service, 1963–1965.	3rd term*	
	Edwin Edwards	D	LA-07	October 2, 1965	1st term	
	Clarence E. Brown Jr.	R	OH-07	November 2, 1965	1st term	
	Thomas M. Rees	D	CA-26	December 15, 1965	1st term	
	Walter B. Jones Sr.	D	NC-01	February 5, 1966	1st term	
	Theodore R. Kupferman	R	NY-17	February 8, 1966	1st term	
	Lera Millard Thomas	D	TX-08	March 26, 1966	1st term	Left the House in 1967.
	Jerome R. Waldie	D	CA-14	June 7, 1966	1st term	
	Guy Vander Jagt	R	MI-09	November 8, 1966	1st term	
	David Pryor	D	AR-04	November 8, 1966	1st term	

== Delegates ==
Rank	Delegate	Party	District	Seniority date (Previous service, if any)	No.# of term(s)	Notes
1	Santiago Polanco-Abreu	D	PR	January 3, 1965	1st term	

== See also ==
- 89th United States Congress
- List of United States congressional districts
- List of United States senators in the 89th Congress
