= Arizona's 3rd congressional district =

U.S. House district for Arizona

Coordinates: 32°25′26″N 112°24′09″W

- Interactive map of district boundaries since January 3, 2023
- Representative: Yassamin Ansari; D–Phoenix
- Distribution: 99.95% urban; 0.05% rural
- Population (2025): 829,161
- Median household income: $71,538
- Ethnicity: 62.6% Hispanic; 19.6% White; 10.1% Black; 2.6% Asian; 2.5% Two or more races; 2.0% Native American; 0.5% other
- Cook PVI: D+22

Arizona's 3rd congressional district is a congressional district that includes most of southern, western, and downtown Phoenix, along with a southern portion of Glendale. The incumbent representative is Democrat Yassamin Ansari.

From 2003 to 2013, most of the district's population was in middle-to-upper class areas in the northern part of Phoenix. Like the metropolitan area in general, the 3rd district leaned Republican, although the southern parts of the district in east-central Phoenix and Paradise Valley were more competitive between the parties. With a Cook Partisan Voting Index rating of D+22, it is the most Democratic district in Arizona.

== History ==
Arizona picked up a third district after the 1960 census. It encompassed the entire northern portion of the state, essentially wrapping around Phoenix and Maricopa County (the 1st district). After a mid-decade redistricting in 1967, the 3rd absorbed a slice of western Maricopa County, including most of what became the West Valley.

Due in part to explosive growth in the Phoenix/Maricopa portion of the district, the 3rd lost much of its eastern portion in the 1970 census. Although it appeared rural on paper, the great majority of its population lived in the West Valley. By the 1970s, as many people lived in the West Valley as in the rest of the district combined.

After the 1990 census, the district was reconfigured to include the Hopi Reservation on the other side of the state. This was a product of longstanding disputes between the Hopi and Navajo. Since tribal boundary disputes are a federal matter, it was long believed inappropriate to include both tribes' reservations in the same congressional district. However, the Hopi reservation is completely surrounded by the Navajo reservation. The final map saw the Hopi reservation connected to the rest of the district by a long, narrow tendril stretching through Coconino County. This was the only way to allow the district to remain contiguous without covering significant portions of Navajo land.

After the 2000 census, this district essentially became the 2nd district, while the 3rd was reconfigured to include much of what had been the 4th district. It now contained most of northern Phoenix as well as some of its northern suburbs. Most of the district's population was in middle-to-upper-class areas in the northern part of Phoenix. Like the metropolitan area in general, the 3rd district leaned Republican, although the southern parts of the district in east-central Phoenix and Paradise Valley were more competitive between the parties.

George W. Bush received 58% of the vote in this district in 2004. John McCain took in 56.47% of the vote in the district in 2008 while Barack Obama received 42.34%.

Most of that territory became the 6th district after the 2010 census, while the 3rd was shifted to cover most of what had been the 7th district. This version of the 3rd stretched from western Tucson to Yuma, running along the entire length of the border between Arizona and Mexico. This district, in turn, had mostly been the 2nd district from 1951 to 2003.

After the 2020 census, this district essentially became the 7th district once again, while the 3rd was redrawn to cover much of the former (2013-2022) 7th. It now included much of inner Phoenix, as well as Glendale. Much of this district, in turn, had been the 4th district from 2003 to 2013.

== Composition ==
For the 118th and successive Congresses (based on redistricting following the 2020 census), the district contains the following counties and communities:

Maricopa County (4)
Glendale (part; also 8th and 9th), Guadalupe, Phoenix (part; also 1st, 4th, and 8th), Tempe (part; also 4th)

== Recent election results from statewide races ==
Year	Office	Results
2003–2013 Boundaries
2004	President	Bush 57.9% - 41.5%
2008	President	McCain 56.4% - 42.3%
2010	Senate	McCain 63.3% - 30.3%
2010	Governor	Brewer 55.6% - 40.9%
2010	Secretary of State	Bennett 62.8% - 37.1%
2010	Attorney General	Horne 53.1% - 46.7%
2010	Treasurer	Ducey 55.8% - 37.4%
2013–2023 Boundaries
2008	President	Obama 58.2% - 40.7%
2012	President	Obama 61.4% - 36.9%
2012	Senate	Carmona 63.1% - 32.8%
2014	Governor	DuVal 56.3% - 38.8%
2016	President	Clinton 61.6% - 32.1%
2016	Senate	Kirkpatrick 54.2% - 40.1%
2018	Senate	Sinema 63.8% - 32.9%
2018	Governor	Garcia 57.7% - 39.5%
2018	Attorney General	Contreras 65.3% - 34.5%
2020	President	Biden 62.8% - 35.7%
2020	Senate (Spec.)	Kelly 65.5% - 34.5%
2023–2033 Boundaries
2016	President	Clinton 71% - 21%
2016	Senate	Kirkpatrick 63% - 31%
2018	Senate	Sinema 76% - 20%
2018	Governor	Garcia 68% - 28%
2020	President	Biden 75% - 24%
2020	Senate (Spec.)	Kelly 77% - 23%
2022	Senate	Kelly 76% - 21%
2022	Governor	Hobbs 75% - 24%
2022	Secretary of State	Fontes 78% - 22%
2022	Attorney General	Mayes 76% - 24%
2022	Treasurer	Quezada 72% - 28%
2024	President	Harris 69% - 29%
2024	Senate	Gallego 73% - 24%

== List of members representing the district ==
Arizona began sending a third member to the House after the 1960 census.

Representative	Party	Years	Cong ress	Electoral history	Geography and counties
District created January 3, 1963
George F. Senner Jr. (Miami)	Democratic	January 3, 1963 – January 3, 1967	88th 89th	First elected in 1962. Re-elected in 1964. Lost re-election.	1963–1967: Northern Arizona: Apache, Coconino, Gila, Graham, Greenlee, Mohave, Navajo, Yavapai
Sam Steiger (Prescott)	Republican	January 3, 1967 – January 3, 1977	90th 91st 92nd 93rd 94th	First elected in 1966. Re-elected in 1968. Re-elected in 1970. Re-elected in 1972. Re-elected in 1974. Retired to run for U.S. Senator.	1967–1973: Northern Arizona, including parts of Metro Phoenix: Apache, Coconino, Gila, Graham, Greenlee, Mohave, Navajo, Yavapai, Maricopa (part)
Sam Steiger (Prescott)	Republican	January 3, 1967 – January 3, 1977	90th 91st 92nd 93rd 94th	First elected in 1966. Re-elected in 1968. Re-elected in 1970. Re-elected in 1972. Re-elected in 1974. Retired to run for U.S. Senator.	1973–1983: Western Arizona, including parts of Metro Phoenix: Coconino, Mohave, Yavapai, Yuma, Maricopa (part)
Bob Stump (Tolleson)	Democratic	January 3, 1977 – January 3, 1983	95th 96th 97th 98th 99th 100th 101st 102nd 103rd 104th 105th 106th 107th	First elected in 1976. Re-elected in 1978. Re-elected in 1980. Changed political parties. Re-elected in 1982. Re-elected in 1984. Re-elected in 1986. Re-elected in 1988. Re-elected in 1990. Re-elected in 1992. Re-elected in 1994. Re-elected in 1996. Re-elected in 1998. Re-elected in 2000. Retired.	1973–1983: Western Arizona, including parts of Metro Phoenix: Coconino, Mohave, Yavapai, Yuma, Maricopa (part)
Bob Stump (Tolleson)	Republican	January 3, 1983 – January 3, 2003	95th 96th 97th 98th 99th 100th 101st 102nd 103rd 104th 105th 106th 107th	First elected in 1976. Re-elected in 1978. Re-elected in 1980. Changed political parties. Re-elected in 1982. Re-elected in 1984. Re-elected in 1986. Re-elected in 1988. Re-elected in 1990. Re-elected in 1992. Re-elected in 1994. Re-elected in 1996. Re-elected in 1998. Re-elected in 2000. Retired.	1983–1993: Western Arizona, including parts of Metro Phoenix: Coconino, La Paz, Mohave, Yavapai, Maricopa (part), Yuma (part)
Bob Stump (Tolleson)	Republican	January 3, 1983 – January 3, 2003	95th 96th 97th 98th 99th 100th 101st 102nd 103rd 104th 105th 106th 107th	First elected in 1976. Re-elected in 1978. Re-elected in 1980. Changed political parties. Re-elected in 1982. Re-elected in 1984. Re-elected in 1986. Re-elected in 1988. Re-elected in 1990. Re-elected in 1992. Re-elected in 1994. Re-elected in 1996. Re-elected in 1998. Re-elected in 2000. Retired.	1993–2003: Western Arizona, including parts of Metro Phoenix: La Paz, Mohave, Yavapai, Coconino (part), Maricopa (part), Navajo (part)
John Shadegg (Phoenix)	Republican	January 3, 2003 – January 3, 2011	108th 109th 110th 111th	Redistricted from the 4th district and re-elected in 2002. Re-elected in 2004. Re-elected in 2006. Re-elected in 2008. Retired.	2003–2013: Parts of Metro Phoenix: Maricopa (part)
Ben Quayle (Phoenix)	Republican	January 3, 2011 – January 3, 2013	112th	Elected in 2010. Redistricted to the 6th district and lost renomination.	2003–2013: Parts of Metro Phoenix: Maricopa (part)
Raúl Grijalva (Tucson)	Democratic	January 3, 2013 – January 3, 2023	113th 114th 115th 116th 117th	Redistricted from the 7th district and re-elected in 2012. Re-elected in 2014. Re-elected in 2016. Re-elected in 2018. Re-elected in 2020. Redistricted to the 7th district.	2013–2023: Southern Arizona: Maricopa (part), Pima (part), Pinal (part), Santa Cruz (part), Tucson (part), Yuma (part)
Ruben Gallego (Phoenix)	Democratic	January 3, 2023 – January 3, 2025	118th	Redistricted from the 7th district and re-elected in 2022. Retired to run for U.S. senator.	2023–present:
Yassamin Ansari (Phoenix)	Democratic	January 3, 2025 – present	119th	Elected in 2024. Re-elected in 2026.	2023–present:

== Recent election results ==
=== 2002–2012 ===
==== 2002 ====
Arizona's 3rd Congressional District House Election, 2002
Party	Candidate	Votes	%
Republican	John Shadegg	104,847	67.3
Democratic	Charles Hill	47,173	30.3
Libertarian	Mark Yannone	3,731	2.4
Majority		57,674	37.0
Total votes		155,751	100.0
Republican win (new boundaries)			

==== 2004 ====
Arizona's 3rd Congressional District House Election, 2004
Party	Candidate	Votes	%	±%
Republican	John Shadegg (Incumbent)	181,012	80.1	+12.8
Libertarian	Mark Yannone	44,962	19.9	+17.5
Majority		136,050	60.2	+23.2
Total votes		225,974	100.0	
Republican hold		Swing	–2.4	

==== 2006 ====
Arizona's 3rd Congressional District House Election, 2006
Party	Candidate	Votes	%	±%
Republican	John Shadegg (Incumbent)	112,519	59.3	–20.8
Democratic	Herb Paine	72,586	38.2	N/a
Libertarian	Mark Yannone	4,744	2.5	–17.4
Majority		39,933	21.0	–39.2
Total votes		189,849	100.0	
Republican hold		Swing	–19.6	

==== 2008 ====
Arizona's 3rd Congressional District House Election, 2008
Party	Candidate	Votes	%	±%
Republican	John Shadegg (Incumbent)	148,800	54.1	–5.2
Democratic	Bob Lord	115,759	42.1	+3.8
Libertarian	Michael Shoen	10,602	3.9	+1.4
Majority		33,041	12.0	–9.0
Total votes		275,161	100.0	
Republican hold		Swing	–4.5	

==== 2010 ====
Arizona's 3rd Congressional District House Election, 2010
Party	Candidate	Votes	%	±%
Republican	Ben Quayle	108,689	52.2	–1.8
Democratic	Jon Hulburd	85,610	41.1	–0.9
Libertarian	Michael Shoen	10,478	5.0	+1.2
Green	Leonard Clark	3,294	1.6	N/a
Majority		23,079	11.1	–0.9
Total votes		208,071	100.0	
Republican hold		Swing	–0.9	

=== 2012–2022 ===
==== 2012 ====
Arizona's 3rd Congressional District House Election, 2012
Party	Candidate	Votes	%
Democratic	Raúl Grijalva (Incumbent)	98,468	58.4
Republican	Gabriela Saucedo Mercer	62,663	37.1
Libertarian	Blanca Guerra	7,567	4.5
Majority		35,805	21.2
Total votes		168,698	100.0
Democratic win (new boundaries)			

==== 2014 ====
Arizona's 3rd Congressional District House Election, 2014
Party	Candidate	Votes	%	±%
Democratic	Raúl Grijalva (Incumbent)	58,192	55.7	–2.6
Republican	Gabriela Saucedo Mercer	46,185	44.2	+7.1
Write-in		51	0.0	N/a
Majority		12,007	11.5	–9.7
Total votes		104,428	100.0	
Democratic hold		Swing	–4.9	

==== 2016 ====
Arizona's 3rd Congressional District House Election, 2016
Party	Candidate	Votes	%	±%
Democratic	Raúl Grijalva (Incumbent)	148,973	98.6	+42.9
Republican	write ins	1,635	1.1	–43.1
Write-in		332	0.2	+0.2
Write-In	Federico Sanchez	144	0.1	N/a
Majority		147,338	97.5	+86.0
Total votes		151,084	100.0	
Democratic hold		Swing	+43.0	

==== 2018 ====
Arizona's 3rd Congressional District House Election, 2018
Party	Candidate	Votes	%	±%
Democratic	Raúl Grijalva (Incumbent)	114,650	63.9	–34.7
Republican	Nicolas Pierson	64,868	36.1	+35.1
Majority		49,782	27.7	–69.8
Total votes		179,518	100.0	
Democratic hold		Swing	–34.9	

==== 2020 ====
Arizona's 3rd Congressional District House Election, 2020
Party	Candidate	Votes	%	±%
Democratic	Raúl Grijalva (incumbent)	174,243	64.6	+0.7
Republican	Daniel Wood	95,594	35.4	–0.7
Majority		78,649	29.1	+1.4
Total votes		269,837	100.0	
Democratic hold		Swing	+0.7	

=== 2022–present ===
==== 2022 ====
Arizona's 3rd Congressional District House Election, 2022
Party	Candidate	Votes	%
Democratic	Ruben Gallego (incumbent)	108,599	77.0
Republican	Jeff Zink	32,475	23.0
Majority		76,124	54.0
Total votes		141,074	100.0
Democratic win (new boundaries)			

==== 2024 ====
Arizona's 3rd Congressional District House Election, 2024
Party	Candidate	Votes	%	±%
Democratic	Yassamin Ansari	143,336	70.9	–6.0
Republican	Jeff Zink	53,705	26.6	+3.6
Green	Alan Aversa	5,008	2.5	N/a
Write-in		16	0.0	N/a
Majority		89,631	44.4	–9.6
Total votes		202,065	100.0	
Democratic hold		Swing	–4.8	

== See also ==
- Arizona's congressional districts
- List of United States congressional districts
