= Gordon H. Scherer =

American politician

Gordon Harry Scherer
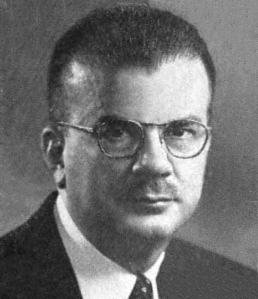

Member of the Ohio House of Representatives from the 71st district
- In office January 3, 1965 – December 31, 1972
- Preceded by: None (First)
- Succeeded by: John Brandenberg

Member of the U.S. House of Representatives from Ohio's 1st district
- In office January 3, 1953 – January 3, 1963
- Preceded by: Charles H. Elston
- Succeeded by: Carl West Rich

Personal details
- Born: December 26, 1906 Cincinnati, Ohio
- Died: August 13, 1988 (aged 81) Cincinnati, Ohio
- Resting place: Spring Grove Cemetery
- Party: Republican
- Education: Salmon P. Chase College of Law

Gordon Harry Scherer (December 26, 1906 – August 13, 1988) was an American lawyer and politician of the Republican party who served five terms as a U.S. representative from Ohio from 1953 to 1963.

== Biography ==
Scherer earned a law degree in 1929 from the Salmon P. Chase College of Law and practiced law in Cincinnati, Ohio. From 1933 to 1941, he worked for the Hamilton County, Ohio, prosecutor. From 1943 to 1944, he served as Cincinnati's safety director. From 1945 to 1946, Scherer served on the city's planning commission. Scherer was then elected to the Cincinnati city council, on which he served from 1945 to 1949.

In 1952, Scherer stood successfully for election to the U.S. House of Representatives and began serving in 1953 (83rd Congress). He was re-elected in 1954, 1956, 1958, and 1960. He declined to run for election again in 1962, returning to his private law practice. Following his time in Congress, Scherer served four term in the Ohio House of Representatives, from 1965 to 1972. Scherer was a member of the U.S. House of Representatives' Committee on Un-American Activities, (HUAC). Scherer voted present on the Civil Rights Act of 1957, but voted in favor of the Civil Rights Act of 1960.

Scherer served as a delegate from Ohio to the 1964 and 1968 Republican National Convention. He was chairman of the Hamilton County Republican Party from 1962 to 1968. From 1970 to 1973, Scherer was a member of the United States National Commission for UNESCO. He was on the executive board of that commission from 1974 to 1975. In 1972, Scherer was appointed the U.S. representative to the United Nations, in which capacity he served from 1972 to 1973. He died in 1988.

== See also ==
- List of members of the House Un-American Activities Committee
- List of United States representatives from Ohio

U.S. House of Representatives
Preceded by Charles H. Elston	Member of the U.S. House of Representatives from Ohio's 1st congressional district 1953-1963	Succeeded by Carl W. Rich
