= 1988 United States Senate election in Arizona =

- November 8, 1988
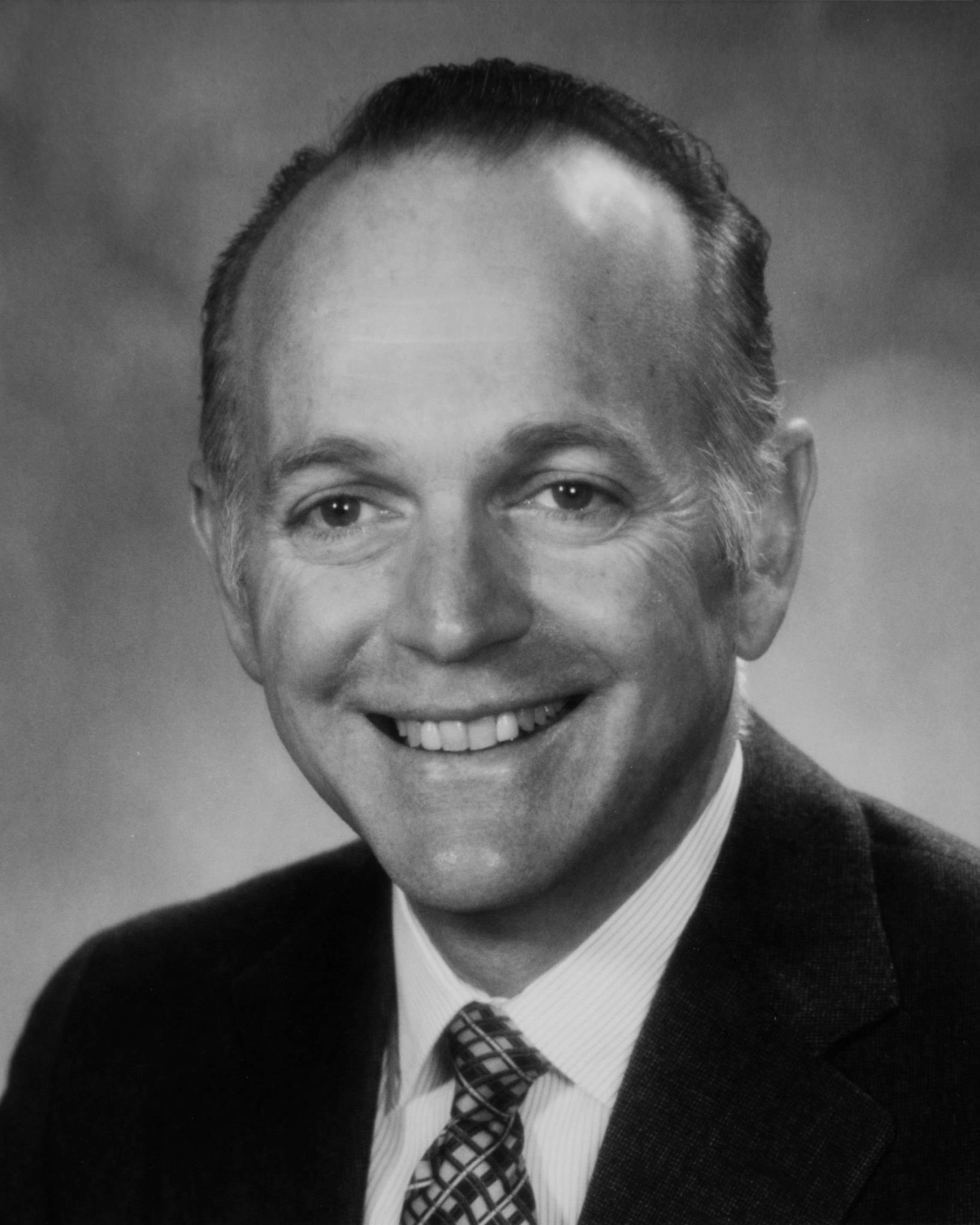

Nominee	Dennis DeConcini	Keith DeGreen
Party	Democratic	Republican
Popular vote	660,403	478,060
Percentage	56.71%	41.05%
- County results DeConcini: 40–50% 50–60% 60–70% 70–80%
U.S. senator before election
Dennis DeConcini
Democratic
Elected U.S. Senator
Dennis DeConcini
Democratic

The 1988 United States Senate election in Arizona took place on November 8, 1988. Incumbent Democratic U.S. Senator Dennis DeConcini was reelected to a third term, even as incumbent Republican Vice President George H. W Bush won the state for president on the same ballot. This was the last time until 2018 that Democrats won a U.S. Senate seat in Arizona.

== Major candidates ==
=== Democratic ===
- Dennis DeConcini, Incumbent U.S. Senator

=== Republican ===
- Keith DeGreen, Marine veteran and financial advisor

== Results ==
General election results
Party	Candidate	Votes	%	±%
Democratic	Dennis DeConcini (Incumbent)	660,403	56.71%	−0.20%
Republican	Keith DeGreen	478,060	41.05%	+0.75%
Libertarian	Rick Tompkins	20,849	1.79%	−0.99%
New Alliance	Ed Finkelstein	5,195	0.45%	
Write-in		32	0.00%	
Majority		182,343	15.66%	−0.95%
Turnout		1,164,539		
Democratic hold		Swing		

== See also ==
- 1988 United States Senate elections
- 1988 United States presidential election in Arizona
