= 1982 United States Senate election in Arizona =

- November 2, 1982
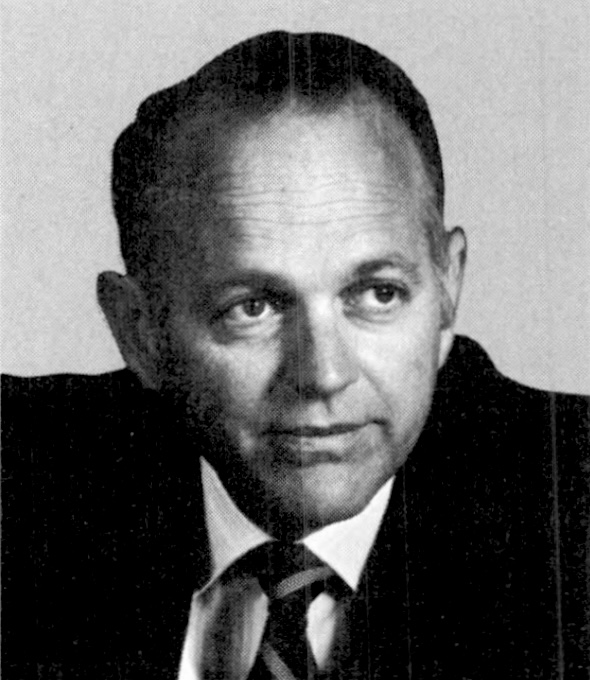

Nominee	Dennis DeConcini	Pete Dunn
Party	Democratic	Republican
Popular vote	411,970	291,749
Percentage	56.91%	40.30%
- County results DeConcini: 50–60% 60–70% 70–80% 80–90% Dunn: 40–50%
U.S. senator before election
Dennis DeConcini
Democratic
Elected U.S. Senator
Dennis DeConcini
Democratic

The 1982 United States Senate election in Arizona took place on November 2, 1982. Incumbent Democratic U.S. Senator Dennis DeConcini won re-election to a second term.

== Democratic primary ==
=== Candidate ===
- Dennis DeConcini, incumbent U.S. Senator
- Caroline P. Killeen, former Roman Catholic nun

=== Results ===
Democratic primary results
Party	Candidate	Votes	%
Democratic	Dennis DeConcini (incumbent)	140,328	84.4
Democratic	Caroline P. Killeen	25,909	15.6
Total votes		166,237	100.0

== Republican primary ==
=== Candidates ===
- Pete Dunn, State Representative
- Dean Sellers

=== Results ===
Republican Primary results
Party	Candidate	Votes	%
Republican	Pete Dunn	97,391	55.1
Republican	Dean Sellers	79,375	44.9
Total votes		176,766	100.0

== General election ==
=== Candidates ===
- Dennis DeConcini (D), Incumbent U.S. Senator
- Pete Dunn (R), State Representative

== Results ==
General election results
Party	Candidate	Votes	%	±%
Democratic	Dennis DeConcini (Incumbent)	411,970	56.91%	+2.90%
Republican	Peter Dunn	291,749	40.30%	−3.04%
Libertarian	Randall Clamons	20,100	2.78%	+1.79%
Write-in		66	0.01%	
Majority		120,221	16.61%	+5.94%
Turnout		723,885		
Democratic hold		Swing		

== See also ==
- 1982 United States Senate elections
