= List of members of the House Un-American Activities Committee =

Alabama Democrat Joe Starnes with Chairman Martin Dies and Chief Investigator J. B. Matthews, Aug. 1938.

This list of members of the House Un-American Activities Committee details the names of those members of the United States House of Representatives who served on the House Un-American Activities Committee (HUAC) from its formation as the "Special Committee to Investigate Un-American Activities" in 1938 until the dissolution of the "House Internal Security Committee" in 1975.

New members of the committee marked with bold type.

== Special Committee to Investigate Un-American Activities (1938–1944) ==
Commonly known as the "Dies Committee." The permanent secretary of the committee was Robert E. Stripling throughout.

=== 75th Congress (1938) ===
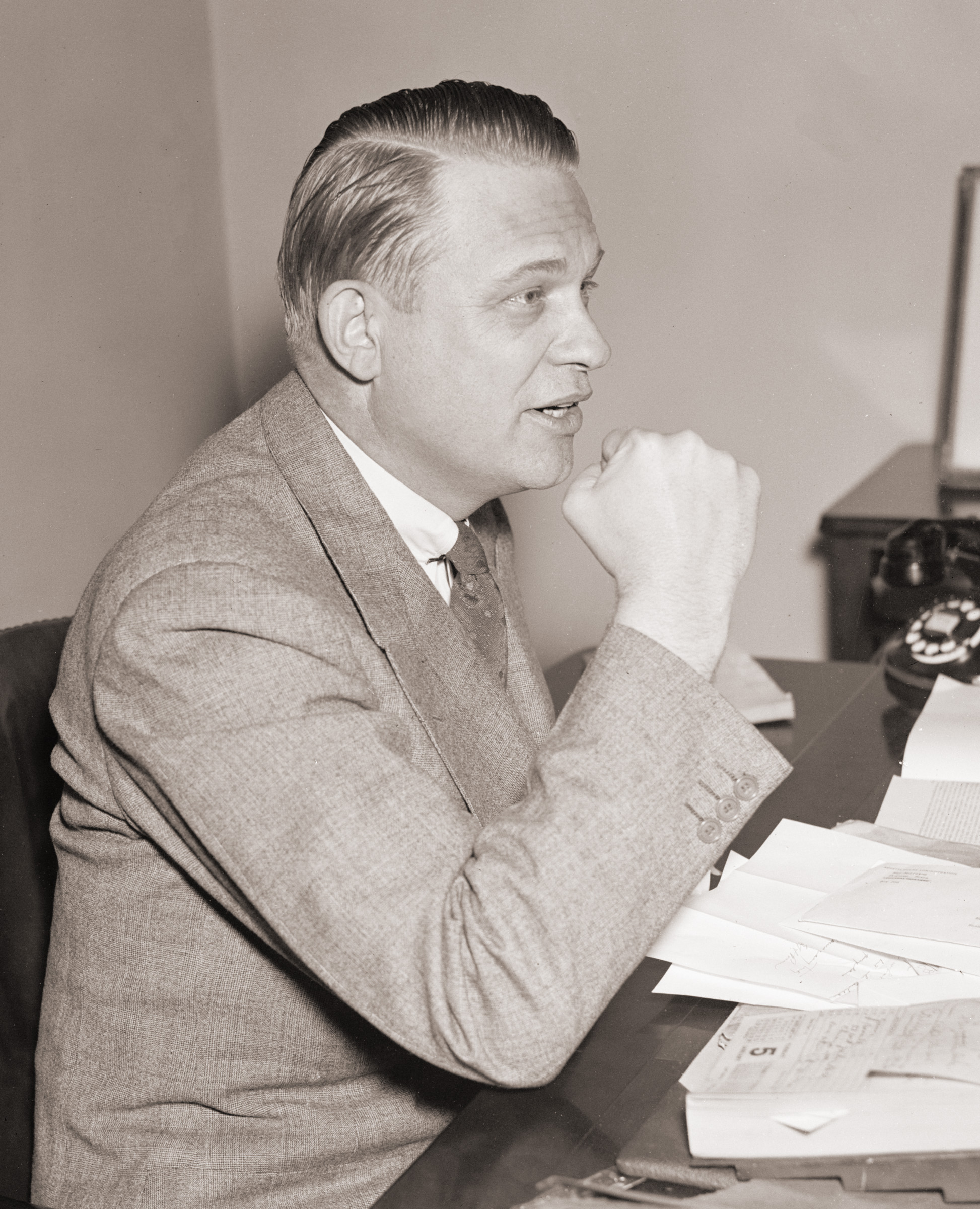
Conservative Texas Democrat Martin Dies Jr. was chair of the Special Committee to Investigate Un-American Activities for its entire seven-year duration.

- Martin Dies Jr. (D-Texas), Chairman
- John J. Dempsey (D-New Mexico)
- Arthur D. Healey (D-Massachusetts)
- Harold G. Mosier (D-Ohio)
- Joe Starnes (D-Alabama)
- Noah M. Mason (R-Illinois)
- J. Parnell Thomas (R-New Jersey)

=== 76th Congress (1939–1940) ===
- Martin Dies Jr. (D-Texas), Chairman
- John J. Dempsey (D-New Mexico)
- Arthur D. Healey (D-Massachusetts)
  - Joseph E. Casey (D-Massachusetts) —replacement for Healey
- Joe Starnes (D-Alabama)
- Jerry Voorhis (D- California)
- Noah M. Mason (R-Illinois)
- J. Parnell Thomas (R-New Jersey)

=== 77th Congress (1941–1942) ===
- Martin Dies Jr. (D-Texas), Chairman
- Harry P. Beam (D-Illinois)
- Joseph E. Casey (D-Massachusetts)
- Joe Starnes (D-Alabama)
- Jerry Voorhis (D- California)
- Noah M. Mason (R-Illinois)
- J. Parnell Thomas (R-New Jersey)

=== 78th Congress (1943–1944) ===
- Martin Dies Jr. (D-Texas), Chairman
- Wirt Courtney (D-Tennessee)
- John M. Costello (D-California)
- Herman P. Eberharter (D-Pennsylvania)
- Joe Starnes (D-Alabama)
- Noah M. Mason (R-Illinois)
  - Fred E. Busbey (R-Illinois) —Replacement for Mason in 1944.
- Karl Mundt (R-South Dakota)
- J. Parnell Thomas (R-New Jersey)

== Committee on Un-American Activities (1945–1968) ==
Effective with the 79th Congress of 1945, the former special committee of the House of Representatives was made permanent, expanded to nine members, and renamed. Permanent secretaries of the committee would be Robert E. Stripling (1945–1948), John W. Carrington (1949–1952), Thomas W. Beale Sr. (1953–1956), Richard Arens (1957–1960), Frank S. Tavenner Jr. (1961–1962), Francis J. McNamara (1963–1968).

=== 79th Congress (1945–1946) ===
- Edward J. Hart (D-New Jersey), Chairman
  - John S. Wood (D-Georgia) —Replacement for Hart as Chairman.
- Herbert C. Bonner (D-North Carolina)
- John R. Murdock (D-Arizona)
- J. Hardin Peterson (D-Florida)
- John E. Rankin (D-Mississippi)
- J. W. Robinson (D-Utah)
- Gerald W. Landis (R-Indiana)
- Karl E. Mundt (R-South Dakota)
- J. Parnell Thomas (R-New Jersey)

=== 80th Congress (1947–1948) ===
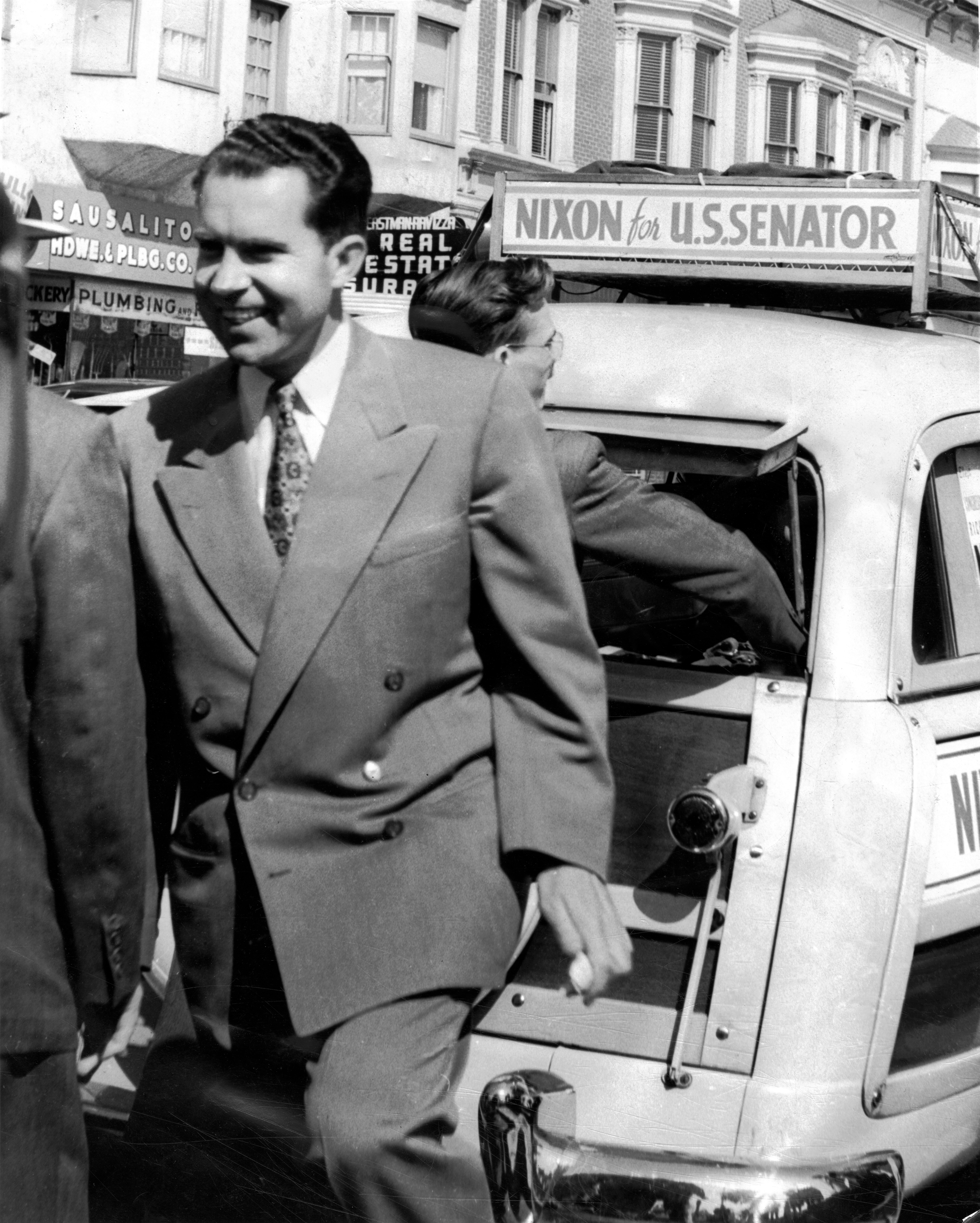
Future U.S. President Richard M. Nixon was a HUAC member from 1947 until election to the U.S. Senate in November 1950

- J. Parnell Thomas (R-New Jersey), Chairman
- John McDowell (R-Pennsylvania)
- Karl E. Mundt (R-South Dakota)
- Richard M. Nixon (R-California)
- Richard B. Vail (R-Illinois)
- Herbert C. Bonner (D-North Carolina)
  - F. Edward Hébert (D-Louisiana) —Replacement for Bonner in 1948.
- J. Hardin Peterson (D-Florida)
- John E. Rankin (D-Mississippi)
- John S. Wood (D-Georgia)
- Harold F. Youngblood (R-Michigan)

=== 81st Congress (1949–1950) ===
- John S. Wood (D-Georgia), Chairman
- Burr P. Harrison (D-Virginia)
- John McSweeney (D-Ohio)
- Morgan M. Moulder (D-Missouri)
- Francis E. Walter (D-Pennsylvania)
- Francis Case (R-South Dakota)
- Richard M. Nixon (R-California)
- J. Parnell Thomas (R-New Jersey) —Ranking Republican in 1949, vacated position by end of that year, leaving Nixon as ranking Republican.
- Harold H. Velde (R-Illinois)

=== 82nd Congress (1951–1952) ===
- John S. Wood (D-Georgia), Chairman
- Clyde Doyle (D-California)
- James B. Frazier Jr. (D-Tennessee)
- Morgan M. Moulder (D-Missouri)
- Francis E. Walter (D-Pennsylvania)
- Donald L. Jackson (R-California)
- Bernard W. "Pat" Kearney (R-New York)
- Charles E. Potter (R-Michigan)
- Harold H. Velde (R-Illinois)

=== 83rd Congress (1953–1954) ===
- Harold H. Velde (R-Illinois), Chairman
- Kit Clardy (R-Michigan)
- Donald L. Jackson (R-California)
- Bernard W. "Pat" Kearney (R-New York)
- Gordon H. Scherer (R-Ohio)
- Clyde Doyle (D-California)
- James B. Frazier Jr. (D-Tennessee)
- Morgan M. Moulder (D-Missouri)
- Francis E. Walter (D-Pennsylvania)

=== 84th Congress (1955–1956) ===
Pennsylvania Democrat Francis E. Walter, a member of HUAC from 1951, would serve as chairman of the committee from January 1955 until his death in 1963.

- Francis E. Walter (D-Pennsylvania), Chairman
- Clyde Doyle (D-California)
- James B. Frazier Jr. (D-Tennessee)
- Morgan M. Moulder (D-Missouri)
- Edwin E. Willis (D-Louisiana)
- Donald L. Jackson (R-California)
- Bernard W. "Pat" Kearney (R-New York)
- Gordon H. Scherer (R-Ohio)
- Harold H. Velde (R-Illinois)

=== 85th Congress (1957–1958) ===
- Francis E. Walter (D-Pennsylvania), Chairman
- Clyde Doyle (D-California)
- James B. Frazier Jr. (D-Tennessee)
- Morgan M. Moulder (D-Missouri)
- Edwin E. Willis (D-Louisiana)
- Donald L. Jackson (R-California)
- Bernard W. "Pat" Kearney (R-New York)
- Robert J. McIntosh (R-Michigan)
- Gordon H. Scherer (R-Ohio)

=== 86th Congress (1959–1960) ===
- Francis E. Walter (D-Pennsylvania), Chairman
- Clyde Doyle (D-California)
- Morgan M. Moulder (D-Missouri)
- William M. Tuck (D-Virginia)
- Edwin E. Willis (D-Louisiana)
- Donald L. Jackson (R-California)
- August E. Johansen (R-Michigan)
- William E. Miller (R-New York)
- Gordon H. Scherer (R-Ohio)

=== 87th Congress (1961–1962) ===
- Francis E. Walter (D-Pennsylvania), Chairman
- Clyde Doyle (D-California)
- Morgan M. Moulder (D-Missouri)
- William M. Tuck (D-Virginia)
- Edwin E. Willis (D-Louisiana)
- Donald C. Bruce (R-Indiana)
- August E. Johansen (R-Michigan)
- Gordon H. Scherer (R-Ohio)
- Henry C. Schadeberg (R-Wisconsin)

=== 88th Congress (1963–1964) ===
- Francis E. Walter (D-Pennsylvania), Chairman —Died May 31, 1963.
  - Richard H. Ichord (D-Missouri) —Member of the committee in 1964.
- Clyde Doyle (D-California) (1963)
  - George F. Senner Jr. (D-Arizona) —Member of the committee in 1964.
- Joe R. Pool (D-Texas)
- William M. Tuck (D-Virginia)
- Edwin E. Willis (D-Louisiana)
- John M. Ashbrook (R-Ohio)
- Donald C. Bruce (R-Indiana)
- August E. Johansen (R-Michigan)
- Henry C. Schadeberg (R-Wisconsin)

=== 89th Congress (1965–1966) ===
- Edwin E. Willis (D-Louisiana), Chairman
- Richard H. Ichord (D-Missouri)
- Joe R. Pool (D-Texas)
- George F. Senner Jr. (D-Arizona)
- William M. Tuck (D-Virginia)
- Charles L. Weltner (D-Georgia)
- John M. Ashbrook (R-Ohio)
- John H. Buchanan Jr. (R-Alabama)
- Del Clawson (R-California)

=== 90th Congress (1967–1968) ===
- Edwin E. Willis (D-Louisiana), Chairman
- John C. Culver (D-Iowa)
- Richard H. Ichord (D-Missouri)
- Joe R. Pool (D-Texas)
- William M. Tuck (D-Virginia)
- John M. Ashbrook (R-Ohio)
- Del Clawson (R-California)
- Richard L. Roudebush (R-Indiana)
- Albert W. Watson (R-South Carolina)

== Committee on Internal Security ==
Chair of the renamed House Committee on Internal Security for its entire 7-year duration was Democrat Richard H. Ichord Jr. of Missouri.

In February 1969 the name of the committee was changed for a second time. The nine-member Committee on Internal Security would remain in existence until 1975. Chief professional staff members of the Committee on Internal Security included Donald G. Sanders (1969–1973), Robert M. Horner (???–1973), and William H. Stapleton (1974–1975).

The House Committee on Internal Security was formally terminated on January 14, 1975, the day of the opening of the 94th Congress. The Committee's files and staff were transferred on that day to the House Judiciary Committee from whence the Internal Security Committee had sprung.

=== 91st Congress (1969–1970) ===
- Richard H. Ichord (D-Missouri), Chairman
- Edwin W. Edwards (D-Louisiana)
- Claude Pepper (D-Florida)
- Richardson Preyer (D-North Carolina)
- Louis Stokes (D-Ohio)
- John M. Ashbrook (R-Ohio)
- Richard L. Roudebush (R-Indiana)
- William J. Scherle (R-Iowa)
- Albert W. Watson (R-South Carolina)

=== 92nd Congress (1971–1972) ===
- Richard H. Ichord (D-Missouri), Chairman
- Mendel J. Davis (D-South Carolina)
- Robert F. Drinan (D-Massachusetts)
- Claude Pepper (D-Florida)
- Richardson Preyer (D-North Carolina)
- John M. Ashbrook (R-Ohio)
- John G. Schmitz (R-California)
- Fletcher Thompson (R-Georgia)
- Roger H. Zion (R-Indiana)

=== 93rd Congress (1973–1974) ===
- Mendel J. Davis (D-South Carolina)
- Robert F. Drinan (D-Massachusetts)
- Claude Pepper (D-Florida)
- Richardson Preyer (D-North Carolina)
- John M. Ashbrook (R-Ohio)
- J. Herbert Burke (R-Florida)
- Tennyson Guyer (R-Ohio)
- Roger H. Zion (R-Indiana)

== See also ==
- List of organizations described as Communist fronts by the US government
