= List of United States senators in the 89th Congress =

This is a complete list of United States senators during the 89th United States Congress listed by seniority from January 3, 1965, to January 3, 1967.

Order of service is based on the commencement of the senator's first term. Behind this is former service as a senator (only giving the senator seniority within their new incoming class), service as vice president, a House member, a cabinet secretary, or a governor of a state. The final factor is the population of the senator's state.

In this congress, J. William Fulbright (D-Arkansas) was the most senior junior senator and Daniel Brewster (D-Maryland) was the most junior senior senator for most of the congress until A. Willis Robertson retired from the senate when Harry F. Byrd Jr. (D-Virginia) took this distinction in the final days of the congress.

Senators who were sworn in during the middle of the two-year congressional term (up until the last senator who was not sworn in early after winning the November 1966 election) are listed at the end of the list with no number.

== Terms of service ==
Class	Terms of service of senators that expired in years
Class 2	Terms of service of senators that expired in 1967 (AK, AL, AR, CO, DE, GA, IA, ID, IL, KS, KY, LA, MA, ME, MI, MN, MS, MT, NC, NE, NH, NJ, NM, OK, OR, RI, SC, SD, TN, TX, VA, WV, and WY.)
Class 3	Terms of service of senators that expired in 1969 (AK, AL, AR, AZ, CA, CO, CT, DE, FL, GA, HI, IA, ID, IL, IN, KS, KY, LA, MA, ME, MI, MN, MS, NC, ND, NH, NM, NV, NY, OK, OR, SC, SD, TN, TX, VA, WA, WV, and WY.)
Class 1	Terms of service of senators that expired in 1971 (AZ, CA, CT, DE, FL, HI, IN, MA, MD, ME, MI, MN, MO, MS, MT, ND, NE, NJ, NM, NV, NY, OH, PA, RI, TN, TX, UT, VA, VT, WA, WI, WV, and WY.)

== U.S. Senate seniority list ==
U.S. Senate seniority
Rank	Historical rank	Senator (party-state)	Seniority date	Other factors
1	1248	Carl Hayden (D-AZ)	March 4, 1927	
2	1306	Richard Russell, Jr. (D-GA)	January 12, 1933	
3	1311	Harry F. Byrd, Sr. (D-VA)	March 4, 1933	
4	1352	Allen J. Ellender (D-LA)	January 3, 1937	
5	1365	Joseph L. Hill (D-AL)	January 11, 1938	
6	1399	George Aiken (R-VT)	January 10, 1941	
7	1403	James Eastland (D-MS)	January 3, 1943	Previously a senator
8	1417	John Little McClellan (D-AR)	January 3, 1943	
9	1430	Warren G. Magnuson (D-WA)	December 14, 1944	
10	1432	J. William Fulbright (D-AR)	January 3, 1945	Former representative
11	1433	Bourke B. Hickenlooper (R-IA)	January 3, 1945	Former governor, Iowa 20th in population (1940)
12	1435	Olin D. Johnston (D-SC)	January 3, 1945	Former governor, South Carolina 26th in population (1940)
13	1437	Wayne Morse (D-OR)	January 3, 1945	
14	1441	Leverett Saltonstall (R-MA)	January 4, 1945	
15	1446	Milton Young (R-ND)	March 12, 1945	
16	1454	Spessard Holland (D-FL)	September 24, 1946	
17	1458	A. Willis Robertson (D-VA)	November 6, 1946	Former representative (13 years, 10 months)
18	1459	John Sparkman (D-AL)	November 6, 1946	Former representative (9 years, 10 months)
19	1475	John J. Williams (R-DE)	January 3, 1947	
20	1476	John C. Stennis (D-MS)	November 17, 1947	
21	1480	Karl Mundt (R-SD)	December 31, 1948	Former representative
22	1481	Russell B. Long (D-LA)	December 31, 1948	
23	1485	Margaret Chase Smith (R-ME)	January 3, 1949	Former representative (8 years, 7 months)
24	1486	Clinton Anderson (D-NM)	January 3, 1949	Former representative (4 years, 5 months)
25	1490	Paul Douglas (D-IL)	January 3, 1949	
26	1504	Frank Carlson (R-KS)	November 27, 1950	
27	1506	John O. Pastore (D-RI)	December 19, 1950	
28	1507	Everett Dirksen (R-IL)	January 3, 1951	Former representative (16 years)
29	1509	Almer Monroney (D-OK)	January 3, 1951	Former representative (12 years)
30	1511	George Smathers (D-FL)	January 3, 1951	Former representative (4 years)
31	1513	Wallace F. Bennett (R-UT)	January 3, 1951	
32	1523	Thomas Kuchel (R-CA)	January 2, 1953	
33	1524	Albert Gore, Sr. (D-TN)	January 3, 1953	Former representative (14 years)
34	1525	Henry M. Jackson (D-WA)	January 3, 1953	Former representative (12 years)
35	1528	Mike Mansfield (D-MT)	January 3, 1953	Former representative (10 years)
36	1533	Stuart Symington (D-MO)	January 3, 1953	
37	1538	Sam Ervin (D-NC)	June 5, 1954	
38	1544	Norris Cotton (R-NH)	November 8, 1954	Former representative (7 years, 10 months)
39	1545	Roman Hruska (R-NE)	November 8, 1954	Former representative (1 year, 10 months)
40	1547	Alan Bible (D-NV)	December 2, 1954	
41	1550	Carl Curtis (R-NE)	January 1, 1955	
42	1551	Clifford P. Case (R-NJ)	January 3, 1955	Former representative
43	1553	Patrick V. McNamara (D-MI)	January 3, 1955	Maryland 24th in population (1950)
44	1555	Gordon L. Allott (R-CO)	January 3, 1955	Colorado 32nd in population (1950)
45	1456	John Sherman Cooper (R-KY)	November 7, 1956	Previously a senator (twice) (total tenure 4 years, 4 months)
46	1549	Strom Thurmond (R-SC)	November 7, 1956	Previously a senator (1 year, 3 months)
47	1559	Thruston Ballard Morton (R-KY)	January 3, 1957	Former representative
48	1561	Frank J. Lausche (D-OH)	January 3, 1957	Former governor, Ohio 5th in population (1950)
49	1562	Herman Talmadge (D-GA)	January 3, 1957	Former governor, Georgia 13th in population (1950)
50	1563	Joseph S. Clark (D-PA)	January 3, 1957	Pennsylvania 3rd in population (1950)
51	1564	Frank Church (D-ID)	January 3, 1957	Idaho 43rd in population (1950)
52	1565	Jacob K. Javits (R-NY)	January 9, 1957	
53	1567	Ralph Yarborough (D-TX)	April 29, 1957	
54	1568	William Proxmire (D-WI)	August 28, 1957	
55	1570	Ben Jordan (D-NC)	April 19, 1958	
56	1571	Jennings Randolph (D-WV)	November 5, 1958	
57	1572	Hugh Scott (R-PA)	January 3, 1959	Former representative (18 years)
58	1575	Eugene McCarthy (D-MN)	January 3, 1959	Former representative (10 years)
59	1576	Stephen Young (D-OH)	January 3, 1959	Former representative (8 years), Ohio 5th in population (1950)
60	1577	Winston L. Prouty (R-VT)	January 3, 1959	Former representative (8 years), Vermont 46th in population (1950)
61	1578	Robert Byrd (D-WV)	January 3, 1959	Former representative (6 years)
62	1579	Harrison A. Williams (D-NJ)	January 3, 1959	Former representative (4 years), New Jersey 8th in population (1950)
63	1580	Thomas J. Dodd (D-CT)	January 3, 1959	Former representative (4 years), Connecticut 34th in population (1950)
64	1581	Edward L. Bartlett (D-AK)	January 3, 1959	Former delegate
65	1582	Edmund Muskie (D-ME)	January 3, 1959	Former governor, Maine 35th in population (1950)
66	1583	Ernest Gruening (D-AK)	January 3, 1959	Former Territorial Governor, Alaska 50th in population (1950)
67	1584	Philip Hart (D-MI)	January 3, 1959	Michigan 7th in population (1950)
68	1585	Vance Hartke (D-IN)	January 3, 1959	Indiana 11th in population (1950)
69	1586	Frank Moss (D-UT)	January 3, 1959	Utah 38th in population (1950)
70	1587	Gale W. McGee (D-WY)	January 3, 1959	Wyoming 48th in population (1950)
71	1588	Howard Cannon (D-NV)	January 3, 1959	Nevada 49th in population (1950)
72	1590	Hiram Fong (R-HI)	August 21, 1959	
73	1593	Quentin Northrup Burdick (D-ND)	August 8, 1960	
74	1594	Edward V. Long (D-MO)	September 23, 1960	
75	1595	Maurine Neuberger (D-OR)	November 9, 1960	
76	1597	Lee Metcalf (D-MT)	January 3, 1961	Former representative (8 years)
77	1598	James Boggs (R-DE)	January 3, 1961	Former representative (6 years)
78	1600	Jack Miller (R-IA)	January 3, 1961	Iowa 22nd in population (1950)
79	1601	Claiborne Pell (D-RI)	January 3, 1961	Rhode Island 36th in population (1950)
80	1602	John Tower (R-TX)	June 15, 1961	
81	1604	James B. Pearson (R-KS)	January 31, 1962	
82	1606	Len Jordan (R-ID)	August 6, 1962	
83	1607	Milward L. Simpson (R-WY)	November 7, 1962	Former governor
84	1608	Ted Kennedy (D-MA)	November 7, 1962	Massachusetts 9th in population (1960)
85	1609	Thomas J. McIntyre (D-NH)	November 7, 1962	New Hampshire 45th in population (1960)
86	1611	Abraham A. Ribicoff (D-CT)	January 3, 1963	Former representative (4 years), former cabinet secretary
87	1612	Daniel Brewster (D-MD)	January 3, 1963	Former representative (4 years) - Maryland 21st in population (1960)
88	1613	George McGovern (D-SD)	January 3, 1963	Former representative (4 years) - South Dakota 40th in population (1960)
89	1614	Daniel Inouye (D-HI)	January 3, 1963	Former representative (4 years) - Hawaii 43rd in population (1960)
90	1615	Peter H. Dominick (R-CO)	January 3, 1963	Former representative (2 years)
91	1616	Birch Bayh (D-IN)	January 3, 1963	
92	1618	Gaylord Nelson (D-WI)	January 7, 1963	
93	1621	Ross Bass (D-TN)	November 4, 1964	Former representative (9 years, 10 months)
94	1622	Joseph Montoya (D-NM)	November 4, 1964	Former representative (7 years)
95	1623	Fred R. Harris (D-OK)	November 4, 1964	
96	1624	Walter Mondale (D-MN)	December 30, 1964	
97	1625	George Murphy (R-CA)	January 1, 1965	
98	1626	Joseph Tydings (D-MD)	January 3, 1965	Former representative
99	1627	Robert F. Kennedy (D-NY)	January 3, 1965	Former cabinet member
100	1628	Paul Fannin (R-AZ)	January 3, 1965	
	1629	Donald S. Russell (D-SC)	April 22, 1965	
	1630	Harry F. Byrd, Jr. (D-VA)	November 12, 1965	
	1631	Robert P. Griffin (R-MI)	May 11, 1966	
	1632	Ernest Hollings (D-SC)	November 9, 1966	
	1633	William B. Spong, Jr. (D-VA)	December 31, 1966	

The senior senators by class were Harry F. Byrd Sr. (D-Virginia) from Class 1, Richard Russell Jr. (D-Georgia) from Class 2, and Carl Hayden (D-Arizona) from Class 3. Byrd Sr. resigned on November 10, 1965 with Spessard Holland (D-Florida) became the most senior senator from his class.

== See also ==
- 89th United States Congress
- List of United States representatives in the 89th Congress
