= Joe Starnes =

American politician (1895–1962)

- Joe Starnes (L) with Martin Dies and Un-American Committee investigator J.B. Matthews, 1938.

Member of the U.S. House of Representatives from Alabama's 5th district
- In office January 3, 1935 – January 3, 1945
- Preceded by: Miles C. Allgood
- Succeeded by: Albert Rains

Personal details
- Born: March 31, 1895 Guntersville, Alabama, U.S.
- Died: January 9, 1962 (aged 66) Washington, D.C., U.S.
- Party: Democratic
- Education: University of Alabama
- Occupation: Lawyer

Joe Starnes (March 31, 1895 – January 9, 1962) was a U.S. representative from Alabama.

== Early life ==
Joe Starnes was born on March 31, 1895, in Guntersville, Alabama, and attended the public schools.

== Career ==
He taught school in Marshall County, Alabama from 1912 to 1917. During the First World War he served overseas as a second lieutenant in the Fifty-third Infantry, Sixth Division, in 1918 and 1919. He became a member of the One Hundred and Sixty-Seventh Infantry, Alabama National Guard in 1923 and advanced through the ranks to colonel. In 1931, as a Major, he commanded the Alabama National Guard troops who guarded the African American Scottsboro Boys from the mob gathered outside the Jackson County, Alabama Court House while those defendants were on trial for allegedly raping white women Ruby Bates and Victoria Price. He served as member of the State board of education 1933-1949 and became vice chairman in January 1948.

He graduated from the law department of the University of Alabama at Tuscaloosa in 1921. He was admitted to the bar in 1921 and commenced practice at Guntersville, Alabama. Starnes was elected as a Democrat to the Seventy-fourth and to the four succeeding Congresses (January 3, 1935 – January 3, 1945). In 1938 he served on the Dies Committee, precursor to HUAC, and gained notoriety and ridicule for enquiring of Hallie Flanagan whether the English Elizabethan Era playwright Christopher Marlowe and ancient Greek tragedian "Mr. Euripides" were communists. He was an unsuccessful candidate for renomination in 1944. He served as a colonel of Infantry in the European Theater of Operations and in the Army of Occupation from January 4, 1945, until discharged on February 22, 1946, when he resumed the practice of law in Guntersville, Alabama. Starnes was also an active Civitan.

== Death ==
He died in Washington, D.C., January 9, 1962, aged 66, and was interred in City Cemetery, Guntersville, Alabama. The Airport in Guntersville, Alabama is called Joe Starnes Field.

== See also ==
- List of members of the House Un-American Activities Committee

U.S. House of Representatives
Preceded by Miles C. Allgood	Member of the U.S. House of Representatives from Alabama's 5th congressional district 1935–1945	Succeeded by Albert Rains
