= Dennis DeConcini =

American lawyer and politician (born 1937)

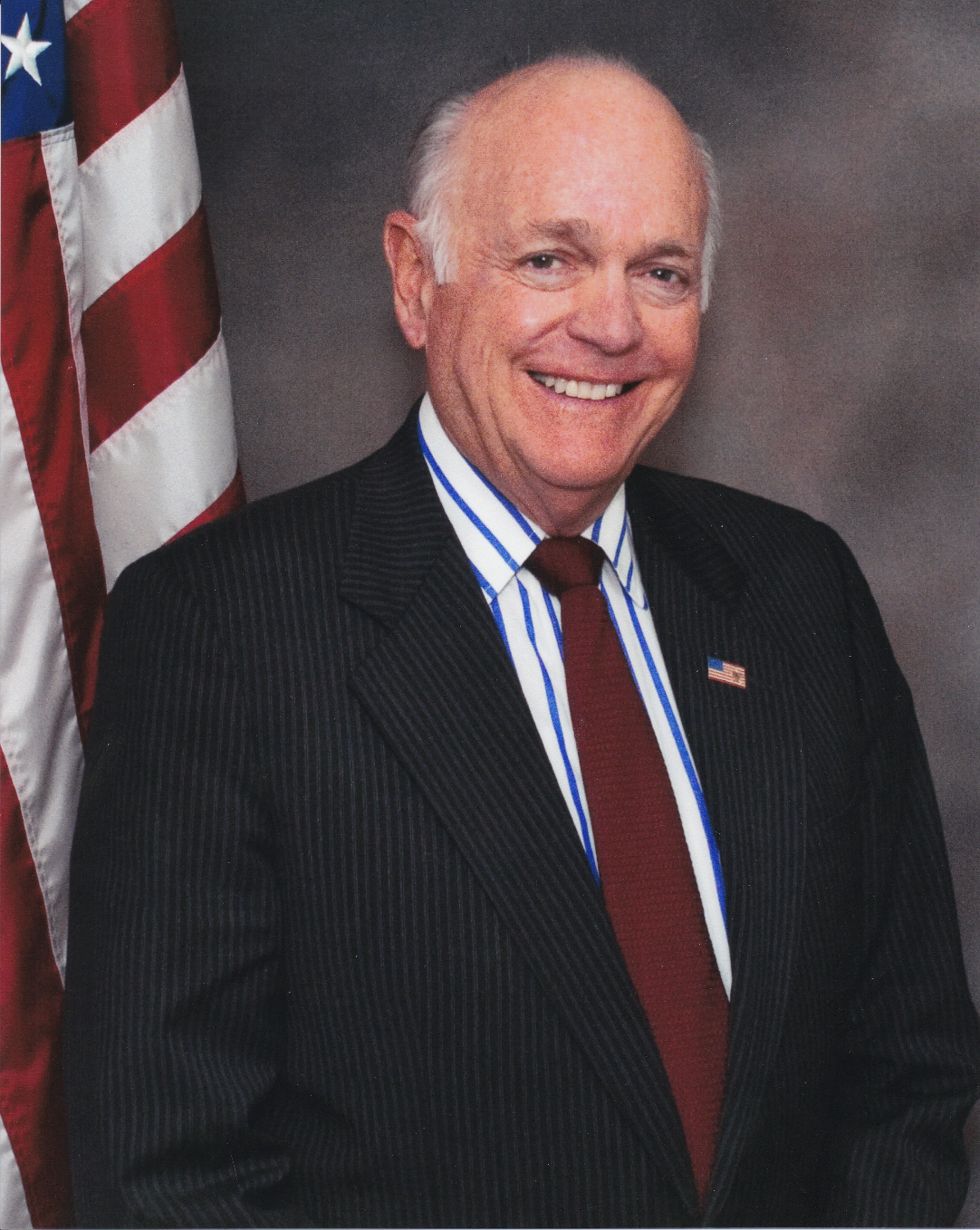

Chair of the Senate Intelligence Committee
- In office January 3, 1993 – January 3, 1995
- Preceded by: David Boren
- Succeeded by: Arlen Specter

United States Senator from Arizona
- In office January 3, 1977 – January 3, 1995
- Preceded by: Paul Fannin
- Succeeded by: Jon Kyl

Personal details
- Born: Dennis Webster DeConcini; May 8, 1937 (age 89) Tucson, Arizona, U.S.
- Party: Democratic
- Spouse: Patty
- Education: University of Arizona (BA, LLB)
- Website: Official website

Military service
- Allegiance: United States
- Branch/service: United States Army
- Years of service: 1959–1960 (active); 1960–1967 (reserve)
- Rank: Army Judge Advocate General's Corps; United States Army Reserve
- Battles/wars: Vietnam War

Dennis Webster DeConcini (/ˌdiːkənˈsiːni/; born May 8, 1937) is an American lawyer, philanthropist, politician and former U.S. senator from Arizona. The son of former Arizona Supreme Court judge Evo Anton DeConcini, he represented Arizona in the Senate as a Democrat from 1977 until 1995. After his re-election in 1988, no Arizona Democrats were elected to the Senate for 30 years until Kyrsten Sinema won his former seat in 2018.

== Early life and education ==
DeConcini was born in Tucson, Arizona, the son of Ora (née Webster) and Evo Anton DeConcini.

His father was judge on the Arizona State Superior Court for 10 years, then served as the Arizona Attorney General for one two-year term from 1948 to 1949 before being appointed to the Arizona State Supreme Court, where he served as a judge for four years, from 1949 to 1953. DeConcini received his bachelor's degree from the University of Arizona in 1959, and his LLB from the University of Arizona in 1963. He then worked as a lawyer for the Arizona Governor's staff from 1965 to 1967. DeConcini attended The JAG School at the University of Virginia and entered U.S. Army JAG Corps.

Dennis DeConcini rejoined the law firm of DeConcini McDonald Yetwin and Lacy, which he and his father had co-founded in 1968, after leaving the Senate in 1995.

He is a member of the advisory council of the Victims of Communism Memorial Foundation.

== Career ==
DeConcini served one elected term as Pima County, Arizona, Attorney (1973–1976), the chief prosecutor and civil attorney for the county and school districts within the county.

He was elected to the U.S. Senate in 1976 as a Democrat, defeated Republican representative Sam Steiger for the open seat left by retiring Republican senator Paul Fannin. DeConcini served three terms in the Senate.

In October 1991, he was one of eleven Democrats who voted to confirm Clarence Thomas to the U.S. Supreme Court in a 52–48 vote.

=== Panama Canal ===
DeConcini sponsored an amendment (the DeConcini Reservation) to the Panama Canal Treaty of 1977 which allows the United States "to take such steps as each [the U.S. or Panama] deems necessary, in accordance with its constitutional processes, including the use of military force in the Republic of Panama, to reopen the Canal or restore the operations of the Canal, as the case may be." The DeConcini amendment, which establishes the use of US military force in Panama, is written and signed by Omar Torrijos in the Instrument of Ratification, but it is alleged that it does not exist. "The DeConcini amendment does not exist, and I maintained that and I continue to maintain it," is what Carlos López Guevara expressed. In the same statement issued by the Ministry of Foreign Affairs, mentioned above by former negotiator Carlos López Guevara, the De Concini Amendment is addressed, arguing that it "was neutralized by the leadership amendment or Church amendment", contained in the Treaty of the Panama Canal. López Guevara spoke about the book "Panama Odyssey" by former US ambassador, William Jorden. "I am going to quote in English what the Senate, President Carter, Undersecretary of State Christopher Warren, Ambassador Jorden and the Panamanian team did, to explain why the Church amendment is the rebellion of a group of liberal senators against the DeConcini amendment," he said. "Why was the Church amendment made?" López Guevara asked himself, before answering by quoting Jorden's book: To disown (page 563), to undo (page 567) to neutralize (page 567). . 571) to balance (page 571), as content move (page 583), etc. "These are the arguments that a Panamanian patriot has to use to say that what the Senate did when approving the Church amendment was to eliminate the interventionist effects of the DeConcini amendment, because in this way, it was "neutralized," said the lawyer. Asked if the fact that the Church amendment is part of the Panama Canal Treaty, which ends next December, is a reason for it not to have effect on the Neutrality Treaty, which does not end on that date, and which has no termination date, López Guevara responded that "it doesn't matter because it is part of that negotiation." "INTERVENTIONIST" PACT.

=== Keating Five ===
DeConcini was widely noted as a member of the Keating Five in a banking and political contribution ethics investigation during the 1980s which grew out of the U.S. Savings and Loan Crisis. The Senate investigation involved Charles Keating and Lincoln Savings/Continental Homes, the sixth largest employer in the state of Arizona at the time. The Senate Ethics Committee looked into the actions of five United States senators in relation to their actions connected with Charles Keating and concluded that Senators DeConcini, McCain, Glenn, and Riegle "broke no laws or Senate ethics rules, but were aggressive in their actions on behalf of Charles Keating." Specifically, DeConcini was judged to have "acted improperly" and did not run for a fourth term.

=== Senate committees ===
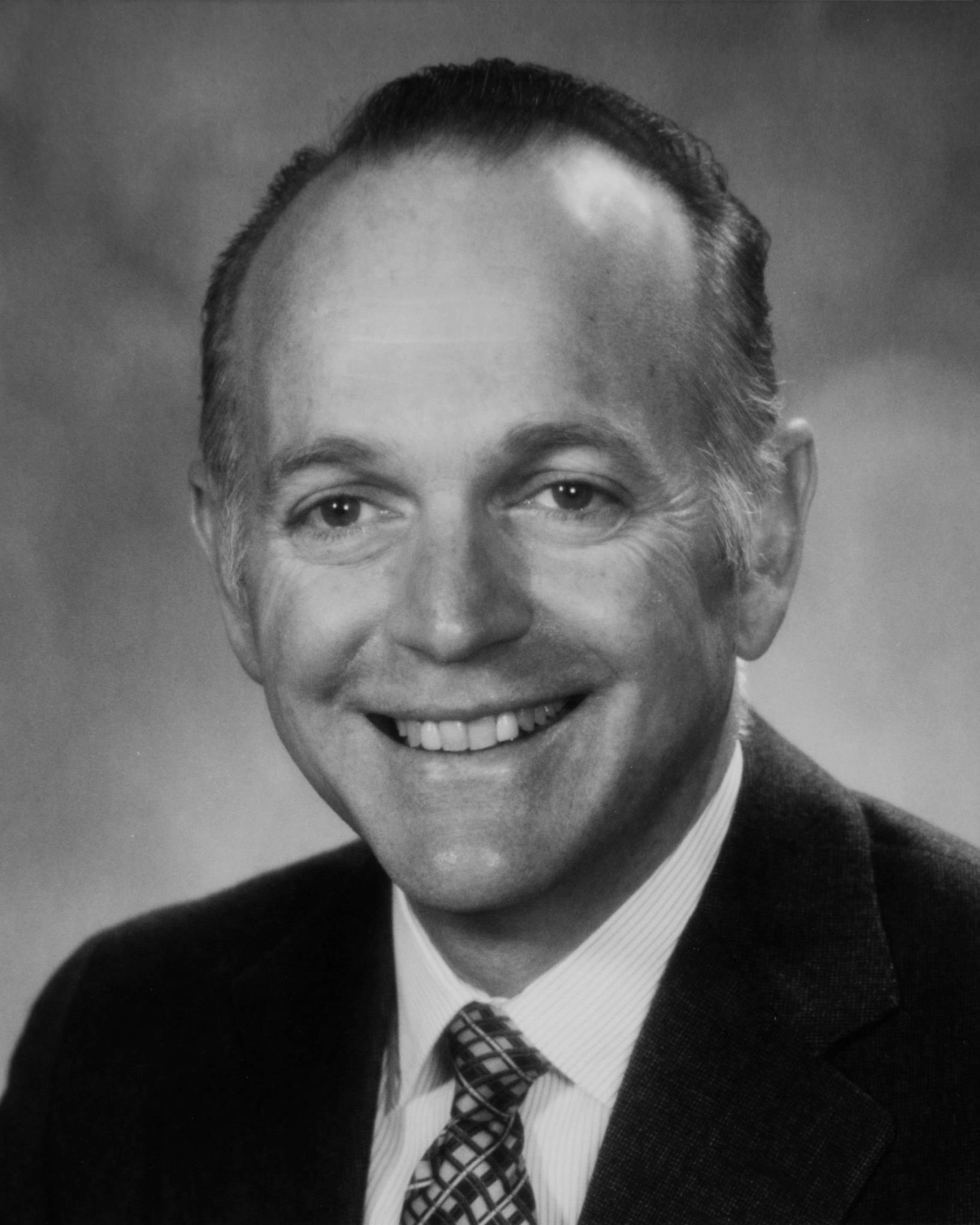
Portrait of U.S. Senator Dennis DeConcini

In the 101st Congress, DeConcini served on the Senate Appropriations Committee, chairing the Subcommittee on Treasury, Postal Service and General Government. He also served on the Subcommittees on Defense, Energy and Water Development and Foreign Operations, and on the Senate Judiciary Committee, chairing the Subcommittee on Patents, Copyrights and Trademarks. He served on the Subcommittees on Antitrust, Monopolies and Business Rights, the Constitution and the Courts.

In 1993 and 1994, DeConcini chaired the Select Intelligence Committee.

=== Appointments ===
In February 1995, DeConcini was appointed by President Bill Clinton to the board of directors of the Federal Home Loan Mortgage Corporation (Freddie Mac), where he served until May 1999.

In 2006, he and former Del E. Webb Construction Company President Anne Mariucci were selected by Governor of Arizona Janet Napolitano to sit on the Arizona Board of Regents.

=== Congressional papers ===
DeConcini's congressional papers are held at the University of Arizona Libraries, Special Collections.

== Business career ==
DeConcini served on the board of directors of the Corrections Corporation of America (now known as CoreCivic) from 2008 to 2014. Starting in 2010, some individuals protested his membership on the board, saying his involvement is "not suitable for a public figure like DeConcini." Although he claims he has not lobbied for harsher immigration laws and sentencing practices, he admits meetings with the Arizona Department of Corrections Director Chuck Ryan and "publicly speaking in favor of" for-profit prisons.

It was alleged that, in 1979, DeConcini had insider knowledge about the proposed route of the Central Arizona Project and that he used this knowledge to purchase land that he resold six years later to the federal government for a gain of almost $1,000,000.

== Philanthropy ==
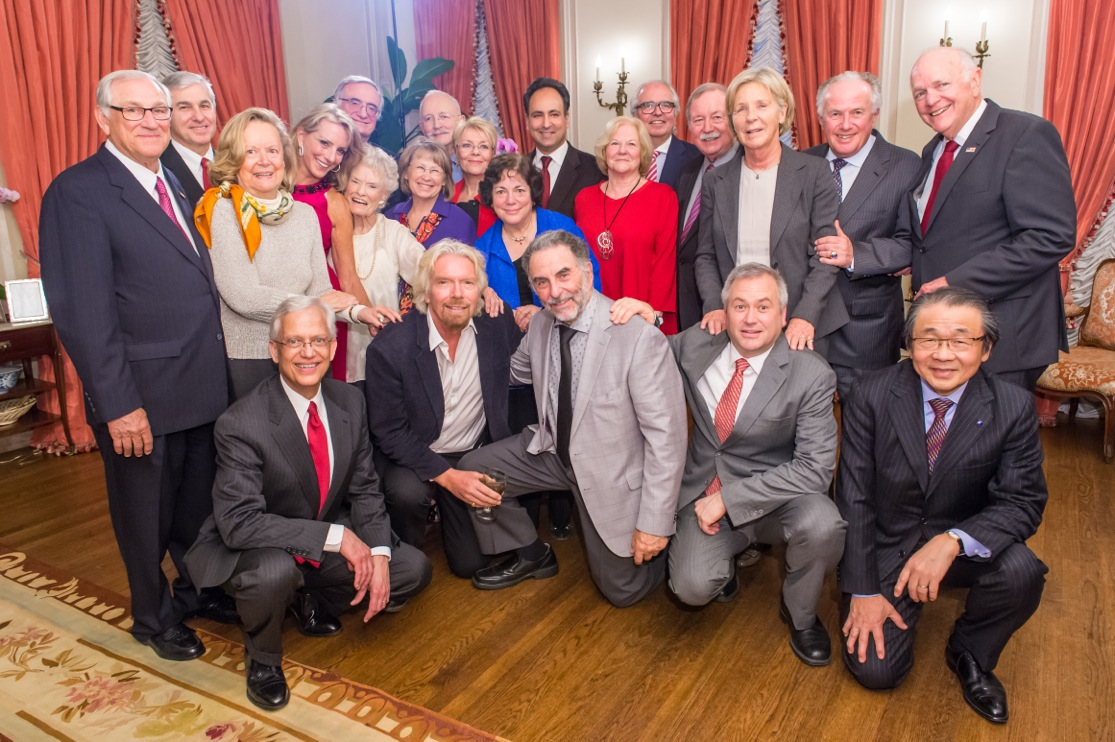
Dennis DeConcini (top row, far right) with the Board of Directors of the International Centre for Missing & Exploited Children.

DeConcini is a member of the board of directors of the International Centre for Missing & Exploited Children (ICMEC), a global nonprofit organization that combats child sexual exploitation, child pornography, and child abduction.

== Book ==
- Senator Dennis DeConcini: From the Center of the Aisle by Dennis DeConcini & Jack L. August Jr., (University of Arizona Press February 1, 2006); ISBN 978-0-8165-2569-0

Party political offices
Preceded by Sam Grossman	Democratic nominee for U.S. Senator from Arizona (Class 1); 1976, 1982, 1988	Succeeded by Sam Coppersmith
U.S. Senate
Preceded by Paul Fannin	U.S. Senator (Class 1) from Arizona; 1977–1995; Served alongside: Barry Goldwater, John McCain	Succeeded by Jon Kyl
Preceded by Steny Hoyer	Chair of the Joint Helsinki Commission; 1989–1991	Succeeded by Steny Hoyer
Preceded by Steny Hoyer	Chair of the Joint Helsinki Commission; 1993–1995	Succeeded by Chris Smith
Preceded by David Boren	Chair of the Senate Intelligence Committee; 1993–1995	Succeeded by Arlen Specter
U.S. order of precedence (ceremonial)
Preceded by Jake Garn as Former U.S. Senator	Order of precedence of the United States as Former U.S. Senator	Succeeded by Dan Coats as Former U.S. Senator
