= George F. Senner Jr. =

American politician (1921–2007)

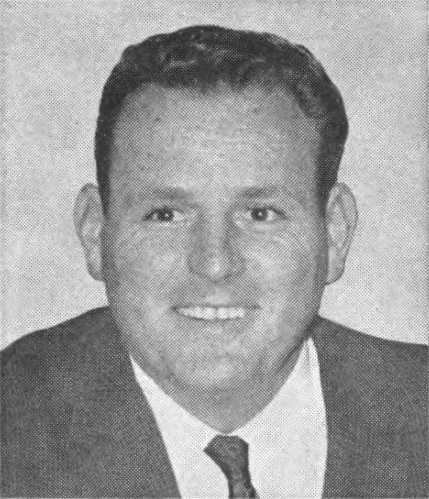

Member of the U.S. House of Representatives from Arizona's 3rd district
- In office January 3, 1963 – January 3, 1967
- Preceded by: District created
- Succeeded by: Sam Steiger

Personal details
- Born: George Frederick Senner Jr. November 24, 1921 Miami, Arizona, U.S.
- Died: October 6, 2007 (aged 85) Sun City, Arizona, U.S.
- Party: Democratic
- Education: University of Arizona

Military service
- Allegiance: United States
- Branch/service: United States Marine Corps
- Years of service: 1942–1945
- Rank: Sergeant

George Frederick Senner Jr. (November 24, 1921 – October 6, 2007) was an American Democratic politician from Arizona.

== Biography ==
Senner was born in Miami, Arizona. He graduated from Miami High School, where he played football and was president of his senior class. Beginning in May 1942, he served with the United States Marine Corps for 27 months in the South Pacific. He was discharged in October 1945 with the rank of sergeant, after which he resumed his education. In 1952 he earned his law degree from the University of Arizona and was admitted to the bar in October of that year.

Returning to Miami, Senner served as an assistant attorney for the city from 1952 to 1954. In 1954, he won election as county attorney for Gila County and served in that office until 1957. In August 1957, he became a member of the Arizona Corporation Commission, and served as its chairman from 1958 until 1961. He was elected as a Democrat to the United States House of Representatives from Arizona in 1962, representing the newly created 3rd congressional district. Senner voted for many key laws while in Congress, such as the Civil Rights Act of 1964, the Social Security Amendments of 1965, which introduced Medicare (United States) and Medicaid, and the Voting Rights Act of 1965. Though he was re-elected in 1964, he was defeated for re-election in 1966 by Republican Sam Steiger.

Upon his defeat, Senner returned to the practice of law. He died on October 6, 2007, in Sun City, Arizona.

== See also ==
- List of members of the House Un-American Activities Committee

U.S. House of Representatives
Preceded by New district	Member of the U.S. House of Representatives from Arizona's 3rd congressional district 1963–1967	Succeeded by Sam Steiger
