= Richard H. Ichord Jr. =

American politician (1926–1992)

Member of the U.S. House of Representatives from Missouri's 8th district
- In office January 3, 1961 – January 3, 1981
- Preceded by: A. S. J. Carnahan
- Succeeded by: R. Wendell Bailey

61st Speaker of the Missouri House of Representatives
- In office 1959–1960
- Preceded by: Roy Hamlin
- Succeeded by: Thomas D. Graham

Member of the Missouri House of Representatives from Texas County
- In office 1952–1960
- Preceded by: Millard T. King

Personal details
- Born: Richard Howard Ichord Jr. June 27, 1926 Licking, Missouri, U.S.
- Died: December 25, 1992 (aged 66) Houston, Missouri, U.S.
- Party: Democratic
- Education: University of Missouri (BS, JD)
- Occupation: Lawyer; politician

Military service
- Branch/service: United States Navy
- Years of service: 1944‍–‍1946
- Battles/wars: World War II

Richard Howard Ichord Jr. (June 27, 1926 – December 25, 1992) was U.S. representative from Missouri and a significant U.S. anti-Communist political figure. A member of the Democratic Party, he served as the last chairman of the House Un-American Activities Committee between 1969 and 1975 (called the House Internal Security Committee since 1969).

== Background ==
Richard H. Ichord Jr. was born in Licking, Missouri. From 1944 to 1946 he served in the United States Navy. He attended the University of Missouri in Columbia, receiving a Bachelor of Science degree in 1949, and a Juris Doctor in 1952.

== Career ==
Ichord worked as a lawyer in private practice before entering government service. From 1952 to 1960, he was a member of the Missouri State House of Representatives, where he served as speaker pro tempore in 1957, and Speaker in 1959.

Elected as the U.S. representative for Missouri's 8th district in 1960, he was re-elected nine times, serving in the Eighty-seventh through Ninety-sixth Congresses (1961–1980). Ichord voted in favor of the Civil Rights Acts of 1964 and 1968, and the Voting Rights Act of 1965. In addition to the House Un-American Activities Committee, he also served on the House Armed Services Committee. He did not run for reelection in 1980.

== Later years ==
After his retirement from office, Ichord became a professional advocate in Missouri and served as co-chairman of American Freedom Coalition with Congressman Bob Wilson.

== Death ==
Ichord died in Houston, Missouri at age 66 on December 25, 1992.

== Works ==
He co-authored the book Behind Every Bush: Treason or Patriotism (1979) with Boyd Upchurch.

== See also ==
- List of members of the House Un-American Activities Committee

U.S. House of Representatives
Preceded by A. S. J. Carnahan	Member of the U.S. House of Representatives from Missouri's 8th congressional district 1961–1981	Succeeded by Wendell Bailey
Political offices
Preceded by Roy Hamlin	Speaker of the Missouri House of Representatives; 1959–1960	Succeeded by Thomas D. Graham
