= 1976 United States Senate election in Arizona =

- November 2, 1976
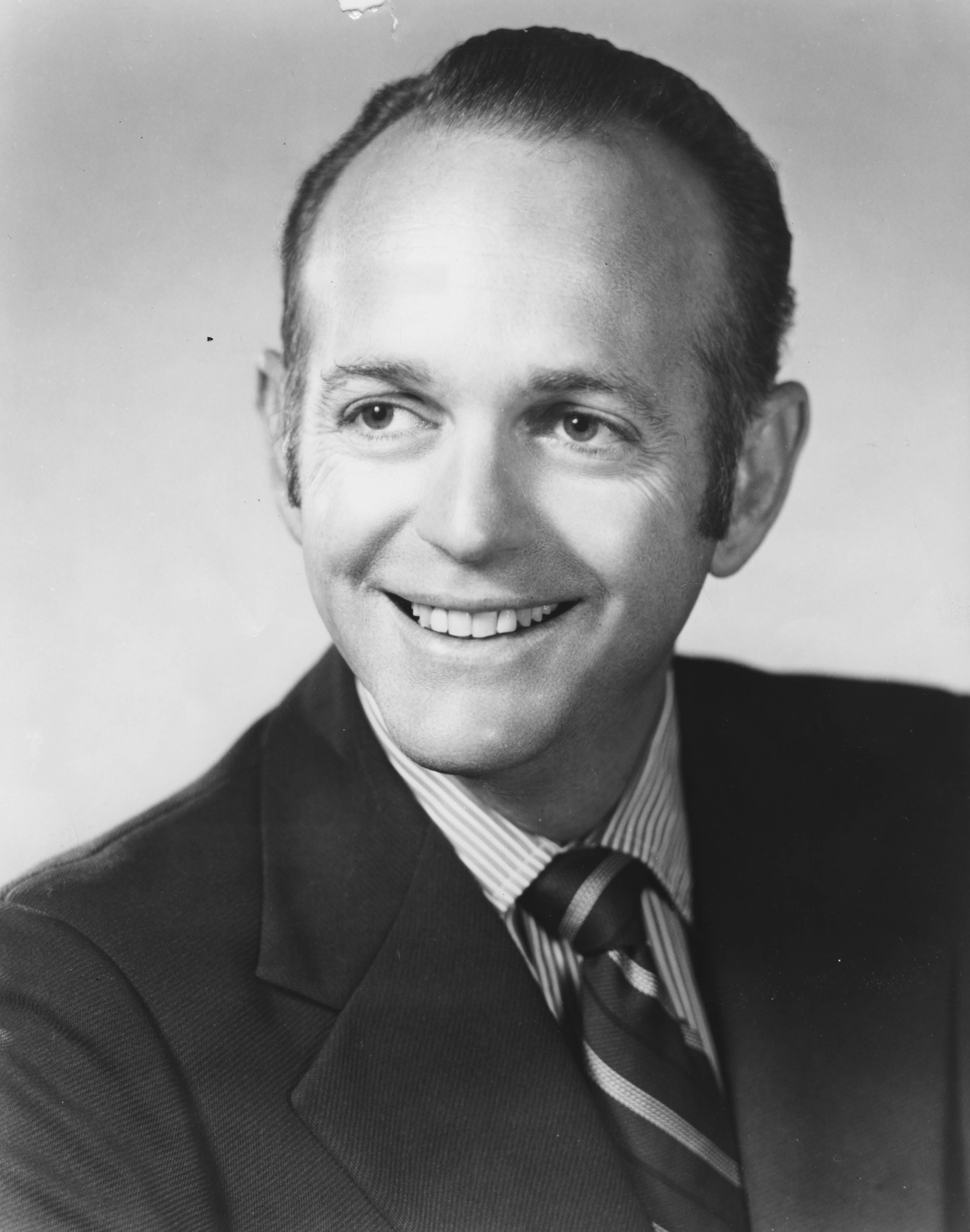

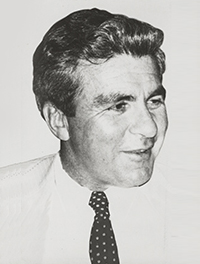
| Nominee | Dennis DeConcini | Sam Steiger |
| Party | Democratic | Republican |
| Popular vote | 400,334 | 321,236 |
| Percentage | 54.01% | 43.34% |
- County results DeConcini: 40–50% 50–60% 60–70% 70–80% Steiger: 40–50% 50–60%
U.S. senator before election
Paul Fannin
Republican
Elected U.S. Senator
Dennis DeConcini
Democratic

The 1976 United States Senate election in Arizona took place on November 2, 1976. Incumbent Republican senator Paul Fannin decided to retire instead of seeking a third term. Democrat Dennis DeConcini won the open seat even as incumbent Republican President Gerald Ford won the state for election on the same ballot.

== Major candidates ==
=== Democratic ===
- Dennis DeConcini, Pima County Attorney and businessman
- Carolyn Warner, Arizona Superintendent of Public Instruction
- Wade Church, former Attorney General of Arizona

=== Republican ===
- Sam Steiger, U.S. Representative from Prescott
- John Bertrand Conlan, U.S. Representative from Phoenix

== Results ==
General election results
| Party | Candidate | Votes | % |
|---|---|---|---|
| Democratic | Dennis DeConcini | 400,334 | 54.01% |
| Republican | Sam Steiger | 321,236 | 43.34% |
| Independent | Bob Field | 10,765 | 1.45% |
| Libertarian | Allan Norwitz | 7,310 | 0.99% |
| Independent | Wm. Mathews Feighan | 1,565 | 0.21% |
| Majority | | 79,098 | 8.68% |
| Turnout | | 741,210 | |
| Democratic gain from Republican | | | |

== See also ==
- 1976 United States Senate elections
