= List of business schools in the United States =

The following is a list of business schools in the United States. Business schools are listed in alphabetical order by state, then name. Schools named after people are alphabetized by last name. Accreditation bodies for business schools in the United States include Association to Advance Collegiate Schools of Business (AACSB), Accreditation Council for Business Schools and Programs (ACBSP), and International Assembly for Collegiate Business Education (IACBE).

== List ==
State	School	College	City	Recognition	Founded
Alabama	College of Business and Public Affairs	Alabama A&M University	Huntsville	Yes	
Alabama	Culverhouse College of Business	University of Alabama	Tuscaloosa	Yes	1919 – undergrad /1924 – graduate
Alabama	Collat School of Business	University of Alabama at Birmingham	Birmingham	Yes	
Alabama	College of Business Administration	University of Alabama in Huntsville	Huntsville	Yes	1950
Alabama	Raymond J. Harbert College of Business	Auburn University	Auburn	Yes	1967
Alabama	Brock School of Business	Samford University	Birmingham	Yes	
Alabama	College of Business	University of North Alabama	Florence	Yes	
Alabama	Stephens College of Business	University of Montevallo	Montevallo	Yes	1896
Alabama	Mitchell College of Business	University of South Alabama	Mobile	Yes	
Alabama	Sorrell College of Business	Troy University	Troy	Yes	
Alaska	College of Business and Public Policy	University of Alaska Anchorage	Anchorage	Yes	1973
Alaska	School of Management	University of Alaska Fairbanks	Fairbanks	Yes	1959
Arizona	W. P. Carey School of Business; Thunderbird School of Global Management	Arizona State University	Tempe, Glendale	Yes	
Arizona	W.A. Franke College of Business	Northern Arizona University	Flagstaff	Yes	
Arizona	Eller College of Management	University of Arizona	Tucson	Yes	
Arkansas	Sam M. Walton College of Business	University of Arkansas	Fayetteville	Yes	
Arkansas	Soderquist College of Business	John Brown University	Siloam Springs	Yes	
California	Jabs School of Business	California Baptist University	Riverside	No	
California	Business School	California Pacific University	Pinole	No	1976
California	Ageno School of Business	Golden Gate University	San Francisco	No	
California	UC Riverside School of Business	University of California, Riverside	Riverside	Yes	
California	George L. Argyros School of Business and Economics	Chapman University	Orange	Yes	
California	Lam Family College of Business	San Francisco State University	San Francisco	Yes	
California	College of Business Administration	California State University, Long Beach	Long Beach	Yes	
California	College of Business Administration	Loyola Marymount University	Los Angeles	Yes	
California	Menlo College School of Business	Menlo College	Atherton	Yes	1927
California	Fowler College of Business	San Diego State University	San Diego	Yes	
California	Crowell School of Business	Biola University	La Mirada	No	
California	Peter F. Drucker and Masatoshi Ito Graduate School of Management	Claremont Graduate University	Claremont	Yes	1971
California	Eberhardt School of Business	University of the Pacific	Stockton	Yes	
California	Fisher Graduate School of International Business	Monterey Institute of International Studies	Monterey	Yes	
California	Graduate School of Management	University of California, Davis	Davis	Yes	
California	Marshall Goldsmith School of Management	Alliant International University	Fresno	No	
California	Graziadio School of Business and Management	Pepperdine University	Malibu	Yes	
California	Haas School of Business	University of California, Berkeley	Berkeley	Yes	
California	Hult International Business School	Hult International Business School	San Francisco	Yes	
California	Leavey School of Business	Santa Clara University	Santa Clara	Yes	
California	Lucas College and School of Business	San Jose State University	San Jose	Yes	
California	Marshall School of Business	University of Southern California	Los Angeles	Yes	1920
California	Paul Merage School of Business	University of California, Irvine	Irvine	Yes	
California	College of Business and Economics	California State University, Northridge	Northridge	Yes	1958
California	College of Business and Economics	California State University, Fullerton	Fullerton	Yes	
California	Orfalea College of Business	California Polytechnic State University, San Luis Obispo	San Luis Obispo	Yes	
California	Rady School of Management	University of California, San Diego	La Jolla	Yes	
California	School of Business	Woodbury University	Burbank	Yes	1884
California	School of Business	Concordia University Irvine	Irvine	No	1976
California	School of Business Administration	University of San Diego	San Diego	Yes	
California	School of Business and Economics	California State University East Bay	Hayward	Yes	
California	School of Business and Management	Azusa Pacific University	Azusa	Yes	
California	School of Business and Management	University of San Francisco	San Francisco	Yes	
California	Martin V. Smith School of Business & Economics	California State University, Channel Islands	Camarillo	Yes	
California	Stanford Graduate School of Business	Stanford University	Stanford	Yes	1925
California	School of Business and Management	Simpson University	Redding	Yes	
California	UCLA Anderson School of Management	University of California, Los Angeles	Los Angeles	Yes	
Colorado	College of Business	Colorado State University	Fort Collins	Yes	
Colorado	Daniels College of Business	University of Denver	Denver	Yes	
Colorado	Leeds School of Business	University of Colorado at Boulder	Boulder	Yes	1906
Colorado	Kenneth W. Monfort College of Business	University of Northern Colorado	Greeley	Yes	
Colorado	University of Colorado Denver Business School	University of Colorado Denver	Denver	Yes	
Connecticut	Ancell School of Business	Western Connecticut State University	Danbury	Yes	
Connecticut	Barney School of Business	University of Hartford	Hartford	Yes	
Connecticut	Charles F. Dolan School of Business	Fairfield University	Fairfield	Yes	
Connecticut	College of Business	University of New Haven	West Haven	No	
Connecticut	Ernest C. Trefz School of Business	University of Bridgeport	Bridgeport	No	
Connecticut	John F. Welch College of Business	Sacred Heart University	Fairfield	Yes	
Connecticut	Lender School of Business	Quinnipiac University	Hamden	Yes	
Connecticut	School of Business	University of Connecticut	Storrs	Yes	
Connecticut	Yale School of Management	Yale University	New Haven	Yes	1976
Delaware	Alfred Lerner College of Business and Economics	University of Delaware	Newark	Yes	
District of Columbia	Busch School of Business	Catholic University of America	Washington, D.C.	Yes	2013
District of Columbia	George Washington School of Business	George Washington University	Washington, D.C.	Yes	
District of Columbia	Howard University School of Business	Howard University	Washington, D.C.	Yes	
District of Columbia	Kogod School of Business	American University	Washington, D.C.	Yes	
District of Columbia	McDonough School of Business	Georgetown University	Washington, D.C.	Yes	1957
District of Columbia	Quantic School of Business and Technology	Quantic School of Business and Technology	Washington, D.C.	No	2016
Florida	Andreas School of Business	Barry University	Miami Shores	Yes	
Florida	Business programs (enrollment moratorium, 2014-)	Carlos Albizu University	Miami	No	
Florida	Coggin College of Business	University of North Florida	Jacksonville	Yes	
Florida	David B. O'Maley College of Business	Embry-Riddle Aeronautical University	Daytona Beach	No	
Florida	College of Business	Florida State University	Tallahassee	Yes	
Florida	Kate Tiedemann College of Business	University of South Florida	St. Petersburg	Yes	
Florida	College of Business Administration	Florida International University	Miami	Yes	
Florida	College of Business Administration	University of Central Florida	Orlando	Yes	
Florida	College of Business and Management	Lynn University	Boca Raton	No (IACBE)	
Florida	Crummer Graduate School of Business	Rollins College	Winter Park	Yes	
Florida	John H. Sykes College of Business	University of Tampa	Tampa	Yes	
Florida	H. Wayne Huizenga School of Business and Entrepreneurship	Nova Southeastern University	Davie	No	
Florida	College of Business	Johnson & Wales University	North Miami	No	
Florida	Barry Kaye College of Business	Florida Atlantic University	Boca Raton	Yes	
Florida	Lutgert College of Business	Florida Gulf Coast University	Fort Myers	Yes	
Florida	School of Business Administration	Stetson University	DeLand	Yes	1883
Florida	Miami Herbert Business School	University of Miami	Coral Gables	Yes	
Florida	School of Business and Industry	Florida A&M University	Tallahassee	No	
Florida	Warrington College of Business	University of Florida	Gainesville	Yes	1926
Georgia	Coles College of Business	Kennesaw State University	Kennesaw	Yes	
Georgia	College of Business Administration	Georgia Southern University	Statesboro	Yes	
Georgia	College of Business & Mass Communication	Brenau University	Gainesville	No (ACBSP)	
Georgia	Eugene W. Stetson School of Business and Economics	Mercer University	Macon	Yes	
Georgia	Goizueta Business School	Emory University	Atlanta	Yes	1919
Georgia	J. Mack Robinson College of Business	Georgia State University	Atlanta	Yes	1913
Georgia	J. Whitney Bunting School of Business	Georgia College & State University	Milledgeville	Yes	
Georgia	James M. Hull College of Business	Augusta University	Augusta	Yes	
Georgia	Scheller College of Business	Georgia Institute of Technology	Atlanta	Yes	1912
Georgia	School of Business	Clayton State University	Morrow	Yes	
Georgia	Terry College of Business	University of Georgia	Athens	Yes	1912
Hawaii	Shidler College of Business	University of Hawaiʻi at Mānoa	Honolulu	Yes	
Hawaii	School Of Business & Economics	Atlantic International University	Honolulu	No	
Idaho	College of Business and Economics	Boise State University	Boise	Yes	
Idaho	College of Business	Idaho State University	Pocatello	Yes	
Idaho	College of Business and Economics	University of Idaho	Moscow	Yes	
Illinois	Booth School of Business	University of Chicago	Chicago	Yes	
Illinois	College of Business	Benedictine University	Lisle	No	
Illinois	College of Business	Chicago State University	Chicago	No	
Illinois	College of Business	Illinois State University	Normal	Yes	
Illinois	College of Business	Northern Illinois University	DeKalb	Yes	
Illinois	College of Business Administration (undergraduate)	University of Illinois at Chicago	Chicago	Yes	
Illinois	College of Business and Administration	Southern Illinois University Carbondale	Carbondale	Yes	
Illinois	College of Business and Management	Northeastern Illinois University	Chicago	Yes	
Illinois	College of Business and Public Administration	Governors State University	University Park	Yes	
Illinois	Driehaus College of Business and Kellstadt Graduate School of Business	DePaul University	Chicago	Yes	1912
Illinois	Foster College of Business Administration	Bradley University	Peoria	Yes	
Illinois	Gies College of Business	University of Illinois at Urbana–Champaign	Champaign	Yes	
Illinois	Walter E. Heller College of Business Management	Roosevelt University	Chicago	Yes	
Illinois	Keller Graduate School of Management	DeVry University	Naperville, Illinois	Yes	
Illinois	Kellogg School of Management	Northwestern University	Evanston	Yes	
Illinois	Kellstadt Graduate School of Business	DePaul University	Chicago	Yes	
Illinois	Liautaud Graduate School of Business	University of Illinois at Chicago	Chicago	Yes	
Illinois	Lumpkin College of Business and Technology	Eastern Illinois University	Charleston	Yes	
Illinois	Quinlan School of Business	Loyola University Chicago	Chicago	Yes	
Illinois	School of Business	Southern Illinois University Edwardsville	Edwardsville	Yes	
Illinois	School of Business and Nonprofit Management	North Park University	Chicago	Yes	
Illinois	Stuart School of Business	Illinois Institute of Technology	Chicago	Yes	
Illinois	Tabor School of Business	Millikin University	Decatur	No	
Indiana	College of Business Administration	Valparaiso University	Valparaiso	Yes	
Indiana	Richard T. Doermer School of Business and Management Sciences	Indiana University-Purdue University Fort Wayne	Fort Wayne	Yes	
Indiana	Kelley School of Business	Indiana University	Bloomington & Indianapolis	Yes	
Indiana	Daniels School of Business	Purdue University	West Lafayette	Yes	
Indiana	Mendoza College of Business	University of Notre Dame	Notre Dame	Yes	1921
Indiana	Miller College of Business	Ball State University	Muncie	Yes	
Iowa	Iowa Central College Online	Iowa Central Community College	Fort Dodge	No	
Iowa	College of Business & Public Administration	Drake University	Des Moines	Yes	
Iowa	Iowa State College of Business	Iowa State University	Ames	Yes	
Iowa	Department of Business Administration	Maharishi University of Management	Fairfield	No	
Iowa	School of Business	University of Dubuque	Dubuque	No	
Iowa	Tippie College of Business	University of Iowa	Iowa City	Yes	
Iowa	College of Business	University of Northern Iowa	Cedar Falls	Yes	
Kansas	Division of Business and Economics	Benedictine College	Atchison	No	
Kansas	Gladys A. Kelce College of Business	Pittsburg State University	Pittsburg	Yes	1977
Kansas	School of Business	University of Kansas	Lawrence	Yes	
Kansas	School of Business and Technology	Emporia State University	Emporia	Yes	1868
Kansas	W.R. & Yvonne Robbins College of Business and Entrepreneurship	Fort Hays State University	Hays	No	
Kansas	School of Business	University of Saint Mary	Leavenworth	No	
Kansas	School of Business	Washburn University	Topeka	Yes	
Kansas	W. Frank Barton School of Business	Wichita State University	Wichita	Yes	
Kentucky	Dayton School of Business	Asbury University	Wilmore	Yes	
Kentucky	W. Fielding Rubel School of Business	Bellarmine University	Louisville	Yes	1953
Kentucky	College of Business	Northern Kentucky University	Highland Heights	Yes	
Kentucky	College of Business	University of Louisville	Louisville	Yes	
Kentucky	Gatton College of Business and Economics	University of Kentucky	Lexington	Yes	
Kentucky	Arthur J. Bauernfeind College of Business	Murray State University	Murray	Yes	
Louisiana	The Joseph A. Butt, S.J., College of Business	Loyola University New Orleans	New Orleans	Yes	
Louisiana	College of Business	Louisiana Tech University	Ruston	Yes	
Louisiana	College of Business	Southern University	Baton Rouge	Yes	
Louisiana	Freeman School of Business	Tulane University	New Orleans	Yes	1914
Louisiana	E. J. Ourso College of Business	Louisiana State University	Baton Rouge	Yes	
Louisiana	College of Business Administration	LSU New Orleans	New Orleans	Yes	
Maine	Maine Business School	University of Maine	Orono	Yes	
Maryland	Sellinger School of Business and Management	Loyola University Maryland	Baltimore	Yes	
Maryland	The Earl. G. Graves School of Business & Management	Morgan State University	Baltimore	Yes	
Maryland	Carey Business School	Johns Hopkins University	Baltimore	Yes	2007
Maryland	College of Business and Economics	Towson University	Towson	Yes	
Maryland	Robert G. Merrick School of Business	University of Baltimore	Baltimore	Yes	
Maryland	Robert H. Smith School of Business	University of Maryland, College Park	College Park	Yes	
Maryland	Perdue School of Business	Salisbury University	Salisbury	Yes	1986
Massachusetts	Bentley University McCallum Graduate School of Business	Bentley University	Waltham	Yes	
Massachusetts	Brandeis School of Business and Economics	Brandeis University	Waltham	Yes	
Massachusetts	Carroll School of Management	Boston College	Chestnut Hill	Yes	
Massachusetts	D'Amore-McKim School of Business	Northeastern University	Boston	Yes	
Massachusetts	The Manning School of Business	University of Massachusetts Lowell	Lowell	Yes	
Massachusetts	Girard School of Business and International Commerce	Merrimack College	North Andover	No	
Massachusetts	Graduate School of Business Administration	Northeastern University	Boston	Yes	
Massachusetts	Graduate School of Management	Clark University	Worcester	Yes	
Massachusetts	Harvard Business School	Harvard University	Cambridge	Yes	1912
Massachusetts	Hult International Business School	Hult International Business School	Cambridge	Yes	
Massachusetts	Isenberg School of Management	University of Massachusetts Amherst	Amherst	Yes	
Massachusetts	Charlton College of Business	University of Massachusetts Dartmouth	Dartmouth	Yes	
Massachusetts	MIT Sloan School of Management	Massachusetts Institute of Technology	Cambridge	Yes	1914
Massachusetts	F.W. Olin Graduate School of Business	Babson College	Babson Park	Yes	
Massachusetts	Sawyer Business School	Suffolk University	Boston	Yes	
Massachusetts	School of Business	Western New England University	Springfield	Yes	
Massachusetts	School of Business	Worcester Polytechnic Institute	Worcester	Yes	
Massachusetts	Questrom School of Business	Boston University	Boston	Yes	
Michigan	College of Business	University of Michigan–Dearborn	Dearborn	Yes	
Michigan	College of Business Administration	University of Detroit Mercy	Detroit	Yes	
Michigan	College of General and Technical Business Studies	Cleary University	Howell	No	
Michigan	College of Management and Applied Business Studies	Cleary University	Howell	No	
Michigan	College of Professional and Graduate Business Studies	Cleary University	Howell	No	
Michigan	Davos School of Management	Northwood University	Midland	No	
Michigan	Donald W. Maine College of Business	Davenport University	Grand Rapids	IACBE	
Michigan	Eastern Michigan University College of Business	Eastern Michigan University	Ypsilanti	Yes	1964
Michigan	Eli Broad College of Business	Michigan State University	East Lansing	Yes	
Michigan	Haworth College of Business	Western Michigan University	Kalamazoo	Yes	
Michigan	Ross School of Business	University of Michigan	Ann Arbor	Yes	
Michigan	Mike Ilitch School of Business	Wayne State University	Detroit	Yes	
Michigan	School of Business Administration	Oakland University	Rochester	Yes	
Michigan	School of Management	University of Michigan–Flint	Flint	Yes	
Michigan	Seidman College of Business	Grand Valley State University	Grand Rapids	Yes	
Minnesota	Carlson School of Management	University of Minnesota	Minneapolis	Yes	1919
Minnesota	College of Business	Minnesota State University	Mankato	Yes - AACSB	1957
Minnesota	College of Business	Winona State University	Winona	Yes	
Minnesota	College of Business and Education	Southwest Minnesota State University	Marshall	Yes	
Minnesota	College of Business, Management and Science	Bemidji State University	Bemidji	Yes	
Minnesota	College of Management	Metropolitan State University	Minneapolis	Yes	
Minnesota	College of Business and Innovation	Minnesota State University Moorhead	Moorhead	Yes	
Minnesota	Excel School of Business	Excel College	Plymouth	No	
Minnesota	Hamline School of Business	Hamline University	St. Paul	No	2008
Minnesota	Herberger Business School	St. Cloud State University	St. Cloud	Yes	1976
Minnesota	Labovitz School of Business and Economics	University of Minnesota Duluth	Duluth	Yes	1974
Minnesota	Offatt School of Business	Concordia College	Moorhead	Yes	
Minnesota	Opus College of Business	University of St. Thomas	Minneapolis	Yes	1985
Mississippi	College of Business	Jackson State University	Jackson	Yes	
Mississippi	Mississippi Christian University School of Business	Mississippi Christian University	Clinton	Yes	
Mississippi	School of Business	William Carey University	Hattiesburg	IACEB	1892
Mississippi	College of Business	Mississippi University for Women	Columbus	No	
Mississippi	College of Business	University of Southern Mississippi	Hattiesburg	Yes	
Mississippi	College of Business	Mississippi State University	Starkville	Yes	1915
Mississippi	University of Mississippi School of Business Administration	University of Mississippi	Oxford	Yes	
Missouri	Henry W. Bloch School of Business and Public Administration	University of Missouri-Kansas City	Kansas City	Yes	
Missouri	College of Business Administration	Missouri State University	Springfield	Yes	
Missouri	College of Business Administration	University of Missouri-St. Louis	St. Louis	Yes	
Missouri	John Cook School of Business	Saint Louis University	St. Louis	Yes	
Missouri	Olin Business School	Washington University in St. Louis	St. Louis	Yes	
Missouri	Trulaske College of Business	University of Missouri	Columbia	Yes	1914
Missouri	Business and Information Technology (BIT) Department	Missouri University of Science and Technology	Rolla	Yes	
Montana	Jake Jabs College of Business & Entrepreneurship	Montana State University	Bozeman	Yes	
Montana	School of Business Administration	University of Montana	Missoula	Yes	
Nebraska	College of Business Administration	Creighton University	Omaha	Yes	
Nebraska	College of Business Administration	Bellevue University	Bellevue	Yes	
Nebraska	College of Business Administration	University of Nebraska–Lincoln	Lincoln	Yes	
Nevada	Lee Business School	University of Nevada, Las Vegas	Paradise	Yes	
Nevada	College of Business Administration	University of Nevada, Reno	Reno	Yes	
New Hampshire	School of Business	Southern New Hampshire University	Manchester	No (ACBSP)	1932
New Hampshire	School of Business	Plymouth State University	Plymouth	No (ACBSP)	
New Hampshire	Tuck School of Business	Dartmouth College	Hanover	Yes	1900
New Hampshire	Peter T. Paul College of Business and Economics	University of New Hampshire	Durham	Yes	
New Jersey	Silberman College of Business	Fairleigh Dickinson University	Madison / Florham Park / Teaneck and Hackensack	Yes	
New Jersey	College of Business and Public Administration	Kean University	Union Township	No	
New Jersey	School of Business	Montclair State University	Montclair	Yes	
New Jersey	School of Management	New Jersey Institute of Technology	Newark	Yes	
New Jersey	Norm Brodsky College of Business	Rider University	Lawrenceville	Yes	
New Jersey	William G. Rohrer College of Business	Rowan University	Glassboro	Yes	
New Jersey	Rutgers Business School	Rutgers University	Newark and New Brunswick	Yes	1929
New Jersey	Rutgers School of Business – Camden	Rutgers University	Camden	Yes	1988
New Jersey	School of Business Administration	Saint Peter's University	Jersey City	No	
New Jersey	Stillman School of Business	Seton Hall University	South Orange	Yes	
New Jersey	School of Business	Stevens Institute of Technology	Hoboken	Yes	
New Jersey	School of Business	Stockton University	Galloway	No	
New Jersey	School of Business	The College of New Jersey	Ewing	Yes	
New Jersey	Christos M. Cotsakos College of Business	William Paterson University of New Jersey	Yes	Yes	
New Mexico	Anderson School of Management	University of New Mexico	Albuquerque	Yes	
New York	College of Business Administration (undergraduate)	Fordham University	New York City	Yes	
New York	College of Management	Long Island University C.W. Post Campus	Brookville	Yes	
New York	Columbia Business School	Columbia University	New York City	Yes	1916
New York	Graduate Business Program	Touro College	New York City	No	
New York	Graduate School of Business Administration	Fordham University	New York City	Yes	
New York	LaPenta School of Business	Iona University	New Rochelle	Yes	
New York	Samuel Curtis Johnson Graduate School of Management	Cornell University	Ithaca	Yes	1946
New York	School of Business	Clarkson University	Potsdam	Yes	1952
New York	King Graduate School of Business	Monroe University	The Bronx	No	
New York	Lally School of Management & Technology	Rensselaer Polytechnic Institute	Troy	Yes	
New York	Lubin School of Business	Pace University	New York City and White Plains	Yes	
New York	E. Philip Saunders College of Business	Rochester Institute of Technology	Henrietta	Yes	
New York	Zicklin School of Business	Baruch College	New York City	Yes	
New York	School of Business	Adelphi University	Garden City	Yes	
New York	School of Business	State University of New York Institute of Technology (SUNYIT)	Utica	Yes	
New York	School of Business, Public Administration and Information Sciences	Long Island University, Brooklyn Campus	Brooklyn	No	
New York	School of Business	Brooklyn College, City University of New York	Brooklyn	No	
New York	School of Management	Binghamton University	Binghamton	Yes	
New York	School of Management	New York Institute of Technology	Old Westbury	No	
New York	School of Management	The State University of New York at Buffalo	Buffalo	Yes	1923
New York	William E. Simon Graduate School of Business Administration	University of Rochester	Rochester	Yes	
New York	Madden School of Business	Le Moyne College	Syracuse	Yes	2012
New York	Stern School of Business	New York University	New York City	Yes	1900
New York	The Peter J. Tobin College of Business	St. John's University	Queens	Yes	
New York	Martin J. Whitman School of Management	Syracuse University	Syracuse	Yes	1919
New York	Frank G. Zarb School of Business	Hofstra University	Hempstead	Yes	
North Carolina	Babcock Graduate School of Management	Wake Forest University	Winston-Salem	Yes	
North Carolina	Belk College of Business	University of North Carolina at Charlotte	Charlotte	Yes	
North Carolina	Bryan School of Business and Economics	University of North Carolina at Greensboro	Greensboro	Yes	
North Carolina	Calloway School of Business and Accountancy (undergraduate)	Wake Forest University	Winston-Salem	Yes	
North Carolina	Cameron School of Business	University of North Carolina at Wilmington	Wilmington	Yes	
North Carolina	Earl N. Philips School of Business	High Point University	High Point	Yes	
North Carolina	Plato S. Wilson School of Commerce	High Point University	High Point	Yes	
North Carolina	Robert L. Tillman School of Business	University of Mount Olive	Mount Olive	No	
North Carolina	College of Business	East Carolina University	Greenville	Yes	
North Carolina	College of Business	University of North Carolina at Pembroke	Pembroke	No; in pursuit	
North Carolina	Poole College of Management	North Carolina State University	Raleigh	Yes	
North Carolina	Fuqua School of Business	Duke University	Durham	Yes	
North Carolina	Kenan-Flagler Business School	University of North Carolina at Chapel Hill	Chapel Hill	Yes	
North Carolina	Martha and Spencer Love School of Business	Elon University	Elon	Yes	1985
North Carolina	Lundy-Fetterman School of Business	Campbell University	Buies Creek	No	
North Carolina	College of Business	Johnson & Wales University	Charlotte	No	
North Carolina	School of Business	North Carolina Central University	Durham	Yes	
North Carolina	SKEMA Business School	Skema Business School	Raleigh	Yes	
North Carolina	College of Business	Western Carolina University	Cullowhee	Yes	
North Dakota	College of Business and Public Administration	University of North Dakota	Grand Forks	Yes	
Ohio	College of Business	Ohio University	Athens	Yes	
Ohio	Carl H. Lindner College of Business	University of Cincinnati	Cincinnati	Yes	
Ohio	College of Business Administration	Bowling Green State University	Bowling Green	Yes	
Ohio	College of Business Administration	Ohio Northern University	Ada	Yes	
Ohio	College of Business Administration	University of Akron	Akron	Yes	
Ohio	College of Business Administration	University of Toledo	Toledo	Yes	
Ohio	College of Business Administration and Graduate School of Management	Kent State University	Kent	Yes	
Ohio	Richard T. Farmer School of Business	Miami University	Oxford	Yes	
Ohio	Fisher College of Business	Ohio State University	Columbus	Yes	
Ohio	Monte Ahuja College of Business	Cleveland State University	Cleveland	Yes	
Ohio	The DeVille School of Business	Walsh University	North Canton	Candidate	
Ohio	Raj Soin College of Business	Wright State University	Dayton	Yes	
Ohio	School of Business Administration	University of Dayton	Dayton	Yes	
Ohio	Warren P. Williamson, Jr. College of Business Administration	Youngstown State University	Youngstown	Yes	
Ohio	Weatherhead School of Management	Case Western Reserve University	Cleveland	Yes	
Ohio	Williams College of Business	Xavier University	Cincinnati	Yes	
Oklahoma	Collins College of Business	The University of Tulsa	Tulsa	Yes	
Oklahoma	Meinders School of Business	Oklahoma City University	Oklahoma City	Yes	
Oklahoma	Michael F. Price College of Business	University of Oklahoma	Norman	Yes	
Oklahoma	School of Business	Oklahoma Baptist University	Shawnee	No	
Oklahoma	School of Business	Oral Roberts University	Tulsa	No	
Oklahoma	William S. Spears School of Business	Oklahoma State University–Stillwater	Stillwater	Yes	
Oklahoma	John Massey School of Business	Southeastern Oklahoma State University	Durant	Yes	
Oregon	Atkinson Graduate School of Management	Willamette University	Salem	Yes	
Oregon	College of Business	Oregon State University	Corvallis	Yes	
Oregon	Charles H. Lundquist College of Business	University of Oregon	Eugene	Yes	
Oregon	Dr. Robert B. Pamplin, Jr. School of Business Administration	University of Portland	Portland	Yes	
Oregon	School of Business Administration	Portland State University	Portland	Yes	
Oregon	School of Management	George Fox University	Newberg	No	
Pennsylvania	Sam and Irene Black School of Business	Pennsylvania State University – Erie, The Behrend College	Erie	Yes	
Pennsylvania	Eberly College of Business and Information Technology	Indiana University of Pennsylvania	Indiana, Pennsylvania	Yes	
Pennsylvania	College of Business Administration (undergraduate)	University of Pittsburgh	Pittsburgh	Yes	
Pennsylvania	Donahue Graduate School of Business	Duquesne University	Pittsburgh	Yes	
Pennsylvania	Fox School of Business	Temple University	Philadelphia	Yes	
Pennsylvania	John L. Grove College of Business	Shippensburg University	Shippensburg	Yes	
Pennsylvania	Haub School of Business	Saint Joseph's University	Philadelphia	Yes	
Pennsylvania	Kania School of Management	University of Scranton	Scranton	Yes	
Pennsylvania	Joseph M. Katz Graduate School of Business	University of Pittsburgh	Pittsburgh	Yes	
Pennsylvania	La Salle School of Business	La Salle University	Philadelphia	Yes	
Pennsylvania	LeBow College of Business	Drexel University	Philadelphia	Yes	
Pennsylvania	College of Business and Economics	Lehigh University	Bethlehem	Yes	
Pennsylvania	A.J. Palumbo School of Business Administration (undergraduate)	Duquesne University	Pittsburgh	Yes	
Pennsylvania	School of Business Administration	Philadelphia University	Philadelphia	No	
Pennsylvania	College of Business and Public Management	West Chester University	West Chester	Yes	
Pennsylvania	School of Business Administration	Widener University	Harrisburg	Yes	
Pennsylvania	Jay S. Sidhu School of Business and Leadership	Wilkes University	Wilkes-Barre	Yes	
Pennsylvania	Sigmund Weis School of Business	Susquehanna University	Selinsgrove	Yes	1982
Pennsylvania	Smeal College of Business	Penn State University	University Park	Yes	
Pennsylvania	Tepper School of Business	Carnegie Mellon University	Pittsburgh	Yes	
Pennsylvania	Villanova School of Business	Villanova University	Villanova	Yes	
Pennsylvania	The Wharton School	University of Pennsylvania	Philadelphia	Yes	1881
Rhode Island	College of Business	Bryant University	Smithfield	Yes	
Rhode Island	College of Business	Johnson & Wales University	Providence	No	
Rhode Island	College of Business Administration	University of Rhode Island	Kingston	Yes	
Rhode Island	Gabelli School of Business	Roger Williams University	Bristol	Yes	
South Carolina	Baker School of Business	The Citadel, The Military College of South Carolina	Charleston	Yes	
South Carolina	College of Business and Behavioral Science	Clemson University	Clemson	Yes	
South Carolina	Moore School of Business	University of South Carolina	Columbia	Yes	
South Carolina	School of Business	Francis Marion University	Florence	Yes	1970
South Carolina	Wall College of Business	Coastal Carolina University	Conway	Yes	
South Dakota	School of Business	University of South Dakota	Vermillion	Yes	
Tennessee	College of Business	Lipscomb University	Nashville	No	
Tennessee	Haslam College of Business	University of Tennessee	Knoxville	Yes	
Tennessee	McAfee School of Business Administration	Union University	Jackson	Yes	
Tennessee	College of Business Administration (undergraduate)	Belmont University	Nashville	Yes	
Tennessee	Jennings A. Jones College of Business (undergraduate and graduate)	Middle Tennessee State University	Murfreesboro	Yes	
Tennessee	College of Business Administration (undergraduate and graduate)	University of Tennessee at Chattanooga	Chattanooga	Yes	
Tennessee	College of Business and Technology	East Tennessee State University	Johnson City	Yes	
Tennessee	Fogelman College of Business and Economics	University of Memphis	Memphis	Yes	
Tennessee	The Jack C. Massey Graduate School of Business	Belmont University	Nashville	Yes	
Tennessee	Owen Graduate School of Management	Vanderbilt University	Nashville	Yes	
Texas	C.T. Bauer College of Business	University of Houston	Houston	Yes	
Texas	College of Business	Angelo State University	San Angelo	Yes	
Texas	College of Business	Prairie View A&M University	Prairie View	Yes	
Texas	College of Business	University of Houston–Clear Lake	Pasadena	Yes	
Texas	College of Business	University of North Texas	Denton	Yes	
Texas	College of Business Administration	University of Texas at Arlington	Arlington	Yes	
Texas	College of Business Administration	University of Texas at El Paso	El Paso	Yes	
Texas	College of Business Administration	University of Texas–Pan American	Edinburg	Yes	
Texas	College of Business - Graduate School of Management	University of Dallas	Irving	Yes	
Texas	College of Business	University of Texas at San Antonio	San Antonio	Yes	
Texas	Cox School of Business	Southern Methodist University	Dallas	Yes	
Texas	Davies College of Business	University of Houston–Downtown	Houston	Yes	
Texas	Bill Greehey School of Business	St. Mary's University	San Antonio	Yes	
Texas	College of Business	Lamar University	Beaumont	Yes	
Texas	Hankamer School of Business	Baylor University	Waco	Yes	
Texas	College of Business	East Texas A&M University	Commerce	Yes	
Texas	Naveen Jindal School of Management	University of Texas at Dallas	Richardson	Yes	
Texas	Jesse H. Jones Graduate School of Management	Rice University	Houston	Yes	
Texas	College of Business	Sam Houston State University	Huntsville, Texas	Yes	
Texas	College of Business	University of Texas Permian Basin	Odessa	Yes	
Texas	Jesse H. Jones School of Business	Texas Southern University	Houston	Yes	
Texas	Bill Munday School of Business	St. Edward's University	Austin	Yes	
Texas	Kelley College of Business	Hardin-Simmons University	Abilene	No	
Texas	Mays Business School	Texas A&M University	College Station	Yes	
Texas	McCombs School of Business	University of Texas at Austin	Austin	Yes	
Texas	McCoy College of Business Administration	Texas State University	San Marcos	Yes	
Texas	Neeley School of Business	Texas Christian University	Fort Worth	Yes	
Texas	College of Business Administration	Abilene Christian University	Abilene	Yes	
Texas	Rawls College of Business	Texas Tech University	Lubbock	Yes	
Texas	School of Business Administration	Texas A&M University–Victoria	Victoria	Yes	
Texas	School of Business Administration and Professional Programs	Texas Wesleyan University	Fort Worth	No	
Texas	College of Business	Texas Woman's University	Denton	No, in pursuit	2017
Texas	Paul and Virginia Engler College of Business	West Texas A&M University	Canyon	Yes	
Utah	Bill & Vieve Gore School of Business	Westminster University	Salt Lake City	No, In Pursuit	
Utah	David Eccles School of Business	University of Utah	Salt Lake City	Yes	
Utah	John B. Goddard School of Business & Economics	Weber State University	Ogden	Yes	
Utah	Jon M. Huntsman School of Business	Utah State University	Logan	Yes	
Utah	Marriott School of Management	Brigham Young University	Provo	Yes	
Utah	Woodbury School of Business	Utah Valley University	Orem	Yes	
Vermont	School of Business Administration	University of Vermont	Burlington	Yes	
Vermont	Norwich University Online	Norwich University	Northfield	Yes	
Virginia	American Sterling University Online Business School	American Sterling University	Sterling	SCHEV	
Virginia	College of Business & Economics	Longwood University	Farmville	Yes	
Virginia	The Williams School of Commerce, Economics and Politics	Washington and Lee University	Lexington	Yes	
Virginia	Harry F. Byrd Jr. School of Business	Shenandoah University	Winchester	Yes	
Virginia	College of Business	University of Mary Washington	Fredericksburg	No; in pursuit	
Virginia	College of Business	James Madison University	Harrisonburg	Yes	
Virginia	School of Business	Liberty University	Lynchburg	No (ACBSP)	
Virginia	College of Business and Public Administration	Old Dominion University	Norfolk	Yes	
Virginia	College of Business	IGlobal University	Annandale	No	
Virginia	Darden School of Business	University of Virginia	Charlottesville	Yes	
Virginia	Joseph W. Luter III College of Business and Leadership	Christopher Newport University	Newport News	Yes	
Virginia	Mason School of Business	College of William & Mary	Williamsburg	Yes	
Virginia	McIntire School of Commerce (undergraduate)	University of Virginia	Charlottesville	Yes	
Virginia	Pamplin College of Business	Virginia Polytechnic Institute and State University	Blacksburg	Yes	
Virginia	E. Claiborne Robins School of Business	University of Richmond	Richmond	Yes	
Virginia	School of Business	Virginia Commonwealth University	Richmond	Yes	
Virginia	School of Business and Economics	University of Lynchburg	Lynchburg	No	
Virginia	School of Management	George Mason University	Fairfax	Yes	
Virginia	College of Business and Economics	Radford University	Radford, Virginia	Yes	
Washington	Albers School of Business and Economics	Seattle University	Seattle	Yes	
Washington	Carson College of Business	Washington State University	Pullman	Yes	
Washington	Michael G. Foster School of Business	University of Washington	Seattle	Yes	1917
Washington	Milgard School of Business	University of Washington Tacoma	Tacoma	Yes	
Washington	School of Business	Pacific Lutheran University	Tacoma	Yes	
Washington	School of Business	Saint Martin's University	Lacey	Yes	
Washington	School of Management	City University of Seattle	Bellevue	No	
West Virginia	College of Business & Economics	West Virginia University	Morgantown	Yes	
West Virginia	Elizabeth McDowell Lewis College of Business	Marshall University	Huntington	Yes	
Wisconsin	College of Business Administration	Marquette University	Milwaukee	Yes	
Wisconsin	College of the Professions	Marian University	Fond du Lac	No	1936
Wisconsin	Sheldon B. Lubar School of Business	University of Wisconsin–Milwaukee	Milwaukee	Yes	
Wisconsin	Wisconsin School of Business	University of Wisconsin–Madison	Madison	Yes	
Wisconsin	College of Business, Economics, and Computing	University of Wisconsin-Parkside	Kenosha	Yes	
Wisconsin	College of Business and Economics	University of Wisconsin–Whitewater	Whitewater	Yes	
Wyoming	College of Business	University of Wyoming	Laramie	Yes	

== See also ==
Lists of business school, other continents

- List of business schools in Africa
- List of business schools in Australia
- List of business schools in Asia
- List of business schools in Europe
