= List of business schools in Texas =

This article is a partial list of business schools in Texas. Business schools are listed in alphabetical order by name. Schools named after people are alphabetized by last name. The AACSB International―The Association to Advance Collegiate Schools of Business is the oldest, largest, and most respected of the accreditation boards for business schools. Membership status of the business schools are included in this list.

School	Parent University	City	AACSB Accreditation
Bauer College of Business	University of Houston	Houston	Yes
College of Business	Angelo State University	San Angelo	Yes
Cameron School of Business	University of St. Thomas (Texas)	Houston	Yes
College of Business	University of Houston–Clear Lake	Pasadena	Yes
College of Business	University of North Texas	Denton	Yes
Carlos Alvarez College of Business	University of Texas at San Antonio	San Antonio	Yes
College of Business Administration	University of Texas at Arlington	Arlington	Yes
College of Business Administration	University of Texas at El Paso	El Paso	Yes
Cox School of Business	Southern Methodist University	Dallas	Yes
Davies College of Business	University of Houston–Downtown	Houston	Yes
Satish & Yasmin Gupta College of Business	University of Dallas	Irving	Yes
Bill Greehey School of Business	St. Mary's University	San Antonio	Yes
Hankamer School of Business	Baylor University	Waco	Yes
Naveen Jindal School of Management	University of Texas at Dallas	Richardson	Yes
Jesse H. Jones Graduate School of Management	Rice University	Houston	Yes
Jesse H. Jones School of Business	Texas Southern University	Houston	Yes
Kelley College of Business	Hardin–Simmons University	Abilene	No
Mays Business School	Texas A&M University	College Station	Yes
McCombs School of Business	University of Texas at Austin	Austin	Yes
Bill Munday School of Business	St. Edward's University	Austin	No
McCoy College of Business	Texas State University	San Marcos	Yes
Neeley School of Business	Texas Christian University	Fort Worth	Yes
Rawls College of Business	Texas Tech University	Lubbock	Yes
School of Business Administration	Texas A&M University–Victoria	Victoria	Yes
College of Business Administration	Abilene Christian University	Abilene	Yes
School of Business Administration and Professional Programs	Texas Wesleyan University	Fort Worth	Yes
Dillard College of Business	Midwestern State University	Wichita Falls	Yes
College of Business Administration	Sam Houston State University	Huntsville	Yes
College of Business	Lamar University	Beaumont	Yes
