= University of Houston (disambiguation) =

The University of Houston is a Carnegie Tier One state research university in Houston, Texas.

The University of Houston may also refer to:

== University of Houston System of college campuses ==
Campuses in the University of Houston System:

- University of Houston
- University of Houston–Downtown
- University of Houston–Clear Lake
- University of Houston–Victoria, a former UH System component institution that is now part of the Texas A&M System

=== Academic campuses ===
- University of Houston Law Center
- University of Houston College of Liberal Arts and Social Sciences
- University of Houston–Downtown College of Sciences and Technology
- University of Houston College of the Arts
- University of Houston College of Medicine

== See also ==
- Houston Cougars, collegiate varsity sports program of the University of Houston main campus
- University of Houston Charter School, charter school in Houston affiliated with the University of Houston
