= Lewis College of Business =

Lewis College of Business may refer to:

- Elizabeth McDowell Lewis College of Business, also known as Lewis College of Business, business school of Marshall University, in Huntington, West Virginia
- Pensole Lewis College of Business and Design, formerly known as Lewis College of Business, private Business and Design HBCU, in Detroit, Michigan
