= Tilli (surname) =

Tilli is a surname. Notable people with the surname include:

- Endre Tilli (1922–1958), Hungarian fencer
- Michelangelo Tilli (1655–1740), Italian physician and botanist
- Stefano Tilli (born 1962), Italian sprinter

== See also ==
- Tillis
