= Fillis =

Fillis is a surname. Notable people with the surname include:

- James Fillis (1834–1913), English-born French riding master
- John Fillis (c. 1724–1792), Canadian merchant and politician

== See also ==
- Gillis (surname)
- Tillis
- Willis (surname)
