= Gurpur =

Gurpur is a surname. Notable people with the surname include:

- Ananth Prabhu Gurpur, Indian cyber security expert
- Shashikala Gurpur (born 1964), Indian author
