= Monfort College of Business =

Business school of University of Northern Colorado

Kenneth W. Monfort College of Business
- Type: Public
- Affiliations: University of Northern Colorado
- Dean: Dr. Sher Gibbs - SherRhonda Gibbs, Dean as of January 2020
- Location: Greeley, Colorado, U.S. 40°24′39″N 104°41′30″W
- Campus: Suburban
- Website: mcb.unco.edu

The Kenneth W. Monfort College of Business (MCB) is a college of the University of Northern Colorado, United States, which offers seven undergraduate business programs and one graduate program. It is accredited by the Association to Advance Collegiate Schools of Business (AACSB), and is the sole business school to receive the Malcolm Baldrige National Quality Award.

== Academics ==
The college offers two undergraduate programs and one graduate program. All students are required to complete the university's "Liberal Arts Core" (LAC), and must complete a professional experience in the real business world. Students at MCB consistently score in the top 5 percent on nationwide standardized exit exams.

=== Undergraduate ===
The primary undergraduate track of the college is the BS in Business Administration. Students can choose an emphasis in Accounting, Computer Information Systems, Finance, Management, Marketing, or General Business. Class sizes are small, with an average of 31 students.

The college also offers a separate Software Engineering track, in collaboration with UNC's College of Natural and Health Sciences. This program prepares students for success in the field of computer software development.

=== Graduate ===
The college offers a Master of Accounting. The program satisfies the 150-hour requirement for licensing as a Certified Public Accountant in Colorado and other states.

The college introduced a Master of Business Administration program in 2014, which offers flexible degree programs for active professionals, or full-time students alike. Classes are held both online and at the University of Northern Colorado main campus in Greeley, CO.

== Student life ==
A variety of extracurricular programs are available to students at MCB, namely:

- Student Council
- Alpha Kappa Psi (Professional Fraternity)
- Beta Alpha Psi (Accounting Society)
- Beta Gamma Sigma (Honor Society)
- Delta Sigma Pi (Professional Fraternity)
- ENACTUS
- Financial Management Association
- Management Club
- Marketing Club
- Student and Foundation Fund (Allows students to invest part of the school's endowment on the New York Stock Exchange)
- Student Center for the Public Trust

MCB also provides students with free online and print access to the Wall Street Journal.

== See also ==
- List of business schools in the United States
