= Christos M. Cotsakos College of Business =

Business school of William Paterson University in New Jersey, US

Coordinates: 40.9681°N 74.2270°W

- Type: Public
- Established: 2001
- Dean: Siamack Shojai, Ph.D.
- Location: Wayne, New Jersey, United States
- Campus: Suburban
- Website: www.wpunj.edu/ccob

The Christos M. Cotsakos College of Business is the business school of William Paterson University, Wayne, New Jersey, United States. The college is accredited in business and accounting by the Association to Advance Collegiate Schools of Business (AACSB). It is one of 14 business schools in New Jersey that are accredited.

The college has six academic departments - Accounting, Finance, Professional Sales, Management, Marketing, and Global Business.

The college has received accreditation from AACSB International – The Association to Advance Collegiate Schools of Business. It is one of 500 business schools worldwide that are accredited by AACSB International.

The E*TRADE Financial Learning Center, one of the few trading rooms found in an academic environment, is the hub of all electronic business information exchange and analysis for the college.

The college is housed in the 1600 Valley Road building. Seminars and forums, such as the Business Leaders’ Symposium, the Finance Symposium, and the Enterprise Case Study Competition are held there.

It was named in May 2001 as the "Christos M. Cotsakos College of Business" in honor of Dr. Christos M. Cotsakos, former E*TRADE CEO and alumnus.

== See also ==
- List of business schools in the United States
