= Rice University Business School =

Business school of Rice University

Coordinates: 29.7175°N 95.4034°W

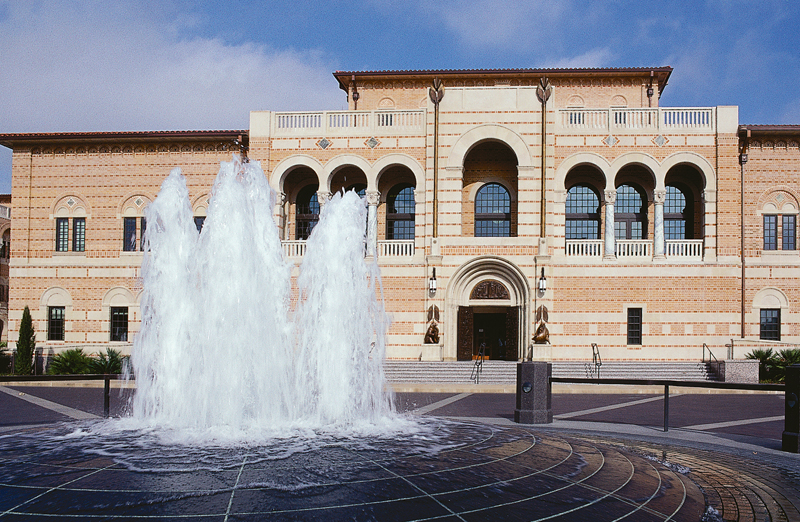
- Type: Private business school
- Established: 1974
- Parent institution: Rice University
- Location: Houston, Texas, United States
- Website: business.rice.edu

The Rice University Business School (branded as Rice Business) is the business school of Rice University in Houston, Texas, United States. It consists of the Jones Graduate School of Business and the Virani Undergraduate School of Business.

Business school rankings

U.S. MBA Rankings
- Bloomberg (2025): 22
- U.S. News & World Report (2026): 29

Global MBA Rankings
- FT (2026): 38

== History ==
In the late 1970s, future U.S. president George H. W. Bush served at the school as an adjunct professor of administrative science. His relationship to the school helped bring the 16th G7 summit to Rice University in 1990.

In 2009, Rice renamed the Jesse H. Jones Graduate School of Management as the Jesse H. Jones Graduate School of Business.

On October 29, 2024, Rice University announced the establishment of the Virani Undergraduate School of Business, following a gift to the university by Farid and Asha Virani.

In 2024, Rice broke ground on a 112,000-square-foot building adjoining McNair Hall.

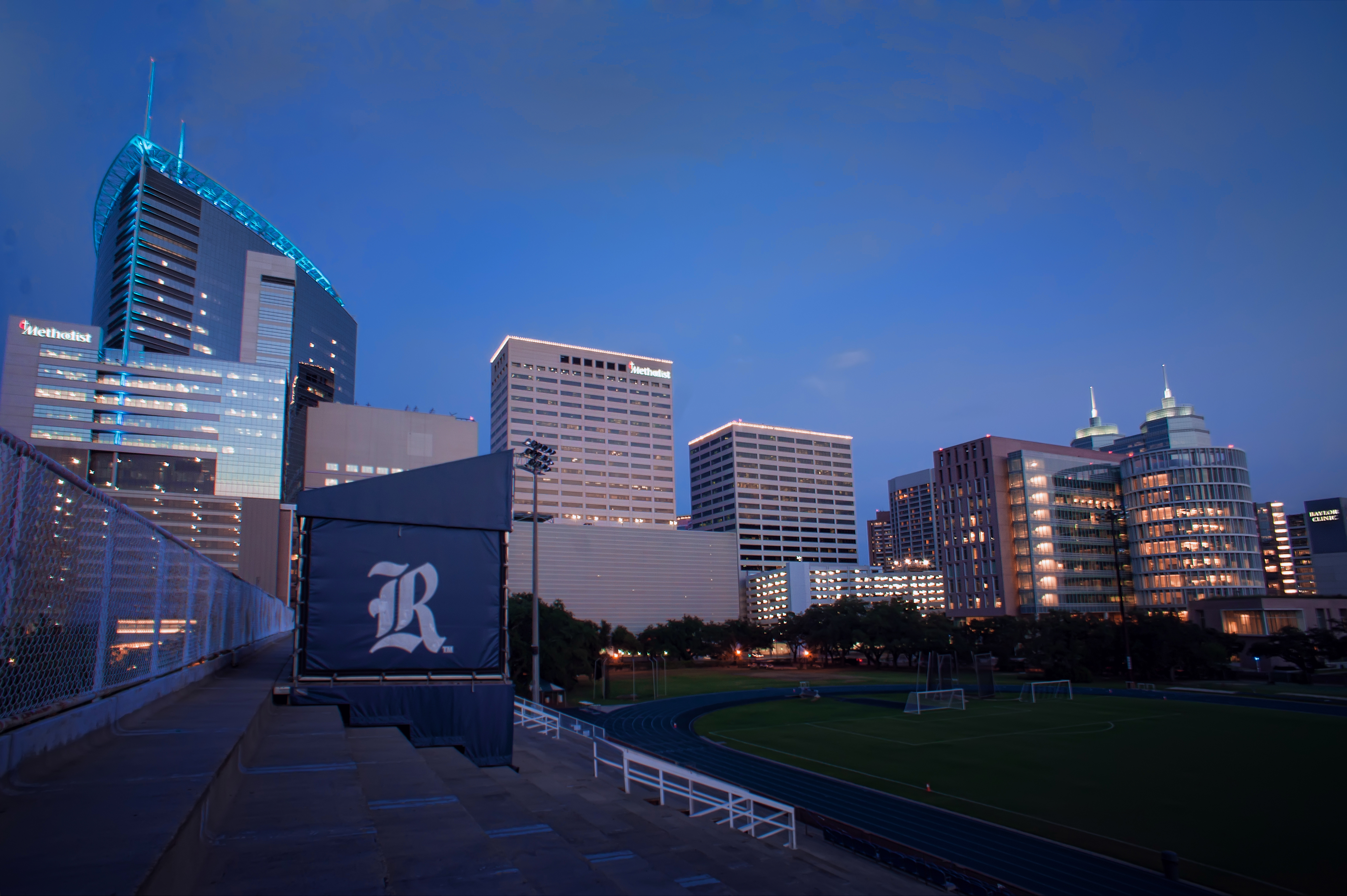
Texas Medical Center skyline

== Rankings ==
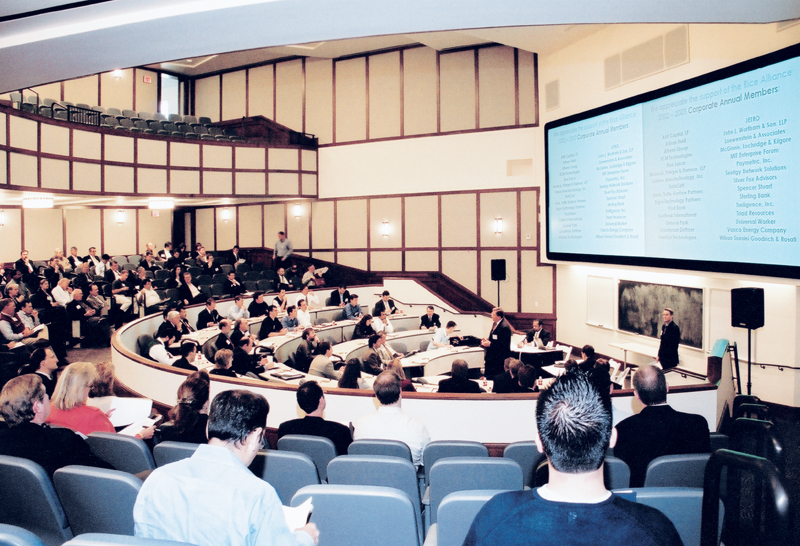
Shell Auditorium in McNair Hall

In the Financial Times 2026 ranking, Rice was listed 38th globally and 16th in the United States.

Rice's graduate entrepreneurship program has been ranked No. 1 by The Princeton Review and Entrepreneur magazine for seven consecutive years (2020-2026). The MBA program was ranked No. 3 best in finance by Princeton Review 2025.

== See also ==
- List of United States business school rankings
- List of business schools in the United States
- List of business schools in Texas
