= Antonio D. Tillis =

American academic administrator and literary scholar

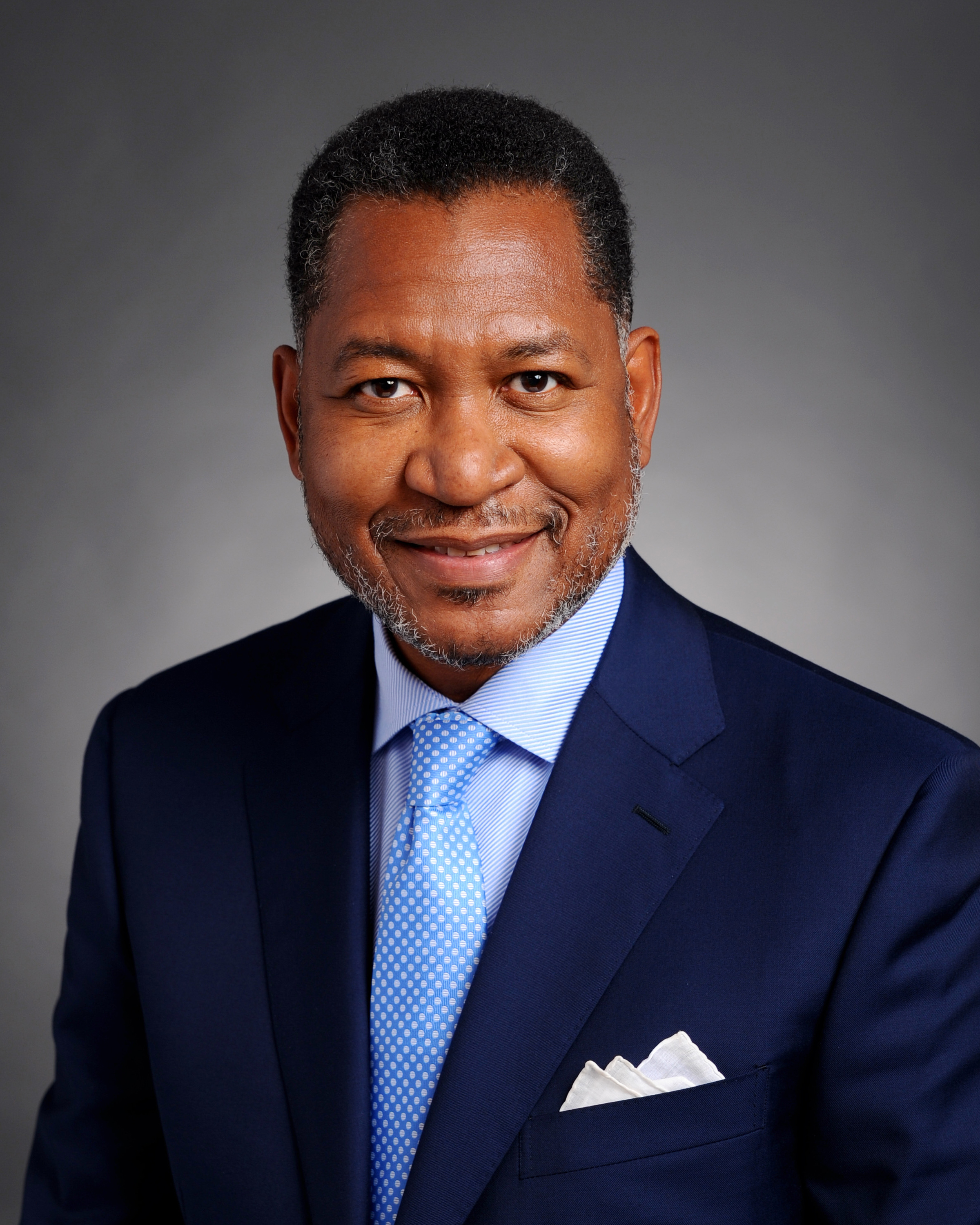
- Born: 1966 (age 59–60)

Academic background
- Education: Vanderbilt University (BS); Howard University (MA); University of Missouri (PhD)

Academic work
- Discipline: African-American studies Latino studies
- Sub-discipline: African-American culture Latin American culture Afro-Latino culture Afro-Latino literature Latin American literature
- Institutions: Dartmouth College; College of Charleston; Purdue University; University of Houston–Downtown; Rutgers University-Camden

Chancellor of Rutgers University–Camden
- Incumbent
- Assumed office July 1, 2021
- Preceded by: Margaret Marsh

President of the University of Houston–Downtown
- Interim
- In office July 2020 – July 2021
- Preceded by: Juan Sánchez Muñoz

Antonio D. Tillis (born 1966) is an American academic administrator currently serving as the chancellor of Rutgers University–Camden. He assumed office on July 1, 2021. A few months later, faculty in the School of Arts and Sciences voted no confidence in him, criticizing Tillis for having "grievously injured the College of Arts and Sciences at Rutgers-Camden" and having "seriously eroded the trust of its faculty in his leadership."

== Education ==
Tillis was born in Memphis, Tennessee, and was the first member of his family to attend college. He earned a Bachelor of Science degree in Spanish from Vanderbilt University, a Master of Arts in Spanish literature from Howard University, and a Ph.D. in Latin American literature from the University of Missouri. He is fluent in both Spanish and Portuguese.

== Career ==
Tillis has contributed articles to several academic publications, including The Afro-Hispanic Reader and Anthology, Callaloo, Hispania, Mosaic: An Interdisciplinary Critical Journal, CA, and Transit Circle. He co-authored The Trayvon Martin in US: An American Tragedy and edited Critical Perspectives on Afro-Latin American Literature. Tillis served as the dean of the School of Languages, Culture & World Affairs at the College of Charleston. He also chair of the Latin American and Latino studies department at Purdue University. He was also the chair of the African and African-American studies department at Dartmouth College.

Tillis joined the University of Houston–Downtown as dean of the College of Liberal Arts and Social Sciences. He was selected by trustees of the University of Houston System to serve as interim president on July 2, 2020. On April 27, 2021, Rutgers University President Jonathan Holloway announced that Tillis would assume the post of chancellor of Rutgers University–Camden on July 1, 2021.

Tillis' research focuses on Hispanism, African-American studies, Latino studies, African-American culture, Latin American culture, Afro-Latino culture and literature, and Latin American literature.

== Rutgers–Camden Chancellorship ==
On April 27, 2021, Rutgers University announced Tillis would become chancellor of Rutgers–Camden effective July 1, succeeding Phoebe Haddon. Rutgers President Jonathan Holloway called Tillis "a brilliant scholar and gifted administrator whose commitment to the transformative power of higher education presents an exceptional opportunity for both Rutgers and New Jersey." However, shortly after his appointment, faculty criticized his leadership style as autocratic, citing poor communication and a pattern of retaliatory behavior.

=== Controversy and no-confidence vote ===
A no-confidence vote arose in the fall of 2021 after the dismissal of Howard Marchitello, dean of the College of Arts and Sciences at Rutgers—Camden.

During a Faculty Senate meeting on November 1, Marchitello said it was possible that his termination was the result of public remarks he had made regarding the "structural and chronic underinvestment" in the Camden Campus. Rebecca Givan, president of the Rutgers AAUP-AFT faculty union, highlighted the university's lack of sufficient investment in the campus, which predominantly serves students from lower-income backgrounds, making them "feel like second-class citizens, and that matters." These circumstances contributed to the occurrence of the 2023 Rutgers University strike.

Marchitello also disclosed that he was instructed by his superiors on multiple occasions to refrain from discussing the pay equity program with faculty, despite his pivotal role in the recommendation process. According to Keith Green, director of Africana Studies at Rutgers-Camden and associate professor of English, the dean's dismissal is reflective of a style of leadership that disregards the concerns and viewpoints of Rutgers-Camden students and faculty.

Tillis responded that the Camden College of Arts and Sciences’ tuition revenue had fallen 20 percent that year due to decreased enrollment under Marchitello's leadership, and that the college suffers from a “lack of new academic programs and concentrations” as compared to local competitor institutions.

Tillis’s statement, however, overlooks the structural funding disparities Rutgers-Camden faces as a campus serving a predominantly low-income and Black student population. Despite faculty and leadership efforts to address pay equity and resource distribution, Camden’s budget constraints limit program development. The lack of new programs stems from institutional barriers, not faculty inaction. By deflecting attention from university policies that restrict Camden’s growth, Tillis unfairly places blame on the college itself.

=== Enrollment Decline ===
Under Tillis' chancellorship, Rutgers’ Camden campus experienced a decline in first-year enrollment of over 30 percent, the largest drop of any university in the country, according to a September 2022 report by the National Student Clearinghouse Research Center. In contrast, the Newark campus experienced a decrease of only 8.2 percent while New Brunswick’s rate increased by 9.9 percent and the overall University’s first-year enrollment increased by 3.3 percent. According to a university report, the campus had a total of 3,928 undergraduates in 2023, down 32% from a seven-year peak of 5,776 in 2018.

=== Criticism of Campus Statements on Israel-Hamas War ===
Tillis has faced significant criticism from members of the Rutgers–Camden community for his public statements regarding the outbreak of the Israel-Hamas war in October 2023. In an open letter to the university, student Feroza Aziz argued that Tillis's initial statement on October 9, which referred to a "shocking and tragic loss of life across Israel and Gaza," failed to specifically acknowledge Palestinian casualties or the historical context of the conflict. The letter characterized the statement as one-sided, arguing it ignored the "tragic suffering of Palestinians" and the "horrors Palestinians have been subjected to since 1948," including references to the Nakba and accusations of apartheid. The criticism centered on the perception that Tillis engaged in selective condemnation, failing to address actions by the Israeli military while condemning Hamas, and that this omission made Palestinian, Muslim, and allied students feel "unheard and unsafe." The controversy highlighted ongoing campus divisions and the challenges of administrative messaging during international crises.

In a subsequent town hall meeting in February 2025, Tillis was asked about student-led calls for the university to divest from Israel. He stated that he had "no say in the matter," explaining that he was not a member of the university's Board of Governors and describing "how academia works as a business," referring to the fiduciary responsibilities of the governing body over endowment investments.
