= University of Houston–Downtown College of Sciences and Technology =

Coordinates: 29.765778°N 95.359116°W

College of Sciences and Technology logo

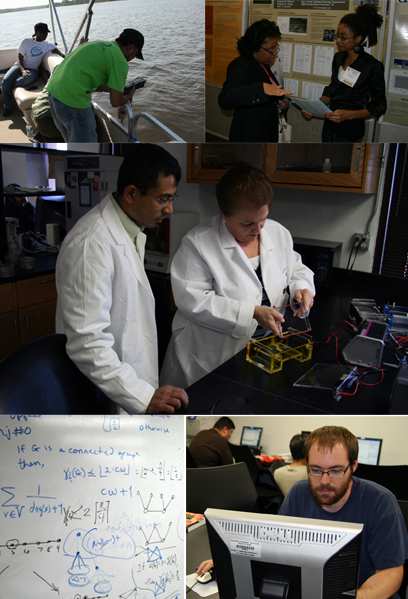
UHD Students at the College of Sciences & Technology

The University of Houston–Downtown: College of Sciences and Technology (CST) is a University of Houston-Downtown program that prepares students for careers or post-graduate study and research in the sciences, technology, mathematics and computer science.

The UHD Scholars Academy (SA) is an academically competitive program within CST for undergraduate students majoring in Science, Technology, Engineering and Mathematics (STEM).

== Departments and Programs ==
MASTER DEGREE

- M.S. in Data Analytics

BACHELOR DEGREES
Department of Computer Science and Engineering and Technology (CSET)

- B.S. in Computer Science
- B.S.E.T. in Control and Instrumentation
- B.A.A.S. in Safety Management
- B.S.E.T. in Structural Analysis and Design

Department of Mathematics and Statistics (MS)

- B.A. in Applied Mathematics
- B.S. in Applied Mathematics
- B.S. in Applied Statistics
- B.S. in Applied Statistics with a concentration in Biostatistics
- B.S. in Applied Statistics with Secondary Mathematics Teacher Certification
- B.S. in Data Science

Department of Natural Sciences (NS)

- B.S. in Biology
- B.S. in Biology with Concentration in Environmental Bioscience
- B.S. in Biology with Concentration in Microbiology
- B.S. in Biology with Concentration in Molecular and Cellular Biosciences
- B.S. in Biological and Physical Sciences
- B.S. in Biological and Physical Sciences with Secondary-level Teacher Certification
- B.S. in Biotechnology
- B.S. in Chemistry
- B.S. in Chemistry with Concentration in Biochemistry
- B.S. in Chemistry with Concentration in Environmental Sciences
- B.S. in Chemistry with Concentration in Forensic Sciences
- B.S. in Chemistry with Concentration in Industrial Chemistry
- B.S. in Geosciences with Concentration in Environmental Geology
- B.S. in Geosciences with Concentration in Geochemistry
- B.S. in Geosciences with Concentration in Petroleum Geotechnology
- B.S. Completion RN to BSN

== Scholars Academy ==
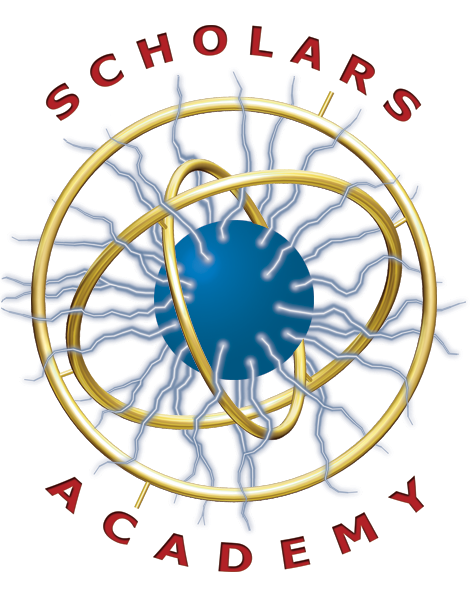
Image: 200 pixels

SAT is made possible by The Brown Foundation, Inc., National Institutes of Health, National Science Foundation, U.S. Army Research Office, U.S. Department of Education, Welch Foundation, and UHD Donors.

Most Scholars are graduates of Houston area high schools; however, many are also international students.

Scholars participate in special extracurricular activities and classes. They enroll in small mathematics and science classes taught by selected full-time faculty . Scholars participate in academic seminars, field trips to STEM-related sites, and research internships.

== Science Research Programs at UHD ==
Each departments have their own research programs.
