= Tillis =

Tillis is a surname. Notable people with the surname include:

- Antonio D. Tillis, American academic administrator
- Darren Tillis (born 1960), American basketball player
- Frederick C. Tillis (1930–2020), American composer
- Iciss Tillis (born 1981), American basketball player
- James Tillis (born 1957), American boxer and actor
- Mel Tillis (1932–2017), American country music singer and songwriter
- Pam Tillis (born 1957), American country music singer and actress, daughter of Mel
- Rick Tillis (born 1963), American politician
- Thom Tillis (born 1960), American politician
