= Palumbo–Donahue School of Business =

Business school of Duquesne University

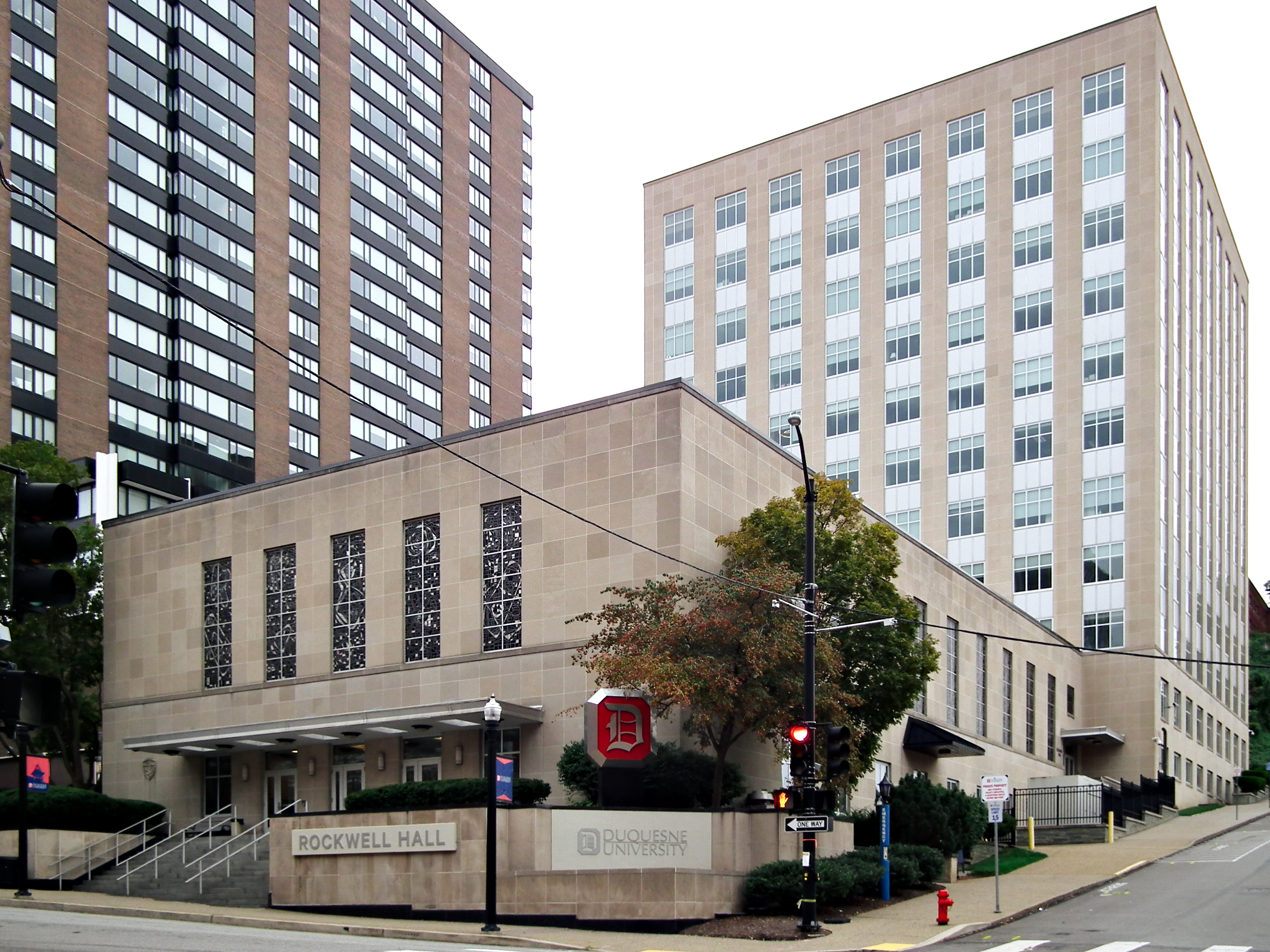
The Palumbo–Donahue School of Business is principally housed in Rockwell Hall, which is located on the corner of Forbes Avenue and Bluff Street on Duquesne's campus

The Palumbo–Donahue School of Business is the business school of Duquesne University in Pittsburgh, Pennsylvania. It comprises the undergraduate A. J. Palumbo School of Business Administration and the John F. Donahue Graduate School of Business. The school has been accredited by the Association to Advance Collegiate Schools of Business since 1962.

== History ==
The school was established in 1913 as the School of Accounts and Finance. It was renamed the School of Business Administration in 1931 to reflect the expansion of its curriculum. The school received accreditation from the Association to Advance Collegiate Schools of Business in 1962.

Following an endowment from businessman Antonio J. Palumbo in 1991, the undergraduate school was named the A. J. Palumbo School of Business Administration. In 1999, the graduate school was named for John F. Donahue, the founder of Federated Investors.

== Academics ==
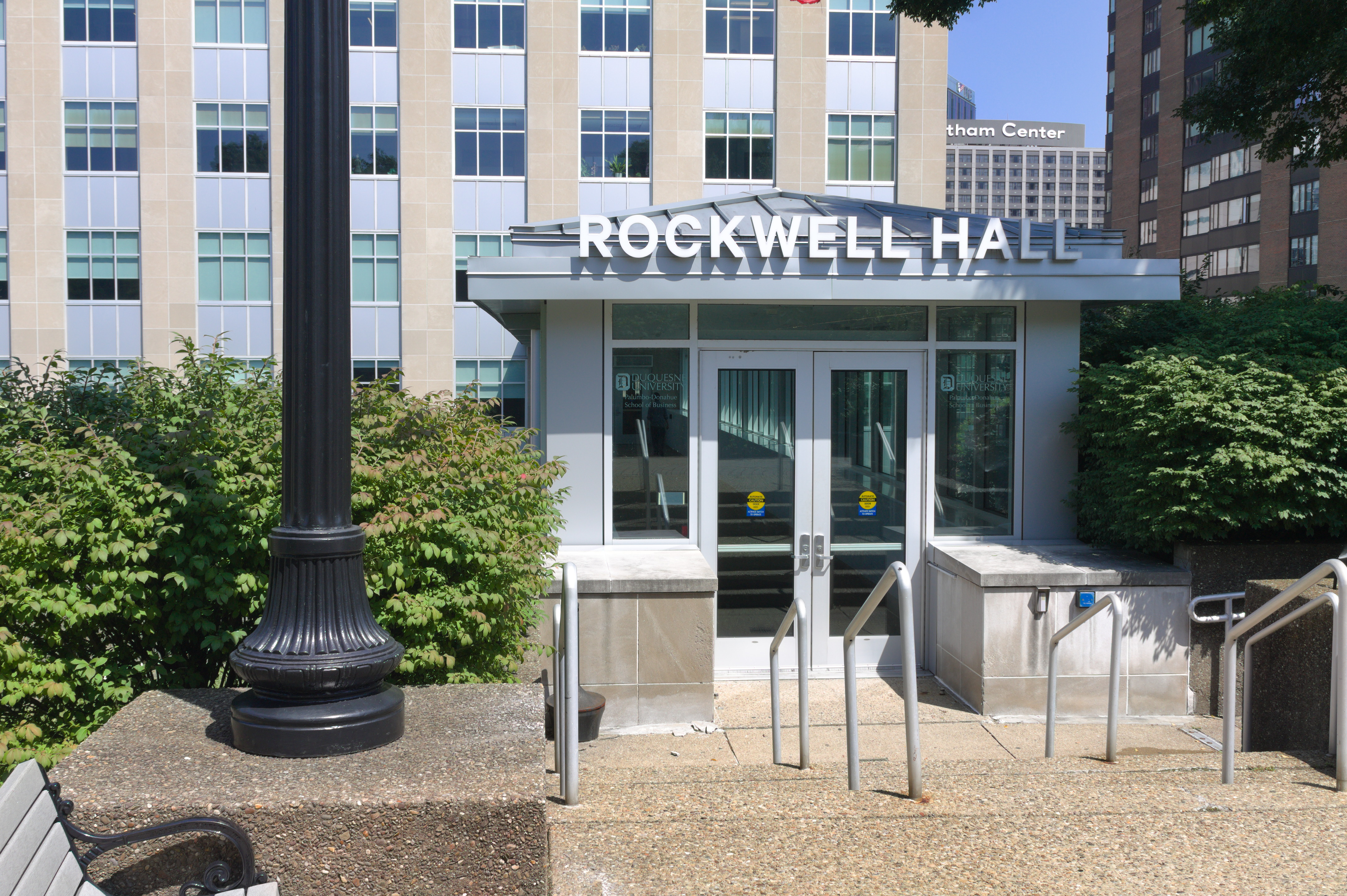
The upper pedestrian bridge entrance to Rockwell Hall

The Palumbo School grants the Bachelor of Science in Business Administration. Its undergraduate majors include accounting, economics, entrepreneurship and innovation, finance, financial planning, general business, information systems and technology, management, marketing, real estate and supply-chain management. Business analytics is offered as a co-major.

The Donahue Graduate School offers a Flex MBA, a one-year MBA and Master of Science degrees in accountancy, analytics and information management, entrepreneurial leadership, finance and supply-chain management. It also offers graduate certificates and joint-degree programs with other schools at Duquesne. The one-year MBA incorporates sustainable business practices throughout its curriculum. In 2020, Corporate Knights ranked Duquesne's MBA fourth worldwide and first among programs in the United States in its Better World MBA ranking.

== Administration ==
The dean of the Palumbo–Donahue School of Business is Dean B. McFarlin, who has held the position since 2013.
