= Ananth Prabhu Gurpur =

Indian author and cyber security expert

Dr Ananth Prabhu Gurpur
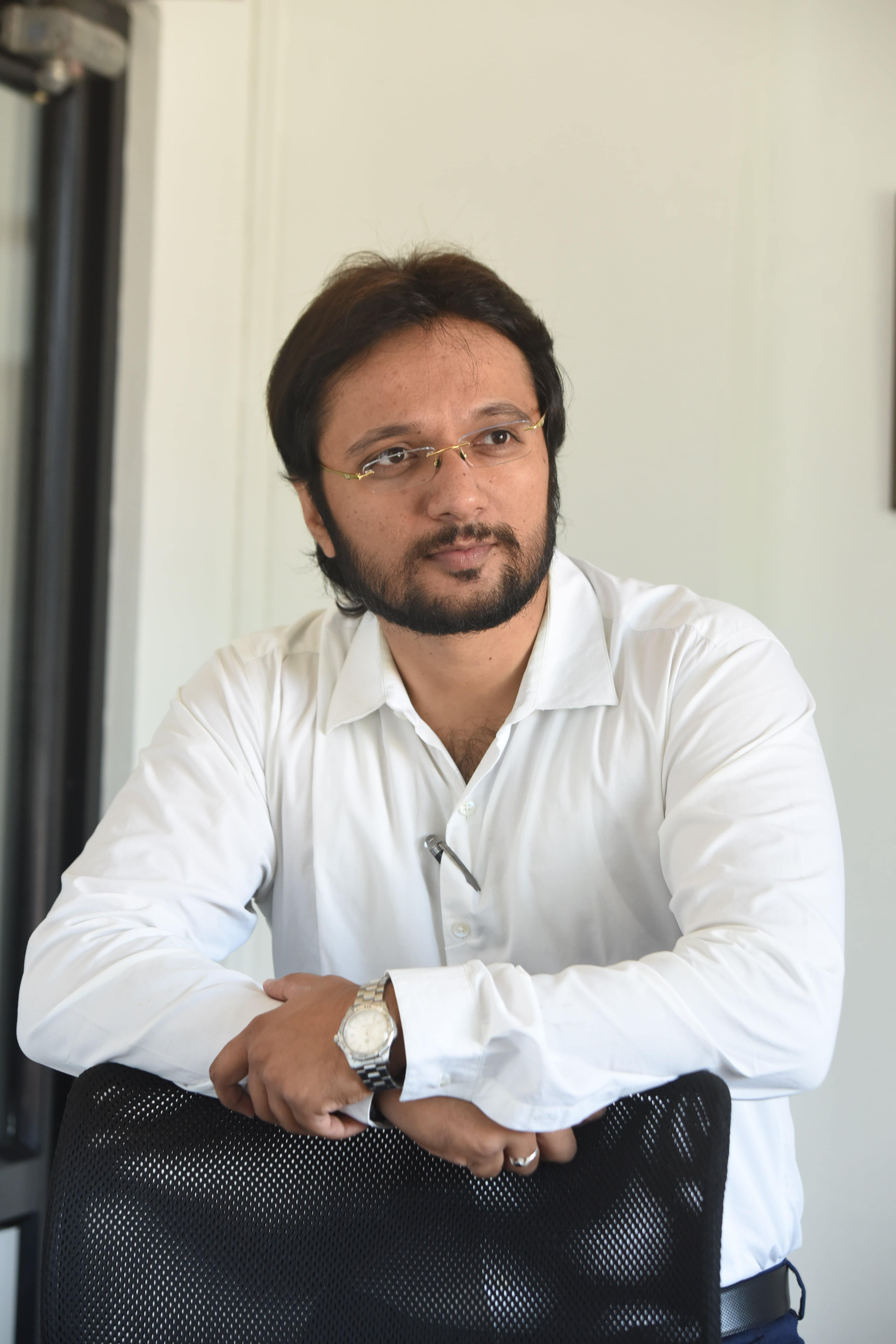
- Born: Mangalore, Karnataka
- Citizenship: India
- Education: Visvesvaraya Technological University (B.S., PhD); University of Houston–Downtown; Manipal Academy of Higher Education (MBA, MTech)
- Occupation: Professor
- Years active: 2009–present
- Organization: Sahyadri College of Engineering
- Known for: Cybersecurity, author, Education
- Awards: Dakshina Kannada District Rajyotsava Award 2020
- Website: Official website

Ananth Prabhu Gurpur also known as Ananth Prabhu G and G. Ananth Prabhu, is a cyber security expert, professor of computer engineering at the Sahyadri College of Engineering and Management and an author. He is also a guest faculty at the Karnataka Police Academy and Karnataka Judicial Academy.

== Early life and education ==
Ananth Prabhu grew up in Mangaluru, a city in Coastal Karnataka. He did his primary schooling at Rosario English Medium School, Mangaluru. He completed his high school and pre-university course at St Aloysius College Mangalore.

He graduated with a bachelor's degree in computer engineering from Visvesvaraya Technological University, Belgaum. He then completed an MBA in information technology and MTech in computer engineering from the Manipal Academy of Higher Education (MAHE, formerly known as Manipal University). He also holds a diploma in cyber law from Government Law College, Mumbai and a PhD (Doctor in Philosophy) in computer engineering from Visvesvaraya Technological University, Belgaum. He further completed his postdoctoral studies at the University of Houston–Downtown, Texas.

== Career ==
Gurpur teaches computer science and engineering at the Sahyadri College of Engineering and Management. He has also taught cybersecurity as a guest faculty at the Karnataka State Police Academy and Karnataka Judicial Academy since 2011. He is the Principal Investigator of the Centre of Excellence in Digital forensics Intelligence and Cyber Security Cell in the Department of Computer Science and Engineering at Sahyadri College of Engineering and Management.

Gurpur designed the "I am Cyber Safe" safety course aimed to raise awareness of people in rural areas about internet safety, that was formally launched by the Home Secretary IGP (Inspector-general of police) D. Roopa in 2020. It is part of a website that includes the third edition of the e-book Cyber Safe Girl, that he created with Vivek Shetty to promote cybersafety for women. As part of the "Cyber Safe Girl" campaign, he also worked with an e-waste management initiative that distributed copies of the book to participants. The first edition of the e-book was released in 2017. A fourth edition was released in 2021.

Gurpur has launched an indigenous no touch IOT sanitiser dispenser. The dispenser connected with Wi-Fi would give real time data on usage and had an IR temperature sensor.

== Commentary ==
In 2020, Prabhu discussed hacking as the "new normal" in response to a bitcoin scam related to compromised Twitter accounts. Prabhu also highlighted and brought notice to fake oximeter apps for COVID-19, as well as matrimonial scams and sextortion schemes on online dating websites. He has also warned about posting close up pictures on social media, including WhatsApp, and has explained several ways to improve individual cybersecurity. He also warned about Saree Challenge photos being made into fake naked images. He also highlighted the EMI deferment fraud in the country and how people who are not very good with English are being scammed.

In 2019, he advocated for cyber security to be included as part of school curriculums, and for cyber laws in India to be updated. He also warned of the dangers of discarded electronics and encouraged safe e-waste management.

== Community and social service ==
Gurpur has been part of other philanthropic initiatives like Ring The Bell in Karnataka (inspired from Kerala). He has served as an advisor to the Vikas Group of Institutions. Gurpur also supported in providing maternity nutrition kit to pregnant women in Dakshina Kannada.

== Academic Publications ==
- Bhandary, Abhir; Prabhu, G. Ananth; Rajinikanth, V.; Thanaraj, K. Palani; Satapathy, Suresh Chandra; Robbins, David E.; Shasky, Charles; Zhang, Yu-Dong; Tavares, João Manuel R.S.; Raja, N. Sri Madhava (January 2020). "Deep-learning framework to detect lung abnormality – A study with chest X-Ray and lung CT scan images". Pattern Recognition Letters. 129: 271–278. Bibcode:2020PaReL.129..271B. doi:10.1016/j.patrec.2019.11.013. hdl:10216/124569. S2CID 209962015.
- Fernandes, Steven Lawrence; Chakraborty, Baisakhi; Gurupur, Varadraj P.; Prabhu G, Ananth (30 June 2016). "Early Skin Cancer Detection Using Computer Aided Diagnosis Techniques". Journal of Integrated Design and Process Science. 20 (1): 33–43. doi:10.3233/jid-2016-0002.
- Sannidhan, M.S.; Ananth Prabhu, G.; Robbins, David E.; Shasky, Charles (December 2019). "Evaluating the performance of face sketch generation using generative adversarial networks". Pattern Recognition Letters. 128: 452–458. Bibcode:2019PaReL.128..452S. doi:10.1016/j.patrec.2019.10.010. S2CID 208609852.
- Varsha, S.; Rajinikanth, V.; Prabhu, G. Ananth (2018). "Gray Scale Image Multi-Thresholding with Chaotic Cuckoo Search". 2018 IEEE International Conference on System, Computation, Automation and Networking (ICSCA). pp. 1–5. doi:10.1109/ICSCAN.2018.8541262. ISBN 978-1-5386-4866-7. S2CID 53752025.
- Kumar, Sunil S; Karanth, Shyam S; Akshay, K C; Prabhu, Ananth; Kumar, Bharathraj M. (March 2012). "Improved Aprori Algorithm Based on bottom up approach using Probability and Matrix". International Journal of Computer Science Issues. 9 (2). Mahebourg: 242–246. ProQuest 1035138270.

One of his papers was part of the Most Cited Pattern Recognition Letters Articles List since 2018.

== Non-Academic Publications ==
In addition to his cybersecurity research and writing, his other works include Little Black Book For Teachers, which he wrote in response to a question asked to him on how to become a good teacher, and was distributed free to teachers following a sponsorship from Krishna J. Palemar, chairman of Vikas Education Trust in 2016. In 2017, I Own the Monk's Ferrari, a self-help book about having the correct work-life balance and including a spiritual search/aspect was released by Yogi Adityanath, Chief Minister of Uttar Pradesh. In 2021, he released Glorious Bharat, about the history of India.

== Bibliography ==
- Little Black Book For Students ISBN 978-93-5407-398-4
- Little Black Book For Teachers ISBN 978-93-5407-722-7
- I Own the Monk's Ferrari ISBN 978-93-5288-365-3
- The Text Message That Killed Me ISBN 978-93-5351-598-0
- Cyber Safe Girl ISBN 978-93-5382-030-5
- Glorious Bharat – Part 1 ISBN 978-93-5406-915-4
- Glorious Bharat – Part 2 ISBN 978-93-5406-973-4
- Glorious Bharat – Part 3 ISBN 978-93-5426-596-9
- The Samurai Who Sold His Suzuki ISBN 978-93-5406-488-3
- My Grandfathers Planchet ISBN 978-93-5407-863-7

== Awards and accolades ==
- Dakshina Kannada District Rajyotsava Award 2020
