= Elizabeth McDowell Lewis College of Business =

Business school of Marshall University

Coordinates: 38.4222°N 82.4342°W

- Former name: Marshall University College of Business (1969-1996)
- Type: Public business school
- Established: 1969
- Affiliations: Marshall University
- Dean: Ben Eng
- Location: Huntington, West Virginia, USA (United States)
- Website: Official website

The Elizabeth McDowell Lewis College of Business, also known as the Lewis College of Business, is the business school of Marshall University, a state university located in Huntington in the U.S. State of West Virginia.

== History ==
The Marshall University College of Business was established as a separate unit of Marshall University in 1969. The college in 1996 the Elizabeth McDowell Lewis College of Business, named after Elizabeth McDowell Lewis, making it the first business school in USA to be named after a woman.

== Academic programs ==
The college offers the following undergraduate, graduate, and doctoral programs:

=== Undergraduate programs ===
==== Bachelor’s Degree Programs ====
- Accounting
- Aviation Management
- Economics
- Entrepreneurship
- Finance
- Health Care Management
- International Business
- Management
- Management Information Systems
- Marketing
- Online General Business
- Sports Business
- Sustainability Management and Technology

==== Minor Programs of Study ====
- Accounting
- Economics
- Entrepreneurship
- Esports Business
- Finance
- General Business
- Health Care Management
- Hospitality and Tourism
- Human Resource Management
- International Business
- Legal Environment
- Management
- Management Information Systems
- Marketing
- Military Science and Leadership
- Sports Business
- Supply Chain Management
- Sustainability and Technology Management

=== Graduate programs ===
The College of Business offers eight master's programs:

- Master of Business Administration
- Master of Business Administration Online
- Master of Science in Accountancy
- Master of Science in Health Informatics
- Master of Science in Health Care Administration
- Master of Science in Human Resource Management
- Master of Science in Information Systems
- Master of Science in Sport Administration

=== Doctoral programs ===
The College of Business offers a Ph.D. in Business Administration, Nurse Anesthesia Practice, and a Doctor of Pharmacy/MBA Joint Degree Program.

== Student organizations ==
The B&E has several student organizations or clubs for students to participate in. Examples include:

- American Marketing Association
- Beta Alpha Psi
- Beta Gamma Sigma
- Collegiate Entrepreneurs’ Organization (CEO's)
- Delta Sigma Pi
- Financial Management Association* Hospitality Club
- Future Business Leaders of America
- Global and Multicultural Student Organization
- Healthcare Executive Leaders of Marshall
- MIS Club
- Omicron Delta Epsilon
- Society for Advancement of Management
- Society for Human Resource Management

== Accreditation ==
The Elizabeth McDowell Lewis College of Business holds accreditation by the Association to Advance Collegiate Schools of Business.
