= Davies College of Business =

Business school of the University of Houston-Downtown

University of Houston–Downtown Marilyn Davies College of Business
- Type: Public
- Established: 1974
- Accreditation: AACSB
- Dean: Jonathan Davis
- Students: 5,532
- Undergraduates: Yes
- Postgraduates: Yes
- Location: Houston, Texas, U.S. 29.769225°N 95.357928°W
- Campus: Urban
- Website: UHD College of Business

The Marilyn Davies College of Business is the business school of the University of Houston–Downtown (UHD), with programs fully accredited by the AACSB International. It is one of four academic units at UHD, and is housed in the 150,000-square-foot (14,000 m^{2}) Shea Street Building.

== Departments and programs ==
The Marilyn Davies College of Business offers an MBA designed for working professionals, enabling them to continue their careers while earning an advanced business education. Additionally, graduate students may pursue a Masters of Security Management, a Masters of Professional Accountancy, and a number of certificates. At the undergraduate level it offers a BBA (Bachelor of Business Administration) degree in nine major areas of studies within four academic departments:

- Accounting & International Business
- Finance, & Management Information Systems
- General Business, Marketing, & Supply Chain Management
- Management & Insurance Risk Management

College allows MBA students to study in 10 different concentrations:

- General Management
- Accounting
- Business Intelligence
- Finance
- Human Resources
- International Business
- Leadership
- Project Management and Process Improvement
- Sales Management and Business Development
- Supply Chain Management

== Centers and Institutes ==
- Risk Management and Insurance Center
