= University of North Texas College of Business =

Business school of the University of North Texas

University of North Texas G. Brint Ryan College of Business
- Type: Public Business school
- Established: 1946
- Parent institution: University of North Texas
- Dean: Marilyn Wiley
- Faculty: 109 (full-time) (Note: 2015–2016 Fact Book, Office of Data, Analytics, & Institutional Research, University of North Texas (2016), pps. 28–29 (enrollment); 147-148 (faculty)) 74 (tenured); 10 (tenure track); 25 (non-tenure track)
- Undergraduates: 5,200
- Postgraduates: 674 85 (post baccalaureate); 514 (MBA / MS); 75 (PhD)
- Location: Denton, Texas; 33.208845°N 97.147663°W
- Campus: Urban
- Colors: Green, White and Black
- Website: www.cob.unt.edu

The University of North Texas College of Business is a constituent college of the University of North Texas in Denton. It is organized into five academic departments — (i) Accounting, (ii) Finance, Insurance, Real Estate & Law (FIREL), (iii) Information Technology & Decision Sciences, (iv) Management, and (v) Marketing & Logistics. The College also has six interdisciplinary centers — (a) the Center for NAFTA Studies, (b) the Information Systems Research Center, (c) the Institute of Petroleum Accounting, (d) the Murphy Center for Entrepreneurship (e) the Professional Leadership Program, and (f) the Center for Logistics Education & Research. The college awards Bachelors, Masters, and Doctor of Philosophy degrees.

== Research centers & professional institute ==
The college is host to three research centers, one applied academics center, and one institute:

1. Center for Decision and Information Technologies is a partnership among the university, industry, and other universities that focus on information technology management, education, and research.
2. Institute of Petroleum Accounting, which was founded 46 years ago.
3. Murphy Center for Entrepreneurship, which is in its twenty-sixth year
4. Center for Logistics Education and Research partners with industry to innovate and structure advanced logistics and supply chains in Texas and around the globe
5. Professional Development Institute is an educational enterprise founded fifty-three years ago within the College of Business and, in December 1982, restructured as a non-profit, tax exempt Texas corporation. A component of its mission is to provide continuing education required for professional certifications such as the CPA. PDI draws upon scholars and adjunct industry practitioners to provide training in subjects that include petroleum accounting, professional accounting, insurance, information systems, finance, and management. As an example of PDI's reach in the past, in 1983, it sponsored 436 programs in 93 cities in 31 states and six countries. PDI was the impetus for erecting a Sheraton hotel and conference center in 1985 through a lease on the site of the university's golf course clubhouse. The university took over the lease from Radisson and demolished the structure in 2009 to make way for a new, larger conference center. As of 2010, CPE courses — which historically have accounted for much of PDI's enrollment — have been offered online.

== Graduate school ==
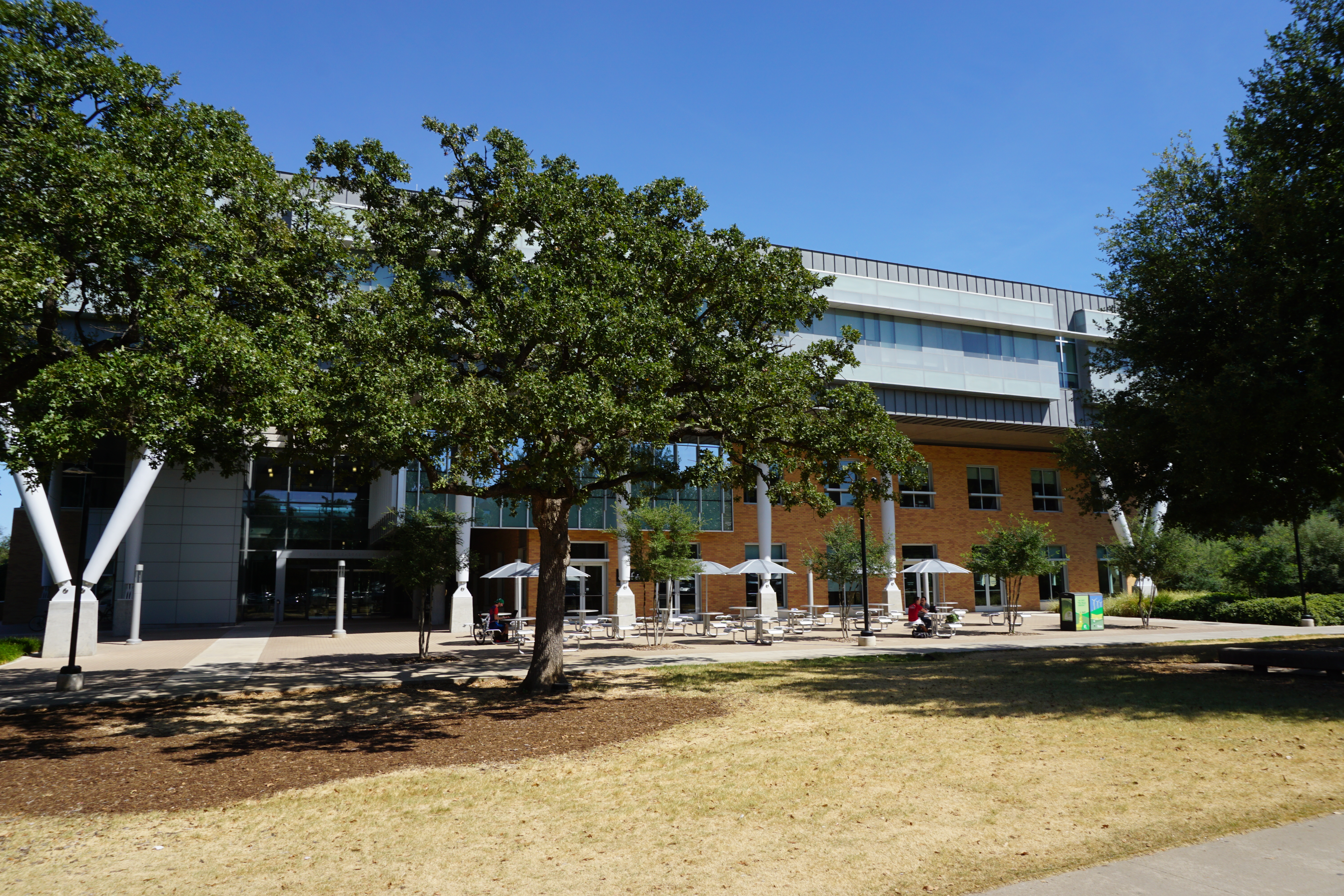
Business Leadership Building

North Texas offers 12 MBA, 7 Master of Science, and 3 joint MBA/MS programs.

== History ==
The college was founded in 1946 (Note: "UNT College of Business, Department of Accounting Reaccredited," UNT News Service, February 18, 2009) as the School of Business Administration. O. J. Curry served as dean from its inception to 1969. The name change, from School of Business Administration to College of Business Administration was approved by the Texas Higher Education Coordinating Board October 1971.

== Deans ==
- College of Business; Enrollment, Fall 2015
	Undergrad	Post; Baccalaureate	MBA; MS	Doctorate	Total
Finance, Real Estate, Insurance & Law	459	9	30	3	501
Marketing & Logistics	511	4			515
Management	292	2		1	295
Business Computer Information Sciences	193	3	33		229
Accounting	424	18	161	1	604
General Business	49	2			51
Business Administration			290		290
Undetermined	1,168	46		70	1,284
Business Integrated Studies	33				33
Pre-Business	2,071	1			2,072
Total	5,200	85	514	75	5,874

Curry; 1946–1969	Othel Jackson Curry (1904–1994), who before coming to North Texas had been a professor at the University of Pennsylvania and its Wharton School of Finance, was named in 1945 as director of the newly formed School of Business. Business education at North Texas began in 1942. Curry had earned a PhD from the University of Michigan in 1941.

Hutton; 1969–1971	Clifford Edwin Hutton (1928–2004) had formerly served on the faculty at the University of Tulsa. Hutton resigned September 1, 1971, to accept a position as Vice President Student Affairs at the University of Tulsa. He had earned a PhD from the University of Texas at Austin in 1961.

King; 1971–1973	Barry Goodwin King (born 1935) stepped-in as acting dean while North Texas conducted a search. He is a scholar in accounting, with particular expertise in internal auditing and control. He had been the director of graduate business studies for North Texas. He holds a PhD in accounting from Ohio State University.

Berkeley; 1973–1983	Marvin Harold Berkeley (1922–2009) was a business management practitioner with applied and research expertise in organizational performance. After stepping down as dean, he continued to teach at the college. He founded UNT's Chief Executives Round Table and served as its director from 1983 to 1993. Berkeley had earned a PhD in psychology from Washington University in St. Louis in 1952.

Hazelton; 1999–2004	Jared Earl Hazelton while serving as dean, created four outreach centers, including the Murphy Enterprise Center, the Center for Logistics Education and Research, the Center for Financial Services, and the NAFTA Studies Center. The College during his tenure also raised $12 million. His academic expertise was in finance markets and public policy. Hazelton earned a PhD in economics from Rice University in 1965.

Cooper; 2005–2007	Kathleen Bell Cooper (born 1945), had served as Under Secretary for Economic Affairs in the U.S. Department of Commerce from 2001 to 2004. She was appointed dean of the college in October 2005, a position she held until August 2007. She has significant academic and applied expertise in the energy sector, particularly in tax policy and international trade. She had served as the Chief Economist of ExxonMobil Corporation. In 2006, while serving as dean of the college, she was appointed to the Board of Directors of Williams Companies, where she currently is chairman of audit committee and member of the finance committee. She earned a PhD in economics from the University of Colorado at Boulder. She had attended UNT as a freshman during the 1963–1964 school year.
Graves; 2008–2015	Oliver Finley Graves joined the UNT faculty in 2002 and served as chair of the college's Accounting Department from that time until January 2007 when he was appointed Senior Associate Dean. Among his professional and multinational academic positions, he served as chair of the Department of German and Russian while on the faculty at the University of Alabama, where he also earned a PhD in accounting. He is Fulbright Scholar to the University of Freiburg, Breisgau, Germany.
Wiley; 2015–current	Marilyn Wiley served as Senior Associate Dean of the College of Business at UNT from 2009 to 2015.

== National and international recognition ==
Logistics & Supply Chain Management

- In 2011, Gartner Research ranked the college's logistics program among the top 23 in North America
- In 2012, International Journal of Physical Distribution & Logistics Management ranked the logistics program top 5 in the world for research productivity
- Transportation Journal ranked the logistics program 22nd globally in terms of research productivity

Accounting Tax

- BYU Accounting Research Rankings, for papers published in tax by PhD candidates:

	Last; 6 years	Last; 12 Years	Last; 20 Years
Tax All Categories	9	22	38
Tax Archival	8	16	24
Tax Experimental	10	25	39

Online graduate business programs

- U.S. News & World Report ranked the North Texas 15th, nationally, in its publication of "Best Online MBA Programs."

== Accreditation ==
The College of Business is accredited in business and accounting by the Association to Advance Collegiate Schools of Business. In 1961, its undergraduate business program received AACSB accreditation. In the spring of 1964, the Master of Business program received AACSB accreditation. At that time, about seventy-five MBA programs in the country and one other in the state — The University of Texas at Austin — was accredited by the AACSB.

Also at that time (1964), the College of Business was second in the state and the southwest, next to the University of Texas at Austin, and 11th in the nation, with the University of Southern California, in number of bachelor's degrees conferred.

The College of Business began its first PhD program sixty-one years ago — in the fall of 1965.

== School supported student organizations ==
The University of North Texas is home to two student lead organizations that receive funding and dedicated rooms from the business school. The first of these being the Professional Leadership Program founded in 1994 with the goal of preparing students for corporate culture and improving the soft skills of the student body. The second of these, the Student Investment Group founded in 2003 with seed money from a donor manages a diversified portfolio of 1.5 million as of 2025 which is a part of the University of North Texas's foundation. The goal being to put students on track for a career in high finance such as investment banking or valuations.
