= University of Houston–Downtown =

Public university in Houston, Texas, US

- Former name: University of Houston–Downtown College (1974–1983)
- Type: Public university
- Established: August 6, 1974; 52 years ago
- Parent institution: University of Houston System
- Accreditation: SACS
- Academic affiliations: CUMU
- Endowment: $49.20 million (FY2024) (UHD only) $1.11 billion (FY2024) (system-wide)
- Budget: $232.0 million (FY2025)
- President: Loren J. Blanchard
- Provost: Deborah E. Bordelon
- Faculty: 760 (Fall 2023)
- Administrative staff: 709 (Fall 2023)
- Students: 14,105 (Fall 2023)
- Undergraduates: 12,880 (Fall 2023)
- Postgraduates: 1,225 (Fall 2023)
- Location: Houston, Texas, United States; 29.765931°N 95.359684°W
- Campus: 40 acres (0.16 km^{2}); Large city
- Colors: Blue and Red
- Nickname: Gators
- Mascot: Ed-U-Gator
- Website: uhd.edu

The University of Houston–Downtown (UHD) is a public university in Houston, Texas, United States. Established in 1974 as University of Houston–Downtown College (UH–DC), it has a campus that spans 40 acres (0.16 km^{2}) in Downtown Houston with a satellite location, UHD–Northwest, inside Lone Star College–University Park. The university is one of three institutions in the University of Houston System.

As of Fall 2023, UHD enrolled 14,105 students in 4 academic colleges and offers 57 degree programs—45 bachelor's and 12 master's. Awarding more than 2,700 degrees annually, the university has more than 67,000 alumni.

== History ==
The University of Houston–Downtown College was established when the University of Houston acquired the assets of South Texas Junior College at One Main Street on August 6, 1974. On April 26, 1983, Senate Bill 235 (SB 235) changed the name of the institution to the University of Houston–Downtown.

The University of Houston–Downtown's expansion continued in the late 1990s. The Willow Street Pump Station was renovated, and the Commerce Street Building opened, providing a new home for the College of Public Service. In the early 2000s, the Shea Street Building opened as the new home for the College of Business.

UHD celebrated a milestone when it enrolled the first class of MBA students in the College of Business. In 2016, a 26,000-square-foot Welcome Center opened its doors, and the O'Kane Gallery landed a new home featuring exhibitions for student, faculty, and local and national artists. Dedicated to the health and wellness of the Campus Community, the Wellness & Success Center opens its doors in January 2023.

== Campus ==
University of Houston–Downtown

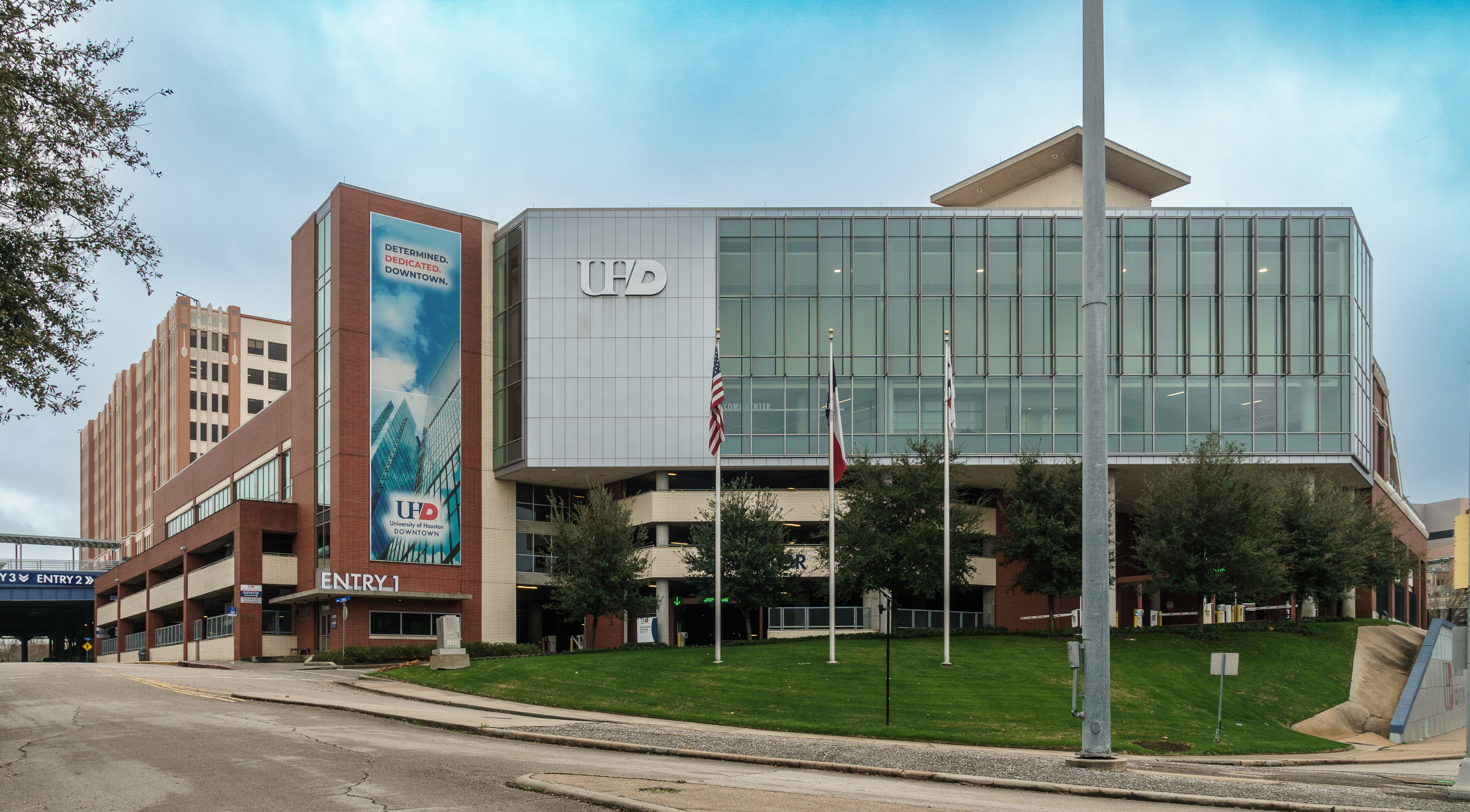
Academic Building on Travis Street

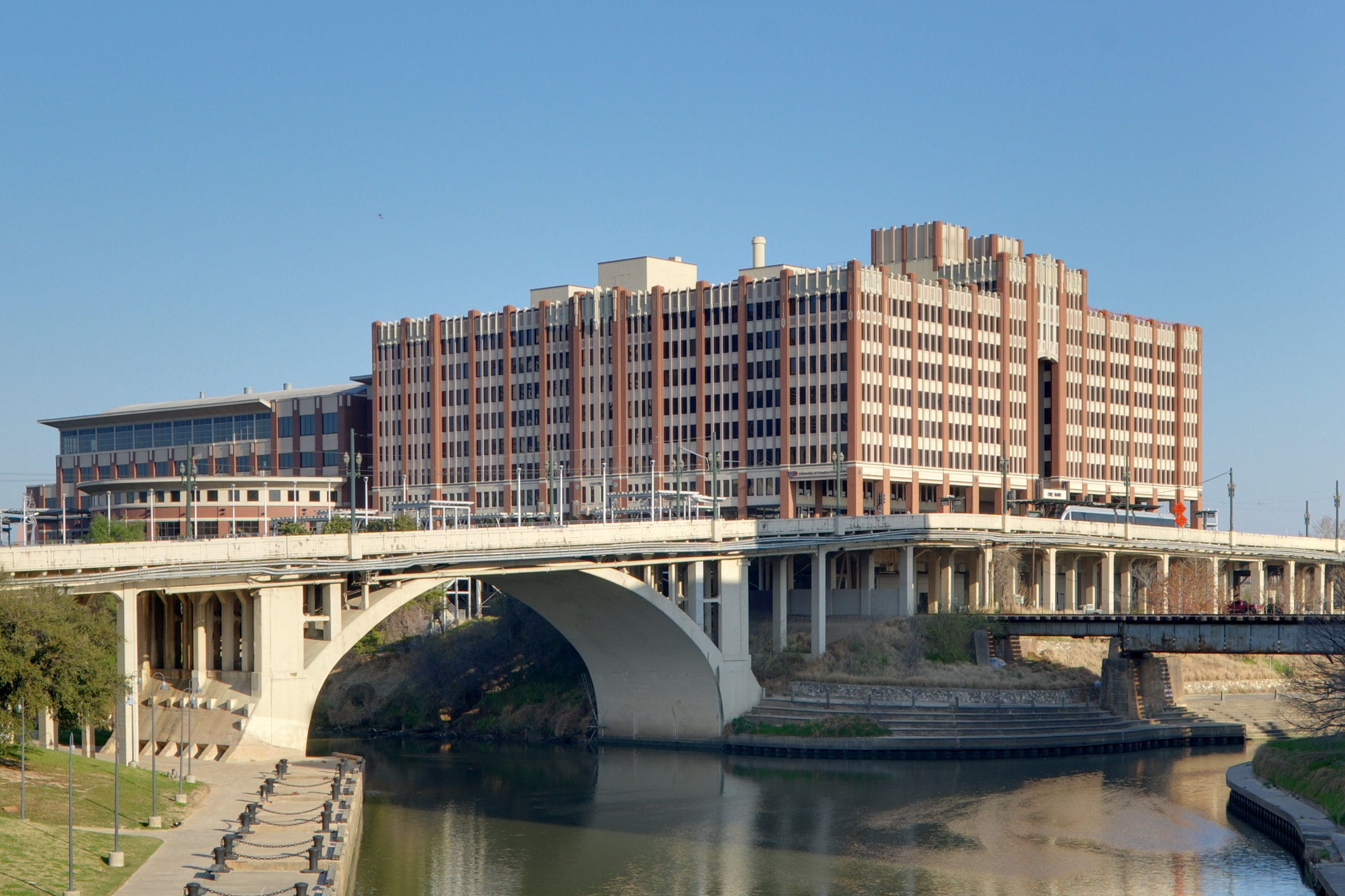
One Main Building (formerly Merchants and Manufacturers Building)

The UHD campus consists of eight buildings at the north end of Downtown Houston and the south end of Northside, next to the crossing of Interstate 10 and Main Street. The university is located near the site where Houston was founded, Allen's Landing. Two of the university's buildings—One Main Building (formerly the Merchants and Manufacturers Building) and the Willow Street Pump Station—are listed in the National Register of Historic Places. UHD also offers classes online at three campuses: UHD-Northwest, Lone Star College Kingwood, and Lone Star College CyFair.

In 2020, UHD opened the College of Sciences and Technology building. The new Wellness & Success Center opened its doors on January 17, 2023.

The university is home to the Harry W. O'Kane Gallery (commonly known as the O'Kane Gallery, which was established in 1970 by gifts from Harry W. O'Kane, Mary W. Bingman, and the Humphreys Foundation. The O'Kane Gallery presents five to six exhibitions that meet the diverse interests of UHD students, faculty, staff, alumni, and campus visitors. Exhibitions in all media provide educational support to various university courses and to nearby schools. The Gallery also functions as a site for university forums, meetings, and receptions. Exhibitions are free and open to the public.

The university once maintained a student dormitory in the former Continental Houston Hotel, located south of the Buffalo Bayou, from 1982 to August 1991; the facility began its use as a hotel in 1961. The students were forced to leave the dormitory the month it closed, and the facility was demolished in 1993. UHD decided to raze the building because the university deemed it more cost effective to do so instead of renovating the facility. The demolition expenses totaled $700,000 while the renovation would have been $8,000,000. Initially the area was to be used for parking cars while a student center was to be later established there.

The UHD campus is served by METRORail's UH–Downtown station on the Red Line.

== Organization and administration ==
=== Governance ===
The University of Houston–Downtown is one of four institutions in the University of Houston System. The institution is separately accredited, offers its own academic programs and confers its own degrees, and has its own administration. The organization and control of the University of Houston–Downtown is vested in the Board of Regents of the University of Houston System. The board has all the rights, powers, and duties that it has with respect to the organization and control of other institutions in the system; however, UHD is maintained as a separate and distinct institution.

=== Administration ===
The president is the chief executive officer of the University of Houston–Downtown, and the position reports to the chancellor of the University of Houston System. The president is appointed by the UHS chancellor and confirmed by the Board of Regents of the University of Houston System. Since March 2021, the president of the university is Loren J. Blanchard. The UHD administration is located on the ninth floor in the One Main Building.

- William I. Dykes (interim), 1974–1975
- J. Don Boney, 1975–1979
- Alexander F. Schilt, 1980–1987
- Manuel T. Pacheco, 1987–1991
- George W. Magner (interim), 1991–1992
- Max Castillo, 1992–2009
- William V. Flores, 2009–2016
- Michael A. Olivas (interim), 2016–2017
- Juan Sánchez Muñoz, 2017–2020
- Antonio D. Tillis (interim), 2020–March 2021
- Loren J. Blanchard, March 2021–present

== Academics ==
Academic rankings

Master's
- Washington Monthly: 92

Regional
- U.S. News & World Report: 62 (tie)

National
- Forbes: 495

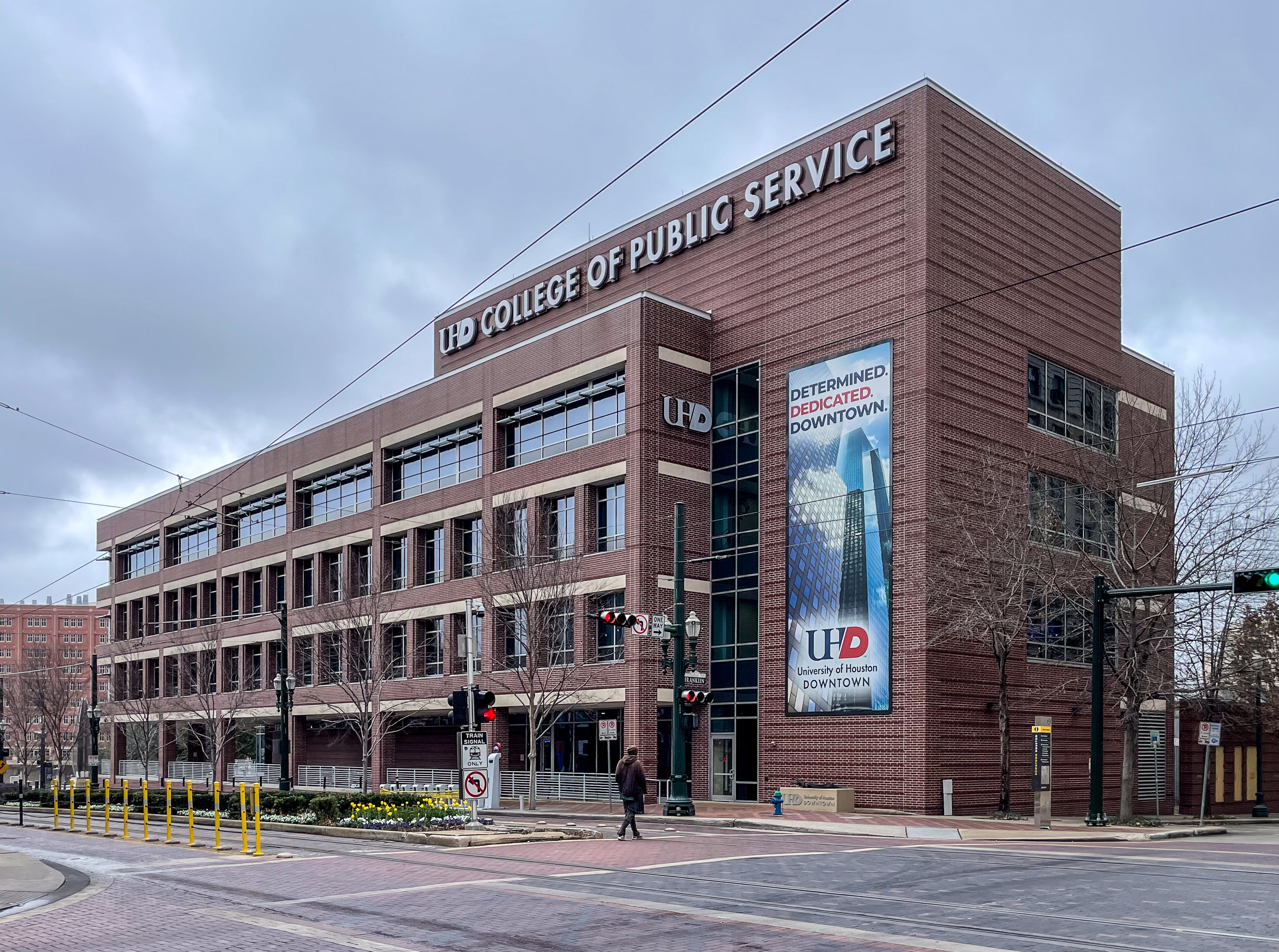
College of Public Service

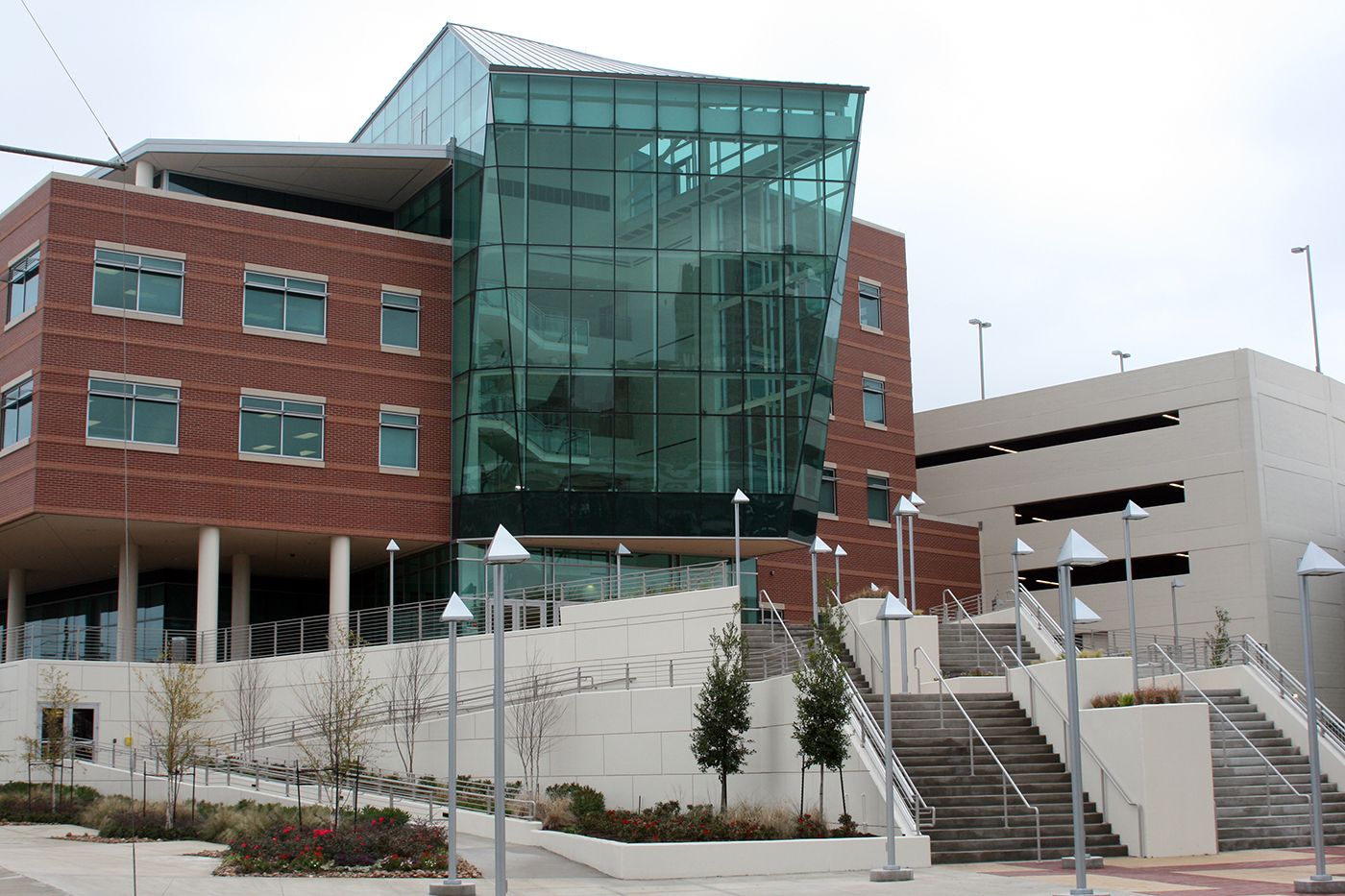
Marilyn Davies College of Business

The University of Houston–Downtown is primarily an undergraduate institution and has four academic colleges:

- Marilyn Davies College of Business
- College of Humanities & Social Sciences
- College of Public Service
- College of Sciences & Technology

=== Admissions ===
The University of Houston–Downtown was the final state university in Texas that had not yet abolished open admissions. The University of Houston System Board of Regents unanimously approved new admissions standards in February 2012, with closed admissions for UHD in the fall of 2013.

== Student life ==
Undergraduate demographics as of Fall 2023
Race and ethnicity	Total
Hispanic	59%
Black	17%
White	11%
Asian	8%
International student	2%
Two or more races	2%
Unknown	1%
Economic diversity
Low-income (Note: The percentage of students who received an income-based federal Pell grant intended for low-income students.)	51%
Affluent (Note: The percentage of students who are a part of the American middle class at the bare minimum.)	49%

Although UHD does not have an intercollegiate varsity athletics program, it does offer its students a number of club sports and intramural sports in addition to numerous fitness programs. UHD's club sports teams are known as the Gators. The UHD mascot is known as Ed-U-Gator.

The university and its community offer additional activities for students such as clubs, organizations, fraternities, and sororities. Their student newspaper is The Dateline.

== Notable alumni ==
- Ghulam Bombaywala, restaurateur
- Daniel Comeaux, Chief of the Dallas Police Department
- Juan Díaz, professional boxer and former Lightweight World Champion
- Mario Gallegos Jr., member of the Texas Senate
- Ed Gonzalez, Harris County Sheriff
- Ananth Prabhu Gurpur, cyberlaw expert, Professor in Computer Engineering at the Sahyadri College of Engineering and Management, author
- Diana López, taekwondo practitioner (2008 Olympic bronze medalist)
- Charles McClelland, former Chief of the Houston Police Department (2010–2016)
- Phil Montgomery, member of the Wisconsin State Assembly
- Troy Nehls, Congressman from Texas.
- Devon Still, professional football player, founder of the Still Strong Foundation
- Lorenzo Thomas, poet and former faculty member
