= The Washington Campus Board of Directors =

The Washington Campus Board of Directors is the governing body of The Washington Campus.

== Current board members ==
=== Leadership ===
- Chairman, Dr. Ash Soni, Executive Associate Dean for Academic Programs, Kelley School of Business Indiana University
- Vice Chairman, The Honorable Bruce Mehlman, Esq., Founding Partner, Mehlman Castagnetti Rosen & Thomas

=== Consortium Board Members ===
- Dr. Bradley Alge, Associate PRofessor of MAnagement, Krannert School of Management Purdue University
- Dr. Shawn L. Berman, Associate Dean, The Anderson School of Management, The University of New Mexico
- Professor Norman D. Bishara, Esq. Associate Dean for Undergraduate & Early Career Programs, Ross School of Business, The University of Michigan
- Dr. S. Selcuk Erenguc, Senior Associate Dean, Warrington College of Business, University of Florida
- Dr. Barron H. Harvey, Dean of School of Business, Howard University
- Ms. Gail Justino-Miller, Associate Dean of Graduate Business Programs, D'Amore-McKim School of Business Northeastern University
- Dr. Gerald D. Keim, Professor of Management and EMBA Faculty Director, W.P.Carey School of Business, Arizona State University
- Dr. J.B. Kurish, Senior Associate Dean for Executive Education, Goizueta Business School, Emory University
- Dr. Diana R. Lawson, Dean, Seidman College of Business, Grand Valley State University
- Dr. Arvind Mahajan, Associate Dean for Graduate Programs, Mays Business School at Texas A&M University
- Dr. Shashi Matta, Director of Full Time MBA and Working Professionals, Max M. Fisher College of Business, Ohio State University
- Dr. David Vogel, Soloman P. Lee Chair in Business Ethics Haas School of Business at University of California, Berkeley
- Dr. Timothy Werner, Associate Professor, Department of Business, Government & Society, McCombs School of Business, University of Texas at Austin
- Dr. Duane Windsor, Lynette S. Autrey Professor of Management, Jones Graduate School of Business, Rice University

=== At-Large Board Members ===
- Ms. Maya MacGuineas, President, Committee for a Responsible Federal Budget
- Roger B. Porter, IBM Professor of Business and Government, Harvard Kennedy School, Harvard University
- Dr. Michael D. Lord, President and CEO, The Washington Campus

=== Honorary Board Members ===
- David R. Gergen, Director, Center for Public Leadership, Harvard Kennedy School, Harvard University

=== In Memoriam ===
- The Honorable L. William Seidman, Founder, The Washington Campus
