= Business Student Council =

Texas A&M business student government

- Founded: November 18, 1968; 58 years ago
- Founded at: Texas A&M University
- Type: Student council
- Legal status: Active
- Publication: The Edge (defunct)
- Website: www.maysbsc.com

Business Student Council (BSC) is the student government for Mays Business School at Texas A&M University. They are best known for hosting the largest student-run business career fair in the United States. They provide various events and services for the school, including Mays merchandise sales, the semiannual Maysfest festival, the Aggie Ring Scholarship, and the Career Closet.

The council is a consistent donor to Mays Business School. Two of the most notable donations include those that helped establish the Jerry and Kay Cox Graduate Business Center in 2003 and the Wayne Roberts ’85 Building in 2023.

== History ==
Business Student Council was established on November 18, 1968, to function as an umbrella organization between the students and the faculty at Mays Business School. In 1979, the president and advisor of BSC met with then-dean Dr. William Muse to discuss establishing a career fair for the school. The following year, in April 1980, BSC hosted the business school's first Career Fair. The fair was held on one day in the Rudder Exhibit Hall (now Rudder Tower), surrounded by a week of activities that included seminars, receptions, and banquets.

Due to the success of the first fair, the following year's career fair was expanded over two days. In a 1986 interview, then-advisor Lynn Zimmerman stated that, "we had 27 companies at that first fair. In 1981, we had 32 companies. For 1986, we have 75 commitments and we're not through yet." By the late 1990s, the Career Fair had grown to be the largest student-run career fair in the nation. In the most recent career fair in 2026, over 200 companies attended the fair. Other student-run fairs have since surpassed it in size, but it remains the largest student-run business career fair.

In 1983, the Academic and Agency Building was rededicated as the John R. Blocker Building. At the time, it was one of the largest buildings on campus, and Mays Business School was moved into the space. Council executives were invited to the dedication ceremony, and BSC was given an office in room 101.

BSC began publication of The Edge in 1986, a newsletter intended to keep Texas A&M's business students up-to-date on events at Mays. It was first named The Business, then The Business Edge, before finally the name was shortened to The Edge. The newsletter was published regularly until 2009, when a lack of interest (and increasing expense) resulted in the publication's end.

In 1998, BSC made two large financial gifts to Mays Business School. The first established a Business Student Council Leadership Endowed Scholarship to “support business students who are active leaders in a business student organization.” The second donation was used to support the expansion of the Wehner Building, including a new office for the council. Housed in room 151, the room was named the Business Student Council Leadership Room.

In 2003, BSC made an additional financial gift to build the Jerry and Kay Cox Graduate Business Center, a further expansion of the Wehner Building. BSC was the only student organization to make a donation, with other donors including Accenture, Ford Motor Company, Frost Bank, and Verizon.

The same year the Cox Center opened, the council began hosting Maysfest, a day-long festival hosted for students outside of the Wehner Building. Free food, merchandise, and activities are typically offered. The festival hosts a rotation of various companies, charities, student businesses, games, and other student organizations. The festival is often sponsored by local Bryan-College Station companies.

During the COVID-19 pandemic, BSC moved events and operations, including the career fair, online. In an interview with The Battalion, then-president Anna Krum stated that, “My goal is to have [Business Student Council] continue to the fullest extent possible with respect to the university guidelines. This may look like hosting a lot of our events virtually that we normally hosted in person, whether that’s our meetings or different professional development events.”

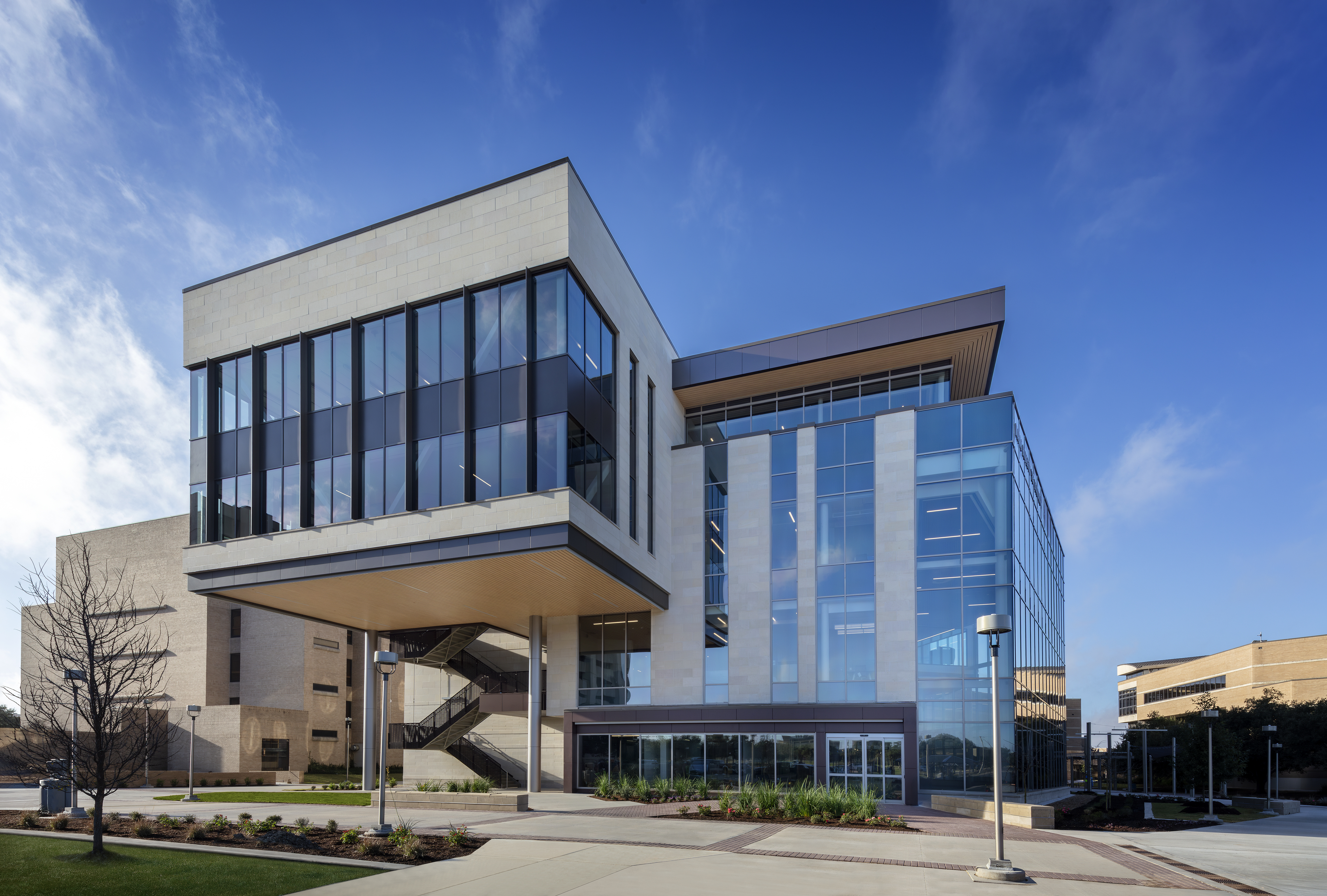
Wayne Roberts ’85 Building at Mays Business School

In 2023, BSC pledged a donation to the building of the Wayne Roberts ’85 Building. The donation paid for a room named after longtime advisor and accounting professor Natalie Allen. The BSC executive team was invited to the groundbreaking ceremony for the Wayne Roberts Building.

== Organizational structure ==
The council is currently made up of seven different committees: Events, Finance, Mays Exchange, Marketing, Career Fair, Project Mays, and Internal Affairs. Each committee is led by a vice president; the seven vice presidents are in turn led by the president.

The council's structure has changed repeatedly since its establishment. Several past committees are now defunct, including the Technology committee, the Public Relations committee, the External Affairs committee, and The Edge committee (ended after the newsletter was removed from circulation in 2009). Before the committees, the council was composed of elected representatives from other Mays student organizations. As stated in a 1987 article of The Edge, "each business organization school students elects representatives from each class to serve on the Council. The presidents and vice-presidents or their liasons are also members. The council members then elect their own officers." While prospective members today now apply directly to the council, the participation and input of other Mays organizations is encouraged through BSC-hosted roundtable discussions.

In an interview with the Texas A&M Foundation, former council president and filmmaker Greg Kwedar praised the impact the council had on his development. “I started as a member and then planned the professional trip that we took to Seattle before becoming president my senior year,” he stated. “It was such a game-changing education for me to be responsible for an organization with a significant budget and so many objectives focused on benefiting business students.”

== Notable alumni ==
- Greg Kwedar (2007) - Academy Award-nominated film director and screenwriter
