= Mays Business School =

Business school at Texas A&M University

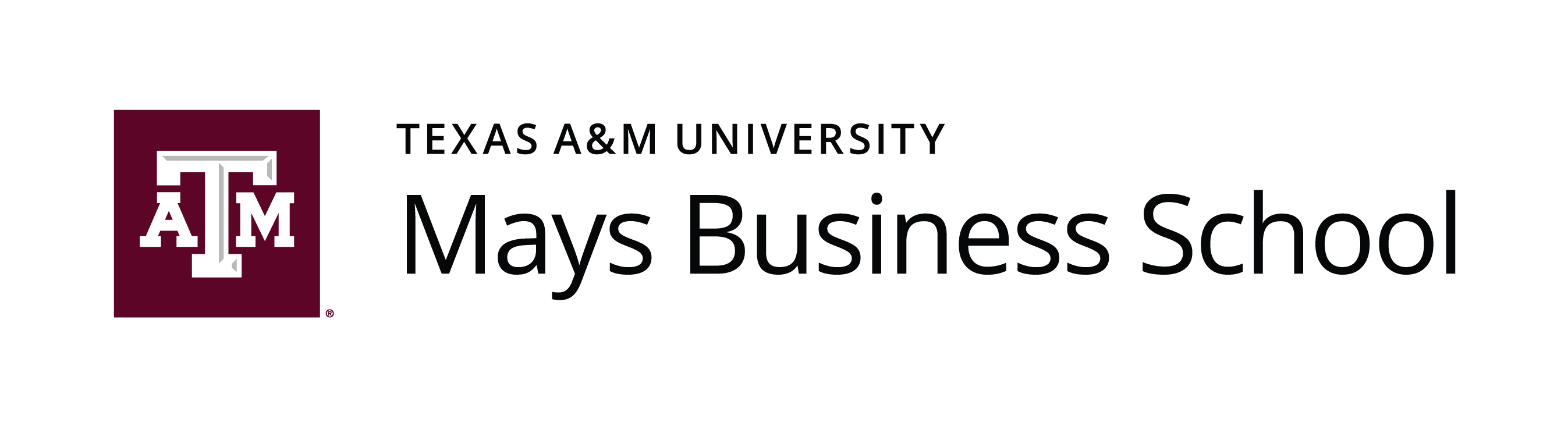
- Motto: Where Business Meets Leadership
- Type: Public
- Established: 1968; 58 years ago
- Parent institution: Texas A&M University
- Affiliations: AACSB; The Washington Campus
- Dean: Nate Sharp
- Students: 8,181 (Fall 2025)
- Undergraduates: 5,922 (Fall 2025)
- Postgraduates: 2,259 (Fall 2025)
- Location: 210 Olsen Blvd College Station, Texas 77843-4113, College Station, Texas, United States; 30.610637°N 96.350886°W
- Colors: Maroon & White
- Website: mays.tamu.edu

Mays Business School is the business school at Texas A&M University. The school educates more than 8,100 undergraduate, master’s, and doctoral students in accounting, finance, management, management information systems, marketing, and supply chain management.

Mays Business School was one of the first five schools in the United States to offer a trading center, originally known as the Securities & Commodities Trading Center. Today, the Phillips 66 Trading Room provides students with hands-on training using the same tools and technologies employed by commodities, energy and currency traders. Students also use the center to manage the Reveille Fund, a $3 million portfolio created using donated funds. Additionally, the Mays houses the Center for Retailing Innovation, which was the first retailing center partnered with a business school.

== History ==
Upon the establishment of Texas A&M University in 1876, business classes were offered in conjunction with mechanical and agricultural classes. The university offered coursework in double-entry bookkeeping and creamery management. In 1920, the Department of Economics and the Agricultural Administration began offering additional business courses; by the end of the decade, the college had established new departments for accounting and statistics, farm and ranch management, marketing, and finance.

Shortly after World War II, Thomas W. Leland became the first department head of the newly created Department of Business and Accounting inside the School of Arts and Sciences. After Leland's retirement in 1961, the School of Business Administration was formed. The new head of the department, John Pearson, spearheaded the formation of the accounting, business analysis and research, finance, marketing, and management departments. The Master of Business Administration (MBA) program debuted in 1966, and two years later, in 1968, the college was officially established when Texas A&M received University status, and the School of Business became the College of Business Administration. The college was accredited by the American Assembly of Collegiate Schools of Business (AACSB) in 1972, and began awarding doctorate degrees the same year.

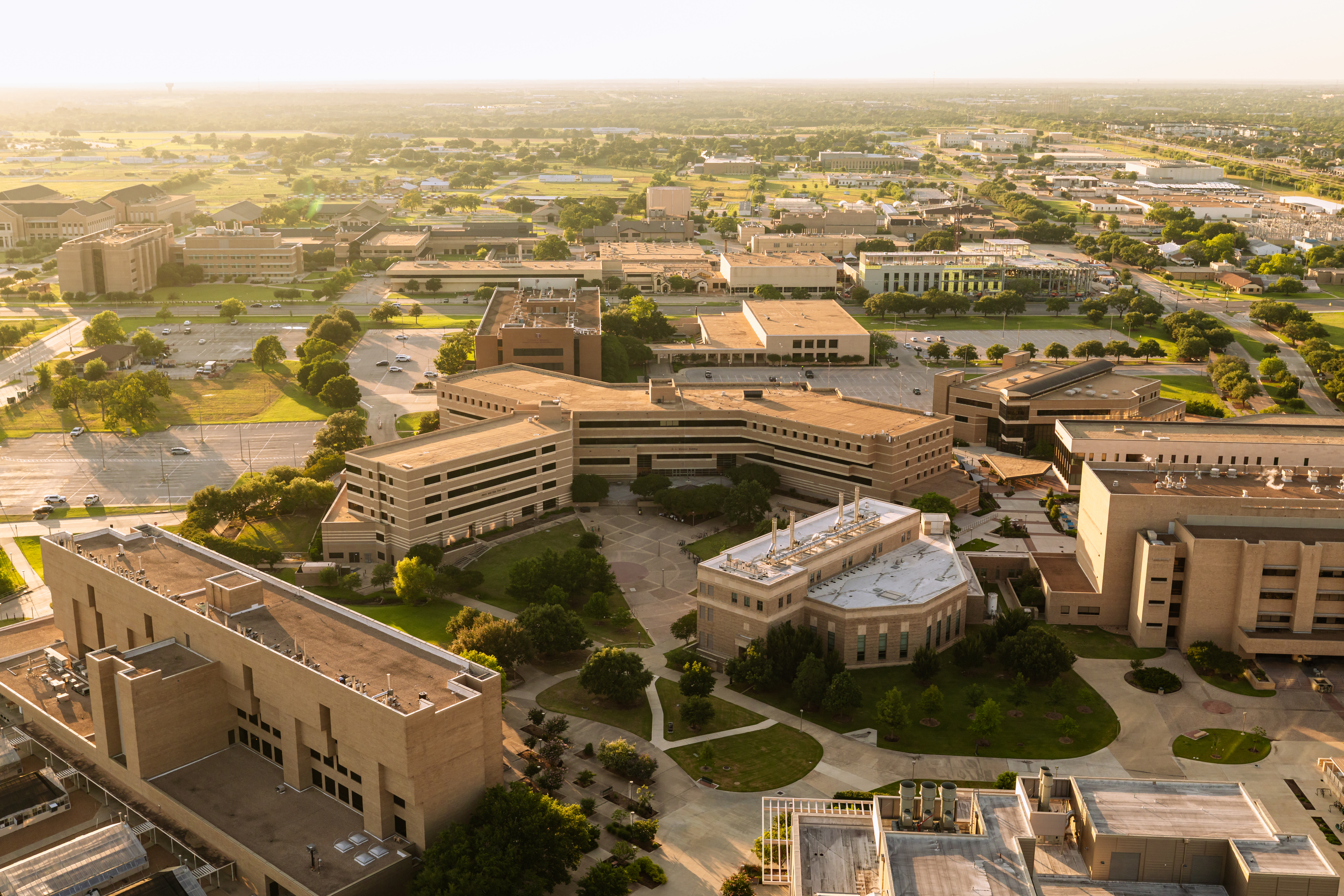
Aerial view of Mays Business School

In 1979, Business Student Council, the student government for the business school, met with then-dean Dr. William Muse to discuss establishing a career fair for the school. The following year, in April 1980, the council hosted the business school's first Career Fair. After the immense success of the first fair, the following year's career fair was expanded over two days. In a 1986 interview, professor and then-advisor of the council Lynn Zimmerman stated that, "we had 27 companies at that first fair. In 1981, we had 32 companies. For 1986, we have 75 commitments and we're not through yet."

Over the next several decades, the college continued to grow. In 1981, the College of Business Administration was moved into the John R. Blocker Building, at the time one of the largest buildings on campus. Various centers were established, including the Center for International Business Studies, the Center for Retailing Studies, and the Center for Human Resources Management. In 1994, the West Campus Library (later renamed the Business Library & Collaboration Commons) was built. By the late 1990s, the Career Fair had grown to be the largest student-run career fair in the nation.

In 1995, the College of Business Administration moved into the newly built Wehner Building on the western edge of Texas A&M's campus. The following year, the College was endowed by Lowry Mays, founder of Clear Channel Communications, and the school was renamed Lowry Mays College & Graduate School of Business. Six years later, the name was simplified to Mays Business School. By 2003, an additional wing had been added to the Wehner Building, housing the 66,000-square-foot (6,100 m^{2}) Jerry and Kay Cox Graduate Business Center. Donations for the expansion were led by a $1.5 million donation from Jerry and Kay Cox, as well as additional donations from Accenture, Ford Motor Company, Frost Bank, Verizon, Business Student Council, and private donors.

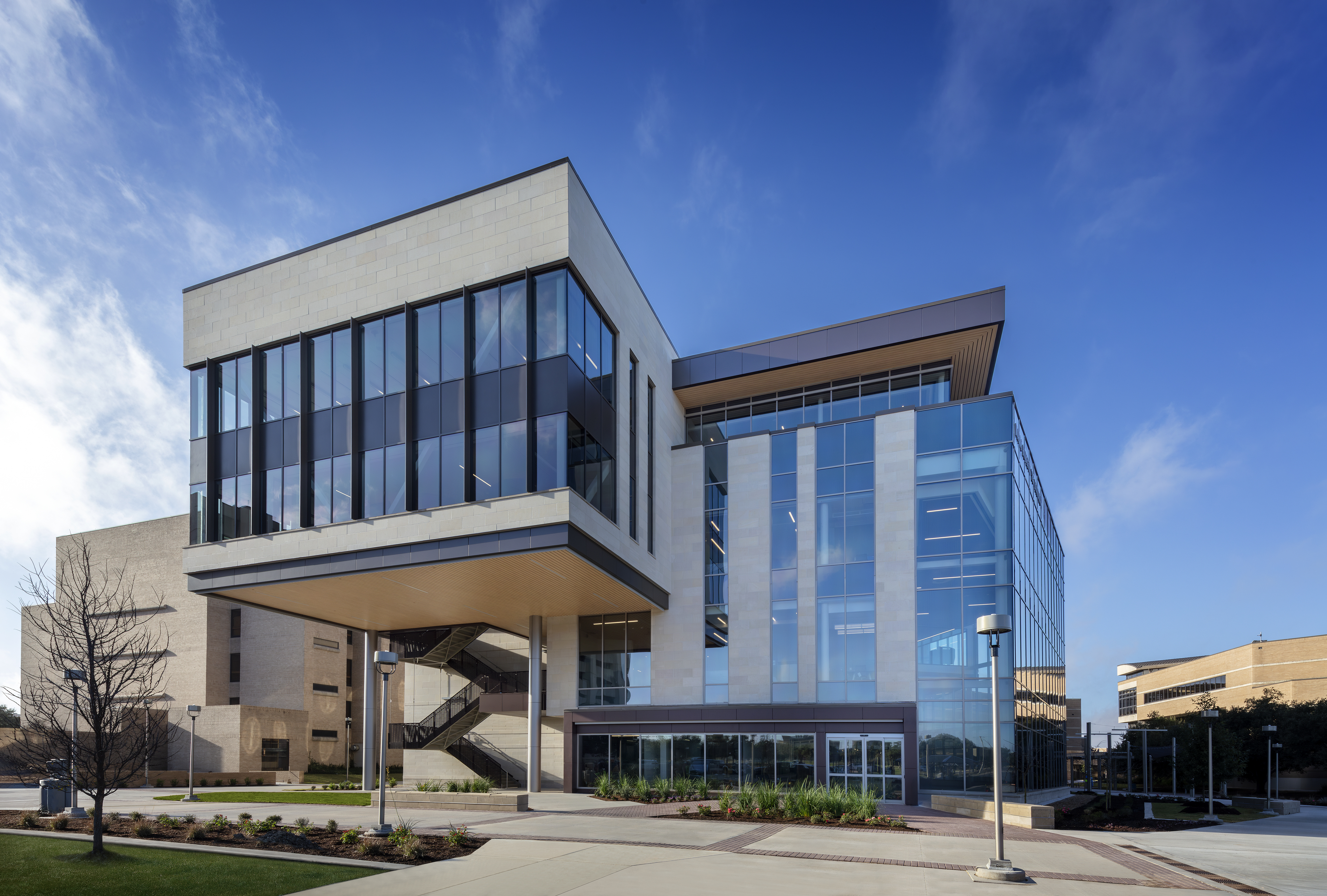
Exterior view of the Wayne Roberts ’85 Building at Mays Business School

In 2017, the Mays Family Foundation made a $25 million commitment to Mays Business School, the largest commitment in the history of the school. The donation was made in April 2024, bringing the Mays Family Foundation's lifetime giving to $72 million. The $25 million will serve as a lead donation to the Lowry Mays Class of '57 Building and establish additional graduate-level education. The building is slated to open in 2028.

In January 2025, the Wayne Roberts '85 Building was opened, an 82,500-square-foot building included an atrium, cafe, classrooms, and study areas. Simultaneously, the ConocoPhillips Collaboration Plaza was built outside, connecting the Wehner and Roberts buildings.

== Rankings ==
The school's graduate and undergraduate programs have been recognized in national and international rankings.

=== Graduate program rankings ===
Program	Ranking	Scope	Publisher	Year
Full-Time MBA in Texas	#1		Bloomberg Businessweek	2026-27
Executive MBA in Texas	#1		Financial Times	2026
Online Master's in Business	#1	Public	U.S. News & World Report	2026
Online Master's in Business Programs for Veterans	#1		U.S. News & World Report	2026
Online Master's in Business Offering Leadership	#1		U.S. News & World Report	2025
Master's in Finance	#2	U.S., Public	Financial Times	2026
Executive MBA	#3	U.S., Public	Financial Times	2026
Executive MBA	#7	Public	U.S. News & World Report	2026
Full-Time MBA	#7	Public	Bloomberg Businessweek	2026–27
Online Master's in Business Analytics	#9	Public	U.S. News & World Report	2026
Graduate Analytics Program	#9	Public	U.S. News & World Report	2026
Graduate Accounting Program	#12	Public	U.S. News & World Report	2026
Full-Time MBA	#13	Public	Fortune	2026
Graduate Production/Operations Management Program	#14	Public	U.S. News & World Report	2026
Full-Time MBA	#15	Public	U.S. News & World Report	2026
Full-Time MBA	#15	Public	Poets & Quants	2025

=== Undergraduate program rankings ===
Program	Ranking	Scope	Publisher	Year
Undergraduate Accounting Program	#6	Public	U.S. News & World Report	2027
Undergraduate Management Program	#7	Public	U.S. News & World Report	2027
Undergraduate Finance Program	#9	Public	U.S. News & World Report	2027
Undergraduate Marketing Program	#9	Public	U.S. News & World Report	2027
Undergraduate Production/Operations Management Program	#13	Public	U.S. News & World Report	2027
Undergraduate Business Program	#13	Public	U.S. News & World Report	2027
Undergraduate Business School	#15	Public	Poets & Quants	2025

== Academics ==
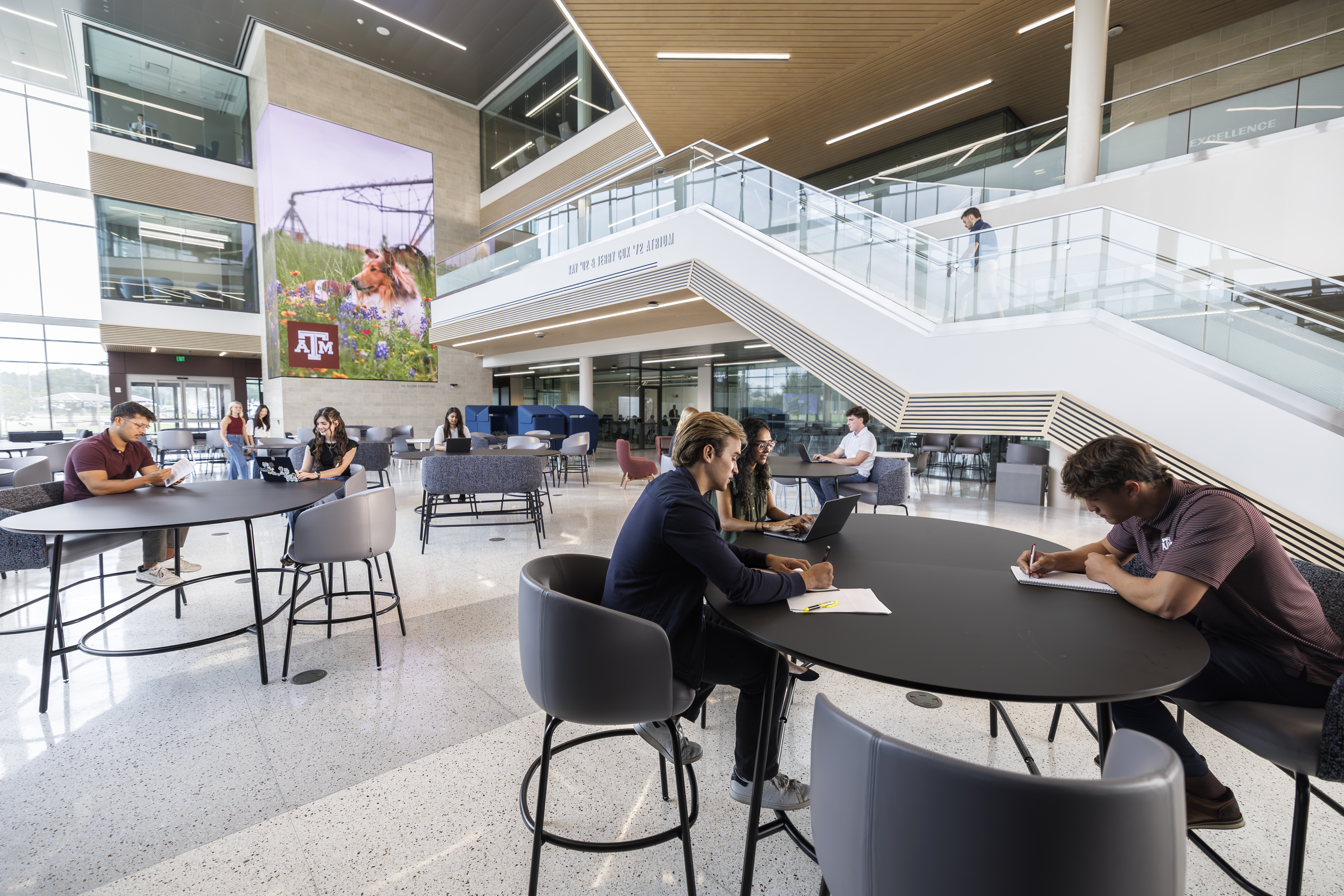
Students in the atrium of the Wayne Roberts ’85 Building.

The business school is subdivided into five academic departments: accounting, finance, information & operations management, management, and marketing.

In 2017, the accounting department was renamed to the James Benjamin Department of Accounting in recognition of Benjamin's $4 million gift. In 2022, the finance department was renamed the Adam C. Sinn '00 Department of Finance in recognition of a $20 million gift to support Mays finance students.

In addition to traditional graduation routes, Mays offers five-year programs. In the Professional Program in Accounting, students earn their BBA in accounting and a Master of Science in various disciplines concurrently.

=== Research centers ===
- Adam C. Sinn Center for Investment Management
- Phillips 66 Trading Room
- Center for Applied Entrepreneurship and Innovation
- Reynolds & Reynolds Sales Leadership Institute
- Reliant Student Experience Office
- Center for Retailing Innovation
- Center for International Business Studies
- Center for Executive Development
- Center for Human Resource Management
- Flippen Leadership Institute
- Patent and Trademark Center

== Student life ==
=== Undergraduate programs ===
- Aggies on Wall Street is an undergraduate finance program focused on investment banking and capital markets.
- Trading, Risk, and Investments Program (TRIP) is an undergraduate certificate program and graduate pathway focused on energy trading, investments, and risk management.
- Professional Program of Accounting (PPA) is a five-year integrated bachelor's and master's degree program in accounting and related business disciplines.
- The Reveille Fund is a student-managed investment fund through which students manage a portion of the investment portfolio of the University of Texas/Texas A&M Investment Management Company (UTIMCO).
- The Tanner Fund is a student-managed investment fund through which students manage an equity investment portfolio.
- Titans of Investing is a collegiate program centered on investing, financial markets, and related economic issues.

=== Notable student organizations ===
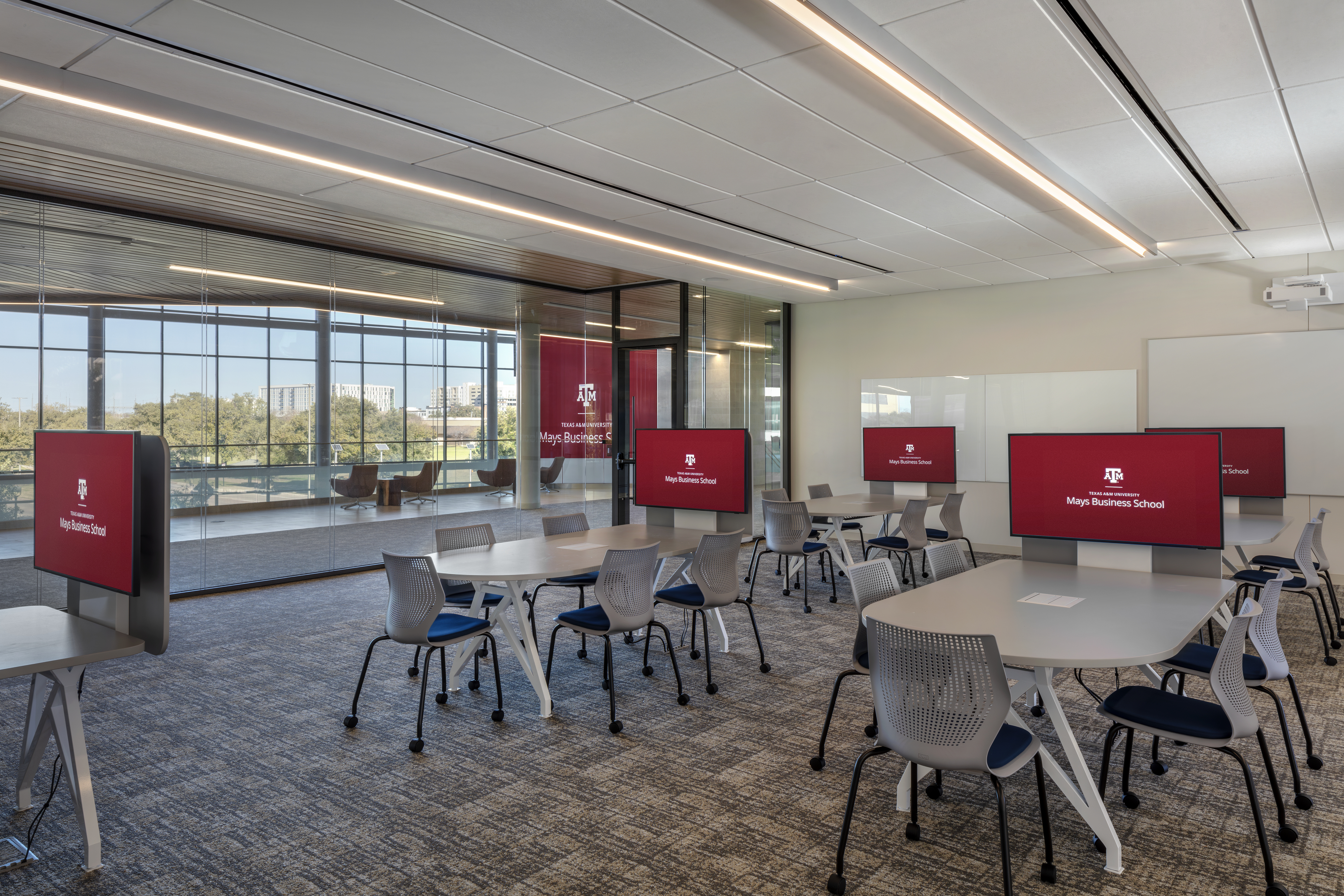
A collaborative classroom in the Wayne Roberts ’85 Building.

There are 32 officially recognized student organizations at Mays. Several of the most notable organizations are noted below.

- Business Student Council (BSC)
  - Founded in 1968, BSC is responsible for some of the largest events and projects at Texas A&M, including the Business Career Fair, Maysfest, and Mays apparel sales.
  - Functions as an liaison between students and faculty at Mays Business School; umbrella organization between the Dean's office and student organizations.
- Aggie Investment Club (AIC)
  - Founded in 2000, AIC's functions include speaker series, Security Analysis Workshops (SAW), and travel series which has included meetings with Warren Buffett, George Mitchell, Sam Zell, and Lee Bass; among others.
  - Run a student-managed $60,000 pod-based equity fund.
- Future Business Leaders of America (FBLA)
  - Founded in 1958, chapter of national career and technical student organization.
- Financial Management Association (FMA)
  - Founded in 1970, offers introductory career advice for business majors at Texas A&M.

== People ==
=== Notable alumni ===
- Cigna COO and President David Cordani '88
- Humana CEO and President Bruce Broussard '84
- Halliburton CEO, President, and Chairman of the Board Jeff Miller (American businessman) '88
- Chicago Bears Defensive Coordinator Dennis Allen (American football)
- Permanent University Fund (UTIMCO) Chief Investment Officer, Teacher Retirement System of Texas Chief Investment Officer, Bridgewater Associates former CEO Thomas Britton Harris IV '80
- Koch Industries Co-Owner, CEO, and Chairman Chase Koch
- Kinder Morgan CEO Kimberly Dang '92
- Southwest Airlines CCO Ryan Green '99
- Academy Award-nominated filmmaker Greg Kwedar '08

=== Notable faculty ===
- Leonard Berry, distinguished professor of marketing
- R. Duane Ireland, distinguished professor of management and former interim dean
- Eli Jones, professor of marketing and former dean
- Venkatesh Shankar, professor of marketing
- Murray Barrick, distinguished professor of management
- Shrihari Sridhar, senior associate dean
- Lorraine Eden, professor emerita of management

=== List of Deans ===
- John Pearson (1968–1978)
- William Muse (1978–1982)
- William Mobley (1983–1986)
- A. Benton Cocanougher (1987–2001)
- Jerry Strawser (2001-2015)
- Eli Jones (2015–2021)
- Nate Sharp (2023–Present)

== See also ==
- List of United States business school rankings
- List of business schools in the United States
