= Nate Sharp =

American university administrator

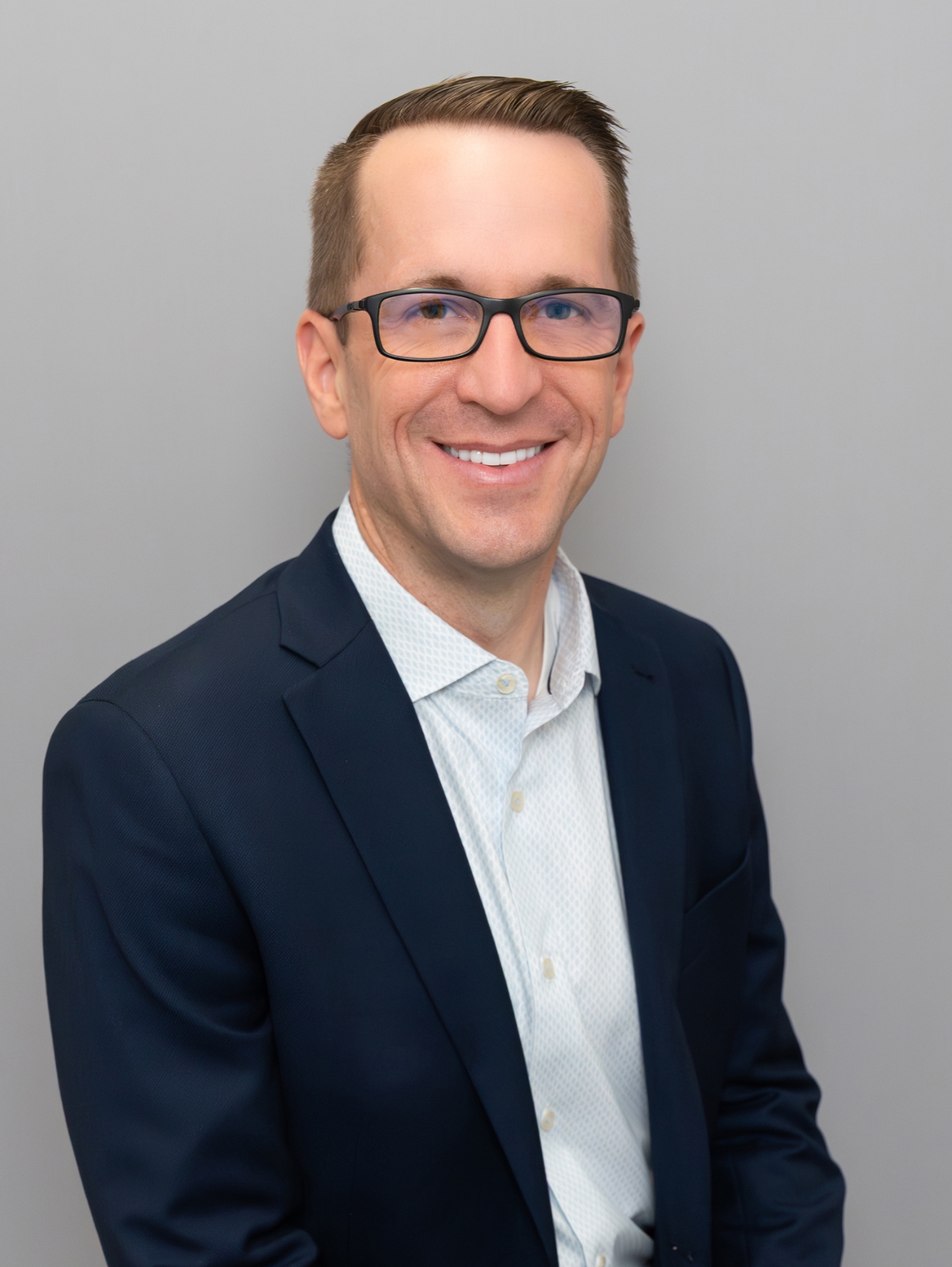

Dean of Mays Business School

Personal details
- Born: March 14, 1977 (age 49) Salt Lake City, Utah, U.S.
- Education: Brigham Young University (BS and MAcc) University of Texas at Austin (PhD)

Nate Sharp is an American scholar and academic leader who serves as the seventh dean of Mays Business School at Texas A&M University. He holds the Adam C. Sinn '00 Dean's Leadership Chair.

== Early life and education ==
Sharp was born in Salt Lake City and grew up in Holladay, Utah. He graduated from Olympus High School in 1995 and attended Brigham Young University (BYU) in Provo, Utah. Following a two-year volunteer mission for The Church of Jesus Christ of Latter-day Saints in South Korea, Sharp graduated from BYU's Marriott School of Business in 2002 with a bachelor's degree cum laude and a master's degree, both in accounting. He later received a doctorate in accounting from the University of Texas at Austin's McCombs School of Business in 2007.

== Career ==
Sharp became an assistant professor of accounting at Texas A&M University's Mays Business School in 2007. During his time at Texas A&M, Sharp has served in multiple leadership positions. After his promotion to associate professor with tenure, he served as the PhD Program Coordinator in the James Benjamin Department of Accounting at Mays Business School. Later, following the retirement of long-time department head Dr. James Benjamin, Sharp was appointed to succeed Benjamin as head of the James Benjamin Department of Accounting in 2020. At the conclusion of a national search for the new dean of Mays Business School in 2022, Sharp was announced as the new dean on December 13, 2022, and began serving as dean on February 1, 2023.

Sharp's scholarly research encompasses corporate financial reporting, sell-side and buy-side financial analysts, investor relations, financial journalism, and financial misconduct. His research is published in numerous leading scholarly journals and has received multiple best-paper awards, including the 2018 Best Paper Award from the American Accounting Association's Financial Accounting and Reporting Section and the 2021 Distinguished Contributions to the Accounting Literature Award from the American Accounting Association. The influence of his research extends beyond academia, including discussions in The Wall Street Journal, Financial Times, CNBC, Forbes, CFO.com, and the Harvard Law School Forum on Corporate Governance and Financial Regulation.

Within the academic community at Texas A&M University, Dr. Sharp has educated both undergraduate and graduate students. His dedication to teaching excellence has garnered multiple teaching awards, including a 2010 Texas A&M University System Teaching Excellence Award, the 2012-13 Texas A&M University Center for Teaching Excellence Montague Scholar Award, the 2012 Ernst & Young Teaching Excellence Award, the 2015 Texas A&M University Association of Former Students Distinguished Teaching Award, and the 2018 David and Denise Baggett Teaching Award.

In recognition of his impact on his field and on the university community, Sharp was named a Texas A&M University Presidential Impact Fellow in 2018.

== Personal life ==
Sharp married Holly Carroll in 2003 and they are the parents of five children. Sharp and his family are active members of The Church of Jesus Christ of Latter-day Saints, and Sharp has served as a bishop, stake president, and area seventy in the church.
