= Breeja Larson =

American swimmer (born 1992)

Personal information
- National team: United States
- Born: April 16, 1992 (age 34) Mesa, Arizona, U.S.
- Height: 6 ft 0 in (1.83 m)
- Weight: 161 lb (73 kg)

Sport
- Sport: Swimming
- Strokes: Breaststroke
- College team: Texas A&M University
- Coach: Steve Bultman; Texas A&M University
Medal record
Women's swimming
Representing United States
Olympic Games
Gold medal – first place	2012 London	4x100 m medley
World Championships (LC)
Gold medal – first place	2013 Barcelona	4×100 m medley
Pan Pacific Championships
Bronze medal – third place	2014 Gold Coast	100 m breaststroke

Breeja Larson (born April 16, 1992) is an American retired swimmer who specialized in breaststroke. She competed in college for Texas A&M University. Larson won a gold medal in the 4×100-meter medley relay at the 2012 Summer Olympics.

== Early life ==
Larson was born in Mesa, Arizona, one of seven sisters. She later moved to Boise, Idaho, where she attended Boise's Centennial High School for three years and graduated from Mountain View High School in Mesa, Arizona, in 2010. She swam for the Centennial Patriot and Mountain View Toros high school swim teams. As a senior, she was the state runner-up in the 100-yard breaststroke. She also lettered in softball and track and field.

== College career ==
She attended Texas A&M University, where she swam for the Texas A&M Aggies swimming and diving team in National Collegiate Athletic Association (NCAA) competition from 2011 to 2014 under Hall of Fame Coach Steve Bultman. As a freshman, she finished second in both the 100-yard and 200-yard breaststroke at the 2011 NCAA Women's Swimming and Diving Championships; as a sophomore in 2012, she was the NCAA national champion in the 100-yard breaststroke, and finished third in the 200-yard event.

Larson graduated from the Titans of Investing program while at Texas A&M.

== 2012 Olympics ==
At the 2012 United States Olympic Trials in Omaha, Nebraska, Larson made the U.S. Olympic team for the first time by winning the 100-meter breaststroke in a time of 1:05.92, ahead of favorite Rebecca Soni. At the Olympics in London, she earned a gold medal by swimming for the winning U.S. team in the preliminaries of the 4×100-meter medley relay. In the final of the 100-meter breaststroke, Larson false started. However, it was determined there was a technical issue and she was allowed to compete. She finished in sixth place.

== See also ==
- List of Olympic medalists in swimming (women)
- List of Texas A&M University people
- List of United States records in swimming
