= William F. Walker =

American academic administrator (1937–2007)

William F. Walker (December 1, 1937 – August 7, 2007) was an American academic administrator who served as the President of Auburn University from 2001 to 2004.

== Biography ==
William F. Walker was born on December 1, 1937, in Sherman, Texas. He graduated with a B.A. and an M.A. in aerospace engineering from the University of Texas at Austin. He later got his Ph.D. in mechanical engineering from Oklahoma State University. From 1965 to 1988, he taught at Rice University. He then became Dean of the College of Engineering at Auburn University.

He endorsed Governor Bob Riley.

He died of cancer in 2007.

== William F. Walker Teaching Awards ==
The Fred and Mary Lou Birdsong Teaching Awards were renamed as the William F. Walker Teaching Awards in 2001. The award is presented annually to an outstanding member of the Engineering faculty at Auburn.

Academic offices
Preceded by William Muse	President of Auburn University; 2001–2004	Succeeded by Jay Gogue
