= Titans of Investing =

American professional fraternity and course

- Founded: 2006; 20 years ago
- Founded at: Texas A&M University
- Type: Course, professional fraternity, and think tank
- Legal status: Active
- Members: 1000
- Publication: Titan Brief
- Website: http://titansofinvesting.org

Titans of Investing, commonly referred to as Titans, is a collegiate program founded and led by investor Britt Harris. The program consists of a semester course, a professional fraternity, and a think tank. It is modeled on Benjamin Franklin's Junto and emphasizes "wisdom, personal understanding, and growth" through "collaboration, civil discourse, and a sincere search for truth".

Titans is funded by over 80 individual and corporate sponsors. Graduates are referred to as "Titans", nationally recognized for "excellence, intellect, and integrity", and highly recruited by employers. As of Fall 2026, the alumni network consists of more than 1000 Titans.

== History ==
=== Establishment ===
In the spring of 2005, Britt Harris was the chief executive officer of Bridgewater Associates; the largest hedge fund in the world at that time. After having worked for nearly two decades in wealth management, Harris decided to create the "Titan Series", a course that explored meaning of life, common good, and the greatest literary works. The initial concept was to study his "top 10 books" and his "top 10 practitioners" in each key business field (i.e., management, investing, accounting, economics, et cetera). Harris asked 70 peers throughout business, academia, and politics for the most influential books on their careers. With a list of over 200 books, Harris returned to his alma mater at Texas A&M University in the fall of 2005.

=== Development ===
Throughout the fall of 2005 and spring of 2006, Britt Harris recruited a select group of students from Texas A&M University to help organize, examine, and distill over 200 literary works and develop the course curriculum. Influenced by his mentor Bob Buford, Harris designed the course with the philosophy of living a life of "success to significance" rather than pursuing "success after success". Harris modeled the course structure on Benjamin Franklin's Junto to emphasize "wisdom, personal understanding, and growth" through "collaboration, civil discourse, and a sincere search for truth".

The curriculum was finished and adopted by Mays Business School as Titans Course in the summer of 2006. The first class, "Titans 1", launched in the 2006 fall semester and graduated the first 15 Titans.

=== Growth ===
In September 2016, a chapter was established at the Hankamer School of Business of Baylor University. In January 2018, a chapter was established at the McCombs Business School of University of Texas at Austin.

Book summaries produced by the Titans Course developed into an think tank called "Titans Briefs". Titans Briefs are freely released into the public domain, but do require a login to access. As of May 2019, the digital archive features 415 briefs.

The Titans alumni network now spans 23 states and 11 countries. As of May 2019, the alumni network consists of 542 Titans from 34 classes.

== Administration ==
The Titans of Investing program is led by Britt Harris, who also serves as professor of the Titans Course, and operated by its students. Student administration positions include Network Program Manager, Wisdom Program Manager, Reach Program Manager, and Finance Program Manager.

At a higher level, the program is overseen by an advisory board consisting of Harris, alumni, Texas A&M faculty, and industry experts. The Titans Fraternity is operated by the Titans Alumni Network.

== Membership ==
Membership is exclusive, but applications are open to all majors, gender, race, and religion. Each semester, 15 slots per chapter are competed for. Requirements include: resume, essays, interviews with alumni, and up to nine nominations. Membership is free courtesy of over 80 individual and corporate sponsors.

Applicants are vetted for the following qualities:

1. Likely to be successful early in career
2. Have the character to use whatever success they do achieve for the benefit of others
3. Interesting and fully engaged people — Britt Harris believes “If you are extremely smart but only partially engaged, you will be outperformed by people who are sufficiently smart but fully engaged, and should be.”

== Course ==
Class is held once a week for two hours. It consists of professor led and class-directed instruction, alternating weekly.

The semester course consists of:

- Seven modules:
1. Long-term market characteristics
2. Market theory; efficient markets versus behavioral finance
3. Successful active management methods
4. Policy development
5. Hedge fund strategies
6. Emerging markets
7. Benjamin Franklin's Preeminence of Wisdom and the Rareness of an Intentional Life
- Review of seventeen Titans Briefs
- Creation of one Titans Brief
- Development and management of an active investment portfolio
- Weekly presentation and review of economic reports are presented each week
- Guest speakers
- Bi-weekly class dinners hosted by the Professor, Britt Harris

== Fraternity ==
Titans Fraternity is a professional fraternity (not a Greek social fraternity or honor society). Community is built among classmates during the Titans Course, and continued after graduation via the Titans Alumni Network. During the course, classmates engage in civil discourse and social interaction over dinner at the Titans Clubhouse. Annual dinners for all Titans are held in Austin, Dallas, Houston, New York, and London.

== Chapters ==
=== Texas A&M University ===
Titans was established at Texas A&M University in August 2006. It is hosted at Mays Business School and the semester course is FINC 427/669. As of May 2019, it has graduated 39 classes consisting of 701 Titans.

=== Baylor University ===
Titans was established at Baylor University in September 2016. It is hosted at Hankamer School of Business and the semester course is BU4M. As of October 2026, it has graduated 4 classes consisting of 51 Titans.

=== University of Texas at Austin ===
Titans was established at University of Texas at Austin in January 2018. It is hosted at McCombs Business School and the semester course is FIN 372. As of October 2026, it has graduated 15 classes consisting of 303 Titans.

== Notable alumni ==
Class	Chapter	Titan	Achievement	Reference(s)
Titans 19	A&M	Breeja Larson	4×100-meter medley relay 2012 Summer Olympics Gold Medalist	

== See also ==
- Harvard Student Agencies
- Yale Entrepreneurial Society
