= Thomas Britton Harris IV =

American investment officer (born 1958)

Britt Harris
- Born: Thomas Britton Harris IV; April 16, 1958 (age 68); Bryan, Texas, United States
- Education: Texas A&M University
- Occupation: Businessman
- Spouse: Julia Harris
- Children: 4

Thomas Britton "Britt" Harris IV (born April 16, 1958) was the chief investment officer of the University of Texas/Texas A&M Investment Management Company. The investment management company oversees the assets of the The University of Texas and Texas A&M University. In 2013 Harris was announced as the recipient of the aiCIO's Lifetime Achievement Award. He founded and has led Titans of Investing since 2006.

== Early life ==
Harris was born on 16 April 1958 in Bryan, Texas, United States. He graduated from Texas A&M University in 1980 with a bachelor's degree in finance.

== Career ==
Harris began his career at Texas Utilities, leaving to join Asea Brown Boveri. He was then named chief investment officer of Verizon Investment Management, Verizon Communications' employee benefit trust. He subsequently left Verizon to serve as the chief executive officer of Bridgewater Associates, at the time the largest hedge fund in the world. Upon Harris' departure from Bridgewater, Ray Dalio, the firm's founder and chief executive, noted that "Mr. Harris is a superstar, with an absolutely fantastic character. He's an industry leader." Harris was then appointed chief investment officer of the Teacher Retirement System of Texas (TRS), Texas' pension plan for public teachers. During Harris' tenure at TRS, the value of their pension fund grew from $67 billion in 2008 to $140 billion in 2017. On June 16, 2017, it was announced that Harris would be leaving his position at the Teacher Retirement System of Texas to become the new chief investment officer of the University of Texas/Texas A&M Investment Management Company (UTIMCO), an investment management company that oversees the assets of two of the largest public universities in the United States: Texas A&M University and the University of Texas. Harris began as chief investment officer of UTIMCO on August 1, 2017, and retired from UTIMCO on June 30, 2023.

Harris is a member of the President's Working Group on Financial Markets, the Federal Reserve Bank of New York's Investor Advisory Committee on Financial Markets, and has also served in several leadership positions in the investment community, including chairman of the Council for the Investment of Employee Benefit Assets and an advisor to the New York Stock Exchange. He is currently an executive professor of finance at Texas A&M University and has served as a guest lecturer on investment management and public policy at Harvard University, Princeton University, Yale University, and The University of Texas at Austin.

Harris has been listed as one of aiCIO's "most influential and powerful asset owners on earth" since the magazine's inaugural rankings in 2012. He was ranked 4th in 2012, 6th in 2013, 4th in both 2014 and 2015, and 2nd in both 2016 and 2017. Additionally, Harris was a participant in the 2012 Bilderberg Meetings.

Harris founded and leads Titans of Investing, a collegiate leadership program established in 2006. As of fall 2021, its alumni network consists of 700 Titan graduates from Texas A&M University and the University of Texas.

== Personal life ==
Harris is married and has four children. He currently lives in Austin, Texas and is an active member in the Christian community.
