= Greg Kwedar =

American film director and screenwriter

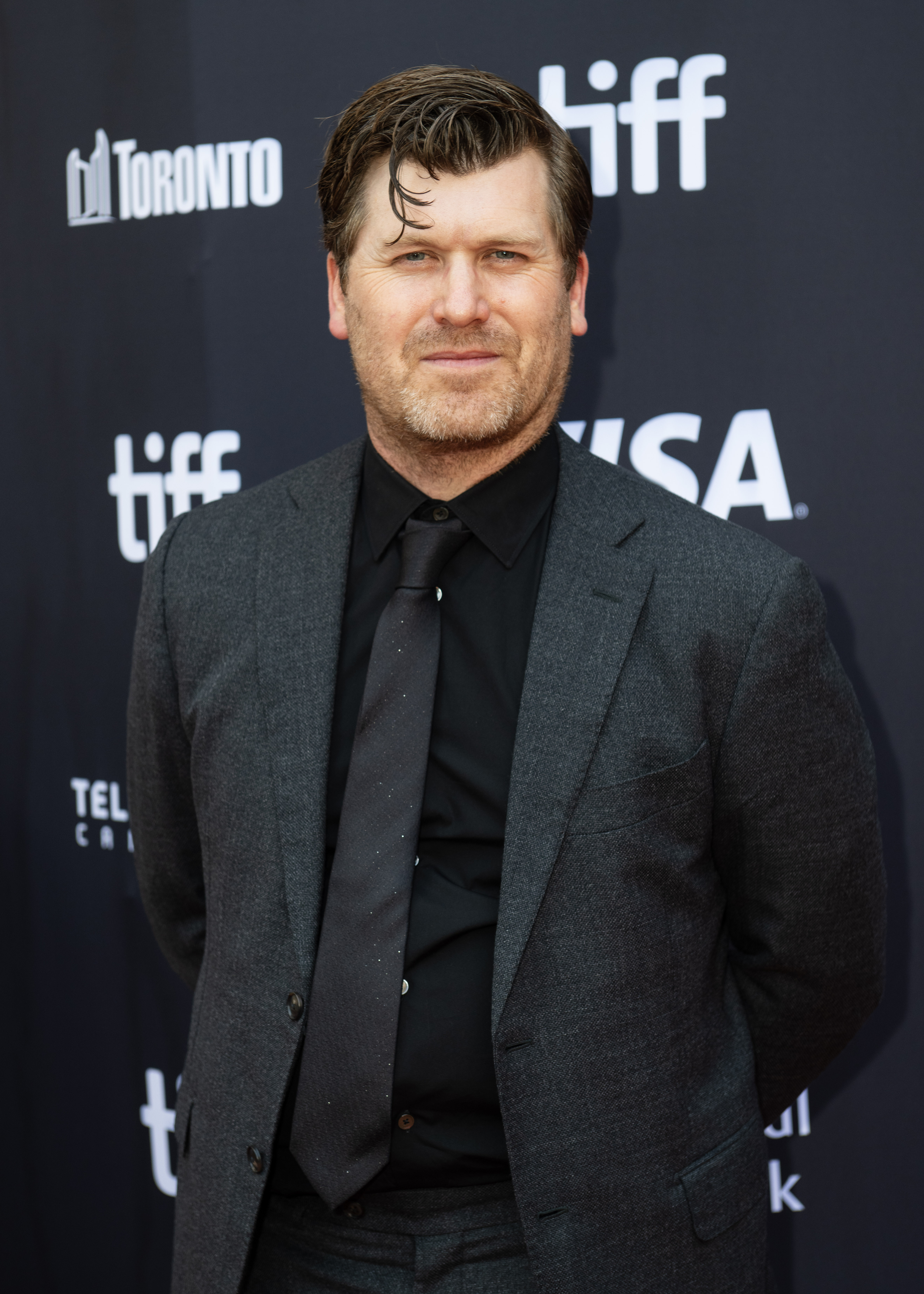
- Kwedar in 2025
- Born: c. 1984 or 1985 (age 40–41); Fort Worth, Texas, U.S.
- Education: Texas A&M University
- Occupations: Filmmaker; director; writer; producer
- Years active: 2016–present

Greg Kwedar (/ˈkwiːdɑːr/) is an American film director and screenwriter. Since graduating from Texas A&M in 2008, he is a full-time filmmaker based in Austin, Texas. He produced Rising From Ashes in 2012 and directed Transpecos in 2016.

In 2023, he directed the film Sing Sing, for which he was nominated for the Academy Award for Best Adapted Screenplay alongside Clint Bentley, Clarence Maclin, and John "Divine G" Whitfield. He also co-wrote the screenplay for 2025 film Train Dreams, which was nominated for the Academy Award for Best Picture and garnered him and Bentley another nomination for Best Adapted Screenplay in 2026.

== Early life and education ==
Greg Kwedar was born in Fort Worth, Texas. He attended Trinity Valley School and graduated in 2003. Recruited to play rugby for Texas A&M, he majored in accounting at Mays Business School and enrolled in the university's Professional Program of Accounting (PPA). While in college, he became a Mays Business School Fellow and served as the president of the Business Student Council.

After realizing mid-exam that accounting was not his calling, Kwedar walked out of the exam, dropped out of the PPA program, and began exploring more creative career opportunities. Kwedar stayed a fifth year at Texas A&M to earn a master's degree in marketing and apply for film schools. During this year, he worked at the university's marketing and communications department to expand his film portfolio. He also volunteered at a nonprofit at the Mexico–United States border; the time inspired what would later become his debut feature film, Transpecos (2016). After graduating from Texas A&M in 2008, he turned down a graduate school offer from New York University and moved to Austin, Texas to pursue filmmaking full-time.

== Career ==
Upon his arrival in Austin, Kwedar began working as a writer and director at studio One Spark Films. He worked as a producer on the 2012 documentary Rising From Ashes, a film about the creation of Rwandan's first national cycling team in the wake of the Rwandan genocide.

In 2016, Kwedar made his directorial feature film debut with Transpecos, a film he directed, produced, and co-wrote with Clint Bentley. The film, based on Kwedar's experiences volunteering on the US-Mexican border, was released to positive reviews from critics. John DeFore of The Hollywood Reporter wrote: "Artfully made but wholly accessible for a mainstream audience, it features strong performances but no names in the cast who'll draw attention on their own."

Kwedar next worked as a producer on Running with Beto, a documentary film following Beto O'Rourke's 2018 campaign for the Texas Senate against Ted Cruz. The film debuted at the 2019 South by Southwest (SXSW) Film Festival in Austin and won SXSW's Audience Award for documentaries. Running with Beto premiered on HBO on 28 May 2019.

In 2021, Kwedar collaborated again with Bentley to write and produce Jockey. Centered on an aging athlete, the drama starred Clifton Collins Jr., Molly Parker, and Moisés Arias. The film took three years to write, and was shot in 20 days. The film premiered at the 2021 Sundance Film Festival, and later played at over 30 festivals globally. On 30 January 2021, Sony Pictures Classics acquired Jockey for worldwide distribution.

The success of Kwedar's previous films led to production beginning on his sophomore feature film, Sing Sing. Kwedar directed, produced, and co-wrote the film (again with Bentley). Sing Sing premiered in the Special Presentations program at the 2023 Toronto International Film Festival and won the 2024 SXSW Festival Audience Award. It was then acquired by A24 and released in the United States on July 12, 2024. The film was met with critical acclaim. It was named one of the top ten films of 2024 by the National Board of Review and the American Film Institute and amassed multiple accolades, including three nominations at the 78th British Academy Film Awards and three nominations at the 97th Academy Awards (including Best Adapted Screenplay).

Kwedar co-wrote the screenplay with Clint Bentley for their next film, Train Dreams, adapting it from the 2011 novella of the same name by Denis Johnson. Starring Joel Edgerton, the film premiered at the 2025 Sundance Film Festival and was acquired for a streaming release by Netflix. The film premiered on Netflix on November 7, 2025 to critical acclaim. Metacritic's weighted average gave the film a score of 88 out of 100, based on 43 critics. Roxana Hadadi, in an article for the Vulture, wrote that "[Bentley and Kwedar] pull out and emphasize the novella’s driving idea — that all of us will eventually be forgotten — and use it to ask how we should live our lives before that inevitable insignificance." Writing for RogerEbert.com, Brian Tallerico described the film as "a meditation on the beauty of everyone and everything", and stated that "the reason it's one of the best [films] of the year is how [Bentley] threads the needle between brutal reality and wistful poetry." Train Dreams received four nominations at the 98th Academy Awards, including Best Picture and Best Adapted Screenplay. Kwedar and Bentley were honored with the 2025 Writer's Writer Award from the Austin Film Festival for their work on the film.

On 5 September 2025, Deadline announced that Charles Melton, Rachel Brosnahan and Will Poulter would star in Kwedar's upcoming third feature film, Saturn Return. On 7 July 2026, Deadline announced that Dwayne Johnson would star in Free Byrd, an upcoming action-drama film directed by Kwedar. The film is centered around a motorcycle stuntman who hides his diagnosis of dementia from his family in favor of one final jump.

== Ethos ==
In 2024, Kwedar and Bentley co-founded Ethos, a film production company that promotes an equitable financing model for independent filmmakers. In an interview with The Hollywood Reporter, Kwedar described how under this model, all members of the cast and crew are paid the exact same wage, and each member shares in the equity of the film's final performance. "When I came into the business," he stated, "one thing I was very aware of was just the lack of transparency and therefore, a growing mistrust on behalf of all the people involved in making the film." Kwedar first pioneered the model with Bentley while making Jockey, and scaled up the model on Sing Sing with success.

In 2026, Ethos signed a first-look deal with Netflix. Under the terms, Netflix will provide funding for the development and production of films created under the Ethos banner (Kwedar's films, as well as those by Ethos' other filmmakers) and a release on Netflix. Netflix’s head of film acquisitions, Sean Berney, stated that, “I’ve been fortunate to cross paths with so many gifted filmmakers at festivals and markets, Clint [Bentley] and Greg [Kwedar] among them. What really stood out to me when working with them, aside from their raw talent, was how genuinely invested we both are in nurturing the next wave of filmmakers and giving them a real chance to make their mark.”

== Filmmaking style ==
Kwedar tends to focus on heroism and the capacity of humanity to find the good in dark situations. Sadie Dean from Script Magazine wrote that Kwedar's Sing Sing "gives us an inside glimpse of what good can be done when we come together with compassion."

Kwedar's films also tend to focus on detail, character development, and worldbuilding. In a Vanity Fair interview with Kwedar to discuss Sing Sing, David Canfield describes how Kwedar keeps the camera locked in on the actors' faces. "[Cinematographer] Pat Scola was like, "Oh, this is a movie about the landscape of the human face,"" Kwedar stated, continuing "What happens when you look someone in the eyes, in an unflinching way? What stories does the face tell?" In a review for The New Yorker, Justin Chang wrote, "Bentley and Kwedar have, fundamentally, a carpenter’s approach to cinema. They offer the promise and pleasure of handcrafted art, but with every rough edge sanded down, every surface given a soulful coat of varnish."

== Filmography ==
=== Feature films ===
Year	Title	Director	Writer	Producer	Ref.
2016	Transpecos	Yes	Yes	Yes	
2021	Jockey	No	Yes	Yes	
2023	Sing Sing	Yes	Yes	Yes	
2025	Train Dreams	No	Yes	No	
2027	Saturn Return	Yes	Yes	No	
TBA	Free Byrd	Yes	Yes	Yes	

=== Documentaries produced ===
- Rising from Ashes (2012)
- Running with Beto (2019)

== Awards and nominations ==
Award	Date of ceremony	Category	Nominated work	Result	Ref.
Academy Awards	March 2, 2025	Best Adapted Screenplay	Sing Sing	Nominated	
Academy Awards	March 15, 2026	Best Adapted Screenplay	Train Dreams	Nominated	
BAFTA Awards	February 16, 2025	Best Adapted Screenplay	Sing Sing	Nominated	
Critics' Choice Movie Awards	January 12, 2025	Best Adapted Screenplay	Sing Sing	Nominated	
Critics' Choice Movie Awards	January 4, 2026	Best Adapted Screenplay	Train Dreams	Nominated	
Film Independent Spirit Awards	March 6, 2022	John Cassavetes Award	Jockey	Nominated	
Film Independent Spirit Awards	February 22, 2025	Best Feature	Sing Sing	Nominated	
Gotham Awards	December 1, 2025	Best Adapted Screenplay	Train Dreams	Nominated	
Satellite Awards	January 26, 2025	Best Director	Sing Sing	Nominated	
Satellite Awards	January 26, 2025	Best Adapted Screenplay	Sing Sing	Nominated	
Satellite Awards	March 8, 2026	Best Adapted Screenplay	Train Dreams	Nominated	
