= Running with Beto =

- Directed by: David Modigliani
- Starring: Beto O'Rourke
- Music by: David Garza
- Country of origin: United States
- Original language: English

Production
- Producers: David Modigliani; Rebecca Feferman; Nancy Schafer; Rachel Ecklund; Greg Kwedar; Michelle Modigliani
- Cinematography: Ellie Ann Fenton, Kelly West
- Editors: Penelope Falk, David Bartner
- Running time: 94 minutes
- Production companies: Live Action Projects; Crooked Media; HBO Documentary Films

Original release
- Network: HBO
- Release: May 28, 2019

Running with Beto is a 2019 documentary film following Beto O'Rourke's campaign in the 2018 United States Senate election in Texas. The film debuted at the 2019 South by Southwest (SXSW) Film Festival where it won the Audience Award, and premiered on HBO on May 28, 2019.
