= The Washington Campus =

American-based consortium based in Washington DC

Coordinates: 38°54′1.3″N 77°1′50.3″W

- Type: Public
- Established: 1978
- Students: 1500 per year
- Location: Washington, D.C., U.S.
- Campus: Urban
- Colors: Blue and Gray
- Website: washcampus.edu

The Washington Campus (TWC) is a non-profit, non-partisan, higher education consortium based in Washington, D.C. Consortium members and other partnering institutions include some of the world's leading universities and business schools. The Washington Campus was founded in December 1978 and held its first executive and academic programs in 1979. The lead founder of the consortium, L. William Seidman, was the former economic advisor to President Gerald Ford and the 14th Chairman of the Federal Deposit Insurance Corporation.

The Washington Campus states that its mission is to help executives and students better understand the interactions of business, government, and public policy, with the goal of enhancing their effectiveness as organizational leaders. It offers a variety of experiential programs and credit-granting courses related to management education.

Approximately 1,500 participants take part in programs with The Washington Campus each year. Programs are created for and attended by Master of Business Administration (MBA) and Executive MBA students, as well as graduate accounting and select honors undergraduate students. Students from other graduate and professional schools also frequently participate in Campus programs for academic credit. This includes both joint degree students (e.g., JD-MBA, MD-MBA), as well as students from medical and law school, and from schools and programs such as Master of Public Policy and Master of Public Administration, Master of Public Health and Master of Health Administration, Master of Finance, and many other specialty masters programs.

== Consortium universities ==
The Washington Campus comprises 17 leading graduate business schools:

- W. P. Carey School of Business – Arizona State University
- Haas School of Business – University of California, Berkeley
- UCLA Anderson School of Management – University of California, Los Angeles
- Goizueta Business School – Emory University
- Warrington College of Business – University of Florida
- Seidman College of Business – Grand Valley State University
- School of Business – Howard University
- Kelley School of Business – Indiana University
- The Stephen M. Ross School of Business – University of Michigan
- The Anderson School of Management – University of New Mexico
- Kenan-Flagler Business School – The University of North Carolina at Chapel Hill
- D'Amore-McKim School of Business – Northeastern University
- Max M. Fisher College of Business – Ohio State University
- Krannert School of Management – Purdue University
- Jones Graduate School of Business – Rice University
- McCombs School of Business – The University of Texas at Austin
- Mays Business School – Texas A&M University
- And many other program partners worldwide

== History ==
After serving in the White House as President Gerald Ford's Assistant for Economic Affairs from 1974 to 1977, Bill Seidman, along with other notable public policy officials and academic leaders, saw the need for current and future business executives to have a much better understanding of the dynamics of government and public policy, especially the impact on their businesses, industries, and on the economy overall. Business leaders needed to better understand the organization and function of government, as well as, the policy making process, in order to more effectively contribute their experience and expertise to the decision-making process. With the policy challenges confronting government officials, and the potential impact of policy decisions on the U.S. and global business climate and economy, the founders determined that it is critical for corporate leaders to engage in the process, inform the policy debate and understand the potential impact of policy changes on their own business sector.

Shortly after leaving his post at the White House, Seidman, along with colleagues from the Ford administration and other leaders in Washington set about organizing the foundation for the Campus. By the fall of 1978, the Campus consortium included nine member schools: University of California, Los Angeles; University of California, Berkeley; University of Michigan; Cornell University; Dartmouth College; Ohio State University; Grand Valley State University; the University of New Mexico; and Indiana University. The first Board of Directors meeting was held in 1979 at The Wye Plantation in Queenstown, Maryland. Since that time, the Campus has grown in size, membership and scope, and continues to add new universities to its consortium membership.

The original signers of the Articles of Incorporation are: L. William Seidman, Hugh Scott, William F. Gorog, Sidney L. Jones, James T. Lynn, Harlan Cleveland, Roger B. Porter, and John J. Bell.

In 2012, The Washington Campus moved into their current location, at the L. William and Sally Seidman Center in downtown Washington, D.C.Although many sessions throughout each residency program are conducted in offices on Capitol Hill, and in departments and agencies such as the Federal Reserve or the Treasury Department, the center serves as the primary location for students when they are in Washington.

== Administration and organization ==
=== Mission ===
The mission of The Washington Campus is to provide executive and business students with opportunities to gain a deeper understanding of the complex interactions among business, government, and public policy, thereby enhancing their effectiveness as organizational leaders. Through a diverse range of experiential programs and credit-bearing courses, The Washington Campus plays a unique and essential role in advancing management education.

In speaking about the Washington Campus program in 2003 at the 25th anniversary dinner for the consortium, Vice President Dick Cheney underscored the importance and value of the Campus, stating that "it exposed future business leaders to the work of government. And that exposure, we think, is absolutely vital. I think oftentimes when business executives and government officials meet, they often end up talking past each other. Neither understands the other very well, sometimes. Many business executives don't begin to understand the constraints and pressures that policymakers face when they have to make a decision or evaluate a proposal. And for their part, many government officials have never met a payroll, have never run a business, have never had to deal with government regulations on the receiving end. They have no concept of what the world of business is really like, and not all of them understand the importance of free markets, low taxes, and creating an environment in which businesses and entrepreneurs can take risk and invest in new technologies, and hire more people. That's why the Washington Campus program has been so important. They're helping bridge that gap between the world of business and the world of politics. Business leaders learn to see the world as Washington policymakers see it, and policymakers often gain a better understanding of the realities of business life.”

=== Governing bodies ===
The Campus is governed by a Board of Directors composed of representatives from the consortium member schools as well as business and government leaders in Washington. The president and CEO is the day-to-day administrator of the Campus and is appointed by the Board of Directors. Board members representing consortium member schools are nominated by their respective schools and largely serve as Deans or in other leadership positions at their universities. All member schools are allowed representation on the Board. At-Large Members are nominated and approved by the Board.

== Academics ==
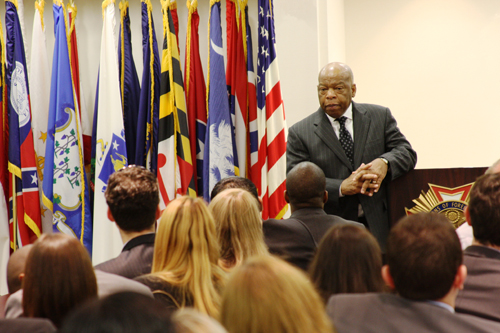
Congressman John Lewis speaking to a group of MBA students from the Washington Campus.

The Washington Campus' MBA courses are intensive, five-day programs held in Washington, D.C., that provides participants with first-hand exposure to the decision-making processes in federal government and an understanding of how they impact business. Class discussion is generally led by a key faculty member, joined by guest lecturers from government, politics, business, and the media. All lecturers are guest speakers drawn from the highest ranks of government (such as members of Congress and current and former Executive Branch officials), the media, business and academia. Students often have the opportunity to speak directly with a key editor of The Washington Post, a special advisor to the White House, or a representative of the World Bank; or they may sit in on a lecture of a professor from Harvard Kennedy School at Harvard University. Students from member schools receive graduate credit for participating in the programs.

The programs are guided by the academic standards set forth by the graduate business schools represented on their Board of Directors. Educational programs bring participants face-to-face with experienced policymakers, senior policy advisors, and experts in public relations and advocacy who explain how Washington works, how decisions get made, and who controls each step of the process.

Program sessions are taught in the Washington Campus conference center, as well as in off-site locations such as: Congressional Committee conference rooms on Capitol Hill, Representative and Senators' offices, the US Capitol, House and Senate galleries, the Federal Reserve, the US Treasury, the US Chamber of Commerce, the Supreme Court of the United States, embassies and many other agencies and departments. Program sessions taught off-site relate to the speakers for each program and programs vary accordingly. The academic model for the Washington Campus is to use the city of Washington D.C. as the “campus” and leaders in Washington as the faculty.

The Campus maintains a network of experts across all areas of the government, who lecture on subjects including:

=== Government leadership ===
- The White House;
- Congress;
- Departments and Agencies;

=== Public relations ===
- Press and the Media;
- Lobbying and Advocacy Strategies;

=== Finance ===
- US Budget;
- US Economy;
- US Debt and the Deficit;
- Banking;
- Securities;
- Tax Code;
- Regulatory Oversight;
- The Regulatory Process;

=== Business and international policy ===
- Corporate Business;
- Corporate Responsibility;
- Trade Policy;
- The Regulatory Process;
- International Policy;
- EU Relations;
- The European Union;
- US-China Relations;

=== Medical policy ===
- Pharmaceutical Drug Regulation;
- Health Care Policy;
- The Regulatory Process;

=== Technology policy ===
- Science and Technology Policy;
- Telecommunications Policy;

=== Energy and environmental policy ===
- Energy Policy;
- Environmental Policy;
- Green Building;

=== Education policy ===
- Education Policy;

=== Defense policy ===
- Defense and Homeland Security.
- National Security and Central Intelligence
- Foreign Military Policy

== Student activities ==
The Washington Campus holds sessions at many historical locations throughout each program. Typically, MBA students will have program sessions on Capitol Hill, attend congressional hearings, visit one of the agencies such as the U.S. Treasury or the Federal Reserve, and attend a luncheon/panel discussion at the National Press Club or the Capitol Hill Club. Corporate and EMBA programs are often customized for clients and sessions and locations vary accordingly. Program sessions on Capitol Hill often begin with a congressional staffer discussing the roll of staff in working for a senator, a member of congress or a congressional committee. These sessions are usually held in a Committee Hearing Room in either the House or the Senate. Following discussion by congressional staff, a sitting Congressman or Senator will discuss the life of an elected official and will discuss pressing issues that they are currently facing. For many participants, these discussions help bridge the gap between the world of business and the world of politics. Participants are also provided the opportunity to sit-in on Congressional Hearings.

Federal Reserve Economist James A. Clouse speaking to students from The Washington Campus.

Witnessing a live hearing provides participants a first-hand perspective of the process by which legislation is created and shaped. While visiting the U.S. Treasury, program sessions include a tour of the Treasury Building as well as instruction by a senior official. Similarly, while visiting the Federal Reserve, participants receive a short tour of the Federal Reserve Eccles building before sitting down to listen to a program session taught by a senior Fed official. Program sessions at social clubs such as the National Press Club or the Capitol Hill Club include a reception or a luncheon where participants eat dinner while listening to a panel discussion by Campus speakers.

Part of the learning experience in The Washington Campus program is spending time in Washington. To make the most of this experience, the Campus encourages participants to explore the city of Washington in their free time and facilitates tours and other visits on request. Many participants choose to extend their stay in Washington to take full advantage of all the city has to offer. A favorite pastime of people visiting Washington is touring the many monuments to America's founding fathers. Many of the more recognizable monuments, including the Washington Monument and the Lincoln Memorial are situated along the National Mall. The White House is also adjacent to the National Mall and tours of the White House can be arranged through Congressional offices or with the help of The Washington Campus staff.

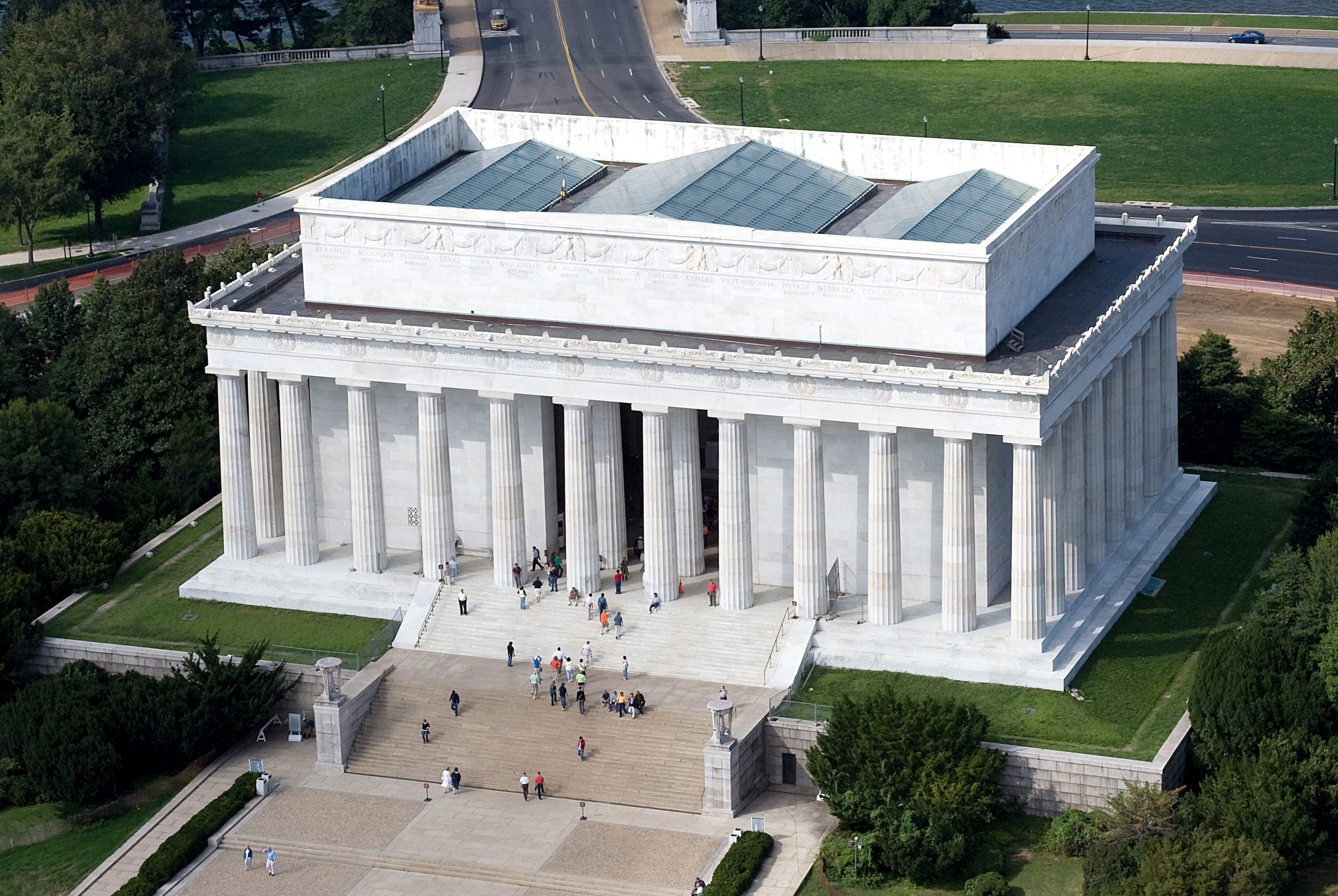
An aerial view of the Lincoln Memorial.

== Faculty, notable speakers and alumni ==
- William R. Archer, Jr., former U.S. House Representative (R-TX), former chairman, House Committee on Ways and Means
- Melissa Bean, U.S. House Representative (D-IL)
- Ben Bernanke, chairman of the U.S. Federal Reserve
- Kevin Brady, U.S. House Representative (R-TX)
- Ms. Donna Brazile, chairwoman of the Democratic National Committee
- John Breaux, former U.S. Senator (R-LA)
- Sherrod Brown, United States Senator (D-OH)
- Nora Mead Brownell, co-founder, ESPY Energy Solutions, former FERC commissioner
- Sharon Brown-Hruska, former chairman, Commodity Futures Trading Commission (CFTC)
- Bay Buchanan, former treasurer of the United States
- Richard Burr, United States Senator (R-NC)
- Milton Robert Carr, U.S. House of Representative (D-MI)
- Mr. Thomas Carr, founding director of the White House Fellows program
- Saxby Chambliss, United States Senator (R-GA)
- Vice President Richard Bruce "Dick" Cheney, 46th vice president of the United States
- Emanuel Cleaver II, U.S. House Representative (D-MO)
- Max Cleland, Secretary, American Battle Monuments Commission, former U.S. Senator (D-Georgia)
- Larry Combest, former U.S. House Representative (R-TX), former chairman of House Intelligence Committee, former chairman of House Agriculture Committee
- Bob Dole, United States Senator (R-KS)
- David Dreier, U.S. House Representative (R-CA)
- Chet Edwards, former U.S. House Representative (D-TX)
- Marvin H. “Mickey” Edwards, director, Rodel Public Leadership Program, Aspen Institute, former U.S. House Representative (R-OK)
- Stuart E. Eizenstat, former Deputy Secretary of the Treasury, former Under Secretary of State
- Bob Etheridge, U.S. House Representative (D-NC)
- Jeff Flake, U.S. House Representative (R-AZ)
- Mr. Malcolm Stevenson "Steve" Forbes Jr., editor in chief of Forbes magazine
- Barney Frank, U.S. House Representative (D-MA)
- Gregory Garcia, assistant secretary for cyber security and communications, U.S. Department of Homeland Security
- David Gergen, director for the Center for Public Leadership, Harvard Kennedy School, Harvard University
- Lyle Gramley, former member of the board of governors of the U.S. Federal Reserve
- Ambassador Marc Ginsberg, senior pice president, APCO Worldwide, former U.S. Ambassador to Morocco
- Cynthia Glassman, Undersecretary of Economic Affairs, U.S. Department of Commerce, former Commissioner, U.S. Securities and Exchange Commission (SEC)
- Louie Gohmert, U.S. House Representative (R-TX)
- Bill Gradison, board member, Public Company Accounting Oversight Board, former U.S. House Representative (R-OH)
- Sam Graves, U.S. House Representative (R-MO)
- Alan Greenspan, former chairman of the U.S. Federal Reserve
- Martin Gruenberg, vice-chairman, Federal Deposit Insurance Corporation (FDIC)
- Keith Hall, Commissioner, Bureau of Labor Statistics, U.S. Department of Labor
- Steven B. Harris, board member of the Public Company Accounting Oversight Board
- Martin Heinrich, U.S. House Representative (D-NM)
- Robert Hunter, senior advisor, The RAND Corporation, former Ambassador to NATO, former director, Middle East Affairs, U.S. National Security
- William M. Isaac, chairman, LECG Global Financial Services, former chairman, Federal Deposit Insurance Corporation (FDIC)
- Johnny Isakson, United States Senator (R-GA)
- Diane Auer Jones, former assistant secretary for postsecondary education
- Sidney L. Jones, former Assistant Secretary of the Treasury for Economic Policy, U.S. Department of Treasury
- John Kerry, United States Senator (D-MA), chairman, senate Foreign Relations Committee
- Jon Kyl, United States Senator (R-AZ)
- Barbara Lee, U.S. House Representative (D-CA)
- Carl Levin, United States Senator (D-MI)
- John Lewis, U.S. House Representative (D-GA)
- Eugene Ludwig, managing partner, Promontory Interfinancial Network, former Comptroller of the Currency
- Stephen F. Lynch, U.S. House Representative (D-MA)
- John McCain, United States Senator (R-AZ)
- James P. McGovern, U.S. House Representative (D-MA)
- Harry Mitchell, U.S. House Representative (R-AZ)
- Vice President Walter Mondale, 42nd vice president of the United States
- Patrick Mulloy, commissioner, U.S.-China Economic and Security Review Commission
- Brad Miller, U.S. House Representative (D-NC)
- Eleanor Holmes Norton, United States Representative (D-DC)
- Norman J. Ornstein, resident scholar at the American Enterprise Institute
- Ed Pastor, U.S. House Representative (R-AZ)
- Mr. Ramesh Ponnuru, senior editor for the National Review
- Roger B. Porter, former assistant to the President for economic and domestic policy
- Jack Reed, United States Senator (D-RI)
- Donald W. Riegle, Jr., former United States Senator (D-MI)
- Alice Rivlin, former vice chairman of the Federal Reserve
- Mr. Steven V. Roberts, former White House and Congressional correspondent, The New York Times
- Timothy J. Roemer, U.S. Ambassador to India, former U.S. House Representative (D-IN)
- Steven R. Rothman, U.S. House Representative (D-NJ)
- Donald Henry Rumsfeld, former U.S. Secretary of Defense
- L. William Seidman, founder of the Washington Campus, former chairman, Federal Deposit Insurance Corporation
- Christopher Shays, former U.S. House Representative (R-CT)
- Debbie Stabenow, United States Senator (D-Michigan), chair of Senate Committee on Agriculture
- Charlie Stenholm, former U.S. House Representative (D-TX)
- Branko Terzic, executive director, Deloitte Center for Energy Solutions, former commissioner of the Federal Energy Regulatory Commission (FERC)
- Jim Turner, former U.S. House Representative (D-TX)
- David Walker, former United States Comptroller General
- Diane E. Watson, former U.S. House Representative (D-CA), former chair of Congressional Entertainment Industries Caucus
- Heather A. Wilson, U.S. House Representative (R-NM)
