= Murray Barrick =

American academic

- Spouse: Sarah Barrick
- Children: 2

Academic background
- Education: BA, Business Management & Psychology, 1980, University of Northern Iowa; MA, Industrial/Organizational Psychology, 1986, PhD, Industrial/Organizational Psychology, 1988, University of Akron
- Thesis: The effect of environmental context and organizational capabilities on business-level strategies (1988)

Academic work
- Institutions: Texas A&M University; University of Iowa

Murray R. Barrick is a Distinguished University Professor and the Robertson Chair in Business at the Mays Business School at Texas A&M University.

== Early life and education ==
Barrick completed his Bachelor of Arts degree in Business Management and Psychology from the University of Northern Iowa before enrolling at University of Akron for his Master's degree and PhD in Industrial/Organizational Psychology.

== Career ==
Upon graduating from the University of Akron, Barrick joined the faculty at the University of Iowa. As an assistant professor of management and organizations, he was the recipient of a 1992 American Academy of Management Award for their research into the effectiveness of personality traits as predictors of job performance. He was later one of 70 faculty members awarded a 1995-96 Semester Assignment to "write scholarly works and textbooks, to develop new research techniques and skills, to collaborate with colleagues." Barrick was recruited by Purdue University to join their faculty but refused their offer.

Barrick eventually left the University of Iowa to become the Paul M. and Rosalie Robertson Chair in Business at Texas A&M University's Mays Business School in 2006. The following year, he was appointed the head of the Department of Management, replacing R. Duane Ireland. While serving in these roles, Barrick was named one of two recipients of the 2008 Distinguished Scientific Contributions Award from the Society for Industrial and Organizational Psychology for his "distinguished empirical and/or theoretical scientific contributions to the field of industrial and organizational psychology." In 2010, Barrick was elected a Fellow of the Academy of Management as someone who has made significant contributions to the science and practice of management. He also serves on various editorial boards including the Journal of Applied Psychology, Personnel Psychology, and Academy of Management Journal.
