= Seidman College of Business =

Business school of Grand Valley State University

Coordinates: 42°57′41.9″N 85°40′45.0″W

- Type: Public
- Established: 1970
- Dean: Diana Lawson
- Faculty: 91
- Undergraduates: 3,433
- Postgraduates: 349
- Location: Grand Rapids, Michigan, United States
- Campus: urban
- Website: https://www.gvsu.edu/seidman

The Seidman College of Business is an American business school operated by Grand Valley State University. The college is named after Francis E. Seidman, one of the principal founders of the BDO Seidman accounting firm and the father of businessman (and later FDIC Chairman) L. William Seidman, who helped found GVSU. The college is located at GVSU's Pew Grand Rapids campus in downtown Grand Rapids.

It offers bachelor's and master's degrees with several degree options. The college is a part of The Washington Campus which is a consortium of business schools that was established by L. William Seidman in 1978.

== History ==
The Seidman College of Business began in 1970 as the School of Business and Economics. In 1973, through a generous donation by the Seidman Family Foundation, the F.E. Seidman Graduate College was formed. Seidman expanded again in 1979 when the undergraduate and graduate programs were merged into one place, the Seidman College. After a university restructuring, Seidman College was renamed the Seidman School of Business in 1983. Finally, in July 2004, Seidman was given its current title, the Seidman College of Business.

== Programs ==
U.S. News & World Report lists Seidman as a "Best Undergraduate Business Program" as well as ranking the Part-time MBA.

Seidman College offers students graduate programs in Master of Business Administration (MBA), Master of Science in Accounting (MSA), and Master of Science in Taxation (MST). It also offers undergraduate programs in accounting, business economics, general business, finance, international business, management, marketing, and supply chain management.

== L. William Seidman Center ==
Beginning in the spring of 2011, the University broke ground on the $40 million L. William Seidman Center, named after one of the principal founders of GVSU, Bill Seidman. The center will house the Seidman College of Business in its entirety along with all of its outreach programs. The building will be four stories tall, consist of 110,000 square feet, and will be located on the GVSU Pew campus in downtown Grand Rapids. $25 million of the building is being funded with private donations, with the principal donor for the center being Richard DeVos, as well as other significant donors: Donald Rumsfeld and Henry Kissinger.

== Alumni ==
- Brian Calley - Michigan House of Representatives, American Banker, Republican politician, former Lieutenant Governor of Michigan

== See also ==
- List of business schools in the United States
- The Washington Campus
