= Chief Investment Officer Magazine =

News website

- aiCIO Spring 2011 Issue Cover
- Managing Editor: Christine Giordano
- Categories: Trade journal
- Frequency: Bi-monthly
- Circulation: 17,000 online, 10,000 print
- Publisher: Strategic Insight
- Founded: 2009
- Company: Asset International
- Country: United States
- Based in: New York City
- Language: English
- Website: Official website

Chief Investment Officer Magazine (formerly aiCIO) was an English-language international finance magazine. It is now just a website owned by Strategic Insight. In 2009, the magazine was honored with Folio's Silver Ozzie Award for "Best Design New Magazine, B-to-B". In 2011, the magazine was a finalist for the Jesse H. Neal Award, in the category recognizing Best Subject-Related Series of Articles for their entry, "Interrogations". CIO Magazine's work has also been excerpted in The Atlantic and referenced in New York Magazine.

The target readership for the magazine includes chief investment officers and senior investment professionals. The print and digital publication reports news, opinion, and research focusing on investment issues affecting pension, insurance, and sovereign wealth funds, as well as endowments and foundations. CIO is headquartered in New York City.

== Organizational history ==
Asset International was acquired in January 2009, by venture capital firm, Austin Ventures which sold to Genstar Capital in July 2014. Following the first acquisition, the firm was relocated from Connecticut to Manhattan. Offices are located in New York City, Hong Kong, Melbourne, London, and Stamford, Connecticut. The magazine changed its name to aiCIO from ai5000 in late 2010, to describe its audience by function (chief investment officers), as opposed to size (the 5,000 largest funds in the world, with the cutoff being around $1 billion), and again to CIO in 2014. The magazine is the sister publication of Global Custodian, PLANSPONSOR, planadvisor, and aiTrade. Leanna Orr took over for Paula Vasan as Managing Editor in March of 2013. Elizabeth Pfeuti serves as CIO's European Editor.

== Magazine structure ==
CIO's online news sections encompass alternatives, asset allocation, book reviews, deals, emerging markets, regulation, and risk management in the institutional investor space. Its magazine editions incorporate Features, Strategy & Tactics, an Interrogation section, which features first-person profiles with thought-leaders in the world of finance, and the Consultant Corner section. In September 2011, the publication published its first instance of proprietary data on the topic of risk parity.
