= William Muse =

American professor and dean (born 1939)

William Van Muse
- Born: April 7, 1939; Mississippi, US
- Occupations: Dean, chancellor, president, professor
- Board member of: TKE Education Foundation

Academic background
- Education: Northwestern State University; University of Arkansas

Academic work
- Institutions: Georgia Tech; Ohio University; Appalachian State University; University of Nebraska at Omaha; Texas A&M University; University of Akron; Auburn University; East Carolina University

William Van Muse (born April 7, 1939) is an American professor and dean. He is best known for serving as the President of the University of Akron from 1984 to 1992, of Auburn University from 1992 to 2001, and Chancellor of East Carolina University from 2001 to 2003.

== Early life and education ==
William Muse was born on 7 April, 1939 in Mississippi, United States. He received a B.S. in accounting from Northwestern State University in Louisiana, followed by an MBA and Ph.D. in Business and Administration from the University of Arkansas.

== Career ==
After graduation, Muse taught at Georgia Tech and Ohio University. He served as Dean of the business schools at Appalachian State University, the University of Nebraska at Omaha, and Texas A&M University. He also served as Vice-Chancellor at Texas A&M. He then served as the President of the University of Akron from 1984 to 1992, of Auburn University from 1992 to 2001, and Chancellor of East Carolina University from 2001 to 2003. In 2007, he worked with Michigan State University on a Kettering Foundation fellowship.

Muse has served as the International President of Tau Kappa Epsilon fraternity, Chairman of the Akron Regional Development Board, Director of National City Bank, President of the Southeastern Conference (SEC), Director of Southtrust Bank, the Alabama Power Company, and the American Cast Iron Pipe Company. He serves as the Vice-Chair of the United Way Foundation of Greater Cincinnati. He sits on the Board of the TKE Education Foundation. He is also an elected member of the National Issues Forums Institute.

Academic offices
Preceded by James E. Martin	President of Auburn University; 1992–2001	Succeeded by William F. Walker
