= Marec =

Marec may refer to:

- MAREC, a patent information query tool
- Michigan Alternative and Renewable Energy Center
- Pierre Marec (1759–1828), a French lawyer
- Marec, Belgian caricaturist for Dag Allemaal
- Marec, a populated place in Kosovo
