= Robert Pew =

American businessman

Robert Cunningham Pew II (June 4, 1923 – December 22, 2012) was an American businessman and chairman of Steelcase and played a role in Grand Valley State University's development in the 1980s. Pew joined Steelcase in 1952 and served as official chairman through 1974 until 1999. He became an official member of the GVSU board from 1985 to 1988. In the 1990s, Pew's organization became the world's largest producer and distributor of office furniture.

== Personal life ==
Pew was born in Syracuse, New York on June 4, 1923. He served in World War II in years 1942 and 1945 and completed over 50 missions as a fighter pilot captain.

In 1989, Ronald Reagan awarded Pew with the National Trust Historic Preservation Award. The following year, 1990, Forbes Magazine nominated Pew and his family as one of the world's 25 wealthiest families.

He died in Palm Beach, Florida on December 22, 2012. He died of natural causes, aged 89, preceded in death by his wife Mary Idema Pew, survived by sons Robert Cunningham Pew III and John, daughter Kate Wolters.
