= Annis Water Resources Institute =

Research organization

Coordinates: 43.232587°N 86.260378°W

The Robert B. Annis Water Resources Institute (AWRI), is located in Muskegon, Michigan at the Lake Michigan Center on Muskegon Lake. The mission of the Institute is to integrate research, education, and outreach to enhance and preserve freshwater resources. AWRI is a multidisciplinary research organization within the College of Liberal Arts and Sciences at Grand Valley State University. The Institute conducts research on water resources, including: ecosystem structure and function, contaminants and toxicology, hydrology, land use, watershed, stream, and wetland ecology, water quality, and basic and applied limnology.

== Facilities and equipment ==
Facilities within the Lake Michigan Center include classrooms, conference areas, analytical labs, research labs, mesocosms, dockage, and ship support and storage. The institute also owns and operates its own research vessels, the D.J. Angus and the W.G. Jackson. The D.J. Angus is a 45-foot vessel and weighs 22.5 tons; she is kept at Harbor Island in Grand Haven, Michigan. The W.G. Jackson is 64 feet and 10 inches long and weighs 68.5 tons; she is kept at the Lake Michigan Center in Muskegon.

AWRI received $500,000 in federal money to support a continuing $2 million expansion.
