= Kirkhof College of Nursing =

College in Michigan, U.S.

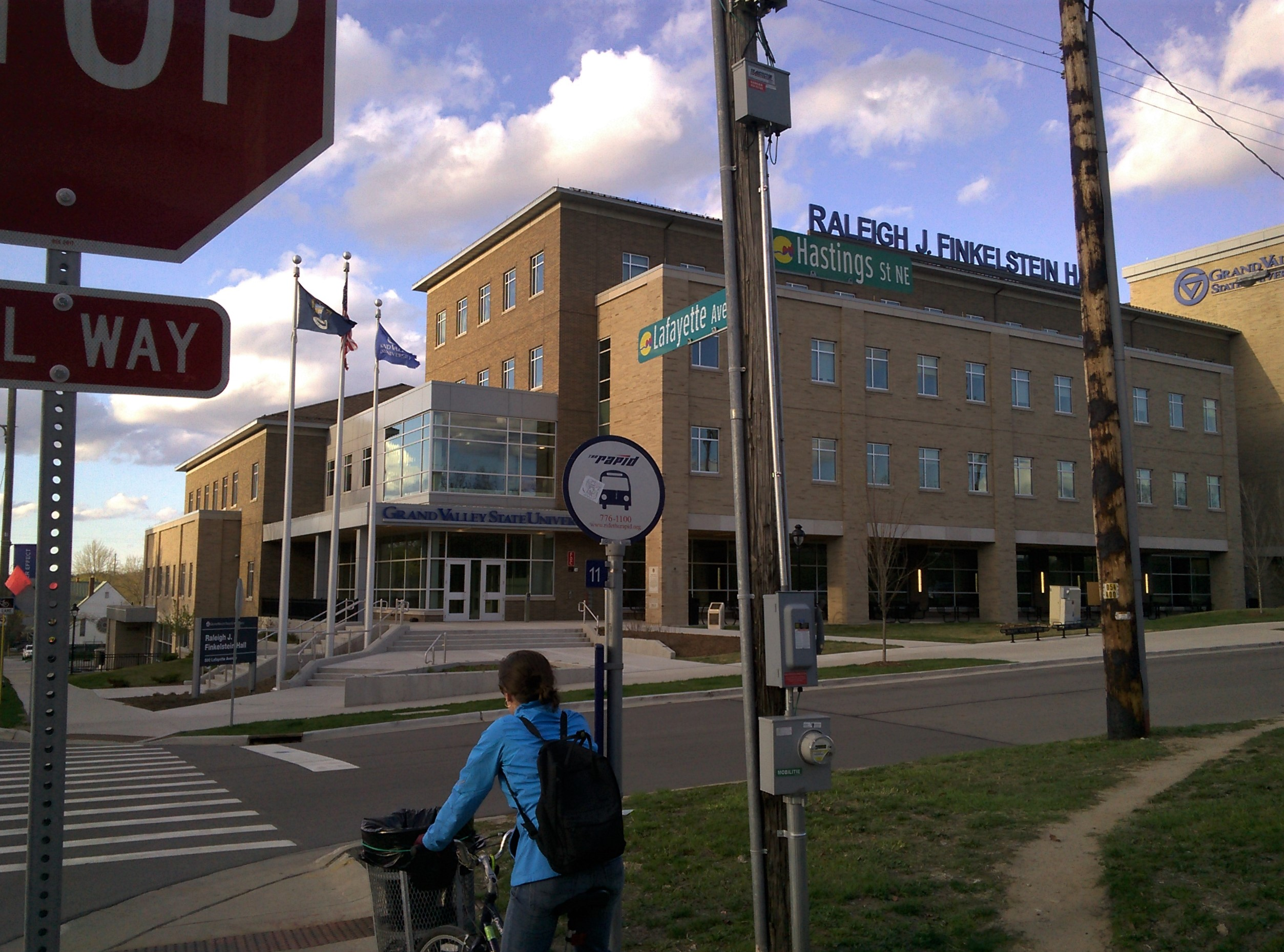
- Type: Public
- Established: 1973
- Dean: Linda Lewandowski
- Postgraduates: 481
- Location: Grand Rapids, Michigan, U.S. 42°58′14.5″N 85°39′41.0″W
- Campus: Urban
- Website: www.gvsu.edu/kcon/

The Kirkhof College of Nursing is located at Grand Valley State University in Grand Rapids, Michigan, United States.
