= National Trumpet Competition =

US youth music competition

The National Trumpet Competition, or NTC, is an annual music competition for students in the US that usually takes place in mid-March. The competition includes classical and jazz categories for students ranging from secondary education until postgraduate college. Students can perform solo or with an ensemble representing their school. NTC was formerly held at George Mason University until 2013; then moved to Messiah College in 2014 and 2015, Columbus State University in 2016, Metropolitan State University in 2017, University of North Texas in 2018, and University of Kentucky in 2019. It was hosted again March 2024 at Texas A&M University-Kingsville, and Texas Christian University in 2025.

== Applications ==
Students can register by completing an online form at the competition website, as well as attaching a link to a YouTube or Vimeo video of them performing only a published (including a self-published) composition from the trumpet repertoire, with piano accompaniment. They must also send in an application fee, and an NTC pianist fee (optional). Entrants are selected based on their videos, and are notified of results in mid-January.

== Semi-finals and finals ==
The competition was founded in 1991 by Dr. Dennis Edelbrock, who teaches trumpet at George Mason University in Fairfax, Virginia, and finals were held there through 2013.

Semi-finals and finals in each division are now held at the Schwob School of Music at Columbus State University. They are judged by professional trumpeters from around the area including Steven Hendrickson of the National Symphony Orchestra, Dr. Edelbrock, and members from Washington D.C.'s military bands. Depending on the division, there are about 25-50 competitors (except the junior division, which is usually smaller). After the first day, about five soloists and ensembles (although often ranging from 3 to 6) from each division move on to the finals, which usually take place a day or two later and at which one winner is chosen. Second and third place finalists usually also receive an award. The finalists have their finals audition posted on YouTube.

== Results ==
=== Ensemble Division ===
	1st place	2nd place	3rd place	4th place	Finalists
2023 Large Ensemble	University of North Texas	San Francisco Conservatory	University of Colorado Boulder
2023 Small Ensemble	University of Southern California	University of Colorado Boulder	Baylor University
2022 Large Ensemble	University of Colorado Boulder	Brigham Young University	Baylor University
2022 Small Ensemble	University of Colorado Boulder	San Francisco Conservatory	Indiana University
2019 Large Ensemble	University of Oklahoma	Oklahoma State University	Baylor University - Green
2019 Small Ensemble	Baylor University - Gold	Florida State University	San Francisco Conservatory
2018 Large Ensemble	Oklahoma State University	Baylor University (Green)	University of North Texas
2018 Small Ensemble	Baylor University (Gold)	University of Texas at Austin	Florida State University (Renegade)
2017 Large Ensemble	Baylor University - Green	Florida State University	Southern Methodist University
2017 Small Ensemble	University of Michigan	Cal State Long Beach	Cincinnati Conservatory of Music
2016 Large Ensemble	Oklahoma State University - Black	University of Texas at Austin	Central Michigan University
2016 Small Ensemble	Curtis Institute of Music	University of Kentucky	Eastman School of Music - 2
2015 Large Ensemble	Baylor University - Green	University of Miami	Oklahoma State University - Black
2015 Small Ensemble	Oklahoma State University - Orange	Southern Methodist University	Curtis Institute of Music
2014	Oklahoma State University - Orange	University of Kentucky	Baylor University - Gold	University of Massachusetts-Amherst	University of Georgia; Eastman School of Music
2013	Baylor University - Gold	Northwestern University	California State University Long Beach	Ithaca College	Baylor University - Green; Oklahoma State University - Orange
2012	Northwestern University	The Juilliard School	Baylor University - Gold	Indiana University	Florida State University; UCLA
2011	Baylor University - A	Florida State University	Indiana University	University of Kentucky - Blue	Baylor University - B University of Oklahoma; University of Southern Mississippi
2010	The Juilliard School	Indiana University - B	Grand Valley State University - A	University of Kentucky	Indiana University - A Peabody Institute; Sam Houston State University; University of Texas; Virginia Tech
2009	The Juilliard School	Northwestern University	Grand Valley State University	Baylor University	Boston University - A Boston University - B

=== Past solo winners ===
- James F. Burke (Musician) was declared national champion in 1939.
- James Peyden Shelton was awarded 1st place in the 2014 Graduate Soloist Division performing Joseph Turrin's Concerto for Trumpet and Orchestra.
- Natalie Dungey won the Junior division in 2009, when she was 10, with a performance of the Trumpet Concerto by Alexander Arutiunian that attracted international attention on YouTube.
- Chad Winkler won in 1995, 1998, and 2000.
- Caleb Hudson won in 2001 and 2004 and was part of the first-place Juilliard ensembles in 2009 and 2010.
- Olivier Anthony Theurillat was awarded 1st place in the highest soloist division in 1996.
- Charles Porter won in 1st place in classical college division in 1999 and 1st place in jazz college division in 2000.
- Daniel Choi won 1st place in the Junior Solo division in 2014, performing Johann Nepomuk Hummel's Concerto for Trumpet, 1st Movement.
