= Grand Valley State University =

Public university in Allendale, Michigan, US

Coordinates: 42°57′49″N 85°53′19″W

- Former name: Grand Valley State College (1960–1973) (1983–1987) Grand Valley State Colleges (1973–1983)
- Motto: Educating students to shape their lives, their professions, and their societies.
- Type: Public university
- Established: 1960; 66 years ago
- Academic affiliations: Space-grant
- Endowment: $231.3 million (2025)
- President: Philomena Mantella
- Provost: Jennifer A. Drake
- Faculty: 1,760
- Students: 22,011 (fall 2024)
- Undergraduates: 19,154 (fall 2025)
- Postgraduates: 2,881 (fall 2025)
- Location: Allendale & Grand Rapids, Michigan, United States
- Campus: Valley campus: suburban 1,322 acres (5.35 km^{2}) City Campus: urban 65 acres (0.26 km^{2}) Health Campus: urban 14.5 acres (0.059 km^{2})
- Colors: Blue, black, white
- Nickname: Lakers
- Sporting affiliations: NCAA Division II – GLIAC
- Mascot: Louie the Laker
- Website: gvsu.edu

Grand Valley State University (GVSU, GV, or Grand Valley) is a public university in Allendale, Michigan, United States. It was established in 1960 as Grand Valley State College. Its main campus is situated on 1,322 acres (5.35 km^{2}) approximately 12 miles (19 km) west of Grand Rapids. The university also features campuses in Grand Rapids and Holland and regional centers in Battle Creek, Detroit, Muskegon, and Traverse City.

GVSU enrolled more than 22,000 students as of fall 2025 from 82 of 83 Michigan counties and dozens of other states and foreign countries. It employed nearly 4,000 people, with about 1,800 faculty and 2,000 staff. The university has alumni from 50 U.S. states, Canada, and 25 other countries.

GVSU's NCAA Division II sports teams are the Lakers and they compete in the Great Lakes Intercollegiate Athletic Conference (GLIAC) in all 20 intercollegiate varsity sports. They have won 31 NCAA Division II National Championships.

== History ==
University presidents
President	Years
James Zumberge	1962–1969
Arend Lubbers	1969–2001
Mark Murray	2001–2006
Thomas J. Haas	2006–2019
Philomena V. Mantella	2019–present

=== Formation, planning and construction ===
In 1958 the Michigan Legislature commissioned a study that demonstrated a need for a four-year college in the Grand Rapids area, Michigan's second largest metropolitan region. Local businessman Bill Seidman created a committee to study the report and spearhead the planning and promotion to create such an institution. In the following year the Michigan Legislature established the college. A naming contest was held, and out of 2500 submissions, "Grand Valley State College" was chosen. Private donations, including $350,000 to purchase land and $1,000,000 for construction, were secured from 5,000 individuals, organizations, and business throughout West Michigan. In 1961, the Grand Valley State College Board of Control chose a 876-acre (3.55 km^{2}) site in Ottawa County near the Grand River for the new campus, and construction of academic buildings began the following year.

University enrollment
Year	Enrollment
1963	225
1965	1,144
1970	3,301
1975	7,340
1980	6,984
1985	7,667
1990	11,726
1995	13,887
2000	18,579
2005	22,565
2010	24,541
2015	25,325
2019	24,033
2021	22,406
2022	21,648
2023	22,269
2024	22,011
2025	22,035

=== Early years ===
Grand Valley State College accepted its first class of 226 students in 1963, Diane (Hatch) Paton was the first student, and was among the first graduation of 138 students on June 18, 1967. The middle-late 1960s saw the addition of the first dormitories and construction of new academic buildings, including the Zumberge Library, named for the university's first president, James Zumberge.

In 1969, the Grand Valley Lanthorn printed an issue containing several vulgarities and obscenities. After complaints from some at Grand Valley State College and the surrounding communities, the Ottawa County, Michigan, sheriff arrested the editor, and the prosecutor closed down the newspaper office. The university, then a co-ed college, sued the sheriff and prosecutor for closing the Lanthorn offices. Eventually, Michigan's Attorney General settled the case out of court, siding with the college because the Lanthorn's content was considered covered by Freedom of Speech.

During the 1970s Grand Valley organized its academic units into several colleges: College of Arts and Sciences, Thomas Jefferson College, William James College, Seidman College of Business, and College IV. Michigan Governor William Milliken signed the law changing the institution's name to Grand Valley State Colleges in 1973. However, the "s" was dropped and the name was reverted to Grand Valley State College in 1983 when the academic programs were reorganized into divisions.

=== College to comprehensive university ===
In 1987 the Michigan Legislature passed a law renaming the college to Grand Valley State University. The 1980s and 1990s saw addition of satellite campuses or centers in downtown Grand Rapids, Muskegon, Holland, and Traverse City. In 2004, the university's board reorganized the university structure again into a college system consisting of the College of Liberal Arts and Sciences, College of Interdisciplinary Studies, College of Community and Public Service, College of Education, College of Health Professions, Kirkhof College of Nursing, Seidman College of Business, and Seymour and Esther Padnos College of Engineering and Computing. In 2024, the Seymour and Esther Padnos College of Engineering and Computing was further divided into the Seymour and Esther Padnos College of Engineering and newly formed College of Computing. Grand Valley completed its first 50 years with a comprehensive campaign that raised almost $100 million from over 17,000 donors, making it the university's largest campaign to date. Money raised during the campaign has helped fund many construction projects on campus, including the Mary Idema Pew Library and the L. William Seidman Center.

=== Continued growth beyond 50th anniversary ===
In 2012, GVSU announced several more construction projects and land purchases. Future buildings to be constructed include a new biology laboratory building and an addition and renovation to the Zumberge Library on the Valley campus. Land purchases in 2012 included property in downtown Grand Rapids adjacent to the medical mile for healthcare program expansion, which would become the Daniel and Pamella Devos Center for Interprofessional Health. In 2013, GVSU announced it would add on to Au Sable Hall and construct a building to house the GVSU Laker Store (known as University Bookstore prior to April 2015), with expanded dining facilities.

In 2026, the GVSU Board of Trustees and the State of Michigan approved plans for a $166 million technology hub in downtown Grand Rapids to be known as the Blue Dot Lab. The plans include a $101.4 million renovation of the L.V. Eberhard Center in downtown Grand Rapids as well as a $64.6 million addition to the existing building. Funding for the new project includes $30 million from the State of Michigan as well as up to $139 million in bonds.

== Campuses ==
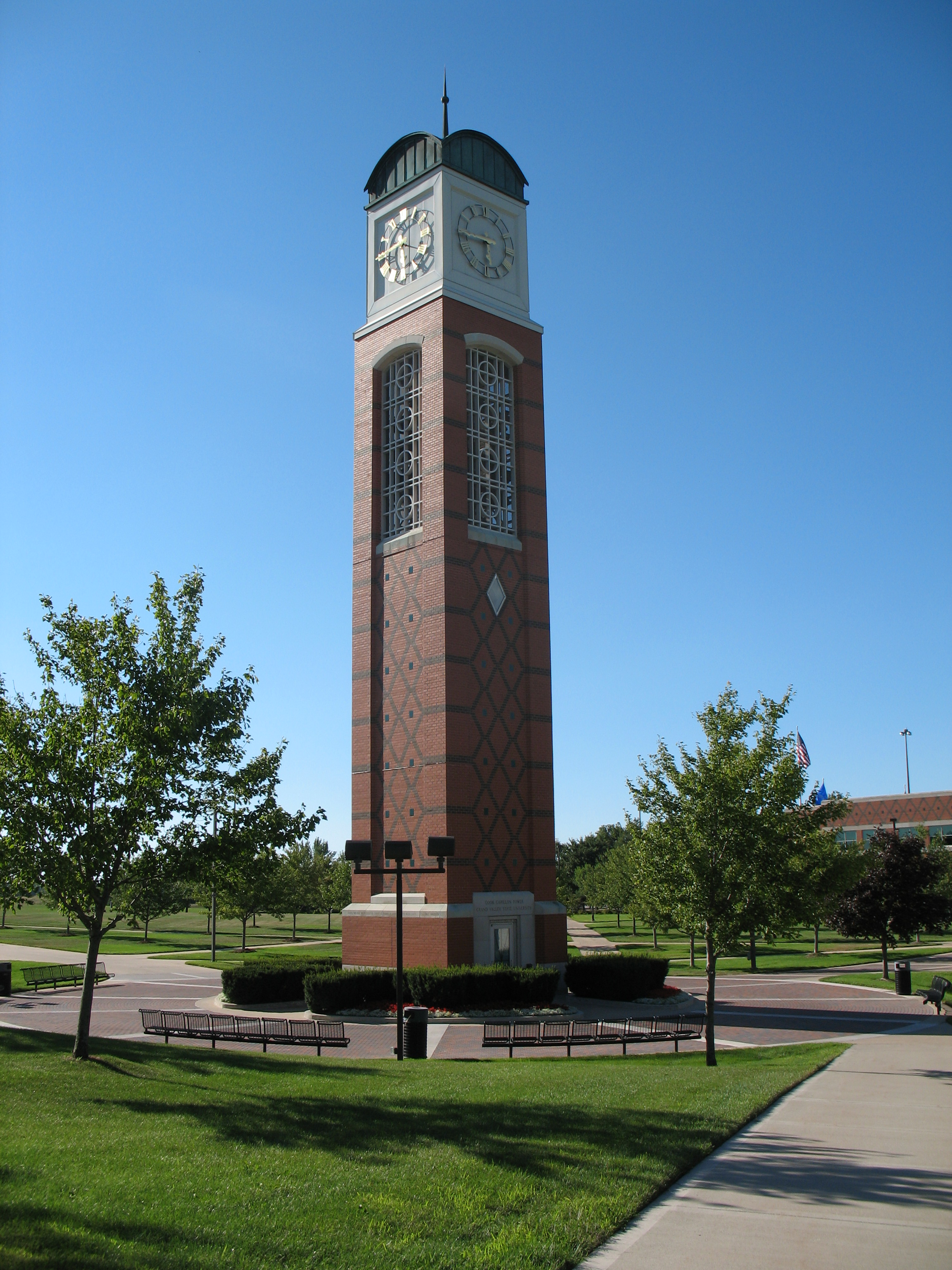
Cook Carillon Tower at Grand Valley State University's Valley campus

Grand Valley has three primary campuses. The main campus is located in Allendale Charter Township, Michigan, about 15 miles (24 km) west of Grand Rapids, Michigan; two satellite campuses are located in Grand Rapids. The university has regional academic centers in Detroit, Holland, Muskegon, and Traverse City.

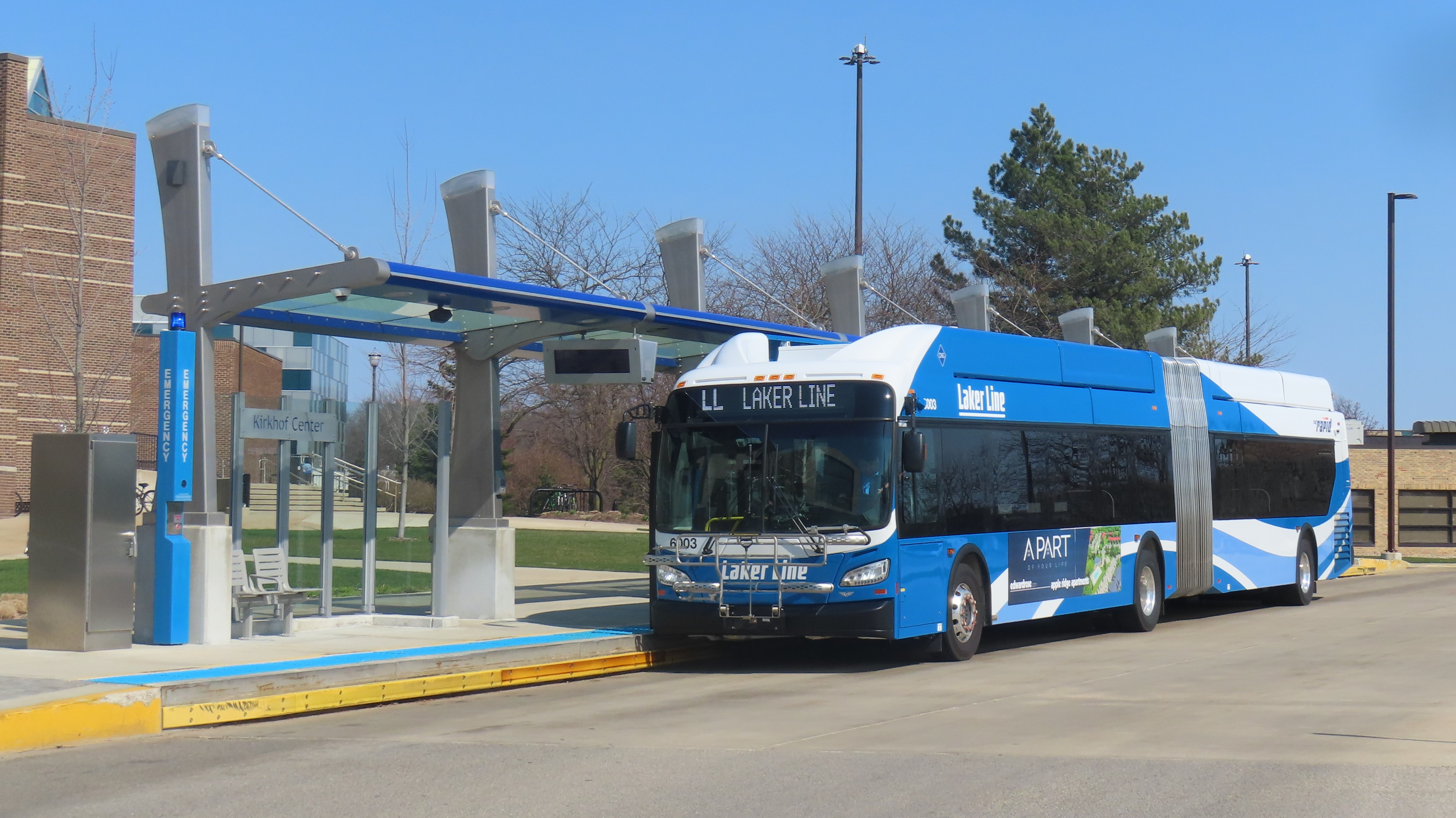
Laker Line bus at Kirkhof Center on the Valley campus

The Rapid operates bus service between the three primary campuses, funded by the university. The Laker Line, named for GVSU's sports teams, connects all three campuses via Lake Michigan Drive, and additional shuttle services operate on the Valley campus. These bus services are open to the public, and rides on all The Rapid services are free for Grand Valley students, faculty and staff on all Rapid routes with a valid I.D. card.

=== Valley campus ===
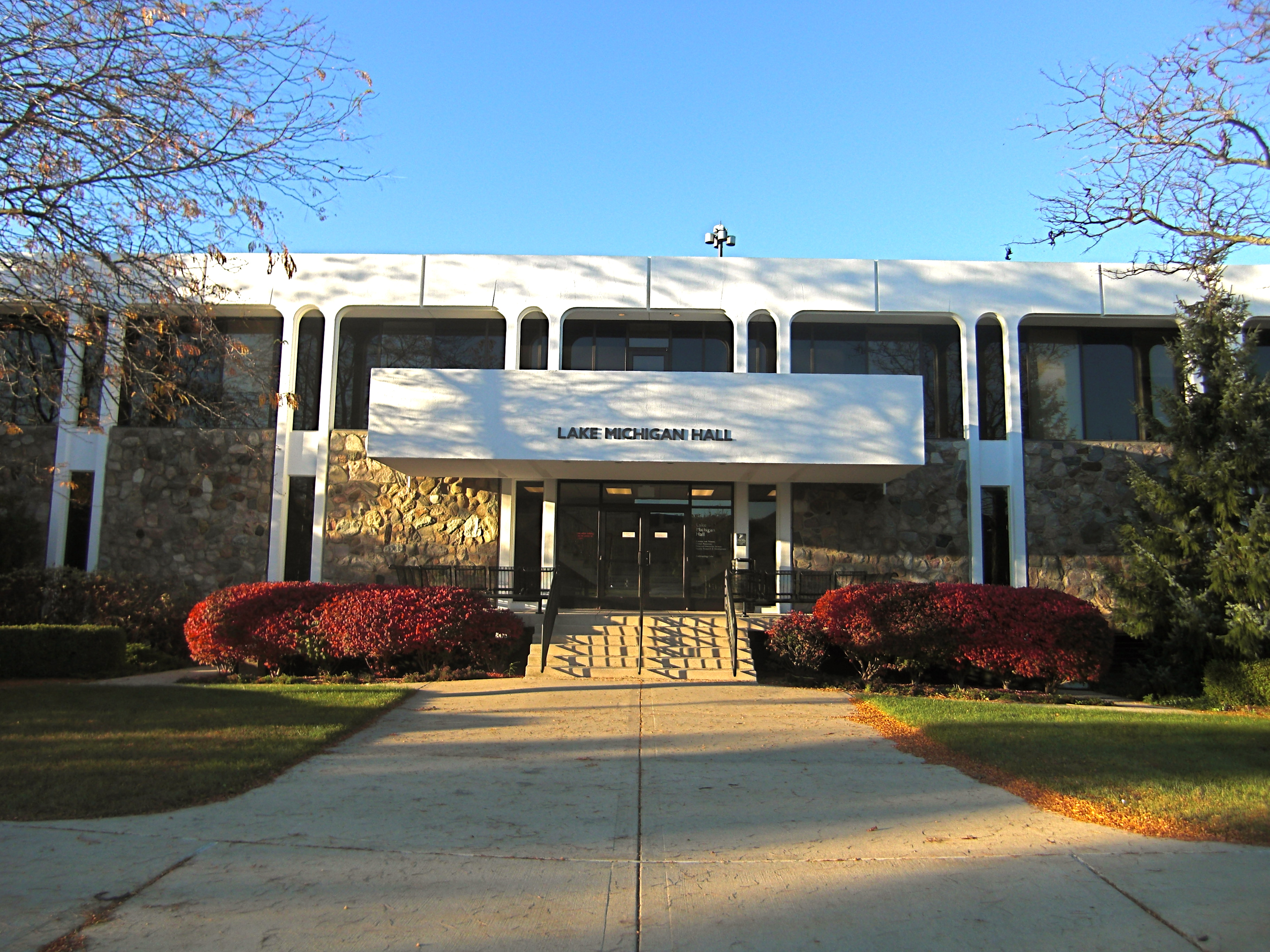
Lake Michigan Hall was one of GVSU's first buildings.

The university's main and original campus in Allendale is the site of most of the university's programs. The Valley campus (formerly known as the Allendale campus) is composed of 1,322 acres perched above the Grand River next to a system of ravines and is divided into two areas, north and south campus, separated by West Campus Drive. State highway M-45 links the campus in suburban Allendale to US Highway 31/Lake Michigan to the west and Grand Rapids, Michigan to the east. Lubbers Stadium, the GVSU Fieldhouse and all other athletic facilities for the school's 20 varsity sports are also on the Valley campus. The campus is dotted with many sculptures, including works by Dale Eldred and James Clover. Academic facilities on the Valley campus includes at least 122 classrooms, 144 research laboratories, 20 lab prep rooms, 21 computer labs, and the Mary Idema Pew Library Learning and Information Commons. The Valley campus is also home to the Kindschi Hall of Science, a science facility that opened in the fall of 2015.

The Holton-Hooker Learning and Living Center, with space for 490 students, opened in August 2016. The building is LEED silver-certified.

In 2025, Grand Valley State University underwent a branding overhaul in which the Allendale campus was renamed to Valley campus.

=== City campus ===
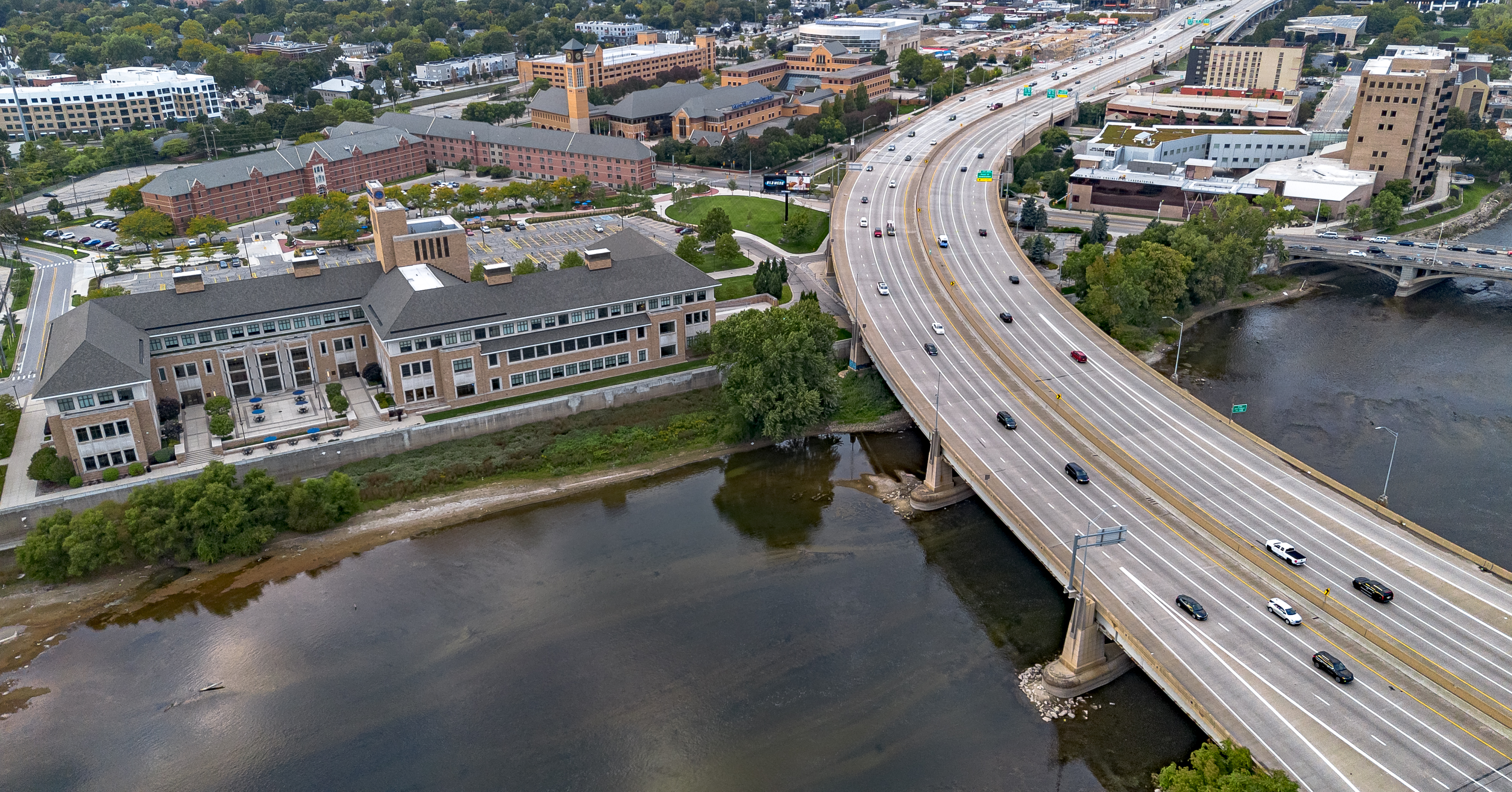
City campus

The 65-acre (260,000 m^{2}) City campus (formerly known as the Robert C. Pew Grand Rapids campus) is in the heart of downtown Grand Rapids on the banks of the Grand River. It consists of 11 buildings and three leased spaces and includes the Richard DeVos Center, L.V. Eberhard Center, L. William Seidman Center, Beckering Family Carillon Tower, The Depot (houses the Michigan Small Business and Technology Development headquarters), Hauenstein Center for Presidential Studies, Keller Engineering Laboratories, John C. Kennedy Hall of Engineering, Peter F. Secchia Hall (housing), Winter Hall (housing), and the Van Andel Global Trade Center. Winter Hall is typically occupied by graduate students and is fully furnished along with appliances. These facilities include 57 classrooms, 78 research laboratories, 23 lab prep rooms, 11 computer labs, and the Steelcase Library. The Steelcase Library was renovated in the Summer of 2025 to include a University Testing Center and Psychology Lab.

In 2025, Grand Valley State University underwent a branding overhaul in which the Robert C. Pew Grand Rapids campus was renamed to City campus.

=== Health campus ===
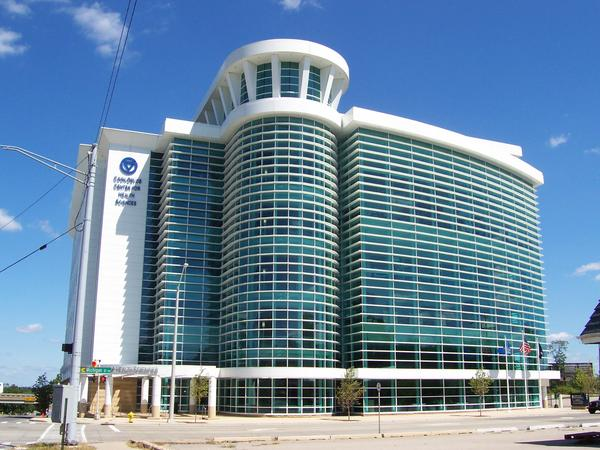
The Cook-DeVos Center for Health Science is part of the Health Campus in downtown Grand Rapids

The 14.5-acre (59,000 m^{2}) Health Campus is a part of the Grand Rapids Medical Mile area and houses many of GVSU's health programs. The Cook-DeVos Center for Health Sciences (CHS), which opened in 2003, reached capacity in 2011. To accommodate the growth in the health sciences, GVSU completed the $37.5 million Raleigh J. Finkelstein Hall north of the Cook-DeVos Center for Health Sciences, and in 2018 broke ground on the next phase, the Daniel and Pamella DeVos Center for Interprofessional Health, a $70 million building that is attached to the Cook-DeVos Center for Health Sciences and includes a parking structure shared with nearby Spectrum Health.

=== Regional centers ===
GVSU has three locations in Muskegon, Michigan. The James L. Stevenson Center for Higher Education at Muskegon Community College was established in the fall of 1995 as a joint venture between GVSU, Ferris State University, and Western Michigan University. The center offers several GVSU graduate and undergraduate programs. Lake Michigan Center houses the Annis Water Resources Institute (AWRI). The Michigan Alternative and Renewable Energy Center (MAREC), which is the first fully integrated demonstration facility for distributed generation of electricity using alternative and renewable energy technologies in the United States.

The Traverse City Regional Center was established in the fall of 1995 in Traverse City, Michigan, and is at the NMC University Center in partnership with Northwestern Michigan College. The center offers undergraduate and graduate degrees in education, social work, and liberal studies. The GVSU Physician Assistant program enrolls 10-14 students at the TC campus.

The Meijer campus, just outside downtown Holland, Michigan, was opened in 1998 and was named for the Meijer family for their donation of land. The campus houses continuing education programs in 30,693 square feet (2,851.5 m^{2}) of building space and contains 12 classrooms, 2 conference rooms, 3 labs and 11 offices.

The Detroit Center was established in 2012 when GVSU purchased the Barden Building adjacent to Comerica Park in downtown Detroit to house its charter school offices. The center also houses the Southeast Michigan Region of the Michigan Small Business & Technology Development Center, of which GVSU is the supervisor.

== Organization and administration ==
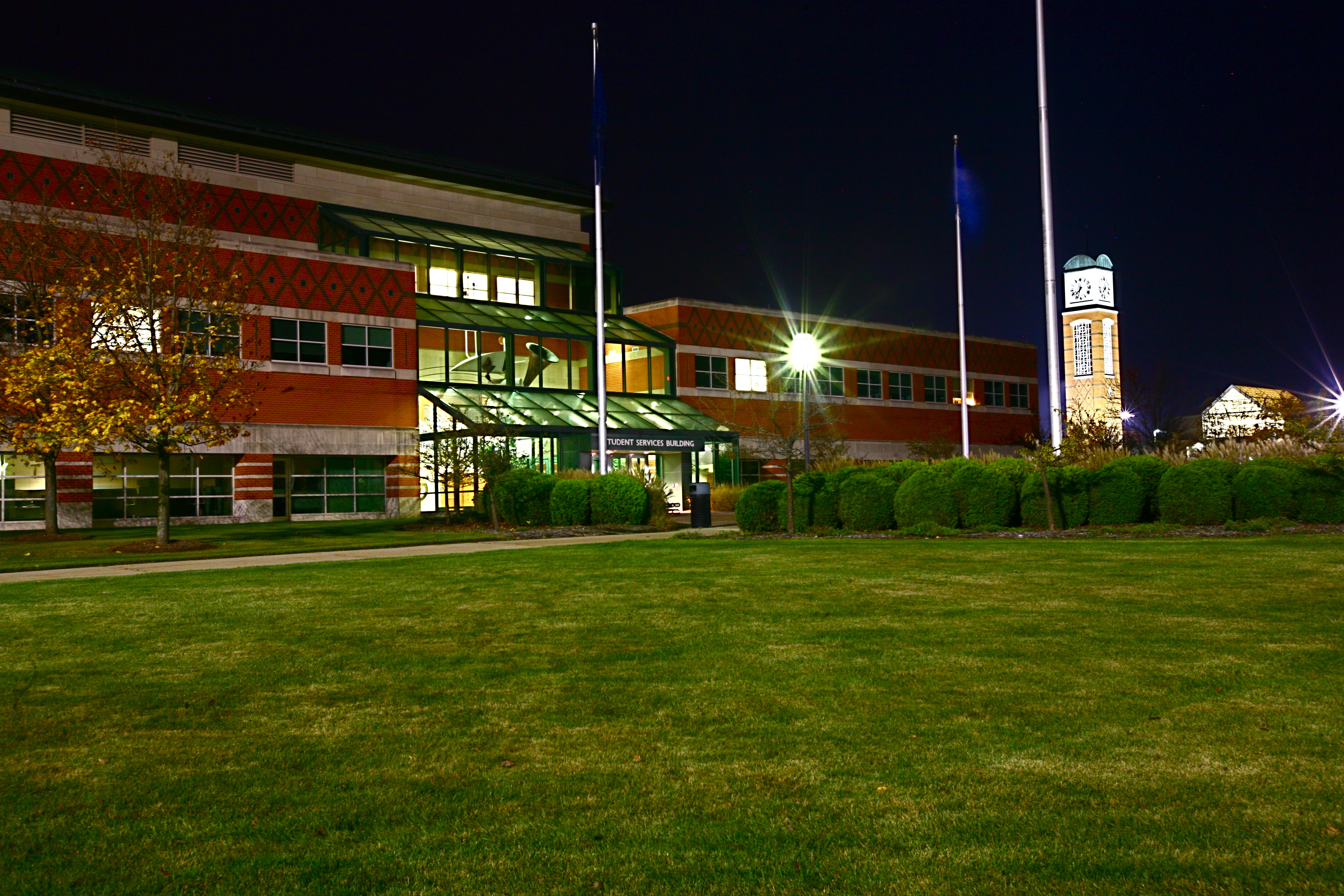
Student Services Building at Grand Valley State University Valley campus

Grand Valley State University is governed by an eight-member board of trustees, whose members are appointed by the Governor of Michigan and confirmed by the Michigan Senate for terms of eight years. This setup is provided for by the constitution of the state of Michigan of 1963. Members of the board serve without compensation. The board appoints the president of the university, formulates university policies, controls university finances, and acts as the supreme governing body of the institution. The president of the university administers the policies of the board of trustees.

=== Finance ===
GVSU's general fund budget is $351 million, of which $275 million is from tuition and $72 million is from state appropriations. As of 2019, Grand Valley's amount of university-based student financial aid was $289 million, including $90 million of that in scholarships and grants. During the 2013–2014 academic year, full-time dependent students received an average award of $13,276.

=== Public safety ===
The Grand Valley Police Department provides law enforcement services for the Valley Campus. While the department is self-empowered to enforce its jurisdiction, officers are also deputized by the Ottawa County Sheriff's Department. Because Allendale doesn't have a police department, the Grand Valley State University Police can handle cases anywhere in Ottawa County, mainly in Allendale and the area surrounding the campus. The department handles other security issues, such as parking and driving violations, community policing, as well lost and found. Allendale Fire Department serves the campus. The Department of Public Safety also employs several students who assist the department by performing a variety of clerical and security based duties and services. The City Campus Security and Regional Centers is an entity distinct from the Department of Public safety, and handles security and public safety issues for the City Campus and all Regional Centers including the Holland (MI) Meijer Campus, the Muskegon (MI) campus and the Traverse City (MI) campus. This department is not sworn or certified and relies on the Grand Rapids Police Department and other local law enforcement agencies for official law enforcement when necessary.

== Academics ==
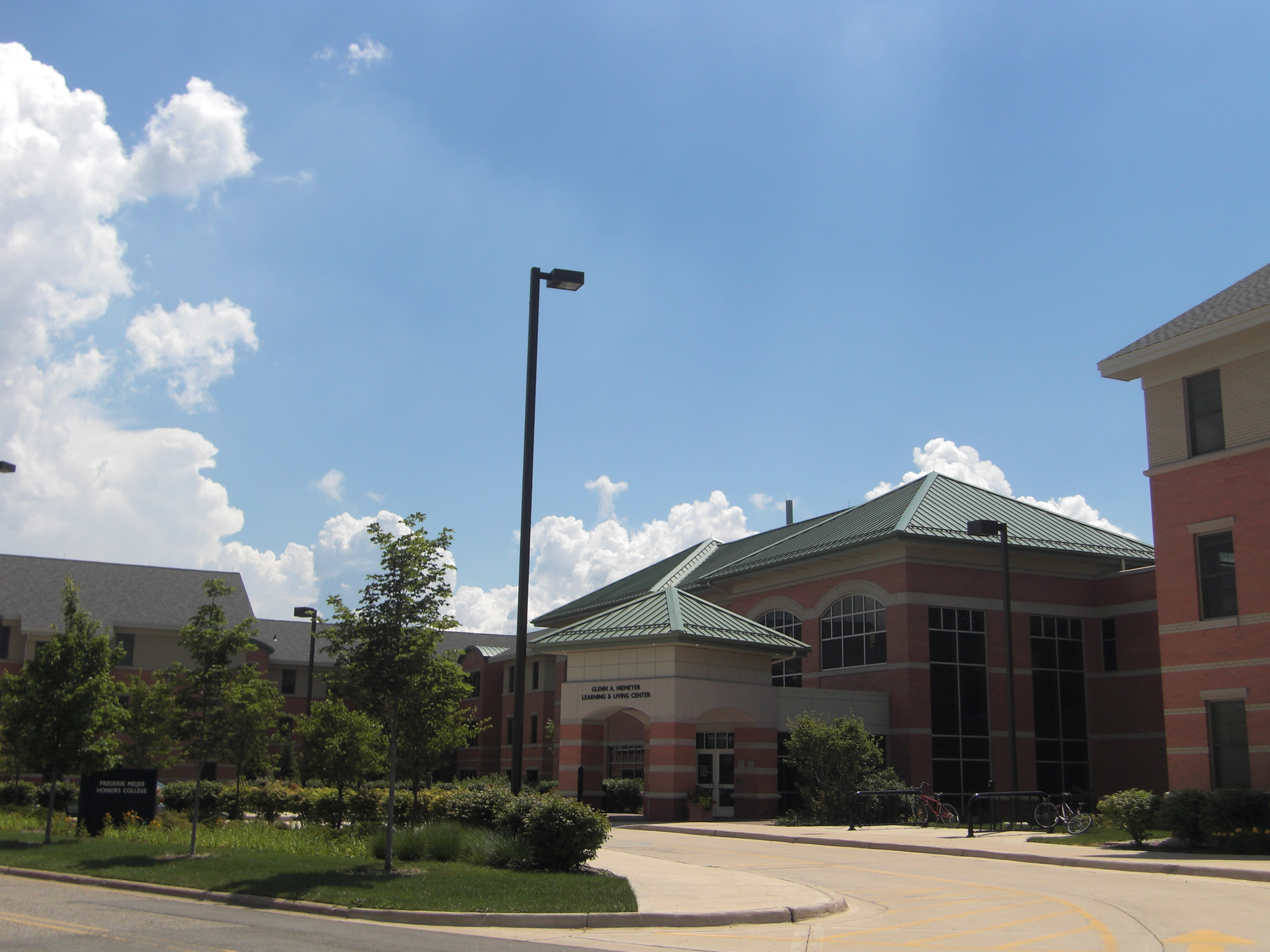
Glenn A. Niemeyer Learning and Living Center is home to the Frederik Meijer Honors College, and is located on the GVSU Valley campus.

Grand Valley State University is a large, primarily residential comprehensive university that has a large undergraduate enrollment and emphasis. GVSU offers over 200 areas of study, including 82 undergraduate majors and 36 graduate programs that include 74 graduate emphases and certificate programs at the certificate, bachelor's, post-bachelor's, master's, post-master's, and doctoral levels. GVSU conferred 3,954 undergraduate degrees and 1,161 graduate degrees in 2025–2026. Its most popular undergraduate majors, by 2021 graduates, were:

Biomedical Sciences (262)
Health Professions and Related Clinical Sciences (250)
Exercise Science and Kinesiology (250)
Marketing/Marketing Management (226)
Psychology (226)
Registered Nursing/Registered Nurse (208)
Finance (205)

Grand Valley's student body consists of 18,728 undergraduates and 2,654 graduate students across all campuses and centers as of Fall 2026, with the majority being on the Valley campus. The fall 2014 incoming freshman undergraduate class of 4,199 students, represented 80 Michigan counties, 23 states, and 20 countries. 86% of first year students live on campus: 3,591 freshman chose to live on-campus in fall 2014, while 608 chose to live off-campus. As of fall 2014, more than 400 international students were enrolled at the university representing 82 countries.

Grand Valley is accredited by the Higher Learning Commission. Grand Valley also has baccalaureate program accreditation with AACSB, ABET, APTA, CSWE, NASAD, NASM, NCATE, and NLN.

=== Colleges ===
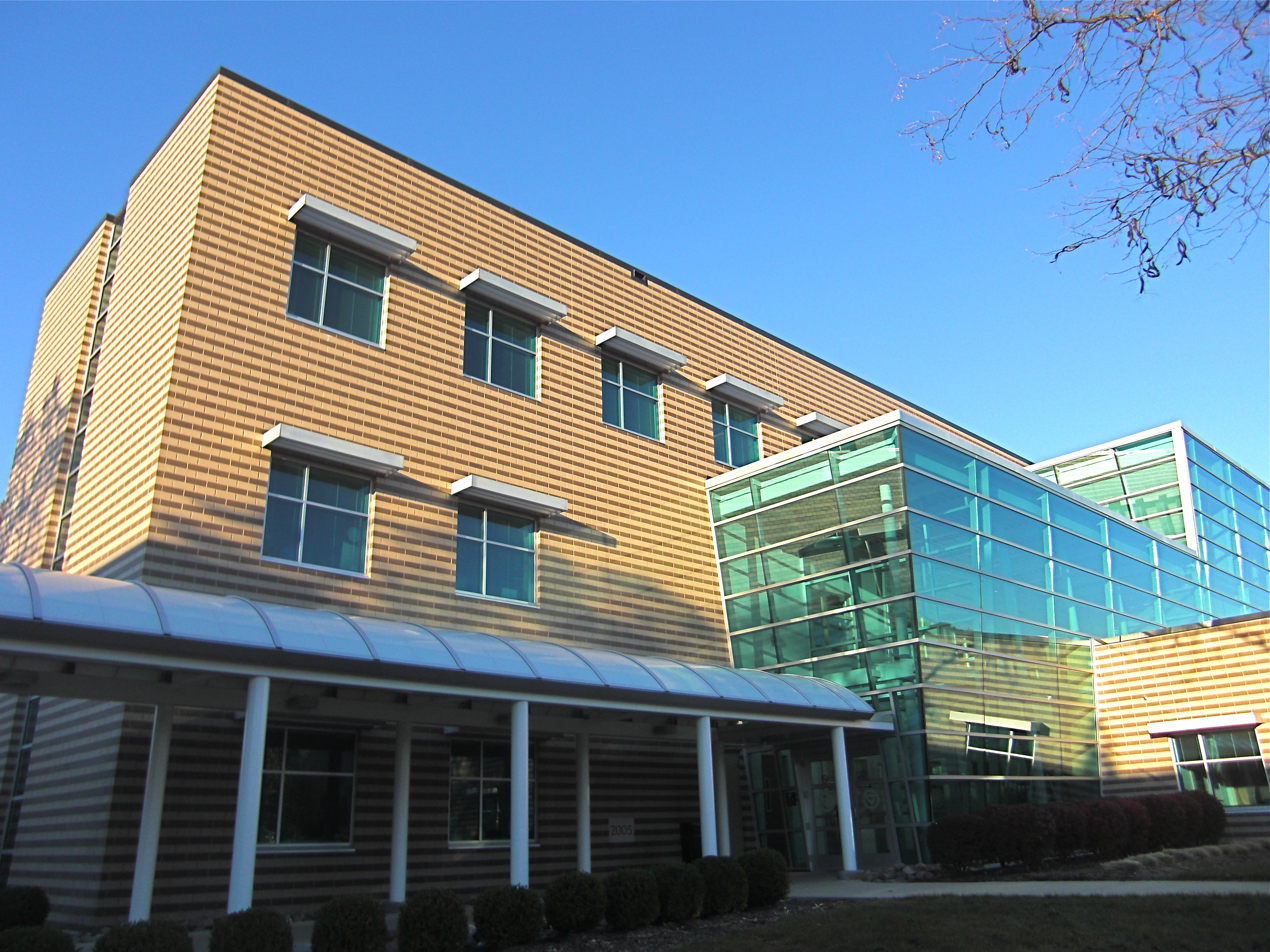
Lake Ontario Hall is home to the Brooks College of Interdisciplinary Studies, and is part of the Great Lakes Complex.

The university consists of eight degree-granting colleges:

- F.E. Seidman College of Business
- College of Education and Community Innovation
- College of Liberal Arts and Sciences
- Seymour and Esther Padnos College of Engineering
- College of Computing
- College of Health Professions
- Kirkhof College of Nursing
- Brooks College of Interdisciplinary Studies

GVSU is also home to the Frederik Meijer Honors College, which is non-degree-granting but is meant to provide a more challenging interdisciplinary education in a learning-living environment. The honors college is in the Glenn A. Niemeyer Learning and Living Center on the south side of the Valley campus.

GVSU has a National Association of Schools of Art and Design (NASAD) accredited art program, including emphases in illustration, graphic design, ceramics, printmaking, painting, visual studies, and sculpture. Art students attend classes at the Calder Art Center, named for contemporary artist Alexander Calder. The building includes exhibition space under the name of the Stuart & Barbara Padnos Art Gallery.

=== Study abroad ===
The Padnos International Center collaborates with students who wish to study abroad. Grand Valley has more than 4,000 study abroad programs, both affiliated with and independent from GVSU, from which students can choose.

In 1995 Peimin Ni (Chinese: 倪培民; pinyin: Ní Péimín) established GVSU's Shanghai, China study abroad program, and by the 2000s he and Geling Shang (商戈令; Shāng Gēlìng) co-lead it. Word of mouth and announcements in classes were used to promote it. Daniel Golden, author of Spy Schools: How the CIA, FBI, and Foreign Intelligence Secretly Exploit America's Universities, stated that the organizers initially had trouble finding interested students.

=== Undergraduate admissions ===
Undergraduate admissions statistics
- 2021 entering class
- Admit rate: 91.7 (▲ +10)
- Yield rate: 24.2 (▼ −6.6)

Test scores middle 50%
- SAT Total: 1010-1230 (among 62% of FTFs)
- ACT Composite: 21-27 (among 10% of FTFs)

GVSU's undergraduate admissions are classified as "more selective" by U.S. News & World Report as Grand Valley admitted 69% of applicants for the 2008–2009 school year. For the Class of 2025 (enrolling Fall 2021), GVSU received 17,163 applications and accepted 15,730 (91.7%), with 3,807 enrolling. The middle 50% range of SAT scores for enrolling freshmen was 1010-1230. The middle 50% ACT composite score range was 21-27.

Fall First-Time Freshman Statistics
	2021	2020	2019	2018	2017	2016
Applicants	17,163	15,415	16,478	17,133	17,509	17,104
Admits	15,730	13,535	13,691	14,178	14,168	13,972
Admit rate	91.7	87.8	83.1	82.8	80.9	81.7
Enrolled	3,807	3,450	3,863	4,312	4,117	4,306
Yield rate	24.2	25.5	28.2	30.4	29.1	30.8
ACT Composite* (out of 36)	21-27 (10%†)	21-27 (30%†)	21-26 (34%†)	21-27 (37%†)	21-26 (53%†)	21-26 (99%†)
SAT Composite* (out of 1600)	1010-1230 (62%†)	1050-1230 (90%†)	1050-1240 (88%†)	1050-1240 (88%†)	1060-1230 (76%†)	—
* middle 50% range † percentage of first-time freshmen who chose to submit

=== Rankings ===
Academic rankings

National
- Forbes: 481
- U.S. News & World Report: 228
- Washington Monthly: 187

U.S. News & World Report ranked Grand Valley third in the "Top Public Regional Universities in the Midwest" category and 26th in the "Regional Universities (Midwest) tier 1" category for 2014.

US News & World Report noted in its "Best Colleges 2011" that 98 percent of Grand Valley graduates find employment or pursue advanced degrees after graduation.

In 2024, Washington Monthly ranked Grand Valley 187th among 438 national universities in the U.S. based on Grand Valley's contribution to the public good, as measured by social mobility, research, and promoting public service.

=== Research ===
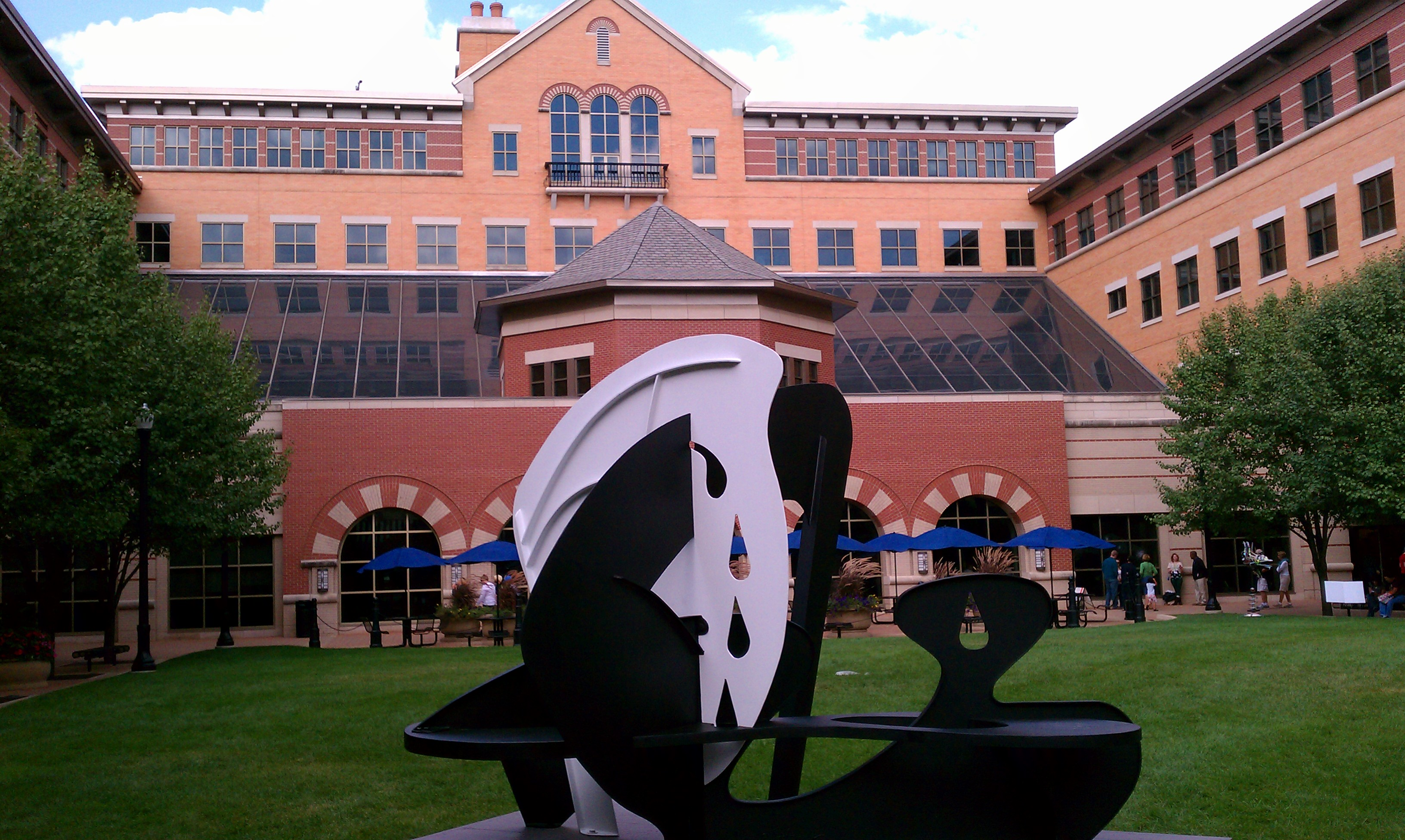
Richard M. DeVos Center on GVSU-City campus

During the two years prior to October 2009 university researchers engaged in over 186 research projects funded by more than $32.7 million in grants. Grand Valley's Annis Water Resources Institute conducts research on water resources, including: ecosystem structure and function, contaminants and toxicology, hydrology, land use, watershed, stream, and wetland ecology, water quality, and basic and applied limnology. GVSU's Michigan Alternative and Renewable Energy Center (MAREC) recently received funding for its $3.7 million Lake Michigan Offshore Wind Assessment Project to test wind energy on Lake Michigan. The research should take three years as a floating buoy will be used and moved to collect data from different locations on the lake.

=== Michigan State University partnerships ===
The Michigan State University College of Human Medicine maintains the Secchia Center, a medical campus in downtown Grand Rapids. Along with GVSU and two Grand Rapids hospitals, it is a founding member of the Grand Rapids Medical Education Partners. This partnership allows "educational opportunities for residents, fellows, practicing physicians, physician assistants, nurses and students in other health professions."

The Early Assurance Program reserves spaces in MSU's medical program for top-performing GVSU pre-medical graduates. One of the program's goals is to select first-generation college students, students from underprivileged areas, and students who have expressed a desire to work in high-demand medical specialties. Students entering the program must agree to work in under-served areas after they complete their medical degrees. The first group of six students entered this program during the fall 2010 semester.

The two universities have announced a joint program specializing in clinical trial management, aimed at providing the foundations for carrying out clinical drug trials in West Michigan. It is an online certificate program, and was started due to requests from local drug trial companies. The program was set to begin for the fall semester of 2011.

== Libraries ==
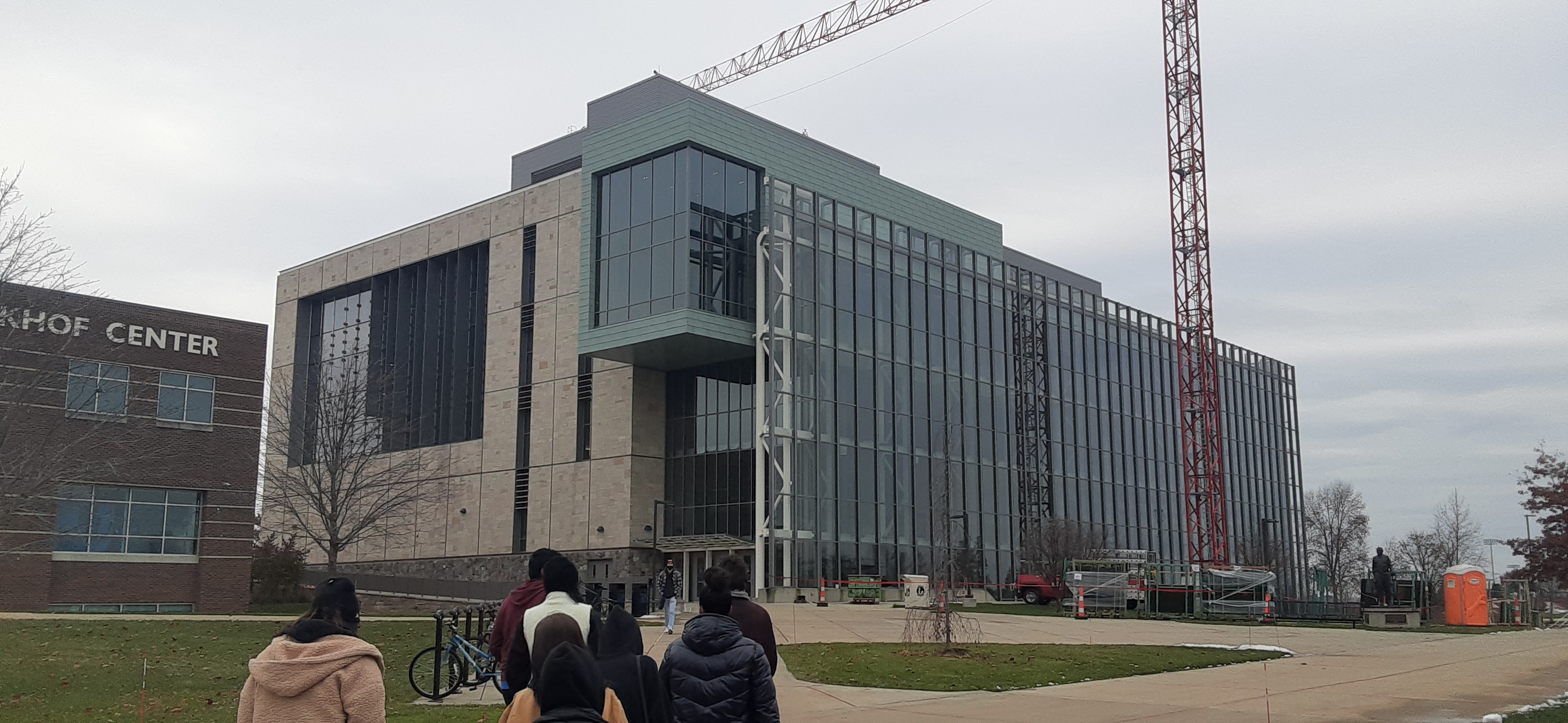
Mary Idema Pew Library at the Valley campus

Each academic library's collection is tailored to its location and the programs it serves, with daily deliveries between sites.

- Mary Idema Pew Library (Allendale)
- Lemmen Library & Archives (Allendale)
- Steelcase Library (Grand Rapids)
- Frey Foundation Learning Center (Grand Rapids)
- Curriculum Materials Library (Grand Rapids)

The university libraries offer opportunities for research, collaboration, and individual study. Collectively, the libraries subscribe to over 60,000 print and electronic journals. They also house more than 1,482,633 books including more than 829,463 electronic books.

Construction the Mary Idema Pew Library on the Valley campus was finished in 2013. The building is named after the late Mary Idema Pew. The $70 million, 140,000-square-foot (13,000 m^{2}) facility holds 150,000 books. It also has an automated storage and retrieval system that can handle 600,000 volumes. The U.S. Department of Energy announced the library used part of the $21 million allocated for technical assistance projects to improve energy use in commercial buildings. The library was one of only 24 projects in the United States receiving the assistantships that was funded by the American Recovery and Reinvestment Act.

=== Collections ===
Grand Valley is a recipient of United States government documents and receives 44% of the documents distributed by the Federal Depository Library Program.

The Curriculum Materials Library, part of the Steelcase Library at the City campus, houses instructional materials for preschool through grade twelve and provides spaces where education majors can preview resources, develop lesson plans, create media for the classroom, and try out teaching aides.

The Lemmen Library & Archives on the Valley campus houses the University Archives, which include extensive collections of rare books and Michigan novels, the Harvey Lemmen Collection on Abraham Lincoln, the Young Lords project on line at Young Lords in Lincoln Park Young Lords in Lincoln Park - Lemmen Library & Archives - Grand Valley State University, the largest Latino oral history collection in the Mid-West by Jose Cha Cha Jimenez, and the American Civil War, and the papers of acclaimed Michigan author Jim Harrison. There is also an Anthony Powell collection, consisting of the many editions of Dance to the Music of Time, his other novels, a complete run of the Anthony Powell Society Newsletters and its journal, Secret Harmonies.

A collection of over 15,000 works of art features public sculpture, prints and drawings, American Impressionism, Aboriginal art, Indian art, world photography, contemporary art, and more. Most of the collection is on view and can be found throughout university buildings on campuses in Allendale, Grand Rapids, Holland, Muskegon, Traverse City, and Detroit.

The Digital Collections database contains a selection of photographs, correspondence, diaries, interviews, and publications from the holdings of the Libraries' Special Collections & University Archives, and other University entities.

The Dorothy A. Johnson Collection is a collection on philanthropy, volunteerism, and nonprofit leadership. It is considered to be one of the most comprehensive in the United States and is the only one of its kind in Michigan.

== Student life ==
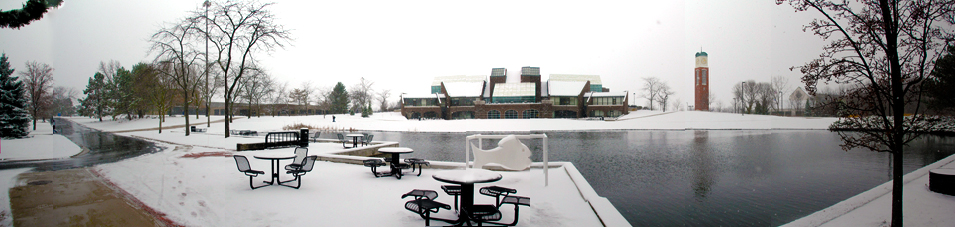
A panoramic view of the Kirkhof lawn at GVSU-Valley campus

The Office of Student Life at GVSU is in the Kirkhof Center near the center of the Valley campus. Its offices are home to the Community Service Learning Center, Fraternity and Sorority Life, Laker Leadership Programs, Major Campus Events and Traditions, Student Organizations, and the Transitions Orientation Program. As of fall 2016, GVSU has over 486 student-run organizations. Student organizations include categories in, but are not limited to, Academic and Professional, Student Life Sports, Cultural, Honorary, Interfaith and Religious, Media, Performing Arts, Service and Advocacy, and Special Interests.

=== Housing and residential life ===
The Connection Commons at GVSU-Valley Campus

Grand Valley State University is home to 29 living centers (residence halls) and three on-campus apartment complexes on its main Valley campus, and two residence halls on its City campus, totaling 6,068 beds. GVSU also has six individual dining halls on campus for students and faculty. These dining halls are housed in five facilities with five halls being on the Valley campus and one on the City campus.

=== Greek life ===
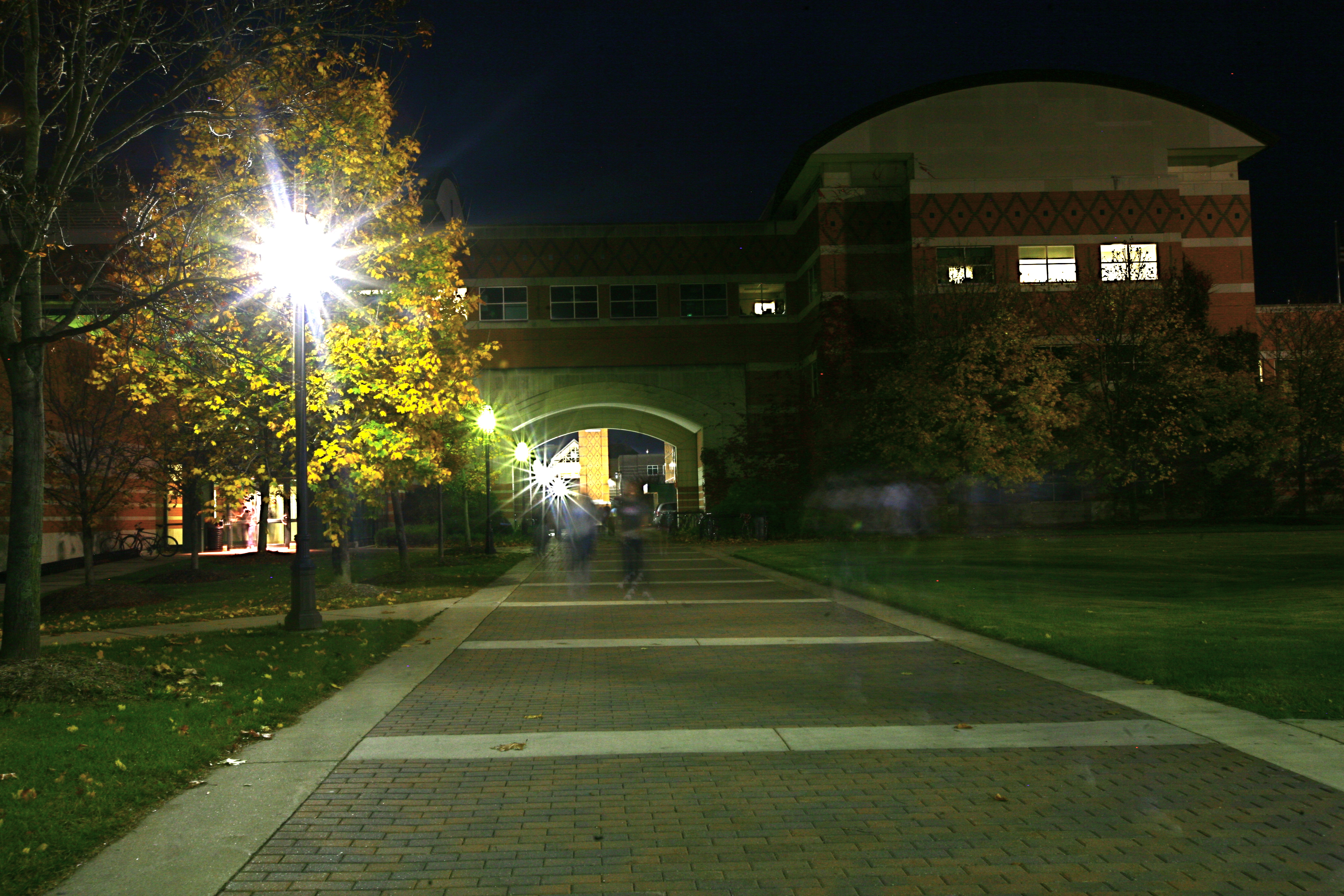
Henry Hall Arch at GVSU-Valley campus

GVSU has 30 fraternities and sororities. As of the winter of 2016, the GVSU fraternity and sorority community consisted of 1,600 undergraduate members, representing approximately 7.8% of the undergraduate population.

=== Media ===
GVSU has a variety of media outlets offered to its campuses.

The Grand Valley Lanthorn is the student-run newspaper, published on Mondays and Thursdays during the academic year. Copies of the paper are free and available at both the Allendale and Grand Rapids campuses in designated newsstands and online. Until the fall of 2006, the paper was only published once per week. 8,000 copies of the paper are published per issue totaling 16,000 copies per week.

GVSU has several electronic media outlets including three radio stations and three television stations. The university owns and operates its own Public Broadcasting Service (PBS) Public television station WGVU-TV in Allendale, Michigan and WGVK-TV, its full-time satellite station in Kalamazoo, Michigan. In addition, GVSU also operates a National Public Radio (NPR) station in WGVU-FM with the same call letters, which feature a mixture of jazz, blues, and news, including local and NPR programming. WCKS ("The Whale") is the student-run radio station, broadcasting over the internet and Tunein. Grand Valley TV (GVTV) is the student-run television station on channel 46.1 on the university cable system, while uploading its content to YouTube.

=== Music ===
The music program at Grand Valley State University offers various performing ensembles, including 3 performing bands, an orchestra, several small performance ensembles, and the 230-piece Laker Marching Band and adjunct athletic bands. The Performing Arts Center (PAC) houses numerous rehearsal spaces, classrooms, labs, offices, practice halls, two dance studios, a theatre workshop, and the Louis Armstrong Theatre, along with the new Sherman Van Solkema recital hall.

The New Music Ensemble (NME) has released two critically acclaimed CDs, the first a recording of Steve Reich's Music for 18 Musicians, which appeared on the Billboard Classical Crossover chart, and the second entitled In C Remixed, a remix project of Terry Riley's In C, which featured the work of some of the top electronic composers and DJs in the world, including Todd Reynolds, Michael Lowenstern, and Pulitzer prize winner David Lang. The NME performed at Le Poisson Rouge in New York City on November 2, 2009 and previously at the 2007 Bang on a Can festival.

Grand Valley's trumpet ensemble has been a top competitor in the National Trumpet Competition for nearly a decade, placing first in the ensemble division in 2006 and 2008. The ensemble has commissioned four pieces by composer Erik Morales since 2005, two of which went on to become the winning pieces, and one of which is still unpremiered. The trumpet ensemble has performed twice during the International Trumpet Guild's summer conferences in 2007 and 2009.

=== Student government ===
Student government at Grand Valley is formally known as Student Senate. There are 50 student senators that serve on one of seven different committees. Student Senate offices are in the Kirkhof Center on GVSU's Valley campus.

=== Sustainability ===
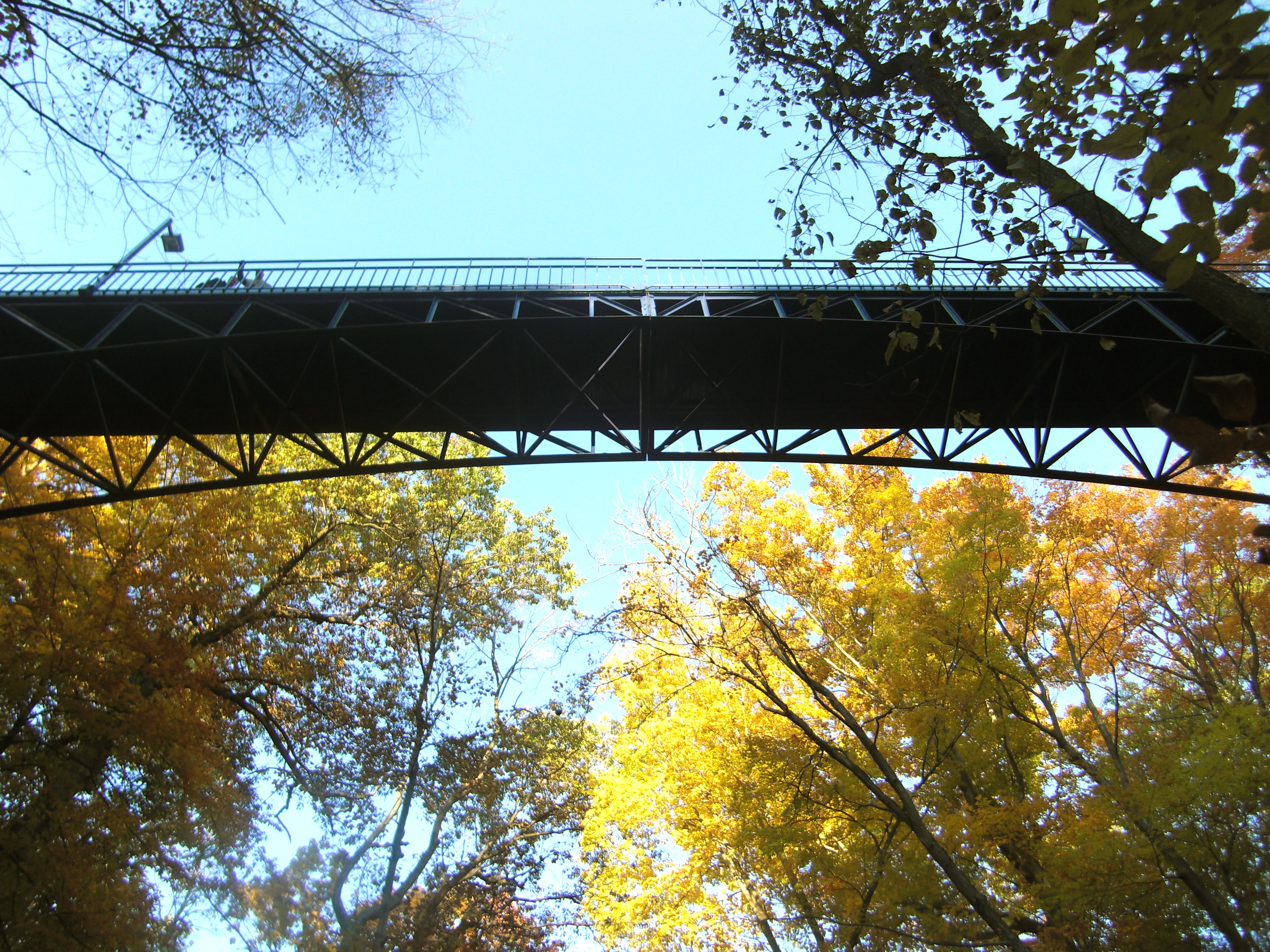
Little Mac Bridge at Grand Valley State University-Valley campus

Sustainability is listed as the seventh of Grand Valley's core values. The institution's Office of Sustainability Practices provides best "practices in administration and campus operations, educational opportunities, student involvement, and community engagement." Notable programs include a community garden near the Valley campus that also serves as a laboratory for interdisciplinary learning called the Sustainable Agriculture Project and the Sustainability Reinvestment Fund distributed in the form of mini-grants to students and staff with ideas that can improve the ecological footprint of the campus and community.

The university has created a formal climate action plan and set a goal to reduce its 2006 level of greenhouse gas emissions 20% by 2020. The university's sustainability efforts were awarded a "A−" by the Sustainable Endowments Institute for 2011. Grand Valley's overall sustainability grade is the highest amongst the nine Michigan universities that were surveyed and the 28th best in the nation. In other rankings GVSU was placed as high as 16th in the world and tenth in the United States for its sustainability efforts and environment-friendly university management by Universitas Indonesia GreenMetric World University Ranking for 2011.

The university is home to eleven Leadership in Energy and Environmental Design (LEED) buildings or building additions. Several more buildings including the new Mary Idema Pew Library are in construction or planning stages to be LEED certified as well. All new construction and major renovations at GVSU must meet LEED standards required by the university. As of 2019 there have been 25 LEED-certified projects completed at Grand Valley. $2.2 million is saved annually on Grand Valley's energy bill through a combination of energy conservation efforts and LEED construction projects.

The Student Environmental Coalition or SEC, is the student-run sustainability organization on campus. The mission of the group is "Helping to engage students at Grand Valley's campus to be conscious citizens by promotion of environmental awareness."

Additionally, several academic programs offer the study of sustainability. Those housed in the College of Liberal Arts and Sciences include Geography and Sustainable Planning (major and minor) and Natural Resource Management (major and minor). Those housed in the Brooks College of Interdisciplinary Studies include the Liberal Studies major and the Environmental Studies minor.

Grand Valley hosted meetings relating to sustainability, including a summit in which various sustainability issues were explored by university officials and local experts in April 2010, and a meeting of the Michigan Great Lakes Wind Council in July 2010 to discuss offshore wind energy generation.

== Athletics ==
The Grand Valley State Lakers are the intercollegiate athletic teams of Grand Valley State University. The GVSU Lakers compete at the NCAA Division II level and offer 20 varsity sports including 11 for women and 9 for men. The university participates in and is a founding member of the Great Lakes Intercollegiate Athletic Conference (GLIAC). Grand Valley's varsity athletic teams have won 28 national championships in several sports. GVSU has also won the prestigious National Association of Collegiate Directors of Athletics (NACDA) Directors' Cup for NCAA Division II schools fourteen times: in 2004 thru 2011, 2014 thru 2017, 2019, and 2022. The Lakers also have five second-place finishes in 2002, 2003, 2012, 2013 and 2018. The cup is awarded to the top athletic programs based on overall team national finishes. Grand Valley is the first college east of the Mississippi River to win the Director's Cup for NCAA Division II.

The official mascot of Grand Valley State is Louie the Laker. "GVSU Victory!", which is sometimes referred to as "Grand Valley Victory", is the fight song for the Grand Valley State University Lakers.

== Notable people ==
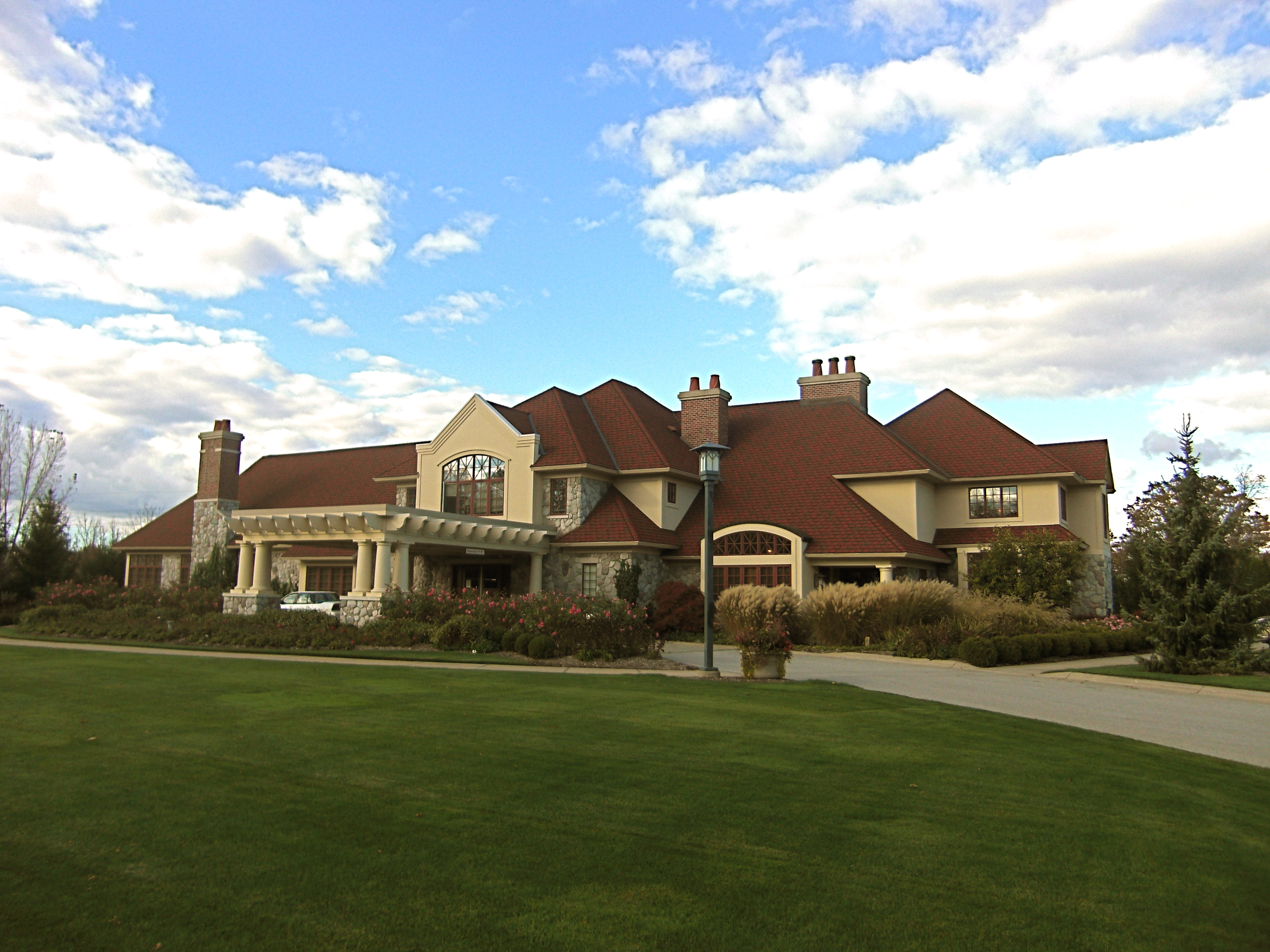
Alumni House on Grand Valley State University-Valley campus

== See also ==
- List of colleges and universities in Michigan
