= Michigan Alternative and Renewable Energy Center =

US research facility

The Michigan Alternative and Renewable Energy Center (MAREC) was a facility located in Muskegon, Michigan that promoted innovation and entrepreneurship with a focus in alternative and renewable energy technologies. In May 2016, the Center was renamed the Muskegon Innovation Hub and the organization refocused on supporting regional innovation and entrepreneurship.

== History and development ==
Development and planning for the center began in 1999 when a group of Grand Valley State University faculty and Muskegon business people proposed a research and development facility focused on alternative energy. Subsequent partnerships between the business, community, and the private sector resulted in groundbreaking for the center in late 2002, and its completion in 2003.

== The building ==
The 25,000-square-foot (2,300 m^{2}) facility was powered, in part, by a fuel cell and a micro turbine, which turned natural gas into electricity. In addition, the building's photovoltaic solar roof tiles harnessed the solar power generated by the sun to create useful energy. MAREC then used a nickel metal hydride battery system to store some of the energy produced by these sources for use during peak energy consumption periods.

The building was also constructed using many alternative and renewable building materials including flooring surfaces produced from fast-growing bamboo and recycled tires, and rigid wall surfaces made from pressed wheat. These materials were used to conserve and recycle valuable natural resources.

== Economic development ==
MAREC was part of the Muskegon Lakeshore SmartZone, a joint venture with the Michigan Economic Development Corporation, the city of Muskegon, and Grand Valley State University. The Muskegon Lakeshore SmartZone is intended to promote and attract high technology business development in Muskegon and the region.

MAREC had 4,000 square feet (400 m^{2}) of space devoted to incubating businesses that would research and develop alternative energy sources and uses. The focus on alternative energy was expected to be a catalyst for economic development and job growth in the area. Research and development initiatives was also intended to fuel business expansion at Edison Landing, the 32-acre (130,000 m^{2}) SmartZone being transformed into a multi-use office, retail, and residential center. Overall SmartZone development was expected to complement the array of human, physical, and capital investments made at MAREC.
