= MAREC =

The MAtrixware REsearch Collection (MAREC) is a standardised patent data corpus available for research purposes. MAREC seeks to represent patent documents of several languages in order to answer specific research questions. It consists of 19 million patent documents in different languages, normalised to a highly specific XML schema.

MAREC is intended as raw material for research in areas such as information retrieval, natural language processing or machine translation, which require large amounts of complex documents. The collection contains documents in 19 languages, the majority being English, German and French, and about half of the documents include full text.

In MAREC, the documents from different countries and sources are normalised to a common XML format with a uniform patent numbering scheme and citation format. The standardised fields include dates, countries, languages, references, person names, and companies as well as subject classifications such as IPC codes.

MAREC is a comparable corpus, where many documents are available in similar versions in other languages. A comparable corpus can be defined as consisting of texts that share similar topics – news text from the same time period in different countries, while a parallel corpus is defined as a collection of documents with aligned translations from the source to the target language. Since the patent document refers to the same “invention” or “concept of idea” the text is a translation of the invention, but it does not have to be a direct translation of the text itself – text parts could have been removed or added for clarification reasons.

The 19,386,697 XML files measure a total of 621 GB and are hosted by the Information Retrieval Facility. Access and support are free of charge for research purposes.

== Use Cases ==
- MAREC is used in the Patent Language Translations Online (PLuTO) project.
