= ING Group =

Dutch multinational banking and financial services corporation

ING Groep N.V.

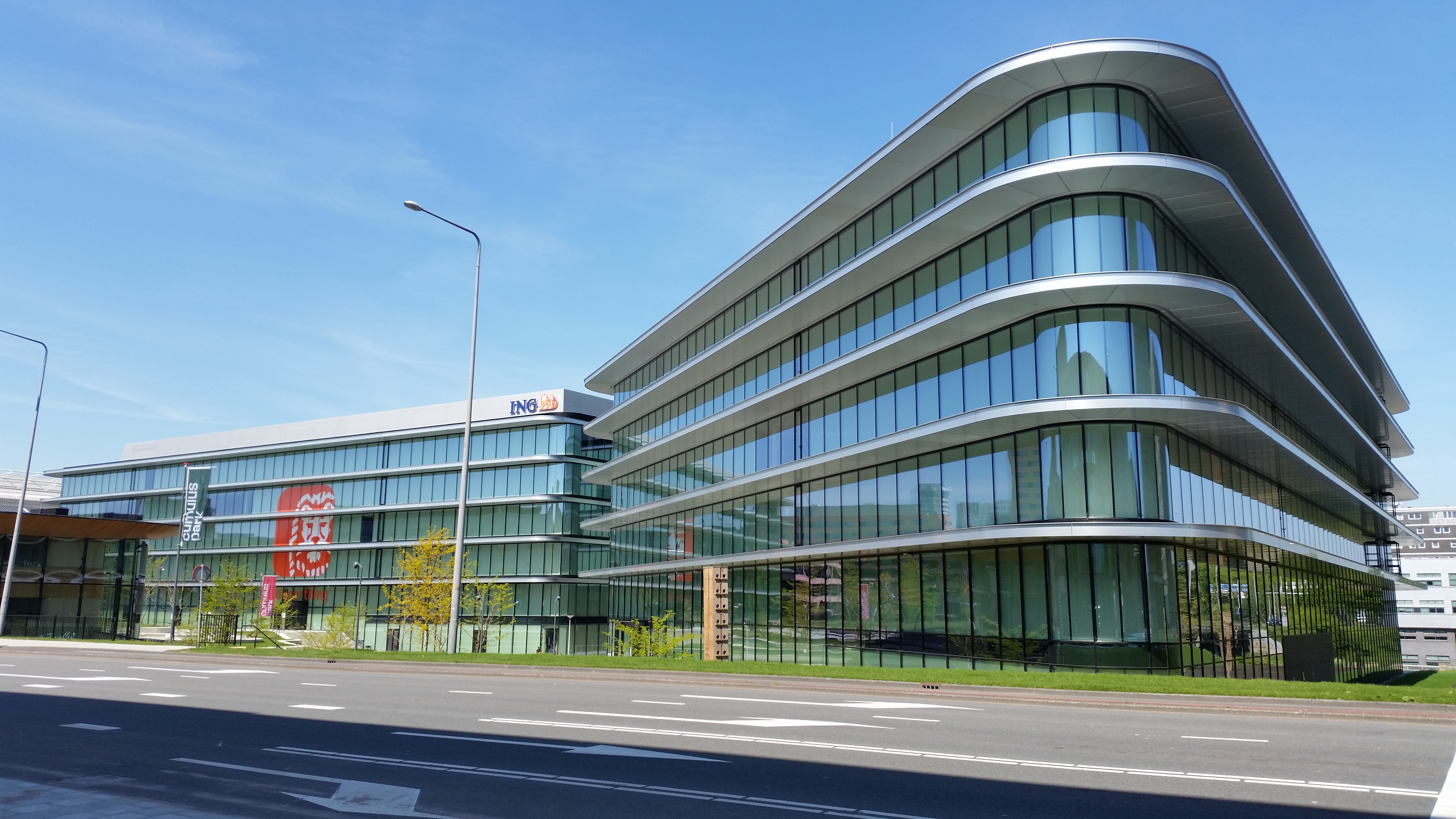
- The Cedar in Amsterdam's neighborhood Bijlmermeer, ING's headquarters since 2020
- Type: Public
- Traded as: Euronext Amsterdam: INGA; NYSE: ING; AEX component
- ISIN: NL0011821202
- Industry: Banking
- Predecessor: Kooger Doodenbos; Rijkspostspaarbank; Postcheque- en Girodienst; Postbank; Nederlandsche Middenstands Bank; NMB Postbank Groep; Nationale-Nederlanden
- Founded: 4 March 1991; 35 years ago
- Headquarters: Cumulus Park, Amsterdam, Netherlands
- Area served: Europe; Asia; Oceania; North America; South America
- Key people: Steven van Rijswijk (CEO); Ida Lerner (CFO); Andrea Cesaroni (CRO); Ljiljana Čortan (Head, Wholesale Banking); Pinar Abay (Head, Retail Banking); Marnix van Stiphout (COO); Daniele Tonella (CTO); Karl Guha (Chairman, Supervisory board)
- Products: Asset management; Banking; Commodities; Credit cards; Equities trading; Investment management; Mortgage loans; Mutual funds; Exchange-traded funds; Index funds; Private equity; Risk management; Wealth management
- Brands: ING
- Revenue: ▲€23.035 billion (2025)
- Operating income: ▼€9.148 billion (2025)
- Net income: ▼€6.327 billion (2025)
- Total assets: ▼€1.054 trillion (2025)
- Total equity: ▼€50.953 billion (2025)
- Number of employees: 62,311 (Q1 2026)
- Divisions: Retail Banking; Wholesale Banking
- Subsidiaries: ING Bank N.V.; ING Belgium S.A./N.V.; ING Luxembourg S.A.; ING-DiBa AG; ING Bank Śląski S.A.; ING Financial Holdings Corporation; ING Bank A.Ş.; ING Bank (Australia) Ltd; ING Commercial Finance B.V.
- Capital ratio: ▲CET1 13,0% (2026)
- Rating: Moody's: A2, Stable; Fitch: AA, Stable; S&P: A+, Stable
- Website: ing.com

The ING Group (Dutch: ING Groep N.V.) is a Dutch multinational banking and financial services corporation headquartered in Amsterdam. Its primary businesses are retail banking, direct banking, commercial banking, investment banking, wholesale banking, private banking, and asset management. With total assets of €1,316 billion (as of March 2026), it consistently ranks among the largest banks globally.

The ING is the Dutch member of the Inter-Alpha Group of Banks, a co-operative consortium of 11 prominent European banks. ING Bank has been a member in the list of global systemically important banks since the list was created in 2011. It has been designated as a Significant Institution since the entry into force of European Banking Supervision in late 2014, and as a consequence is directly supervised by the European Central Bank.

As of the first quarter of 2026, ING served 40.8 million customers across nine retail markets and a wider wholesale banking footprint. It is a component of the EURO STOXX 50 stock market index. As of December 2019, the long-term debt for the company is €150 billion. ING is an abbreviation of Internationale Nederlanden Groep (lit. 'International Netherlands Group'). The ING's logo alludes to the Dutch symbolism used by several of ING's corporate predecessors, including Postbank. Its original blue lion symbol was refreshed in 2000, and later replaced by the orange variant between 2007 and 2009.

== History ==
=== Origins in insurance and banking ===
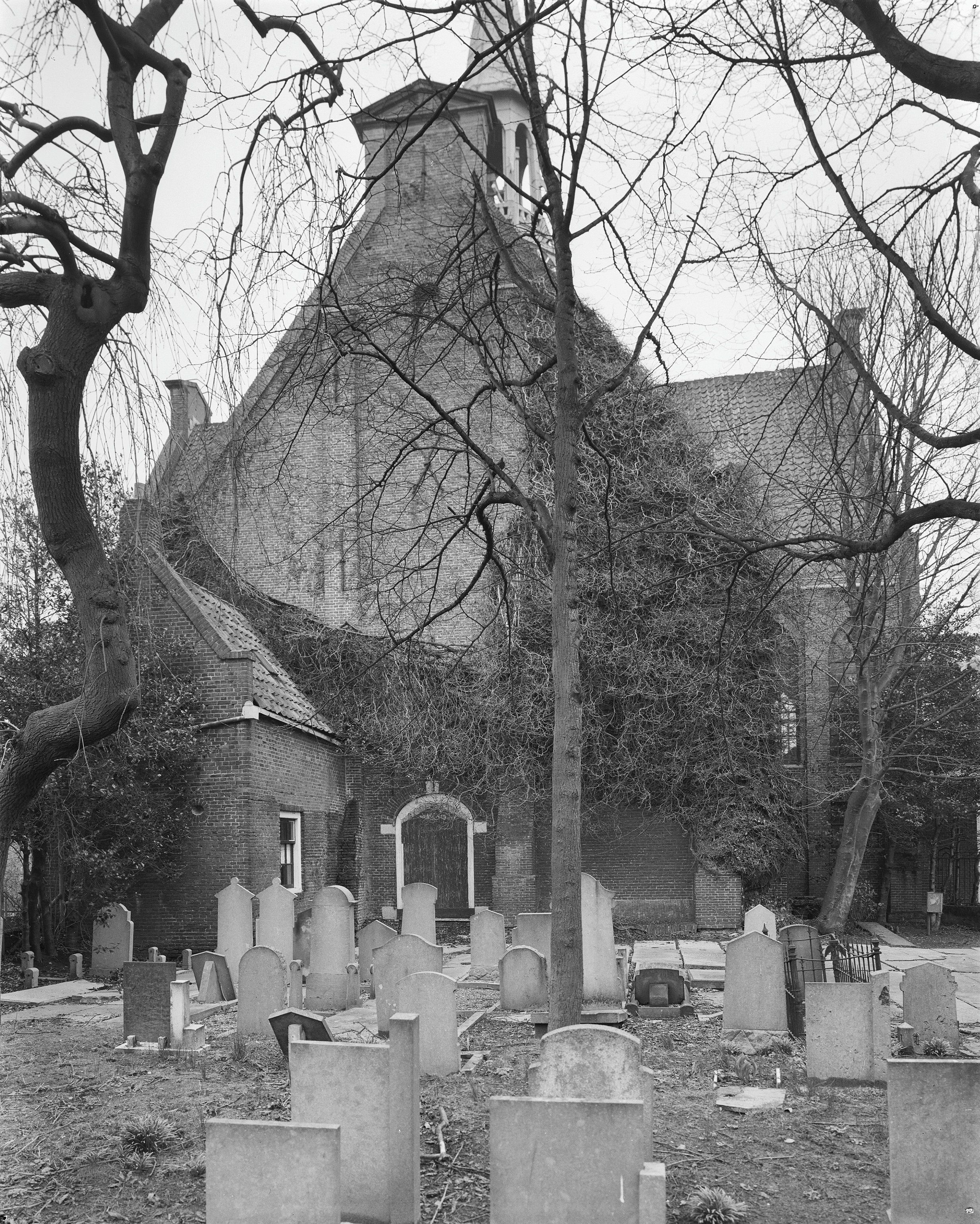
Reformed church with the cemetery in Koog aan de Zaan, where the burial fund Kooger Doodenbos set up in 1743 made ING history

The ING Group traces its roots to two major insurance companies in the Netherlands and the banking services of the Dutch government. Its oldest predecessor was the burial fund Kooger Doodenbos, founded in 1743 in Koog aan de Zaan in North Holland, by nine local men. They declared that they were entering into a contract with one another "for the collection and deposit of funds, which are to be used for a proper burial of the partners of the said contract".

An initial sum of fl. 300 was transferred to the savings bank in 1820, and by 1835 the fund decided to stop distributing its surplus cash and invest it in the bank or in securities instead. In 1949, the Kooger Doodenbos — contributing an insured capital of fl. 30,915 and 229 contracts — merged into Vesta, a birth-benefit life insurer that had relocated from Amsterdam to Arnhem. Through a series of further mergers, it eventually became part of Nationale-Nederlanden.

==== Insurance branch ====
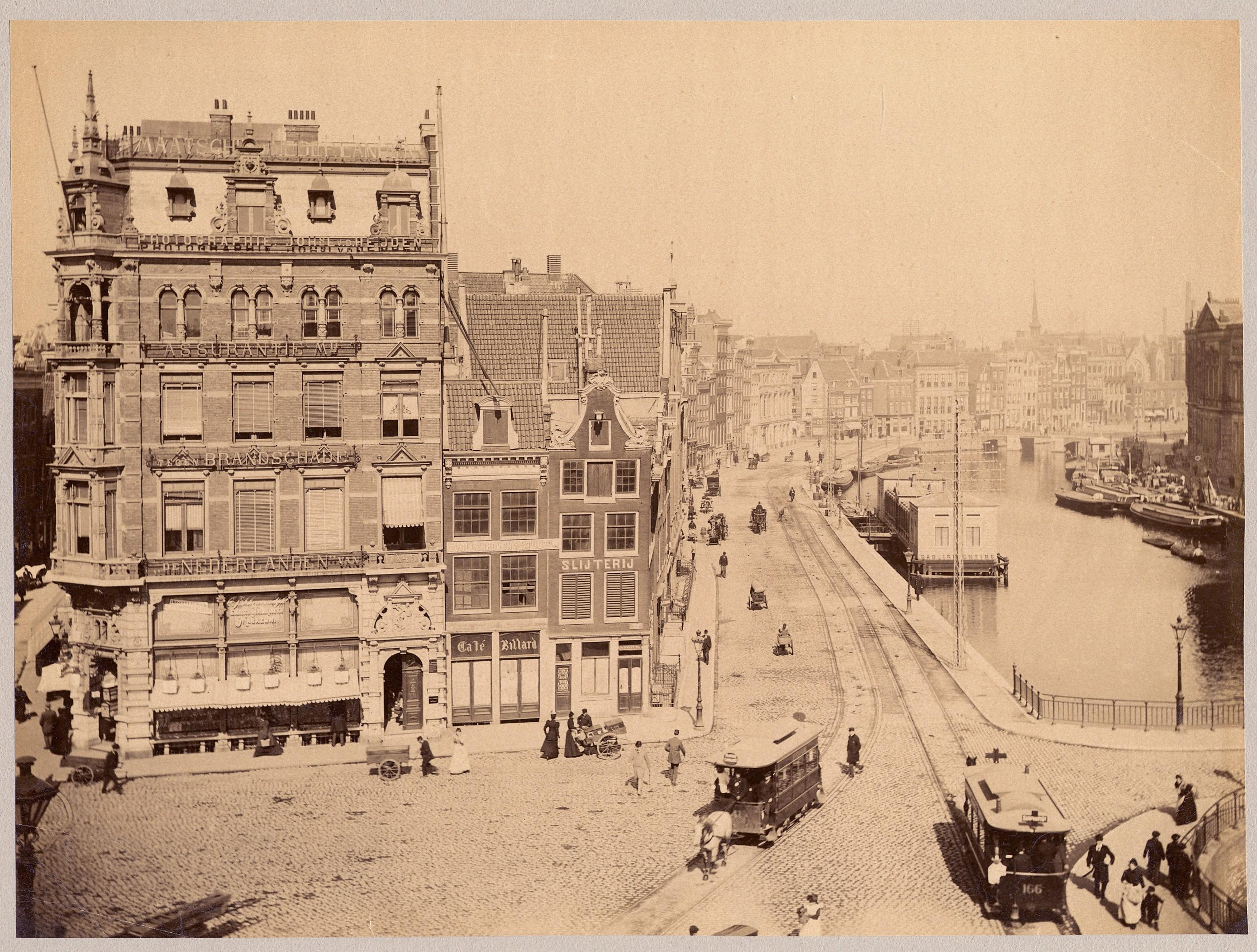
Office of the Fire Insurance Company of the Netherlands of 1845, at the Muntplein square in Amsterdam, ca. 1890

On 12 April 1845, the fire insurance company Assurantie Maatschappij tegen Brandschade de Nederlanden van 1845 ("Fire Insurance Company of the Netherlands of 1845") was founded, as approved by King Willem II. The company grew to be the leading Dutch insurance company, opening its first foreign agency in Batavia (now Jakarta) in 1857 and reaching branches across 139 locations worldwide by 1900. It later changed its name to De Nederlanden van 1845.

Two decades later, in 1863, the life insurance company Nationale Levensverzekerings Bank ("National Life Insurance Bank") was founded in Rotterdam. From 1932, the two companies cooperated on group insurance and pension insurance, and in 1938 De Nederlanden van 1845 acquired its first foreign insurer, De Vaderlandsche in Belgium. During World War II, the offices of both companies were bombed and 46 employees were killed. The two firms merged on 3 April 1963, to form Nationale-Nederlanden, combining the country's largest insurer with its second-largest. The new group expanded significantly internationally during the 1970s and 1980s, introducing its iconic orange N logo in 1970. In 1986, Nationale-Nederlanden expanded its portfolio to include the banking sector, becoming the sole owner of the struggling mortgage bank Westland-Utrecht Hypotheekbank.

==== Banking branch ====
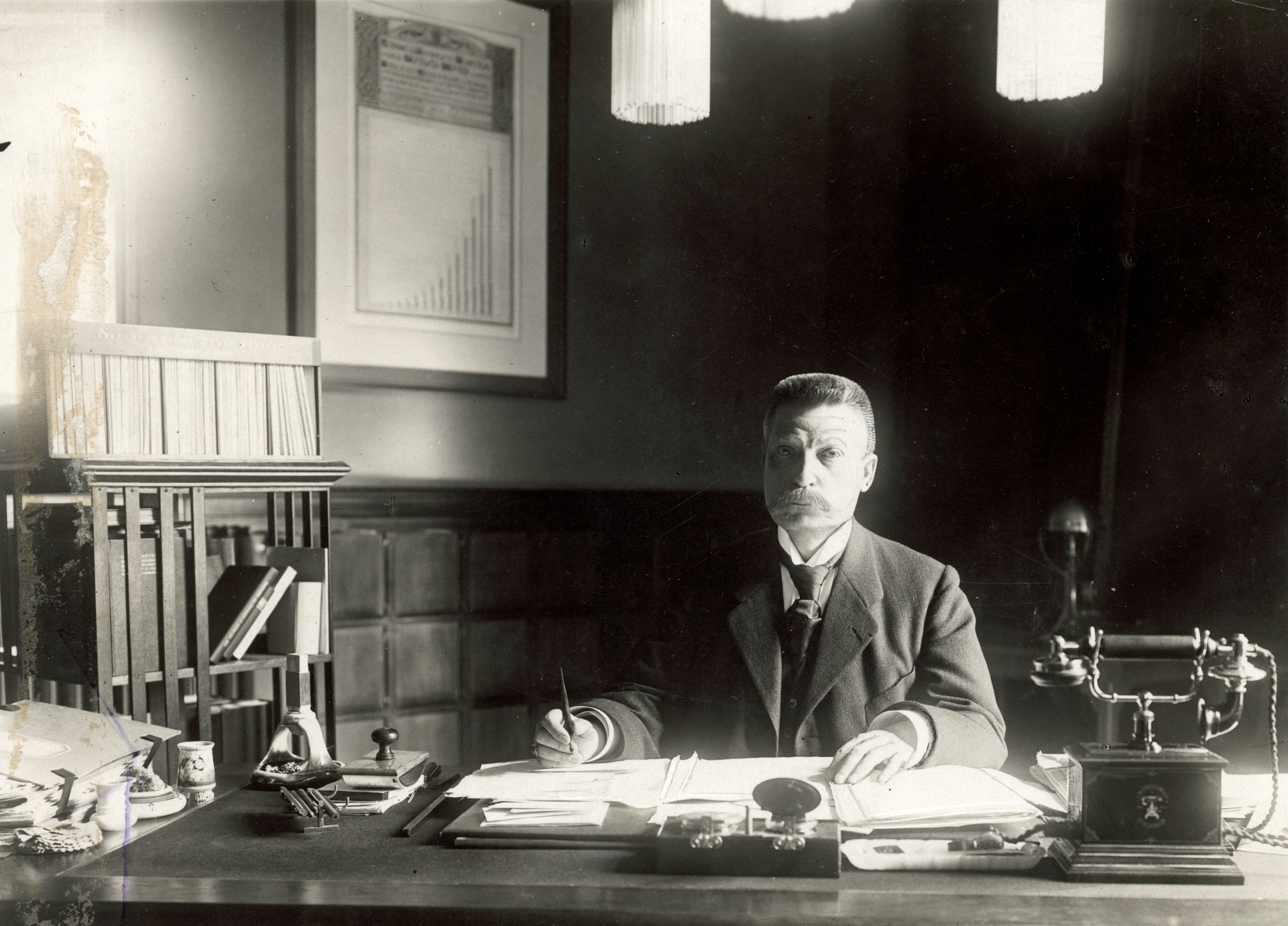
Johan Herman Carel Bussing, the newly-appointed director of the Rijkspostspaarbank, at his desk, in 1913

In April 1881, the Rijkspostspaarbank was created with the statutory task of providing savings opportunities to broad Dutch population by leveraging the existing post-office network into a postal savings system, to encourage workers to start saving. Around 1916, the municipally-run Gemeentegiro Amsterdam (GGA) was established to centralize Amsterdam's municipal cash transactions, opening its services to private individuals in 1918. In 1961, the GGA became the first bank in the Netherlands to issue plastic payment cards (giropassen), and in 1969 it introduced the country's first automated teller machine, installed in Amsterdam's newly built district Bijlmermeer.

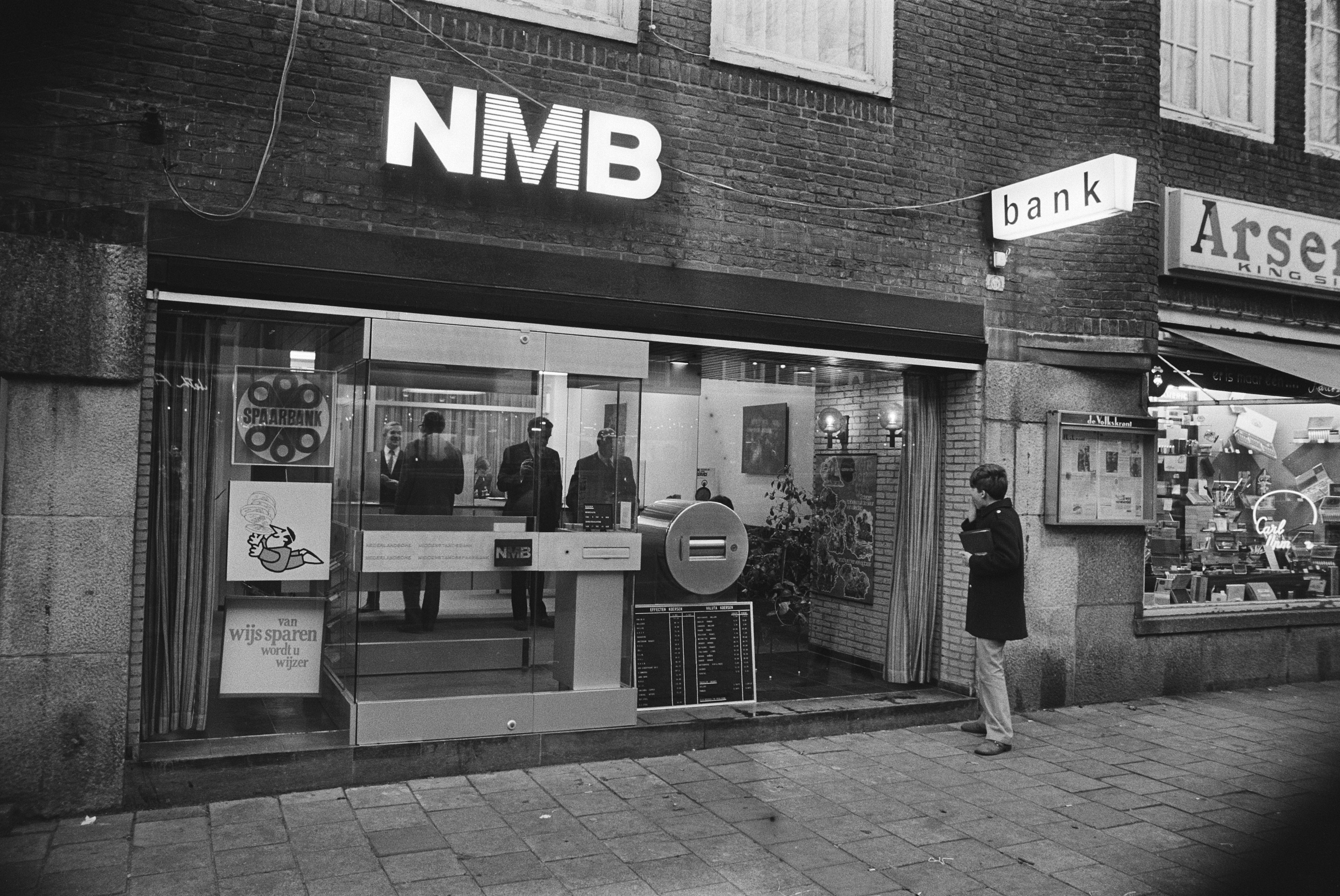
Branch of the Nederlandse Middenstands Bank on Beethovenstraat in Amsterdam, pictured in 1970

In 1918, the Postcheque- en Girodienst (PCGD) was established as part of the state telecommunication company PTT, creating the Netherlands' first national giro-based payment services allowing working families and SMEs to manage their income and expenses through post offices. In 1965, the PCGD became the first fully automated giro system in the world, and in 1979 it took over the GGA, bringing Amsterdam's municipal giro services under national administration. These state-run postal financial services were brought under the official prudential supervision of the Dutch central bank from 1979.

Separately, in 1927 the Nederlandsche Middenstands Bank (NMB) was created through the merger of several institutions — to provide credit to middle-class and SME businesses in the Netherlands and abroad, following the Dutch banking crisis of the early 1920s. During World War II, the Dutch government took over 86% of NMB's capital, and its gradual privatization continued until the turn of the 1980s and 1990s. During the 1960s, NMB increasingly focused on the retail market and expanded internationally.

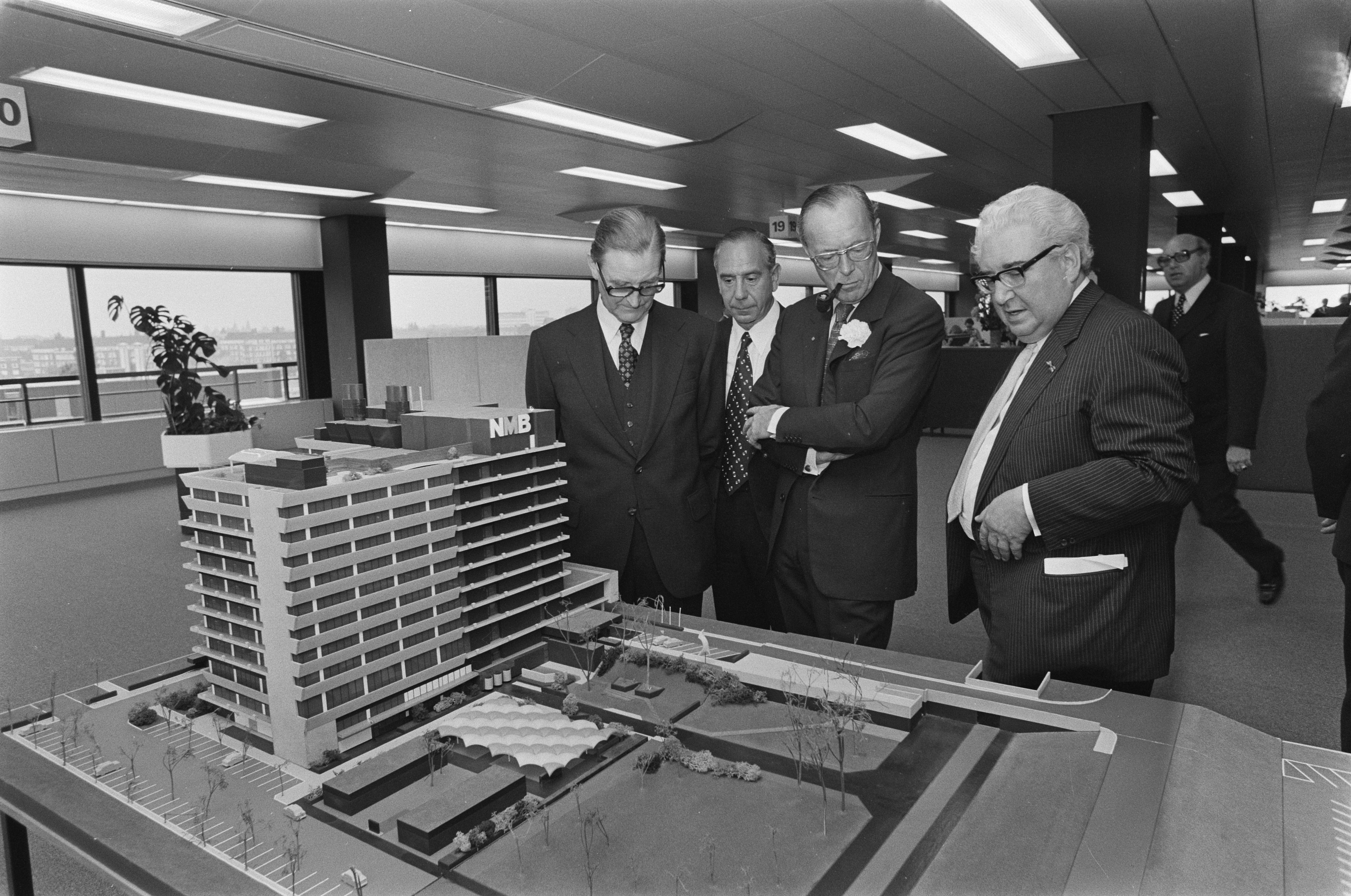
Prince Bernhard opens the new NMB building in Amsterdam, June 1974

In 1986, the Rijkspostspaarbank and the PCGD were combined to form the single banking entity Postbank, and had more than 7.5 million private account holders. That year, Postbank introduced Girotel, the first electronic home banking system in the Netherlands (by 2006, it had evolved into the internet platform MijnPostbank, used by 2 million customers). The Dutch government formally privatized Postbank in 1987, and it entered the free market subject to restrictions barring it from commercial lending, corporate securities trading and selling insurance — limits that constrained its ability to compete as an independent commercial bank. In 1989, Postbank merged with the NMB to form NMB Postbank Groep, which became one of the five largest Dutch banks of the time.

=== Merger and formation of ING Group ===
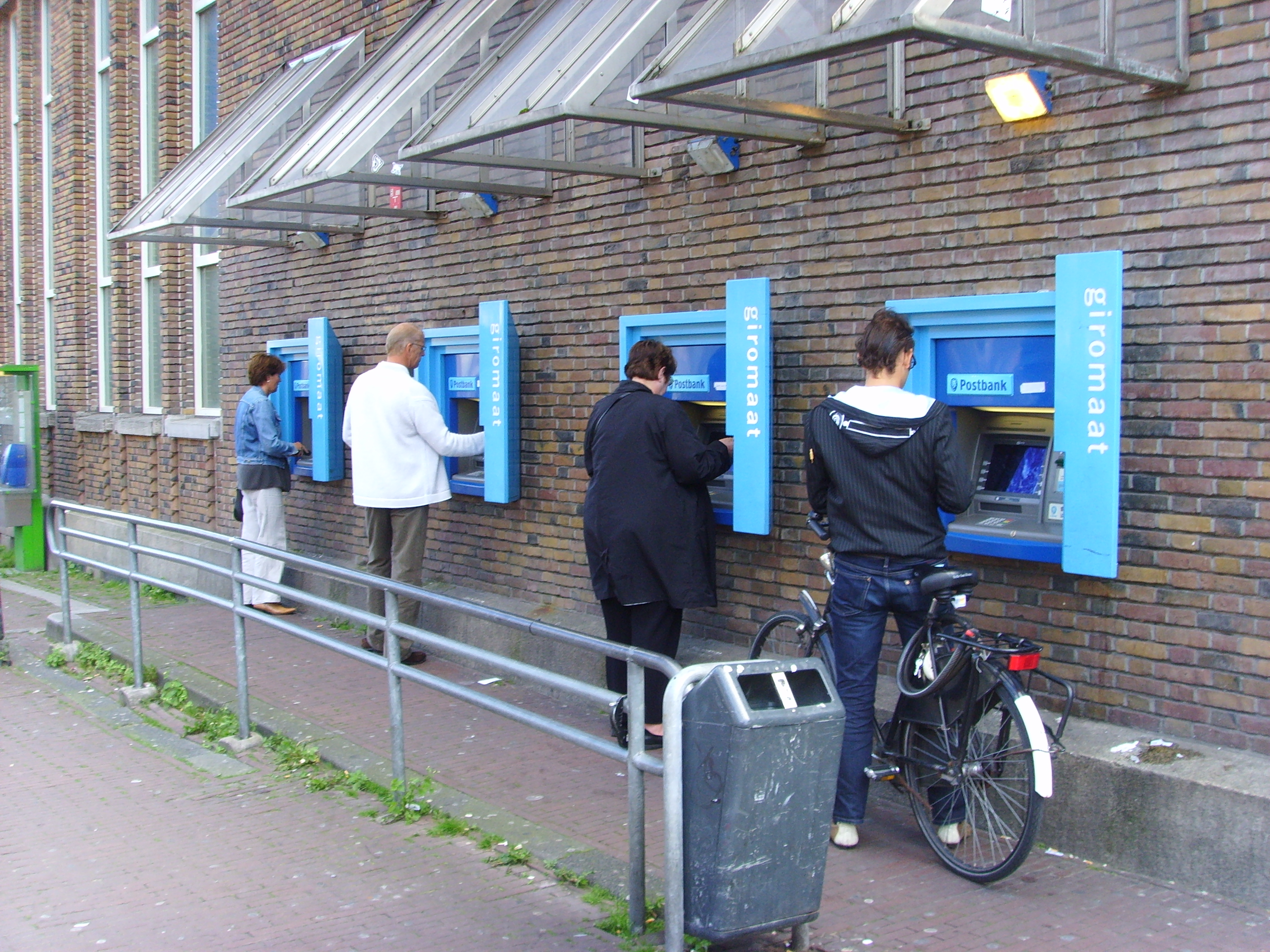
Postbank ATMs on Potterstraat, next to the main post office in Utrecht, in 2008

In 1991, the banking business of NMB Postbank Groep and the insurance business of Nationale-Nederlanden were merged to create the ING Group. The merger, completed on 4 March 1991, was made possible by the liberalization of Dutch financial law in 1990, which permitted cross-ownership between banking and insurance institutions. A decade prior, in 1981, Nationale-Nederlanden and Aegon rescued struggling regional mortgage banks, a move facilitated by the Minister of Finance and considered the first step toward lifting the ban on cross-sector mergers in the Netherlands.

The newly formed group adopted a bancassurance model, distributing Nationale-Nederlanden's insurance products through Postbank's extensive retail deposit base. The 1990 liberalization made the Netherlands a pioneer in bancassurance, and the rapid emergence of conglomerates like ING prompted the 1990 Protocol, which mandated strict cooperation and information exchange between banking and insurance supervisors. Aad Jacobs served as the group's first chairman, to integrate NMB's SME franchise, Postbank's mass retail deposits and Nationale-Nederlanden's insurance float.

=== International expansion and major acquisitions ===
Chart showing the formation of the ING Group

Since its founding, ING Group has grown through a sustained program of acquisitions. Throughout the 1990s, ING broadened its asset management capabilities through the purchase of Parcom (1994) and Clarion (1998), and expanded in insurance through Wellington (1995), Equitable of Iowa (1997, for US$2.2 billion). By then, ING operated in 58 countries and was the Netherlands' largest insurer and third-largest bank. In 1998, ING sold its U.S. general insurance subsidiary, the Netherlands Insurance Group of Cos., to British insurer Guardian Royal Exchange Group for $775 million, while acquiring Guardian's Canadian insurance unit for $375 million.

Banking operations were also strengthened through the acquisitions of Furman Selz for US$600 million, and the gradual purchase of Dutch cash-management specialist Bank Mendes Gans, whose remaining shares ING acquired by 2000, when the company was delisted from the Amsterdam Stock Exchange. Separately, ING acquired Bank Brussels Lambert after launching a bid in 1997 valued at US$4.68 billion, with European Commission clearance granted in January 1998, establishing ING's leading position in the Belgian market. In 1999, ING took over the German BHF-Bank and Canadian Group Underwriters.

The early 2000s brought further geographic expansion: Aetna's financial services and international units (for US$7.7 billion), and ReliaStar (for US$6.1 billion) (both 2000), Seguros Comercial América in Latin America (2001), and DiBa in Germany (2002). In 2004, ING added Alliance of Canada to its insurance portfolio and Rodamco Asia to its asset management operations. In the same year, it agreed to sell most of ING BHF-Bank to the German bank Sal. Oppenheim for €600 million, transferring €6 billion in risk-weighted assets and around 1,800 employees, while retaining certain assets under the name ING Bank Deutschland and selling the London branch to Deutsche Postbank.

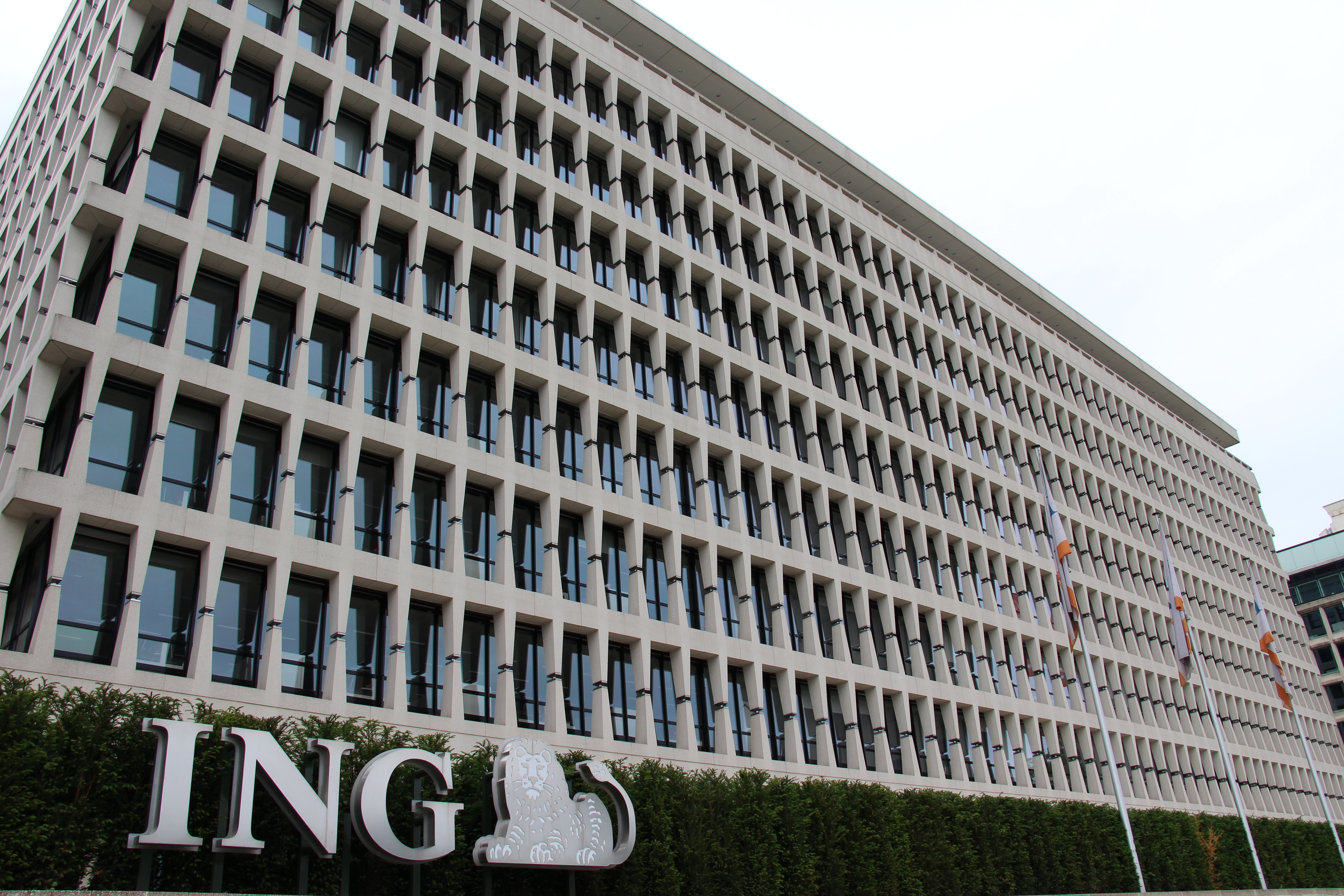
The Marnix on Avenue Marnix in Brussels, designed by Gordon Bunshaft, the 1965 headquarters of Bank Brussels Lambert, acquired by ING in 1998

Expanding its retail banking business overseas, ING used the direct banking business model it had developed with NMB Postbank to launch direct banking in other countries. The first of these was set up in Canada in 1997 as ING Bank of Canada, and was soon followed in several other countries including the US, UK, Germany, Spain, Italy, France and Australia. In July 2007, ING paid $1.3 billion for the Latin American pensions business of Banco Santander, becoming the region's second-largest behind BBVA and increasing Latin American funds under management to €35.5 billion.

By early 2008, ING Direct had grown to 20 million customers in nine countries, with €210 billion in deposits and close to €90 billion in mortgages, contributing about 7% of group profits in 2006. In 2008, ING acquired CitiStreet — an American retirement-plan and benefit administration company, with more than 14 million participants — from Citigroup and State Street Corporation for €578 million.

==== Barings Bank ====
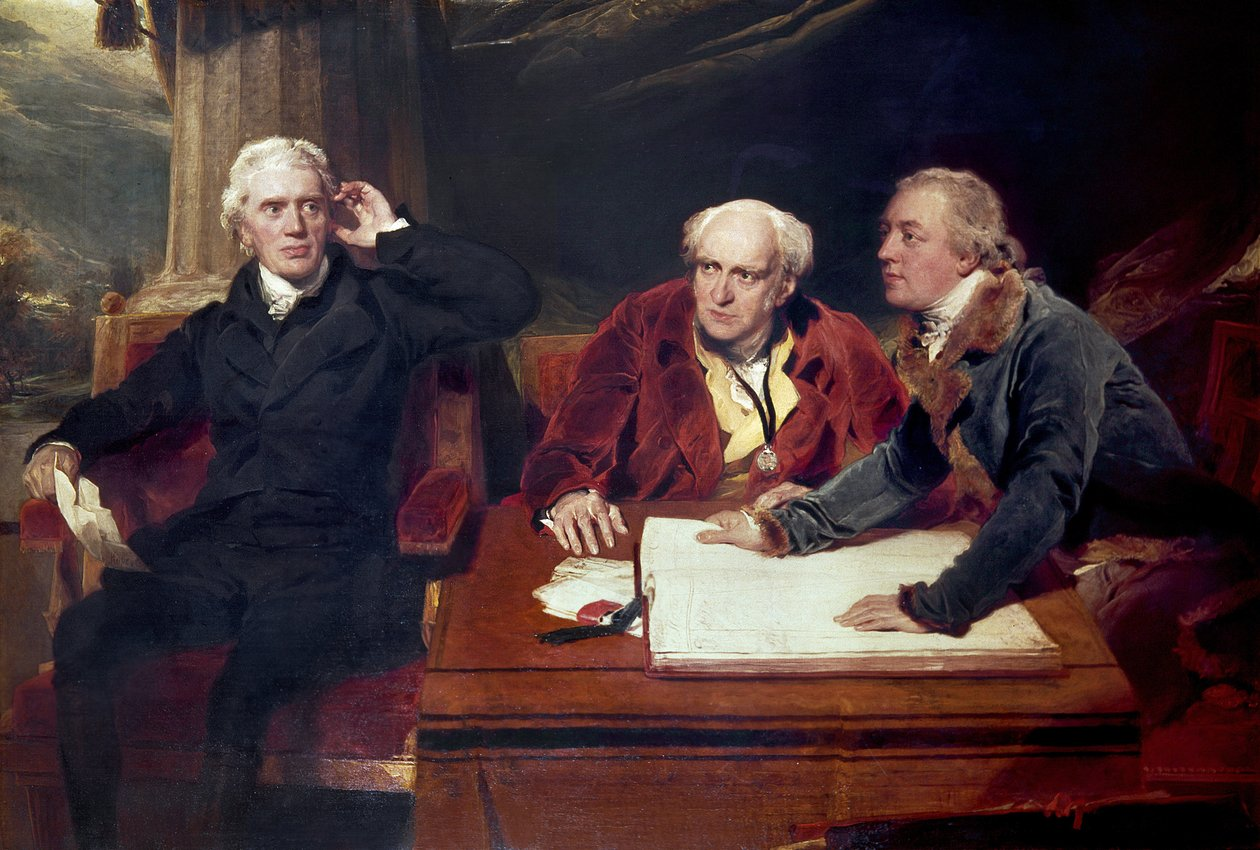
Portrait of merchant bankers Francis and John Barings, and Charles Wall, by Thomas Lawrence, from the Barings art collection acquired by ING in 1995

The 1995 purchase of Barings Bank for a symbolic £1 after its dramatic collapse led to a boost in ING's wholesale and investment banking business. Barings was founded in 1762 by Francis Baring, a British-born member of the German–British Baring family of merchants and bankers, and was, after Berenberg Bank, one of England's oldest merchant banks.

In 1995, the 233-year-old bank collapsed after Nick Leeson — the 28-year-old head of Barings Futures Singapore — accumulated £830 million in catastrophic unauthorized losses on Nikkei 225 futures contracts, concealed in an error account. His positions were destroyed by the plunge in the Nikkei following the Kobe earthquake of 17 January 1995. Barings was declared insolvent on 26 February 1995 and Leeson was subsequently sentenced to six and a half years in a Singapore prison. ING acquired Barings for £1, assuming its liabilities and establishing ING Barings — gaining an investment-banking platform, international brand recognition and the historic Barings Archive. In 2001, ING sold the US operations of ING Barings to ABN AMRO for US$275 million. The Barings art collection and the charitable Baring Foundation remain based at ING's London office.

=== Acquisition of Oyak Bank ===
In June 2007, ING announced the acquisition of the Turkish bank Oyak Bank for US$2.673 billion, marking its entry into the Turkish market. Oyak Bank, founded in 1984, was among the ten largest banks in Turkey with a market share of around 3%. The bank had a total of 360 branches, 1.2 million active retail customers and 10,000 SME customers. In 2006, the bank reported a pre-tax profit of 165 million Turkish lira (€94.6 million), with total assets of 11.8 billion Turkish lira (€6.77 billion) and a book value of TRY 988 million (€566 million).

=== Capital injection and divestiture ===
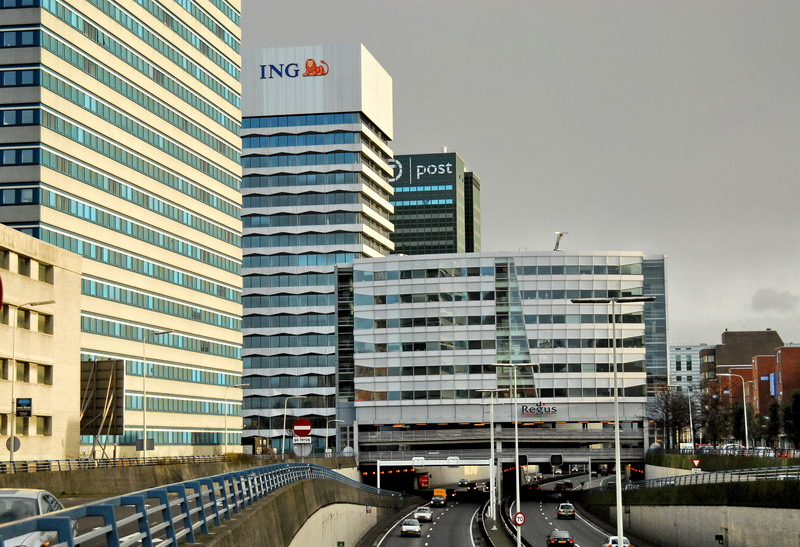
ING offices over the Utrechtsebaan in The Hague Center, pictured in 2007

In 2008, as part of the 2008 financial crisis, ING Group, together with many other major banks in the Netherlands, accepted a capital injection from the Dutch government (see § Government capital injection and state aid below). Following reports of alleged capital shortfalls, on Friday, 17 October 2008, ING's share price fell by more than 27%. ING also recorded a loss of €500 million in the third quarter of 2008, its first quarterly loss ever, and a reported net loss of €729 million for the full year. As a condition of Dutch state aid, the EU demanded changes to the company structure, including the sale of insurance businesses in Latin America, Asia, Canada, Australia and New Zealand, and ING Direct units in the US, Canada, and the UK. This included the sale of the ING Direct US operations to Capital One, ING Direct Canada to Scotiabank (doing business as Tangerine), and the ING Direct UK operations to Barclays Bank in 2012. The spun-off insurance businesses in North America were renamed Voya Financial in 2014.

Origins of the ING logo

The lion figure and the color orange allude to the Dutch symbolism. A lion was used by several ING's corporate predecessors including Postbank. For its 2000 rebranding, B.J.L. Huizer and E.R.R. de Vries designed a blue lying lion. Between 2007 and 2009, it was phased out in favor of the orange variant when Postbank was absorbed into ING.

In 2009, Postbank and ING Bank were merged into a single brand, ING. The merger was completed in January 2009 under CEO Nick Jue. The rebranding officially launched on 10 February 2009, costing €890 million and 2,500 jobs, largely driven by Postbank's historical inability to sell complex, higher-margin financial products. In October 2009, ING announced that its insurance arm would again be separated from ING Group. In April 2016, ING sold the last shares in NN Group, making it exclusively a bank again.

== Government capital injection and state aid ==
In October 2008, in a move to increase its core Tier 1 capital ratio above 8%, ING Group accepted a capital injection plan from the Dutch Government. The plan supplied €10 billion (US$13.5 billion) to the operation, in exchange for securities and veto rights on major operational changes and investments. As a further condition of the state aid, the European Commission required ING to divest itself of its insurance and investment management operations (see § Corporate restructuring below).

=== Repayment of the capital injection ===
In December 2009, ING Group repaid half of the state aid (€5 billion, plus interest and an agreed early-repayment premium) through a rights issue that raised €7.5 billion. A dispute between ING and the Dutch government on one side and the European Commission on the other, concerning the partial withholding of approval, was referred to the Court of Justice of the European Union.

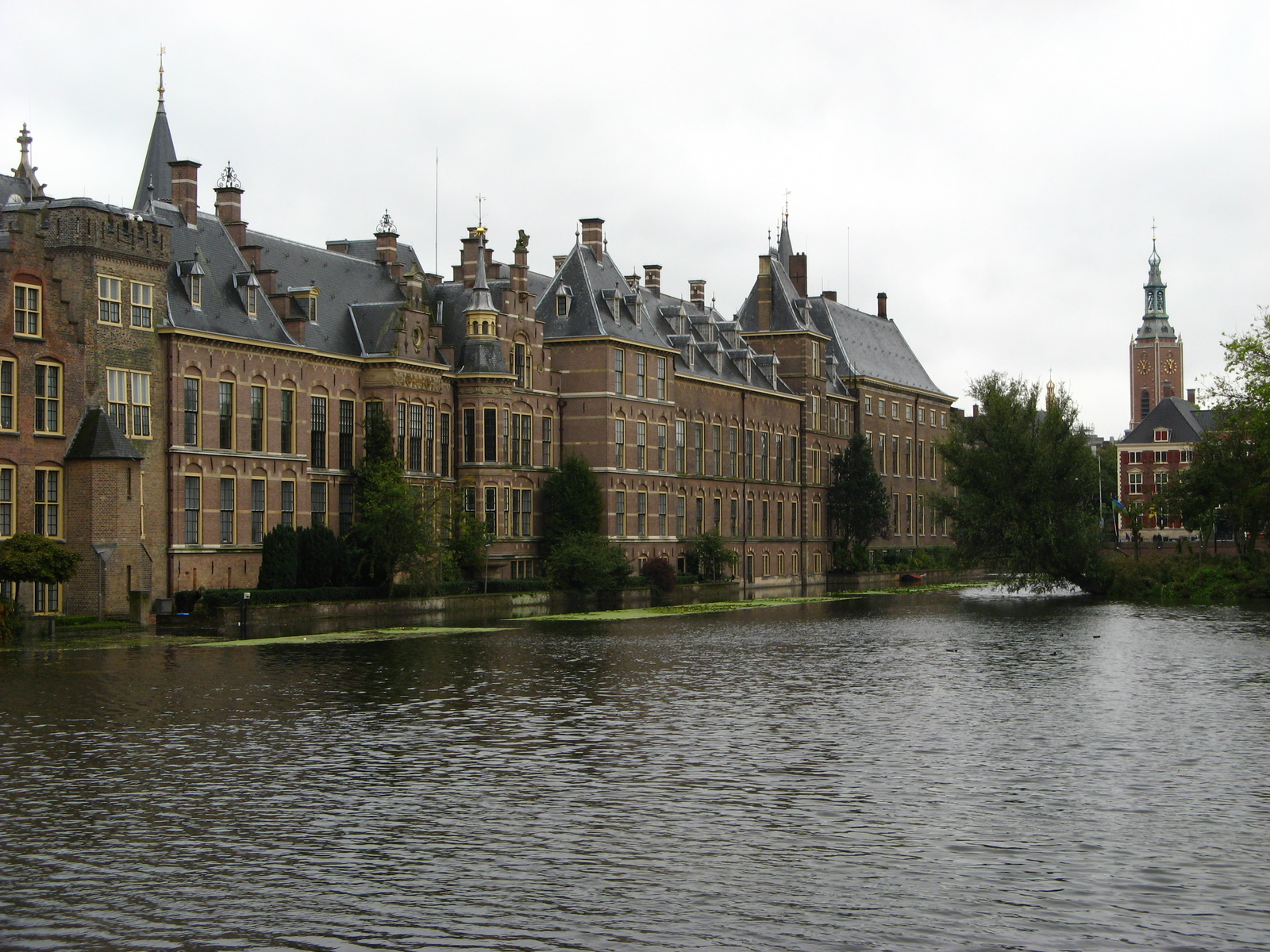
The Binnenhof, the parliament complex on the Hofvijver lake in The Hague

In May 2011, ING Group repaid a further €2 billion in a second tranche, plus a 50% premium, bringing the total payment to €3 billion; by then a total of €8.6 billion had flowed back to the State. The bank stated its intention to repay the remaining €3 billion of the state loan by May 2012 at the latest. On 26 November 2012, ING Group repaid a further €1.125 billion, and on 6 November 2013 another €1.125 billion was transferred to the State. On 25 March 2014, it was announced that ING would repay a penultimate tranche of €1.225 billion – €100 million more than planned – with a final payment of €1.025 billion to follow by May 2015 at the latest.

On 7 November 2014, ING repaid the final tranche of state aid; with this payment, ING had repaid a total of €13.5 billion to the Dutch State, representing an average annual return of 12.7% for the State.

In early 2011, public debate arose over ING's intention to once again award its CEO a substantial bonus, which many considered particularly inappropriate given that ING was still dependent on state aid at the time. In response, the Dutch House of Representatives adopted a motion to fully and retroactively tax away bonuses at banks receiving state aid, and the Minister of Finance announced a statutory ban on bonuses for directors of banks receiving state support.

Under the original terms, ING was permitted to fully or partially repurchase the core capital securities issued to the Dutch State for €15 per unit. The Dutch State classified these securities as Tier 1 capital. The State ranked equally with holders of ordinary shares, but dilution for existing shareholders was limited. On the trading day following the announcement of the capital injection, ING's share price rose 29.24%.

=== Alt-A mortgage guarantees ===
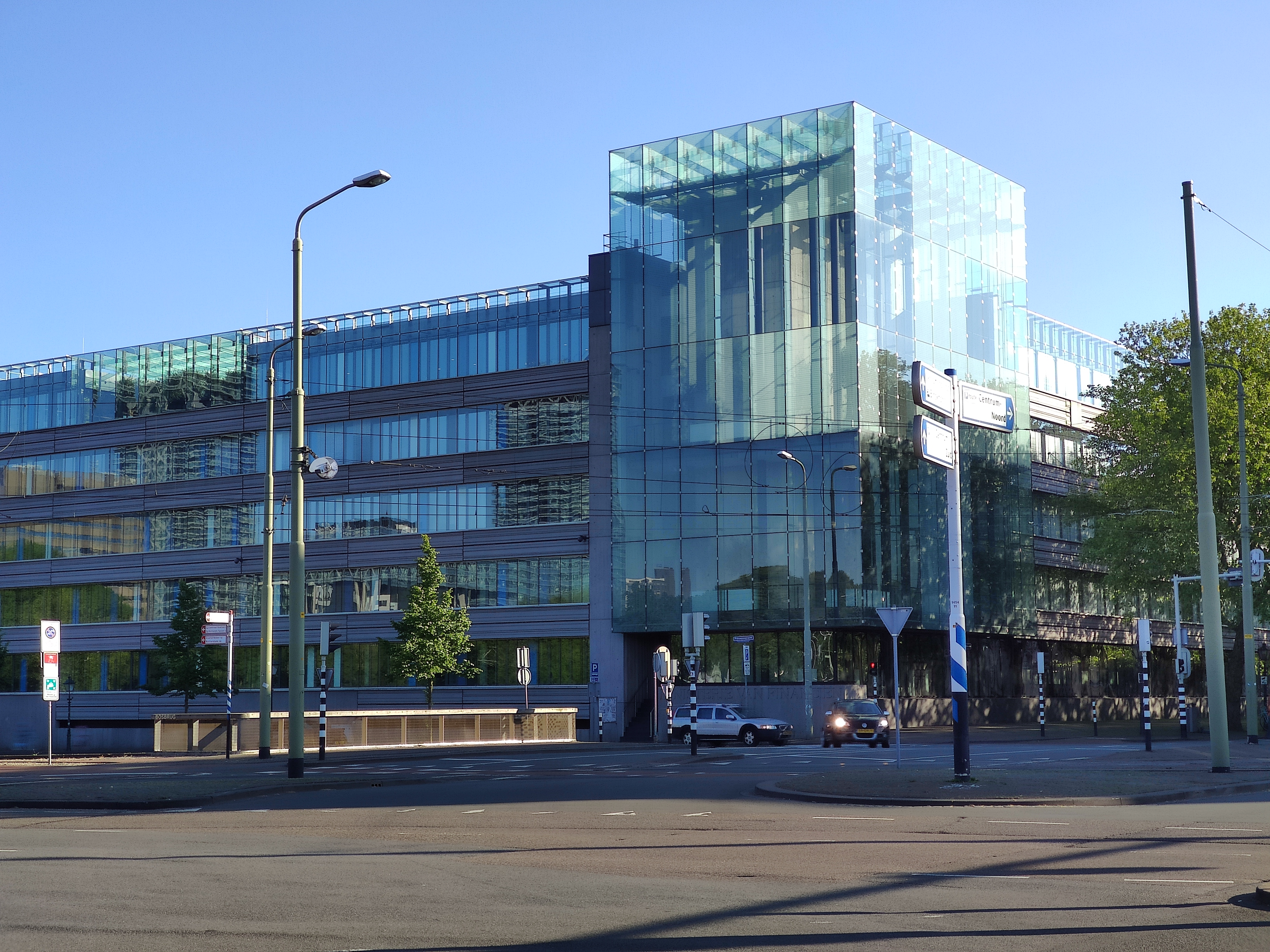
Headquarters of the Dutch Ministry of Finance in The Hague

On 26 January 2009, ING Group and the Ministry of Finance announced that the Dutch State would provide an 80% guarantee on the value of a €27.7 billion portfolio of U.S. Alt-A mortgages held in the portfolios of subsidiaries ING Direct and ING Insurance Americas. The arrangement was named the Illiquid Assets Back-up Facility (IABF). As part of the deal, ING committed to extending €25 billion in loans to Dutch clients. CEO Michel Tilmant resigned, and was succeeded by Jan Hommen. The dismissal of 7,000 employees was announced.

The Financial Times described the move as a clever move by the Dutch authorities, while questioning whether it concealed €5 billion in disguised state aid. In September 2009, the European Commission concluded that the transaction constituted (prohibited) state aid, as it judged that ING had not paid sufficiently for the guarantee.

By September 2010, through repayments and refinancing, the size of the portfolio had fallen from €30.9 billion to €23.8 billion, although its average quality had declined. Up to that point, the State had made a profit of €461 million on the arrangement, which was reserved to absorb expected future losses.

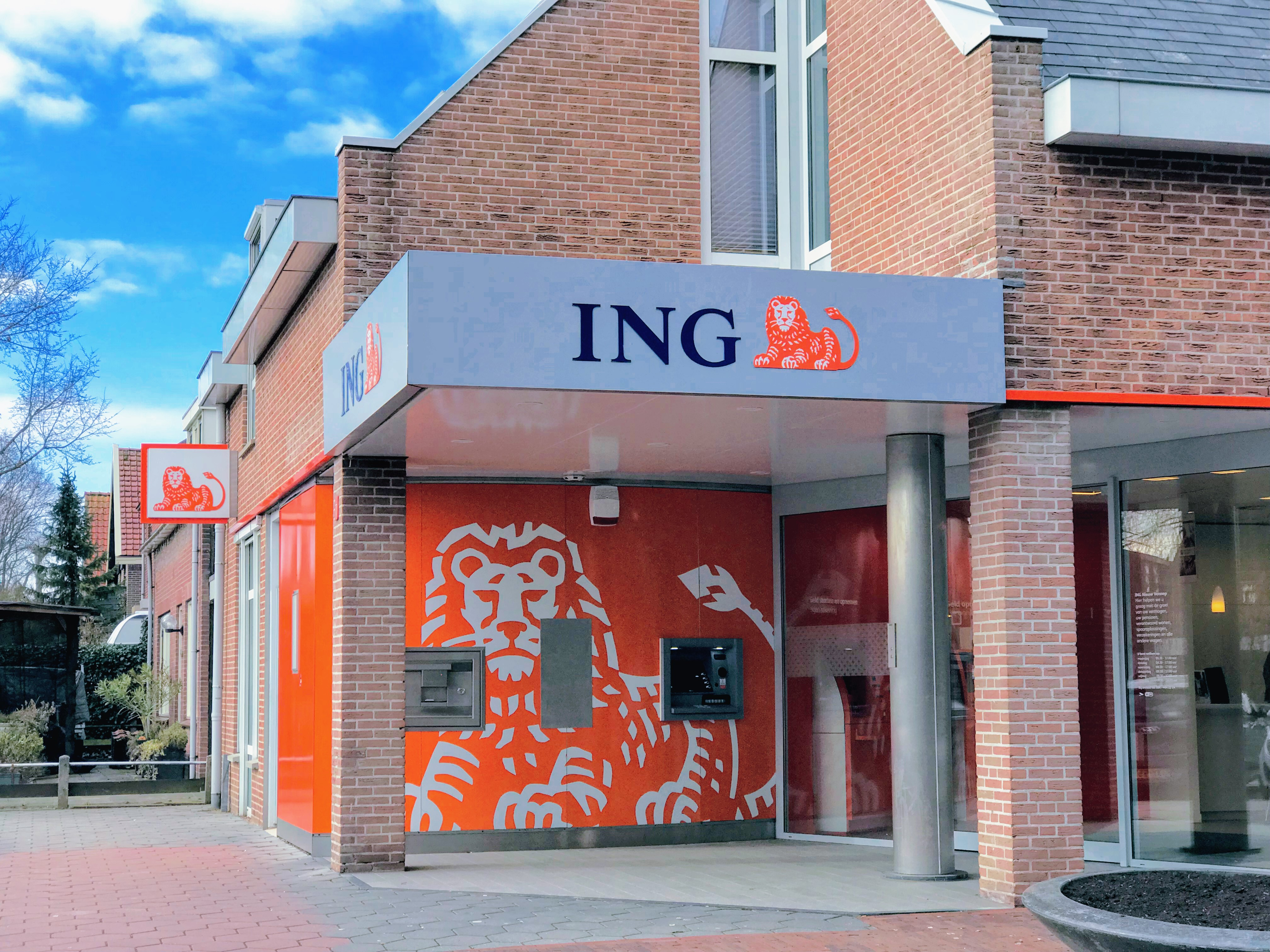
ING branch on Venneperhof in Nieuw-Vennep, in North Holland, in 2018

On 1 November 2013, ING and the Dutch State reached an agreement to terminate the IABF. Under the agreement, the IABF in its existing form would be wound down, regular fee payments would be settled, and the remaining conditions of the IABF agreement would lapse. The Dutch State intended to sell the Alt-A securities on the market over the following year. At then-current market prices, the Alt-A portfolio had a market value of €6.4 billion as of 1 November 2013; the proceeds of a sale at that price would be sufficient to repay ING's remaining €6.0 billion loan, leaving a profit of €0.4 billion for the State. The agreement was finalized on 17 December 2013. The government's right to appoint two members of ING's supervisory board lapsed, and the remaining government-appointed supervisory board members no longer held greater voting rights on certain decisions than their fellow supervisors. On 4 February 2014, the final portion of the Alt-A portfolio still held by the State was sold at auction to Credit Suisse. Two days later, it was reported that the rescue operation had yielded the State a profit of €1.4 billion – €1 billion more than had been expected as of the previous November.

== Corporate restructuring (2009–2016) ==
As of 2008, before the onset of the financial crisis, ING provided banking, insurance, and asset management services to more than 85 million customers in over 40 countries. With 125,000 employees and a balance sheet total of €1,332 billion, it was one of the largest financial institutions in the world. The state aid came with stringent conditions. Following consultation with the Dutch government, ING undertook a far-reaching restructuring plan intended to restore its long-term commercial viability while preventing the state aid from excessively distorting competition.

In April 2009, new chief executive Jan Hommen unveiled a "back to basics" strategy under which ING would sell 10 to 15 businesses worth a cumulative €6–8 billion, freeing up an estimated €4 billion in capital and narrowing its lending focus to Europe. A key measure was the sale of all insurance activities by the end of 2013. In addition, ING was required to divest Westland Utrecht Hypotheekbank in order to strengthen competition in the Dutch retail banking market. Finally, ING was temporarily barred from acquiring other companies and from pursuing price leadership.

=== Splitting of the ING Group ===
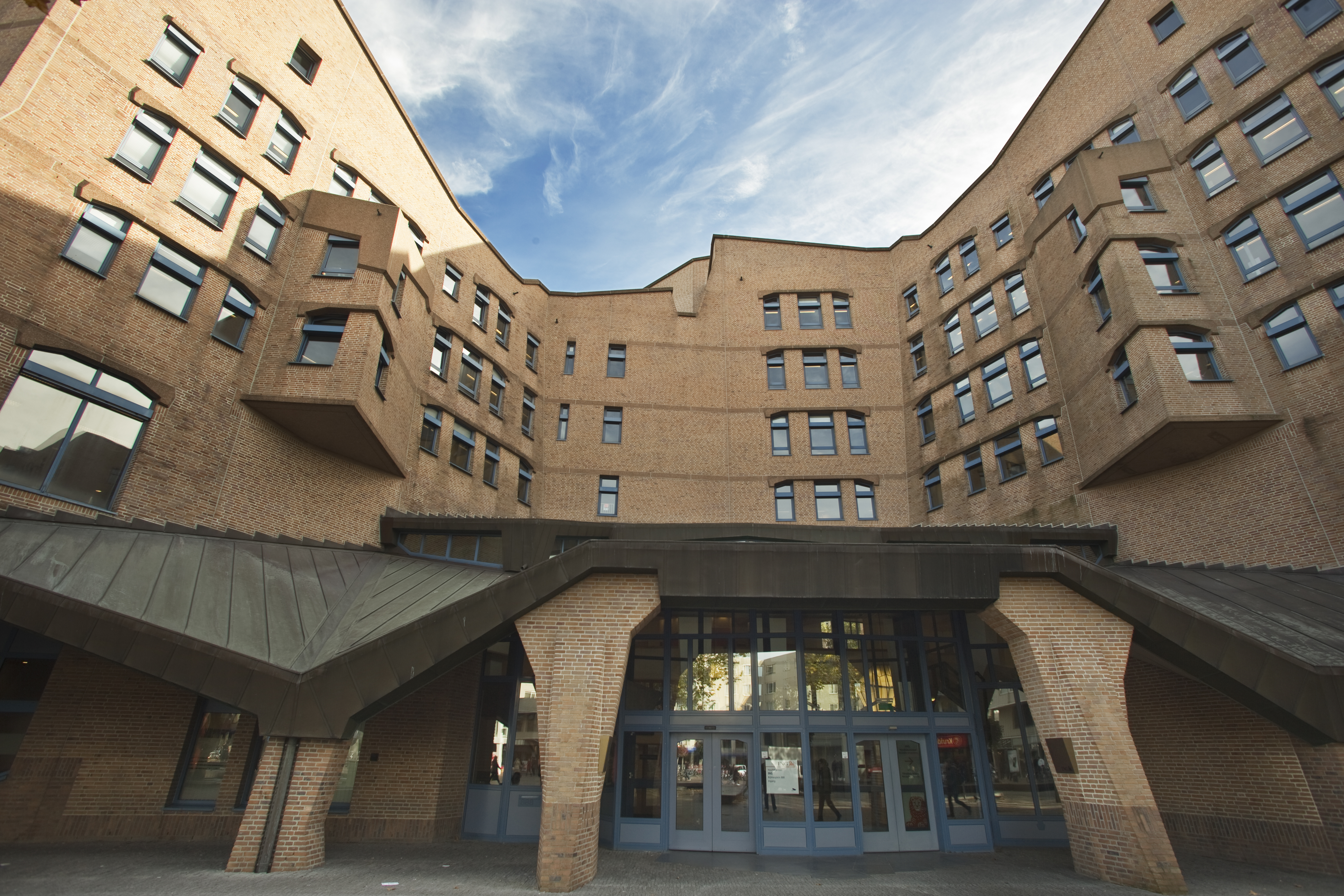
ING Group's headquarters in Amsterdam-Noord, at the time of the split

The restructuring process began in 2009. Within the group, the two main divisions were organizationally separated from one another. At the time, the banking business had assets of €912 billion (13th in Europe), while the insurance business had revenue of $64 billion (sixth in the world). Since 1 January 2011, ING Bank has operated as an independent company, separate from ING's insurance and investment management operations.

ING Bank consists of two divisions: Retail Banking and Wholesale Banking (known as Commercial Banking until a rebranding in January 2016). Retail Banking covers retail and direct-banking services for individuals and SMEs in Europe, Asia and Canada. Wholesale Banking provided banking services such as lending, payments and cash management to companies, governments and financial institutions in more than 40 countries.

ING's insurance and asset management activities consisted of life insurance, non-life insurance, pension and investment activities. These activities were split into two further units, one for US operations and one for European operations, each to be listed separately on the stock exchange.

=== NN Group ===
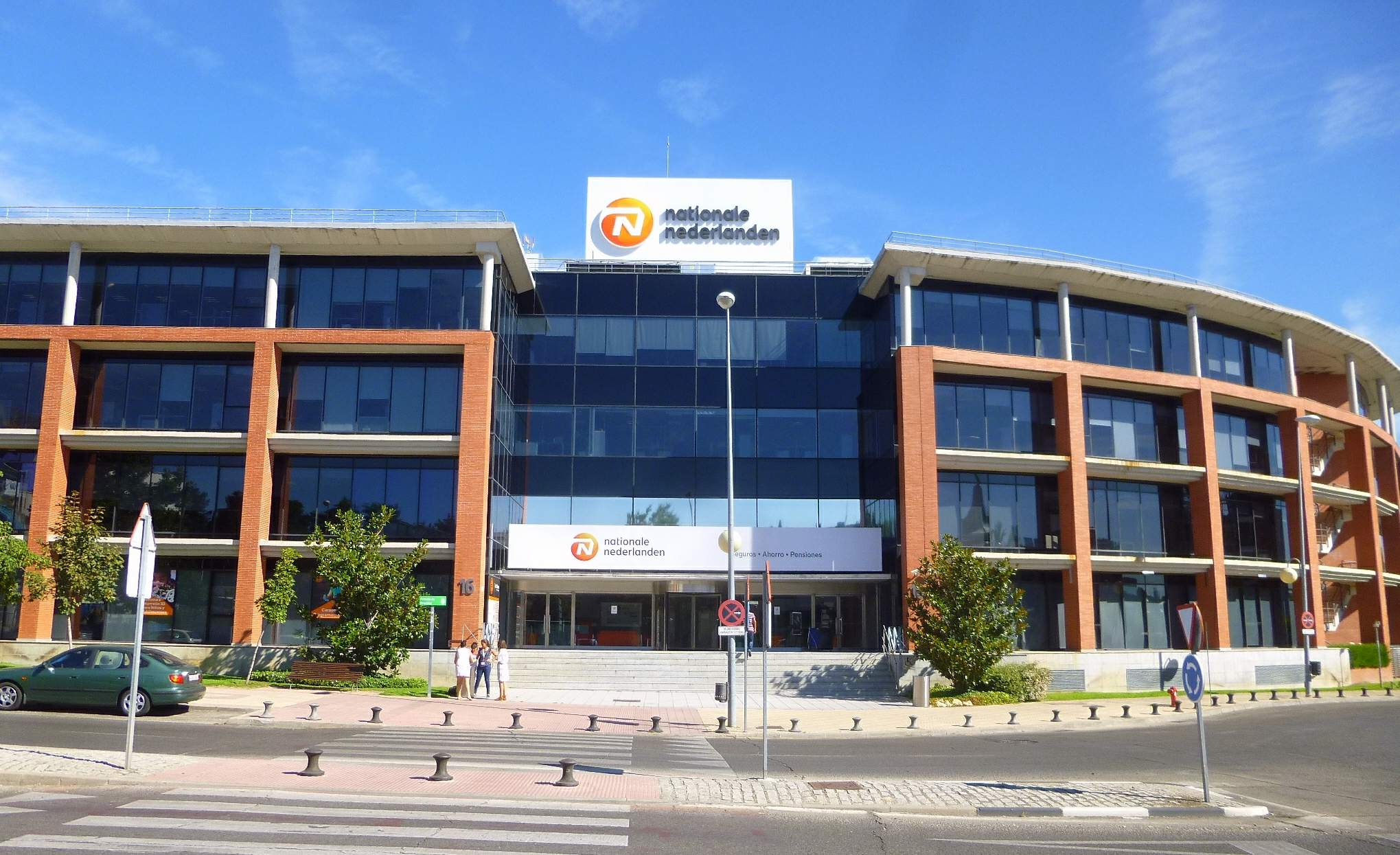
Nationale Nederlanden offices at the La Moraleja district in Madrid

Since late 2009, ING weighed how to divest its insurance arm, the NN Group — then estimated to be worth €12–16 billion — under the EU-mandated restructuring. In April 2014, investment companies from Hong Kong and Singapore had already subscribed for €1.3 billion. In May 2014, ING announced that it would bring NN Group to the stock exchange, priced at €20 per share — valuing NN Group on 1 July 2014 at €7 billion. The offering of 77 million shares raised €1.5 billion, and ING retained a stake of 71.4% in NN Group. ING also consolidated its investment management business which was floated and rebranded as NN Investment Partners.

At the time, NN Group employed over 12,000 people in 18 countries and had €168 billion in assets under management. In May 2015, ING's remaining stake in NN Group stood at 42.4%, at which point the European Commission's restrictions on ING regarding matters such as acquisitions and price leadership lapsed.

In April 2016, ING sold its remaining 14% stake in NN Group for €1.4 billion. This marked the final step in ING's five-year restructuring process, after which ING remained a pure banking company. NN Investment Partners was later sold by NN Group — by then fully independent of ING — to Goldman Sachs for €1.7 billion, in a deal completed in April 2022. With its main component Nationale-Nederlanden, the NN Group is active – besides the Netherlands – in Belgium, the Czech Republic, Greece, Hungary, Poland, Romania, Slovakia, Spain, and Japan. Following the 2014 split, ING continued for ten years as a distributor of Nationale-Nederlanden insurance policies for small and medium-sized businesses. From 2024, ING offered business-insurance (motor, contents, legal-expenses, disability) developed with Allianz.

=== Sale of non-core activities ===
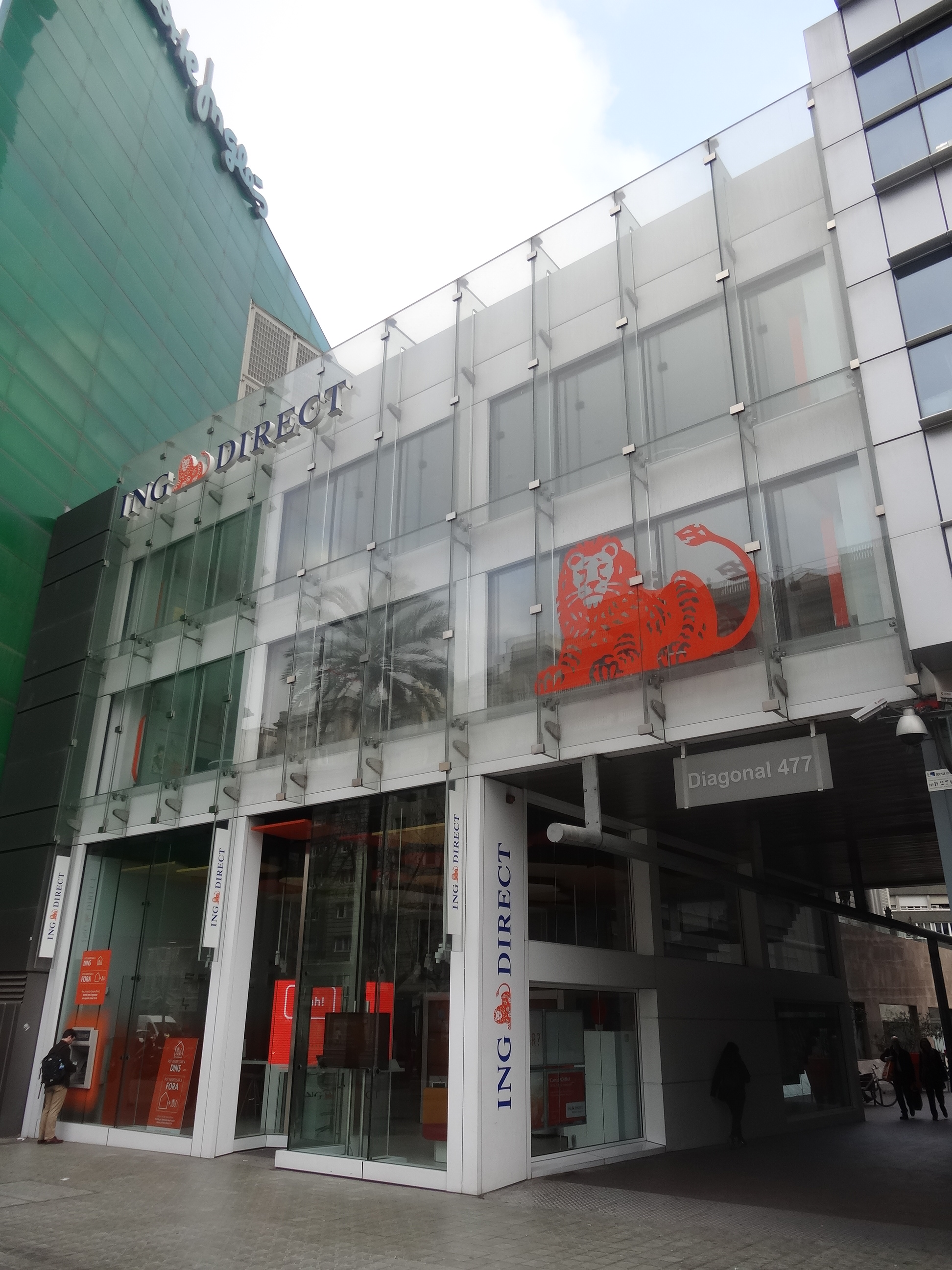
In core European markets, including Spain, after the 2008 crisis, ING kept its ING Direct banks (a branch on Avinguda Diagonal in Barcelona, pictured in 2017) before continuing to operate as ING

From 2009 onward, business units that did not fit the new group structure were divested. The proceeds were used to strengthen ING's capital position and to repay state aid. In 2010, ING's Private Banking activities in Asia were sold for €985 million, generating a sale profit of €332 million. The sale of ING's Swiss private-banking unit — which managed €10 billion in client assets — to Julius Baer Group for CHF 520 million ($505 million) closed in the first quarter of 2010, generating a profit of €120 million for ING. In the same period, ING sold its 51% stake in an Australian life-insurance and wealth-management joint venture to ANZ for €1.1 billion.

In August 2010, ING announced the sale of a 50% stake in a portfolio of Canadian industrial real estate. The sale was completed in November 2010 at €1.4 billion including assumed liabilities. At the same time, ING evaluated the potential sale of ING Real Estate Investment Management, then the world's largest real-estate fund manager by assets with €66.4 billion under management; the process required EU state-aid conditions. In February 2011, ING sold the majority of ING Real Estate Investment Management to CB Richard Ellis (CBRE) for $940 million, adding $59.8 billion in assets under management to CBRE's investment platform.

By the end of 2010, ING Group had 107,000 employees, more than 18,000 fewer than at the end of 2008.

In 2011, ING sold ING Car Lease to BMW. The transaction generated proceeds of €696 million, of which half was profit. In 2011, ING completed the sale of its Latin American life insurance and asset management activities to Grupo Sura (see § Latin American divestment). By the end of 2011, ING Group's workforce had further declined by 10,000 to around 97,000 employees.

In February 2012, ING Direct US was sold to the American bank holding Capital One (as announced in 2011). The sale price was €7 billion, part of which was paid in Capital One shares. ING subsequently held a 9.7% stake in Capital One. This transaction resulted in a profit of €0.5 billion for ING.

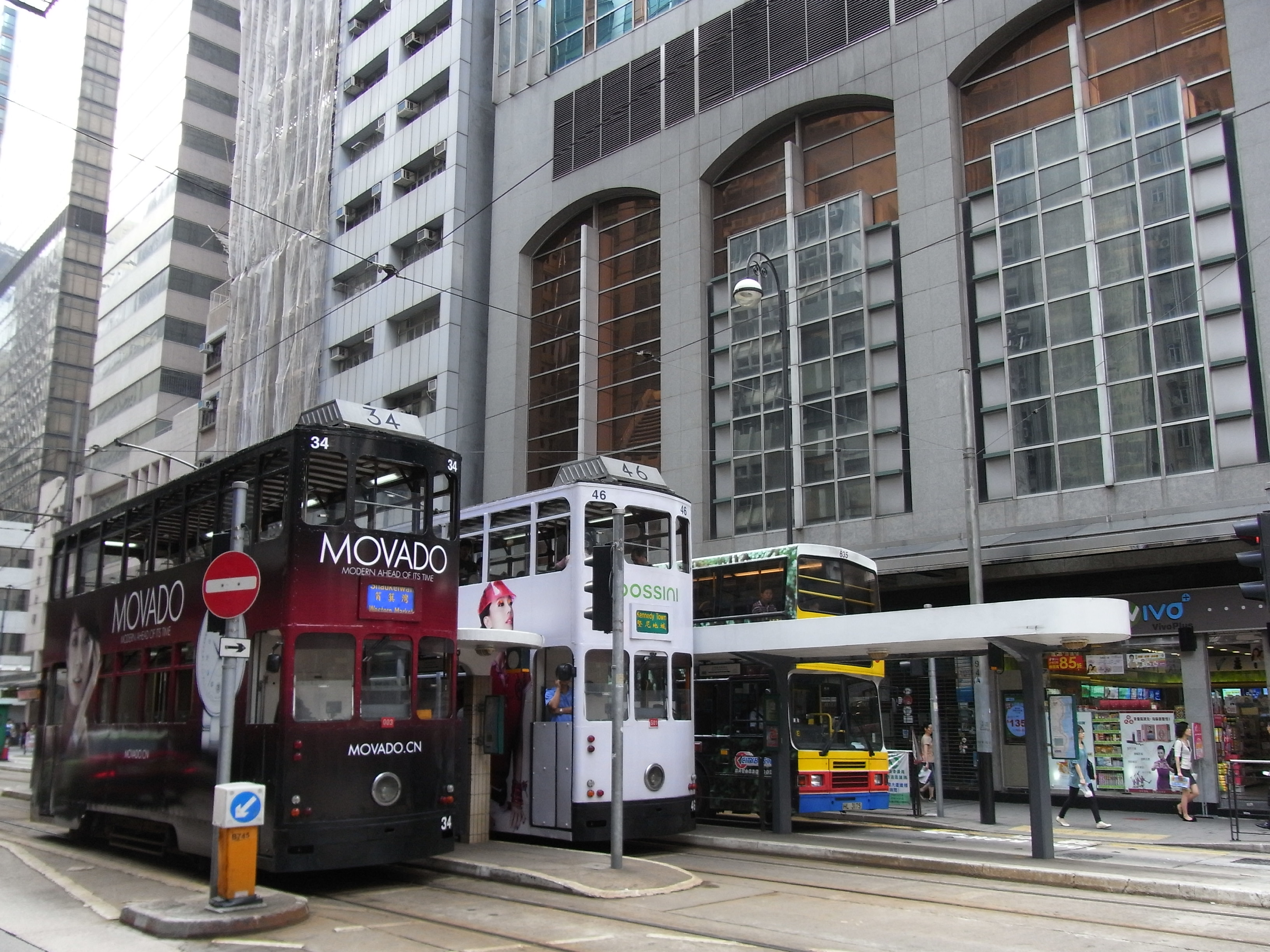
The ING Tower at the Des Voeux Road in Hong Kong's area Sheung Wan, in 2012

In December 2012, ING completed the sale of its insurance business in Malaysia to AIA Group. The sale proceeds were €1.3 billion, resulting in a profit of €750 million. This sale was part of ING's plans to divest its Asian insurance and asset management activities. In February 2013, ING sold its life insurance operations in Hong Kong, Macau and Thailand. ING achieved a net book profit of €950 million on the sale. The transaction with the Pacific Century Group, which paid a total of €1.64 billion, had already been announced in October 2012.

In August 2013, ING announced the sale of its life insurance business in South Korea to the investment firm MBK Partners. ING retained an indirect stake of 10% in ING Life Korea and received €1.24 billion. ING recorded a loss of €950 million on the sale. The transaction was completed in December 2013. With this sale, ING had divested the bulk of its Asian insurance activities slated for near-term sale. Its remaining Japanese life insurance business, ING Life Japan, proved unsuitable for a standalone sale and was instead folded into the European insurance divestment timeline (see § NN Group).

=== Adjustments to the restructuring ===
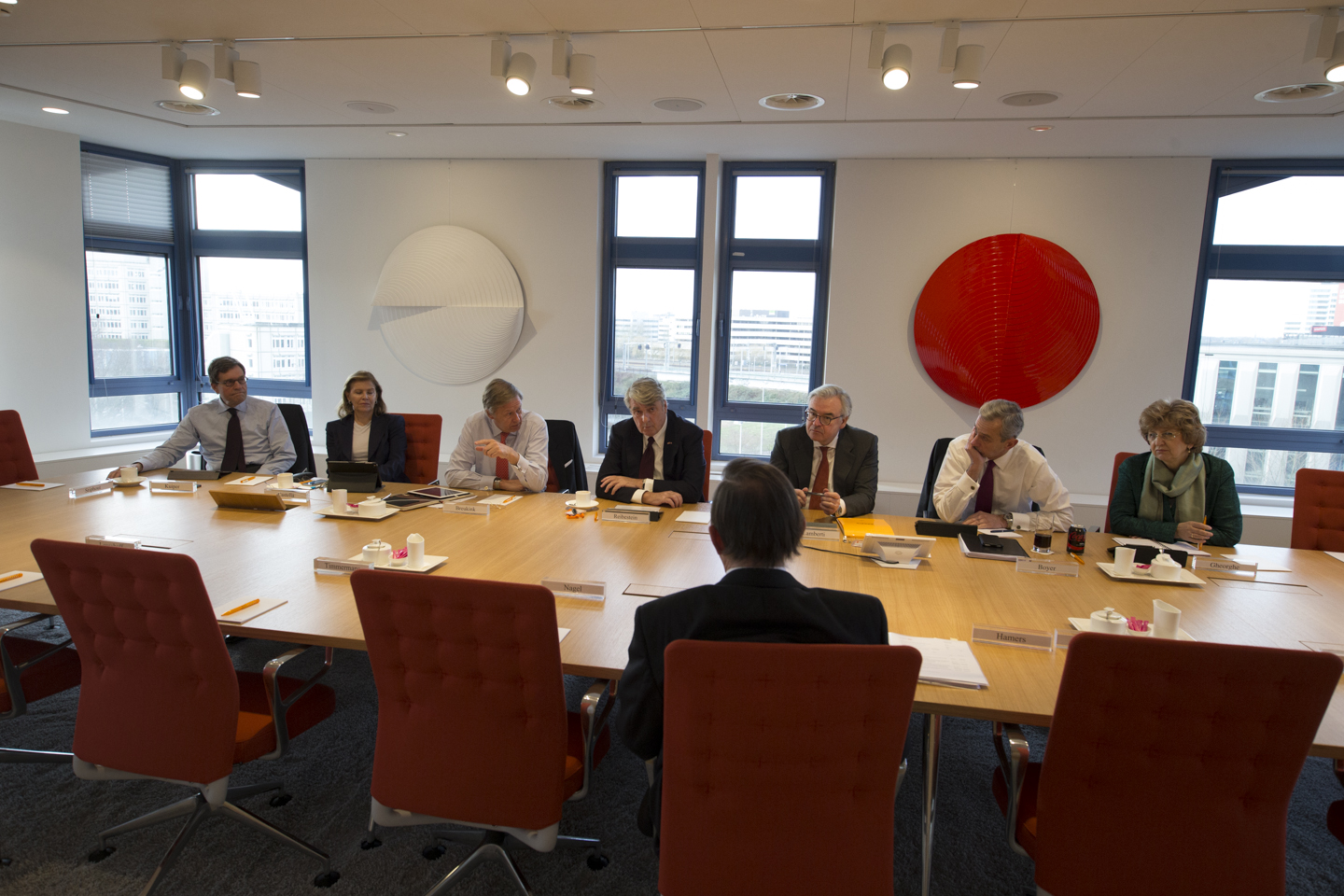
Meeting of the ING Group's board of directors, February 2016

ING found it difficult to complete the restructuring plans to have sold its insurance and asset management activities by the end of 2013. In November 2012, ING reached an agreement with the European Commission giving ING more time and flexibility to complete the divestments. The deadline was extended to the end of 2016 or 2018, depending on the region in which the activities were located.

Negotiations for the sale of the Dutch consumer bank Westland Utrecht Bank did not lead to a result. Its commercial activities were incorporated into the retail banking arm of Nationale-Nederlanden, while the mortgage portfolio largely remained with ING Bank. Finally, ING submitted a schedule for the repayment of the remaining €3 billion in state aid plus a 50% premium (€1.5 billion), in four equal instalments between 2012 and 2015.

== Recent transactions and financial developments ==
=== Latin American divestment ===
In July 2011, ING sold all its Latin American insurance operations to the Colombian insurance company Grupo Sura for US$2.6 billion (generating a profit for ING of €1 billion). The unit, then serving 10 million clients with $70 billion under management, brought Grupo Sura's combined client base to 25 million and its assets under management to $120 billion, excluding ING's 36 percent holding in Brazilian insurer SulAmérica Seguros, which was sold later. The actions were in line with EU demands to split the Group's banking and insurance operations as a condition of Dutch state aid. In 2013, ING reduced its stake in SulAmérica Seguros by 7.2%.

=== Other notable transactions ===
External videos
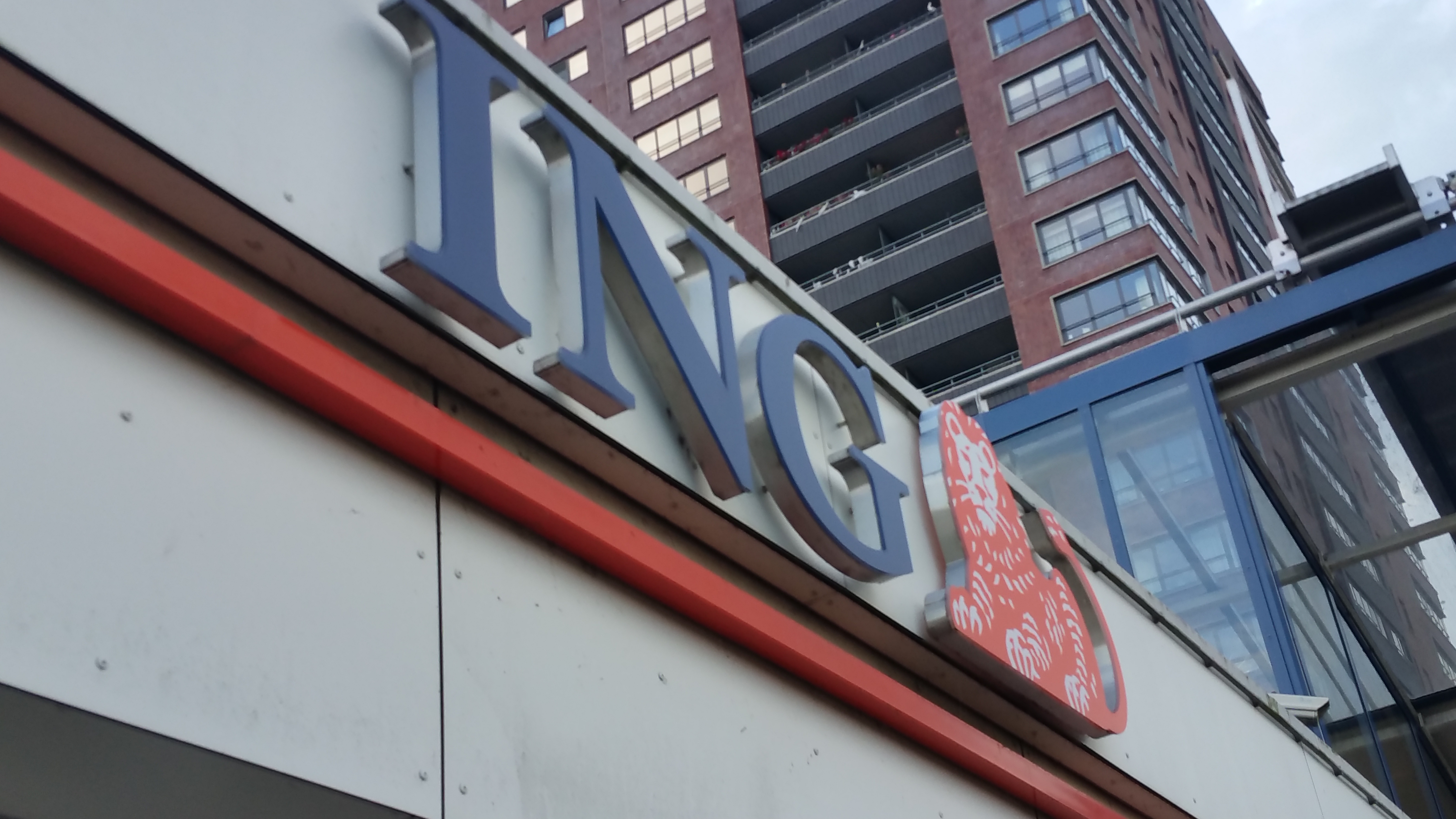
- Branch of ING Bank in Ommoord, Rotterdam
- How did we become the ING of today
- The History of ING Bank
- Our story in a nutshell
- Europe’s Recession Risk: ING CEO on what comes next and why it matters now

In October 2002, ING's U.S. real-estate investment-management unit Clarion Partners acquired Crow Holdings Industrial Trust, a portfolio of 300 warehouses affiliated with the family of developer Trammell Crow, for US$680 million plus the assumption of US$820 million in debt, forming a new unit Lion Industrial Trust. (In 2011, ING sold Clarion Partners to its own management for $100 million.)

In 2004, ING sold CenE Bankiers, a subsidiary inherited from NMB, to F. Van Lanschot Bankiers. The following year, ING acquired a 19.9% stake in the Bank of Beijing for ¥1.7 billion ($200 million). In January 2013, ING divested its 26% stake in India's Vysya Life Insurance to joint partner Exide Industries.

In March 2018, ING and Credit Suisse completed the first live securities lending transaction using an application built by HQLAx on the distributed-ledger platform Corda, worth €25 million.

In July 2025, ING Group finalized the acquisition of a 17.6% stake in private bank Van Lanschot Kempen, bringing its total holding to 20.3%. The stake was bought from an investment vehicle Reggeborgh Groep linked to the heirs of construction magnate Dik Wessels, for €350 million, in an abrupt deal.

In October 2025, ING launched a share buyback program of up to €1.1 billion accompanied by a €0.5 billion cash payment. This followed two earlier buyback programs: €1.5 billion (November 2022), and €2.5 billion (May 2024). In December 2025, ING introduced instant EUR incoming payments without fees for retail and business customers.

In April 2026, ING was named as one of 21 underwriting banks — led by Bank of America, Citigroup, Goldman Sachs, JPMorgan Chase, and Morgan Stanley — on SpaceX's initial public offering, which targeted a valuation of around $2 trillion and up to $75 billion raised, positioned to become the largest IPO on record, surpassing Saudi Aramco's 2019 listing. ING was allocated 2.3 million of the 555,555,555 shares placed with underwriters at the $135-per-share IPO price, corresponding to $2.1 million in underwriting commission.

In July 2026, ING acquired a 40% stake in Spanish wealth manager Singular Bank, which has around €20 billion of assets under management. The stake was acquired from investment firm Warburg Pincus, which had held 93%. Earlier in 2026, ING's Polish subsidiary, ING Bank Śląski, separately acquired Goldman Sachs' local wealth-management operations in Poland.

==== Fintech investments ====
In January 2016, ING's banking unit invested in the Chinese mobile-lending platform WeLab. In early 2018, ING acquired a 75% controlling stake in the Dutch payments company Payvision for €380 million.

Intended to compete with Adyen, Payvision came to include high-risk clients that drew money-laundering scrutiny. ING wrote off hundreds of millions of euros on the investment within a year of the purchase. In early 2022, ING wound down Payvision at a cost of 162 jobs, and write-offs of €400 million by the end of 2023. In April 2024, the Dutch Public Prosecution Service fined Payvision's founders for violations of the anti-money-laundering law between 2016 and 2020.

In 2017, ING launched Yolt, a UK-based open-banking personal-finance app that let users aggregate accounts and track spending, reaching over 1.5 million registered users. ING closed the consumer app in 2022 to focus on its business-to-business platform, before deciding to wind down that operation as well. In 2023, it was acquired by Tarabut Gateway.

In late 2017, ING launched Katana, an artificial-intelligence tool bond-trading that used data from hundreds of thousands of past trades to help bond traders decide what price to quote clients. A trial cut trading costs by 25% and led to faster pricing on 90% of trades. ING extended the tool to buy-side asset managers, developed with Dutch pension fund manager PGGM, before spinning off the technology in 2020 as a London-based fintech.

ING sold another of its fintech holdings, the multi-bank connectivity platform Cobase, to Alpha Group International in September 2023, for €9.4 million.

In 2024, ING worked with McKinsey & Company to build a generative-AI customer-service chatbot; it came to handle about 200 of the bank's 5,000 daily customer inquiries, with human review of its conversations to guard against harmful or inaccurate output.

== Global operations ==
ING Group global locations as of 2026
- Wholesale Banking & Retail Banking
- Wholesale Banking
- ING pursuing an exit from the Russian market

ING Group conducts its banking activities, employing over 60,000 people worldwide, through two globally organized business lines — Retail Banking, which serves individual and small-business customers, and Wholesale Banking, which serves large corporates, financial institutions and governments — each led by its own head within ING's senior management.

=== Retail Banking ===
This division serves individual and small-business customers and, as of 2026, is offered in ten markets with a combined customer base of 41 million: Australia, Belgium, Germany, Italy, Luxembourg, the Netherlands, Poland, Romania, Spain, and Turkey.

Business banking for small and medium-sized enterprises is offered in nine of these ten (all except Spain), while private banking and wealth management services are offered separately in the Netherlands, Belgium, Luxembourg, and Poland. Private banking and wealth management services are offered in a narrower set of four markets: the Netherlands, Belgium, Luxembourg, and Poland. Depending on the country, retail banking is delivered either through separately incorporated local subsidiary (e.g., ING Belgium, ING-DiBa in Germany, or ING Bank Śląski in Poland) or through a direct branch of the parent company, ING Bank N.V., without separate incorporation (for example in Spain, Italy, and Romania).

=== Wholesale Banking ===
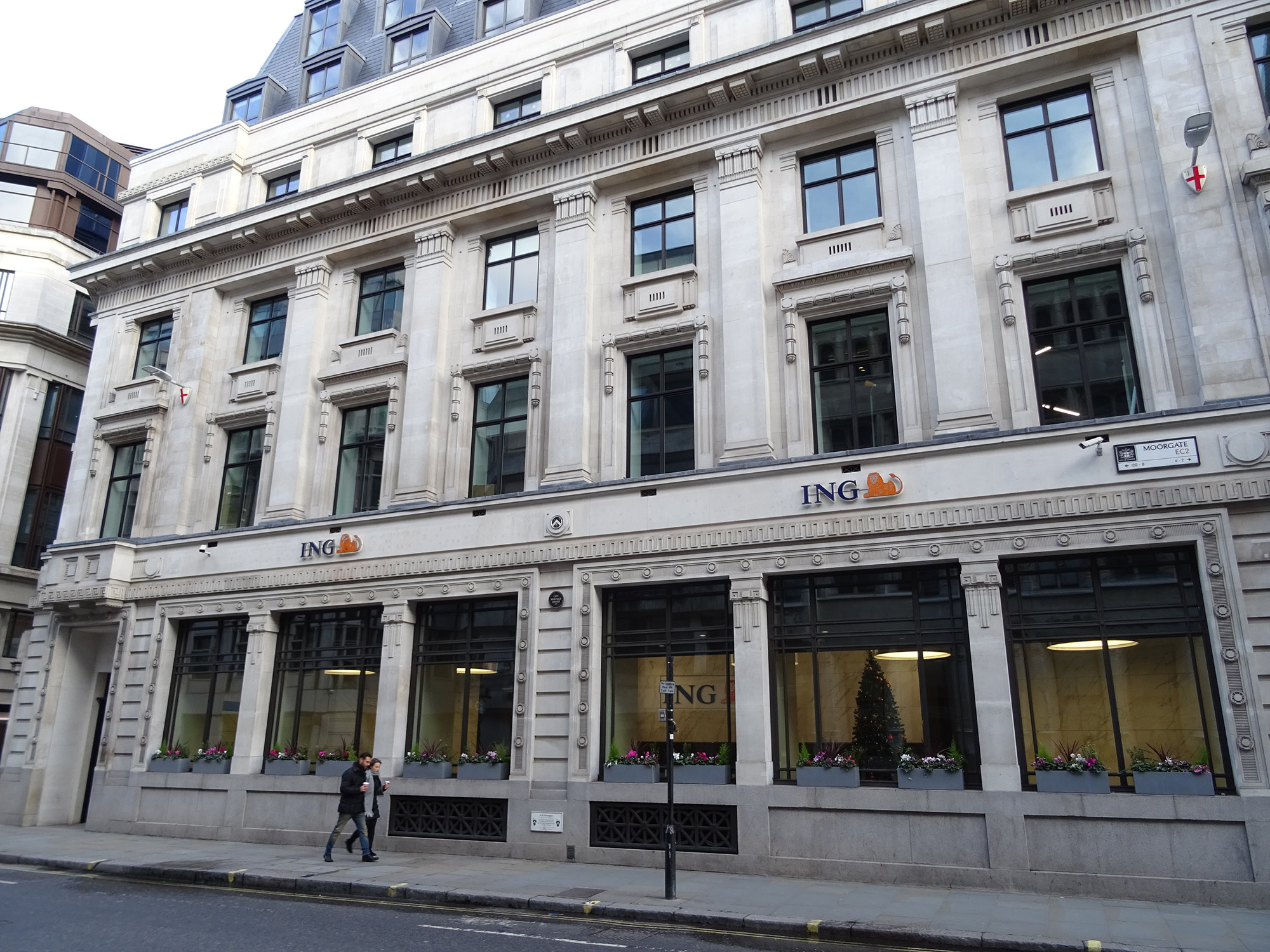
ING Wholesale Banking offices at Moorgate, in the City of London

This division serves large corporates, financial institutions and governments, and maintains a considerably broader footprint than Retail Banking: as of the 2024 financial year, it operated from 36 countries across three regions — Europe, the Middle East and Africa (EMEA), Asia-Pacific, and the Americas — with EMEA the largest of the three. Because Wholesale Banking clients frequently operate across national borders, more than half of the division's income (58% in 2024) was generated from cross-border business — meaning ING serves corporate clients active in considerably more than the 36 countries where it maintains a physical presence, which underlies the company's broader claim of activity in "more than 100 countries." Within Europe, ING describes its network as a gateway through which American and Asian multinational clients access banking services in the region.

Until 2022, Wholesale Banking also included Russia, operated through the subsidiary ING Bank (Eurasia). Following Russia's full-scale invasion of Ukraine, ING stopped taking on new Russian clients and has been winding down its Russian operations since February 2022. A planned sale of ING Bank (Eurasia) to Global Development JSC, announced in January 2025, was terminated in April 2026 after the buyer failed to obtain the required regulatory approvals. ING has stated it continues to pursue an exit from the Russian market (see § Russia operations and Ukraine sanctions).

== Corporate governance ==
=== Legal structure ===
ING Groep N.V. is the parent holding company of the group. All banking activities are carried out through its wholly owned subsidiary ING Bank N.V. The Executive Board of ING Groep N.V. has three members (CEO, CFO, and CRO), all of whom also sit on the seven-member Management Board Banking of ING Bank N.V., which additionally includes the COO, CTO, and the heads of Retail Banking and Wholesale Banking. ING Bank N.V. holds a 75.00% stake in ING Bank Śląski S.A. (Poland).

=== Stichting Continuïteit ING ===
As a protection against hostile takeovers, ING Groep N.V. has established the Stichting Continuïteit ING (ING Continuity Foundation). The foundation holds a contractual option to acquire cumulative preference shares in ING Groep N.V., up to a maximum of one-third of the company's total issued share capital at the time of exercise. The foundation may activate this option when the continuity, independence or identity of ING Group is considered to be at risk, providing the Supervisory Board with time to deliberate on an appropriate response.

=== Principal shareholders ===
As of for fiscal year 2025, BlackRock was the only investor holding 5% or more of ING Groep N.V.'s issued share capital (7.3%, per a Schedule 13G disclosed in February 2024, still the most recent applicable disclosure). Dutch law requires investors to publicly disclose their holdings once they cross certain ownership levels, such as 3% or 5%. Based on these disclosures, ING has also identified Goldman Sachs Group, Norges Bank, Capital Research and Management Company, and ING Group N.V. itself (through its own share buybacks) as holders of at least 3% of the company's shares.

== National subsidiaries and brands ==
=== Belgium ===
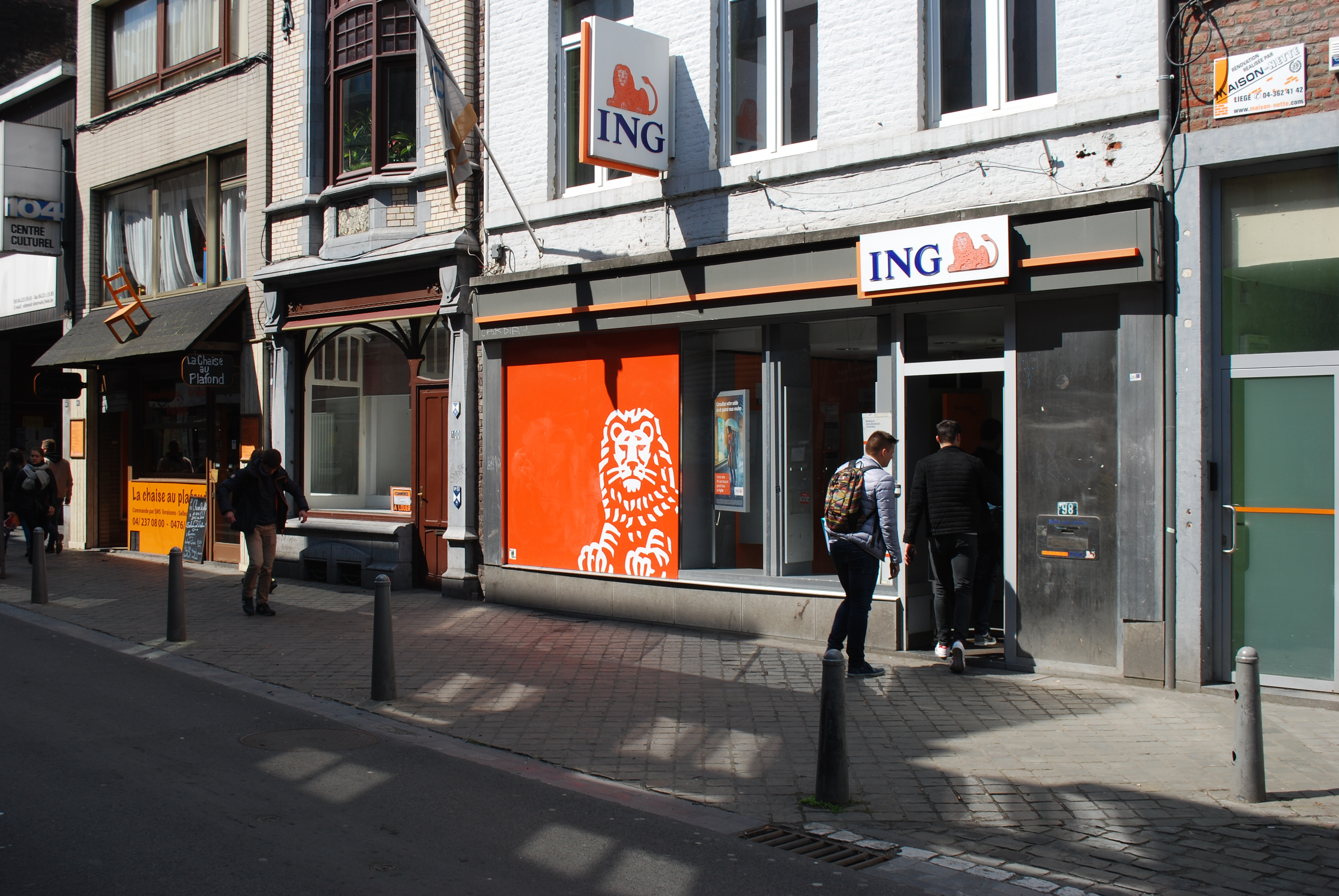
ING branch at the Rue Saint-Gilles in Liège, pictured in 2017

ING Belgium is the Belgian subsidiary of ING Group, formed from the 1998 rebranding of Bank Brussels Lambert (BBL) following ING's 1997 takeover of the bank (see § History). BBL itself had been created in 1975 from the merger of Bank of Brussels and Banque Lambert, and was formally rebranded ING Belgium in 2003. It provides retail and commercial banking services to individuals and businesses in Belgium, together with related financial products such as insurance and asset management.

For the 2025 financial year, ING Belgium reported a pre-tax profit of €865 million, down from €1.2 billion in 2024, a decline attributed to lower interest income from its Luxembourg operations (where mass-market retail activities are being scaled back in favor of Private Banking & Wealth Management), higher bank levies, and increased risk costs in the international part of its Wholesale Banking activities.

=== Poland ===
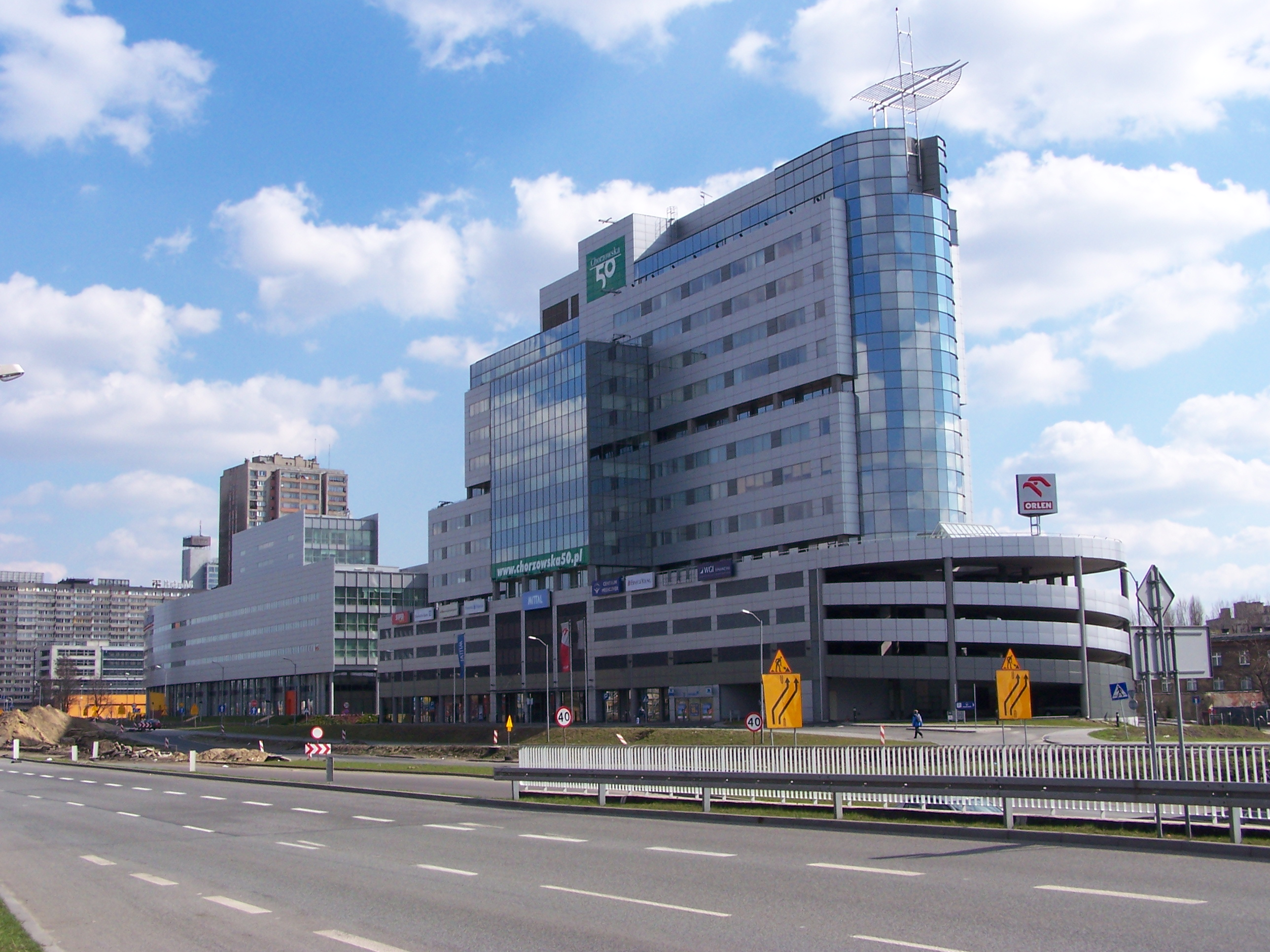
Headquarters of the ING Bank Śląski on Chorzowska Street in Katowice

In 1996, the Group became a majority shareholder of Poland's Bank Śląski ("Bank of Silesia"), one of nine banks spun off in the late 1980s from the National Bank of Poland, which ended the country's single-tier banking system. ING had first invested in Bank Śląski in 1994, acquiring a 25.9% stake from the Polish government for US$57 million — marking it as Central Europe's first large bank to receive a private foreign investor — before increasing its stake to 54% in June 1996.

In 2001, Bank Śląski merged with an ING Bank branch in Warsaw, and since then the bank operates as ING Bank Śląski. It is listed on the Warsaw Stock Exchange, and headquartered in Katowice. As of 2024, it was the fifth-largest bank in Poland by total assets (PLN 260.36 billion, 7.75% market share), reporting net income of PLN 4,369 million and a return on equity of 25.86%. In 2025, it reported a record net profit of PLN 4.6 billion (up 6%), grew its retail customer base to 4.7 million and its business clients to 554,000, overtaking Santander to become the third-largest Polish bank by loans and deposits.

=== Australia ===
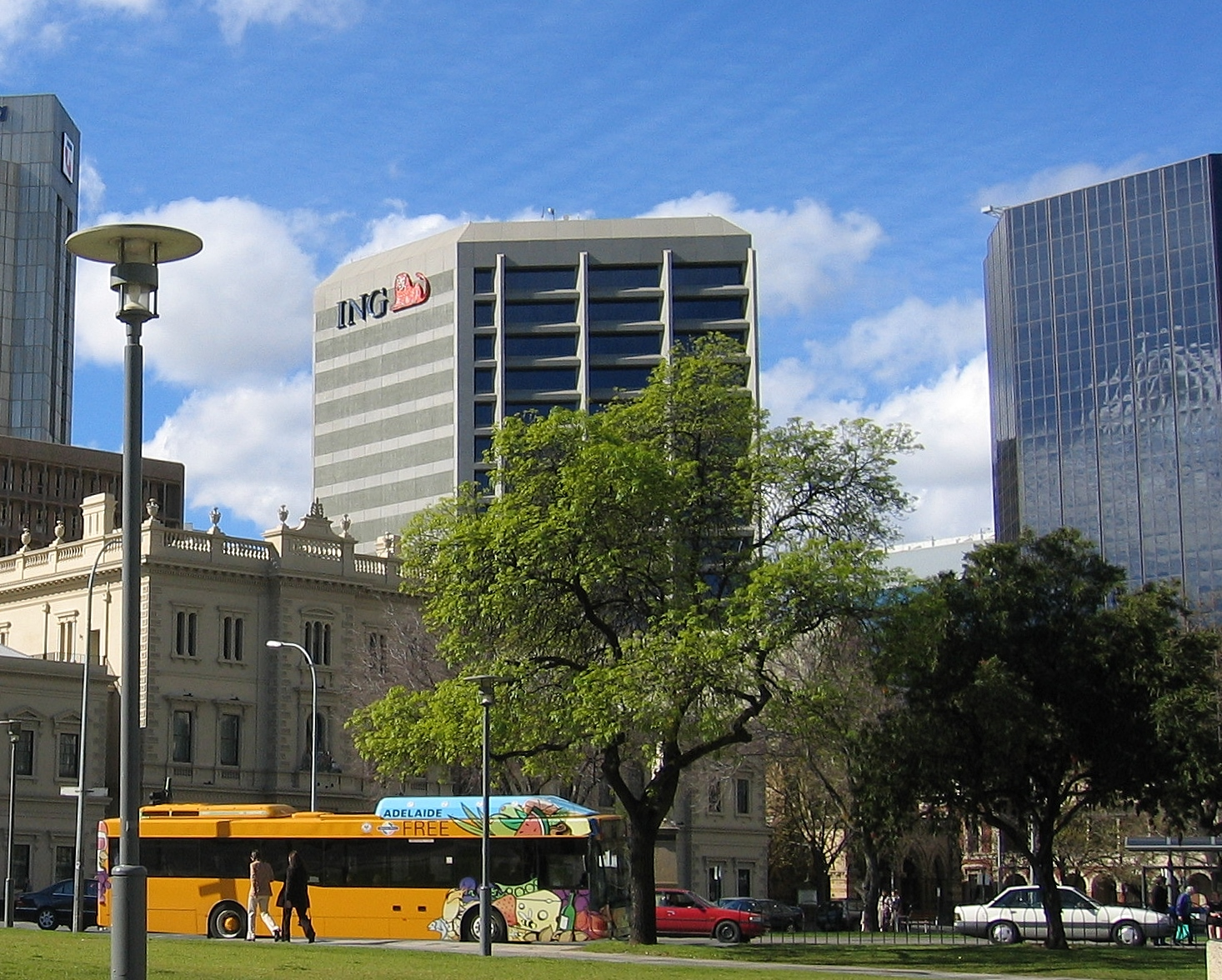
ING Australian offices in Adelaide

ING in Australia was established in 1999 and is headquartered in Sydney. Its products in Australia include transaction accounts, savings accounts, credit cards, business accounts, term deposits, home loans and superannuation. Company operations are regulated by the Australian Prudential Regulation Authority and the Australian Securities and Investments Commission, Federal Government regulators. ING is a division of ING Bank (Australia) Limited.

For the 2025 financial year, ING Australia reported a net profit of A$591 million, up 11% year-on-year, on operating income of A$1.705 billion. Its total loan book grew 12% to A$86.4 billion, including A$72.3 billion in residential mortgages, while retail deposits rose 5% to A$55.8 billion across 2.33 million active customers.

=== Germany ===
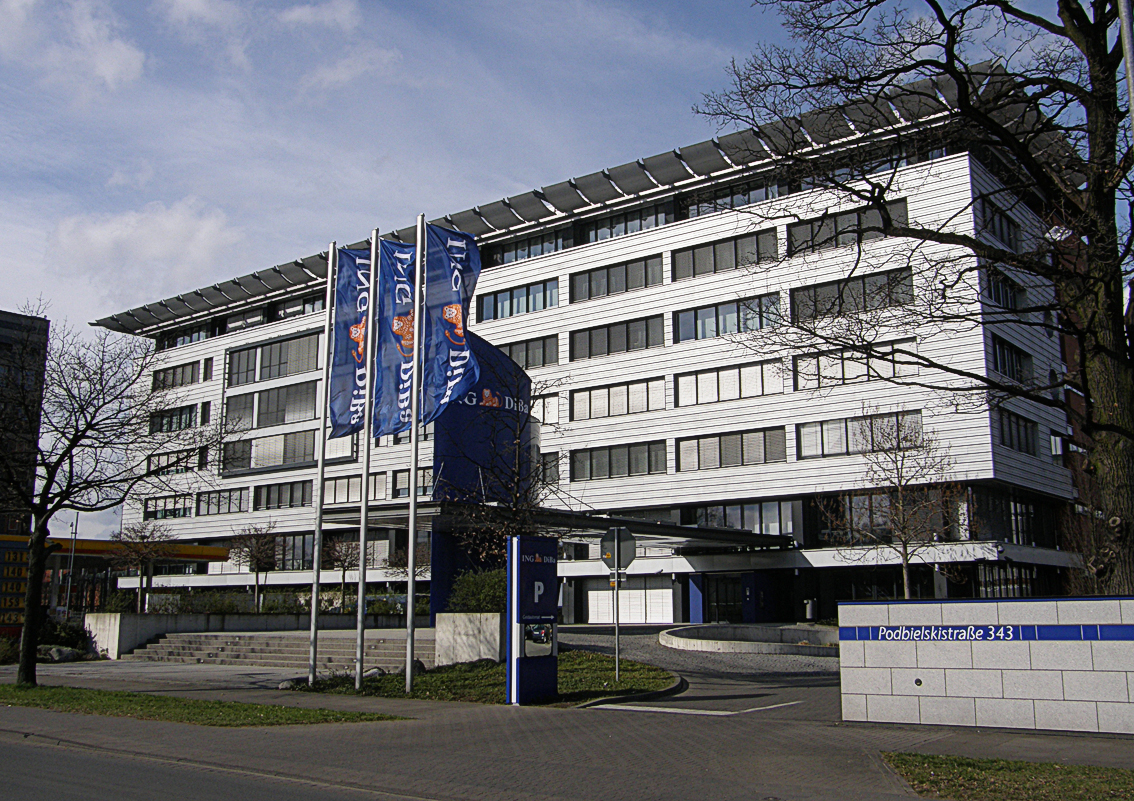
ING-DiBa offices at the Vahrenwald-List in Hanover, in 2008

ING in Germany, formerly ING-DiBa is Germany's third biggest bank by number of customers, serving over 10 million customers. Operating with a limited physical branch presence, the bank reported a pre-tax profit of €2.119 billion for 2024 — the second-best result in its 60-year history — on customer deposits of €150.2 billion and around 5,000 employees, based mainly in Frankfurt with additional offices in Berlin, Hanover and Nuremberg. ING bought 49% of Allgemeine Deutsche Direktbank AG in 1998, which as of 1989 traded as DiBa. It acquired a further stake to reach 70% in February 2002 and the remaining share by 2003. By 2007, the company was trading under the name ING-DiBa. In November 2018, the bank changed its brand name to ING.

=== Italy ===
Founded in 2001, ING in Italy had grown to 1.34 million customers by the end of 2025, supported by a network of financial advisors and agents rather than physical branches. In 2025, the bank launched a Business Banking segment in Italy — its seventh national market for that product, after the Netherlands, Belgium, Poland, Romania, Turkey, and Germany — aimed at freelancers and sole proprietors.

=== Minority stakes in other banks ===
ING holds a 13% stake in the Bank of Beijing, the largest urban commercial bank in China, following an initial 19.9% investment in 2005 that was subsequently diluted through the bank's capital increases.

In Thailand, ING holds a stake in TMBThanachart Bank (TTB) — formed from the 2021 merger of TMB Bank, in which ING first invested, with Thanachart Bank. ING reduced its stake from 23.1% to 19.5% in June 2026 through participation in TTB's share buyback program, generating proceeds of €243 million.

== Products and services ==
Beyond its organizational divisions, ING Group offers a range of retail and wholesale banking products across its markets, spanning everyday banking, mortgages, sustainable and responsible investment services, and corporate and transaction banking.

=== Retail and direct banking ===
Along with their core savings, payments and mortgage products, on several retail markets ING introduced distinctive offerings in recent years:

- In mid-2020s, ING added a tiered subscription banking model on four plans in Belgium, Poland, Romania, and by June 2026, the Netherlands — bundling everyday banking with cards, investment and insurance benefits, and partner extras including travel protection and a Disney+ subscription. ING said it intended to extend the model across all nine of its retail markets, covering 41 million customers, by mid-2027. ING's strategy was intended to diversify income toward fee and commission income, and to defend market share against digital-only neobanks such as Revolut. The change drew consumer and expert criticism, and comparison to "big tech" models. Consumentenbond had reported that ING's basic-account annual fee rose 135% between 2019 and 2024 — the steepest increase among Dutch banks.
- In mid-2026, ING introduced an agentic AI assistant to help assess mortgage applications that fall outside standard policy criteria — reportedly about 80% of the applications it receives — with an ING employee retaining responsibility for the final decision in every case.

=== Retail ESG products ===
- ING introduced green retail lending in some markets, including Australia, launched from late 2024 at a fixed rate of 3.74% with support from the Australian government's Clean Energy Finance Corporation, allowing eligible home-loan customers to borrow additional funds for energy-efficient upgrades such as solar panels, batteries and heat pumps.
- ING offers sustainable investing services to retail customers in the Netherlands, Belgium, Luxembourg, and Germany, including brokerage, financial advisory, and discretionary investment management. Since 2014 EU MiFID rules on ESG preferences took effect in August 2022, ING distinguishes four approaches to ESG integration ranging from portfolios applying only mandatory exclusions to portfolios that prioritize measurable sustainability outcomes over financial yield, using Sustainalytics data and screening funds reporting under Articles 8 and 9 of the EU Sustainable Finance Disclosure Regulation. ING's ESG investment products and advertising of thereof have drawn scrutiny over greenwashing in sustainability-labelled products.

=== Wholesale and corporate banking ===
- For its corporate clients across Central and Eastern European markets, ING uses a digital banking platform InsideBusiness. It combines a web portal and mobile app that link clients' enterprise-resource-planning and treasury-management systems to the bank. The combination gives a single point of access to payments and collections, cash management, trade finance, lending and financial markets. In 2024, ING migrated its European Payments infrastructure to an upgraded technology stack, a modernization Euromoney linked to gains in its transaction-services business.
- Since 2018, ING has offered corporate clients access to Komgo, a Blockchain-based trade-finance platform on the Ethereum network, it helped launch alongside a consortium of banks and commodity trading firms. The platform, now used by more than 200 banks and trading companies worldwide, allows clients to digitize trade-finance instruments including letters of credit and guarantees. ING completed its first commodity transaction on the platform in August 2019, financing an oil trade on behalf of Mercuria.
- ING Bank N.V. operates ING Global Markets Research, a research service for institutional and professional investors covering macroeconomic trends, foreign exchange market, interest rates, credit markets and commodities. The service, which forms part of the bank's Wholesale Banking sales and trading operations, distributes investment recommendations, and offers corporate access.

In 2025, Euromoney magazine ranked ING first among corporates and named Europe's best cash management bank, a top-tier provider of commodity and trade finance, and a leading provider of notional cash pooling.

== Former divisions ==
=== Canada ===
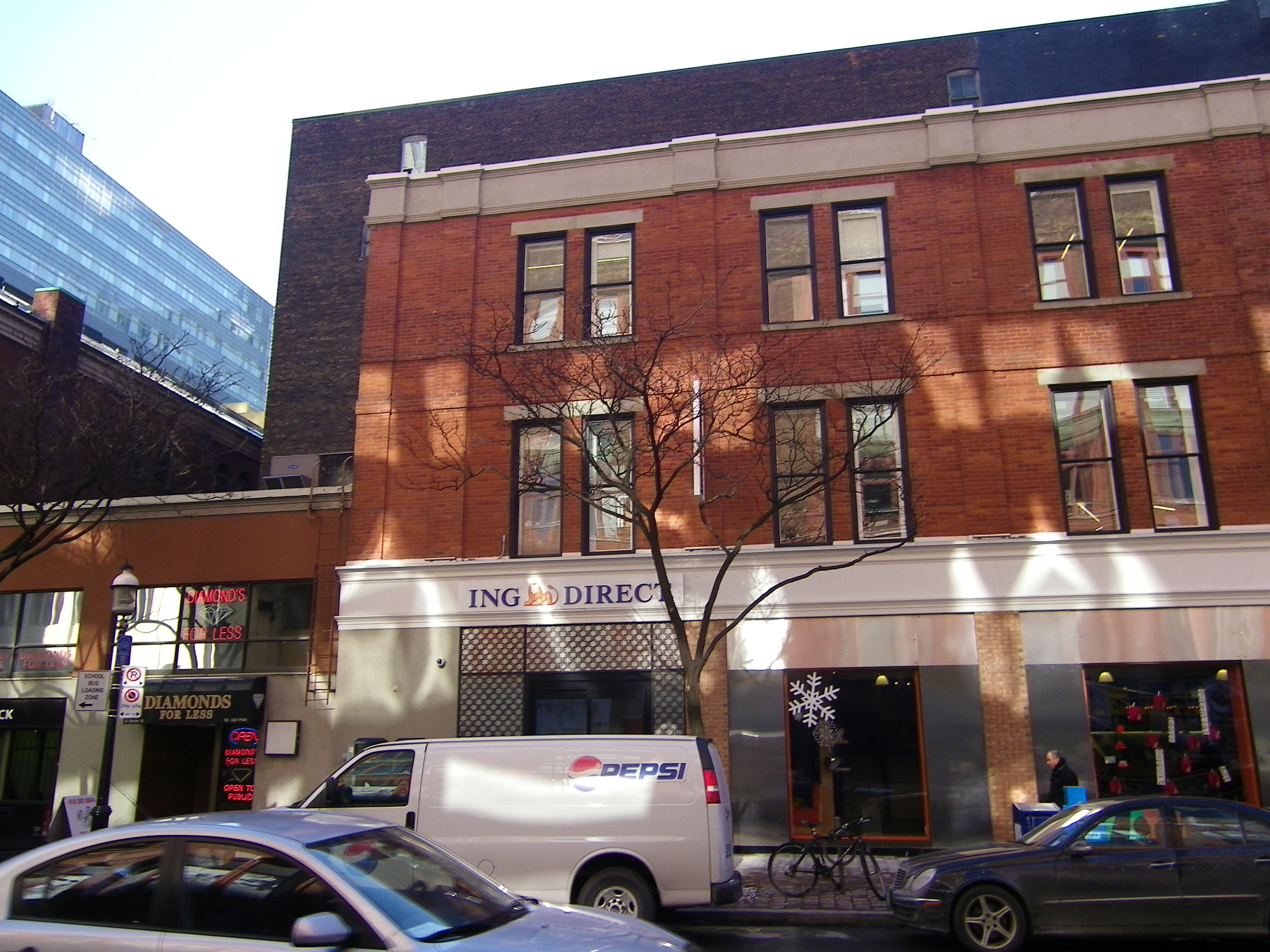
ING Direct office at Shuter street in Toronto, pictured in 2012

ING's history in Canada dates back to 1997 when it founded ING Direct Canada, the first ING Direct operation in the world. By July 2011, ING Direct Canada had over 1.7 million clients, employed over 900 people and had over US$37.6 billion in assets. With no physical branches, ING Direct Canada operated five cafés in Toronto, Montréal, Calgary, and Vancouver.

Its products included savings accounts, tax-free savings accounts, mortgages, retirement savings plans (RSPs), guaranteed investment certificates, mutual funds, business accounts and no-fee daily checking accounts. The bank was known for using a referral program as part of their advertising.

On 29 August 2012, Scotiabank announced the acquisition of ING Direct Canada for C$3.13 billion, generating a net after-tax gain of €1.1 billion for ING. At the time, ING Direct Canada had 1.8 million customers with C$40 billion in assets, C$30 billion in deposits and over 1,100 employees. The sale was completed on 15 November 2012. In November 2013, Scotiabank announced the rebranding of ING Direct Canada as Tangerine Bank with the rebranding taking effect on 8 April 2014.

=== France ===
Founded in 2000, ING Direct in France had around 1 million customers at peak. It started offering current accounts in 2009 and home loans in 2015. In 2019, the bank changed its name to ING.

In December 2021, ING announced it would exit retail banking in France, citing its inability to achieve the scale needed to remain profitable in the market. Under a definitive agreement signed with Boursorama,, a direct-banking subsidiary of Société Générale, on 4 April 2022, ING's current-account, savings, and life-insurance customers were transferred to Boursorama, while ING retained its mortgage and consumer-loan portfolio, as well as its wholesale and investment banking business in France. The transition drew criticism from consumer groups: according to reports, ING closed the accounts of customers who had not opted to transfer to Boursorama over the summer of 2022, in some cases giving a few days' notice, prompting the consumer association France Conso Banque to organize collective action.

=== United Kingdom ===
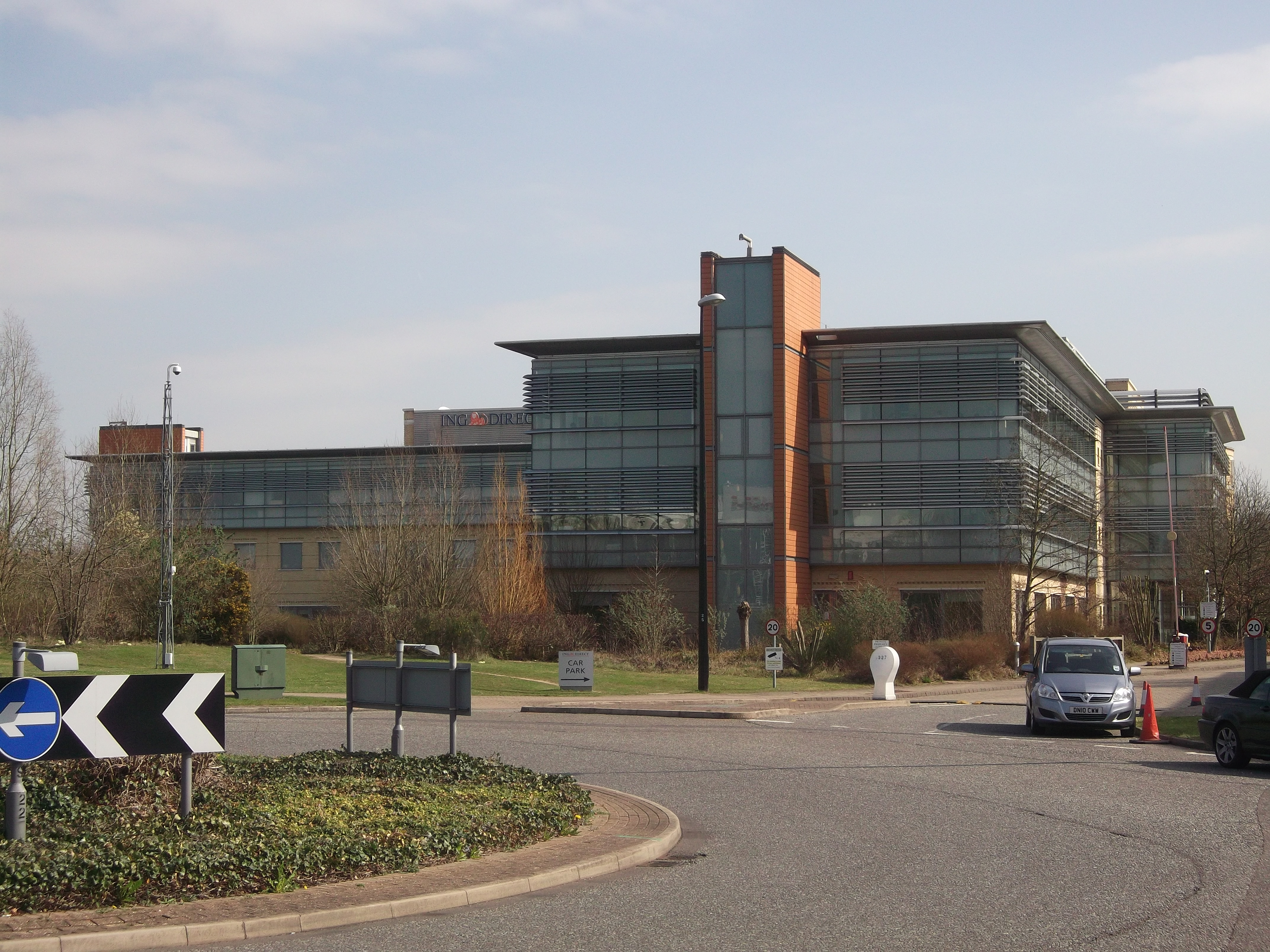
ING Direct UK offices in Reading, Berkshire, pictured in March 2012

ING Direct began operations in the UK in May 2003 and had over one million customers by 2009. Operations were based in Reading, where the company head office was situated as well as an office in Cardiff. The bank picked up awards for its customer service and mortgage product in 2008 and 2009.

On 8 October 2008, ING purchased the savings accounts of collapsed Icelandic bank, Kaupthing Singer & Friedlander. The UK Treasury used the Banking (Special Provisions) Act 2008 to transfer the Kaupthing Edge deposit business to ING Direct. Through this, ING Direct took over responsibility for £2.5 billion of deposits of 160,000 UK customers with the Icelandic bank Kaupthing Edge. ING Direct products in the UK included savings accounts, Cash ISAs, mortgages, and home insurance.

In August 2012, ING announced a plan to exit the UK, as it sought to raise funds to repay the Dutch government. In October 2012, Barclays announced that it had agreed to buy ING Direct UK, taking on its £10.9 billion deposits and £5.6 billion mortgage book, in a deal expected to involve the transfer of around 750 ING Direct staff and 1.5 million customers, with ING projecting an after-tax loss of €320 million. The deal closed in the second quarter of 2013; the final combined loss came to €260 million — lower than projected, as market conditions had improved for the investment portfolio.

=== United States ===
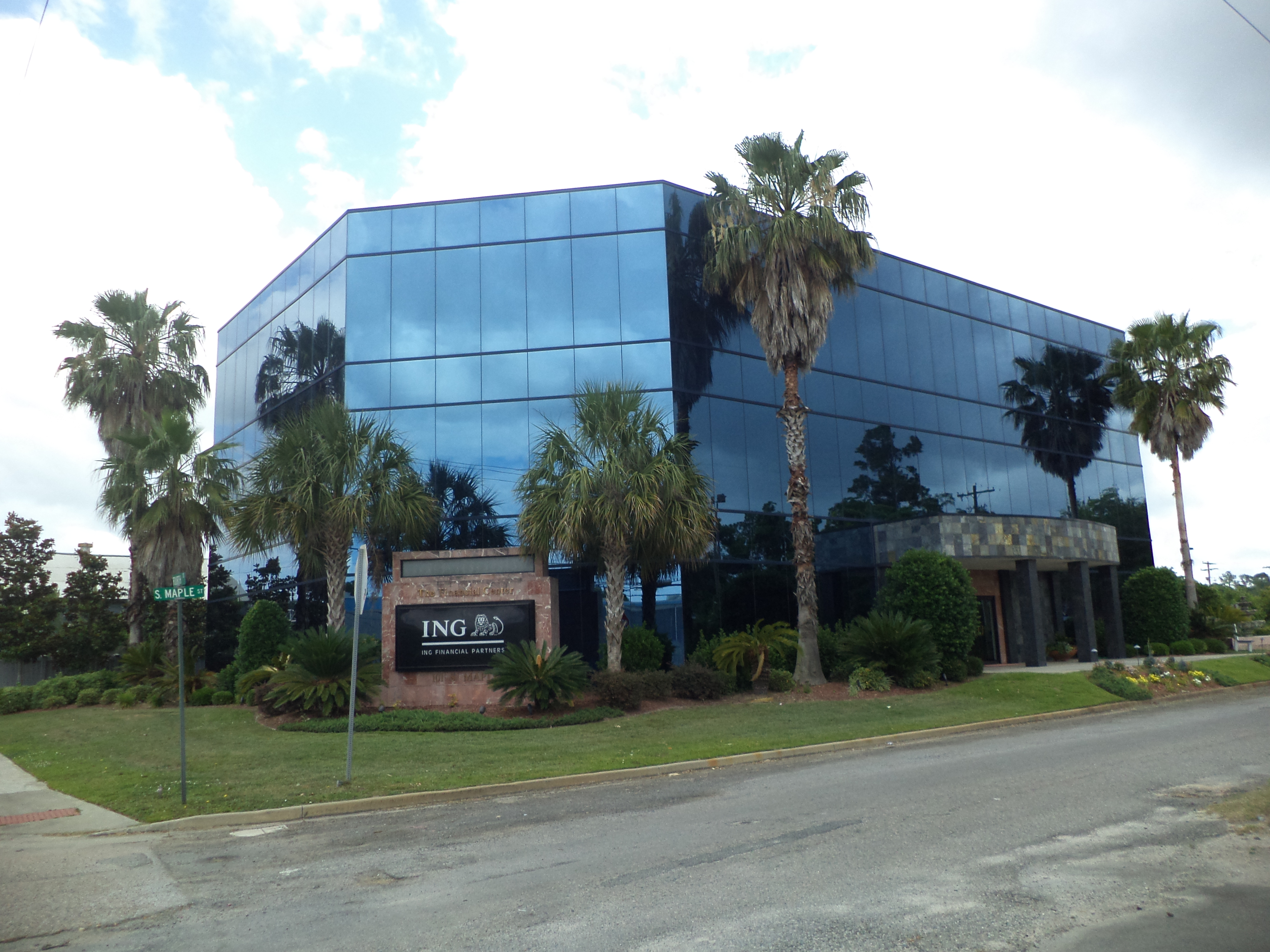
ING Building in Adel, Georgia, pictured in 2013

In 2000, ING launched a direct bank in the United States, with headquarters in Wilmington, Delaware. In September 2007, ING Direct acquired 104,000 customers and their FDIC-insured deposits from NetBank after it suffered from bank failure. Two months later, ING Direct acquired the financial company Sharebuilder.

Announced on 16 June 2011 in a stock-and-cash transaction valued at US$9 billion, the deal closed on 17 February 2012, when Capital One acquired ING Direct USA from ING for US$6.3 billion in cash and 54 million shares of Capital One. The Federal Reserve approved the transaction on 14 February 2012, days before the deal closed, in what was then the largest bank acquisition to win Fed approval since passage of the Dodd–Frank Act.

ING Direct USA, the largest direct bank in the United States, had attracted more than 7.6 million customers and nearly US$83 billion in deposits since 2000; the transaction made Capital One the sixth-largest US depository institution. As a result of the share component of the deal, ING held a 9.7% stake in Capital One following the transaction. In September 2012, ING sold its remaining 9% stake (54 million shares) in Capital One for $3 billion, generating a net profit of €300 million ($378 million) and lifting its core Tier 1 capital ratio to 11.9%. Between November 2012 and February 2013, ING Direct's U.S. operations were rebranded Capital One 360.

==== Voya Financial ====
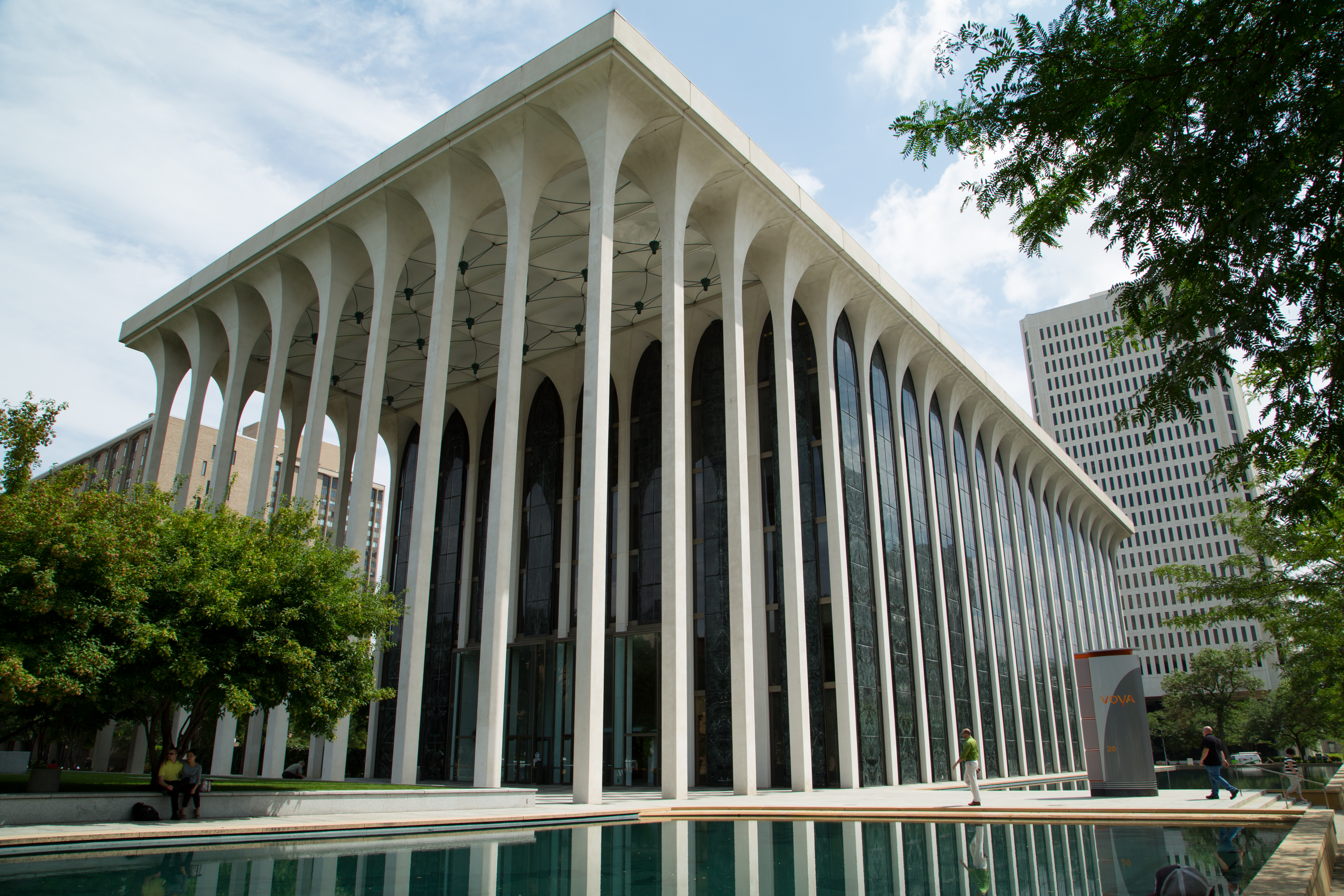
Voya Financial building in downtown Minneapolis, pictured in August 2014

In 2013, ING U.S. was spun off in an initial public offering ahead of its planned rebranding as Voya Financial. The IPO was priced on 1 May 2013 at US$19.50 per share, with 65.2 million shares sold for roughly US$1.3 billion in proceeds, reducing ING Group's ownership to about 75%. Shares began trading on 2 May 2013 on the New York Stock Exchange.

Led by chairman and CEO Rodney O. Martin Jr., Voya had 13 million customers and reported a profit of $473 million in 2012, with around 7,000 employees. Across three transactions in 2014, ING further reduced its stake in Voya to 19% by the end of that year. In March 2015, ING sold its remaining shares in Voya for €1.8 billion, realizing a profit of €285 million. The company completed its rebranding to Voya Financial in September 2014.

=== India ===
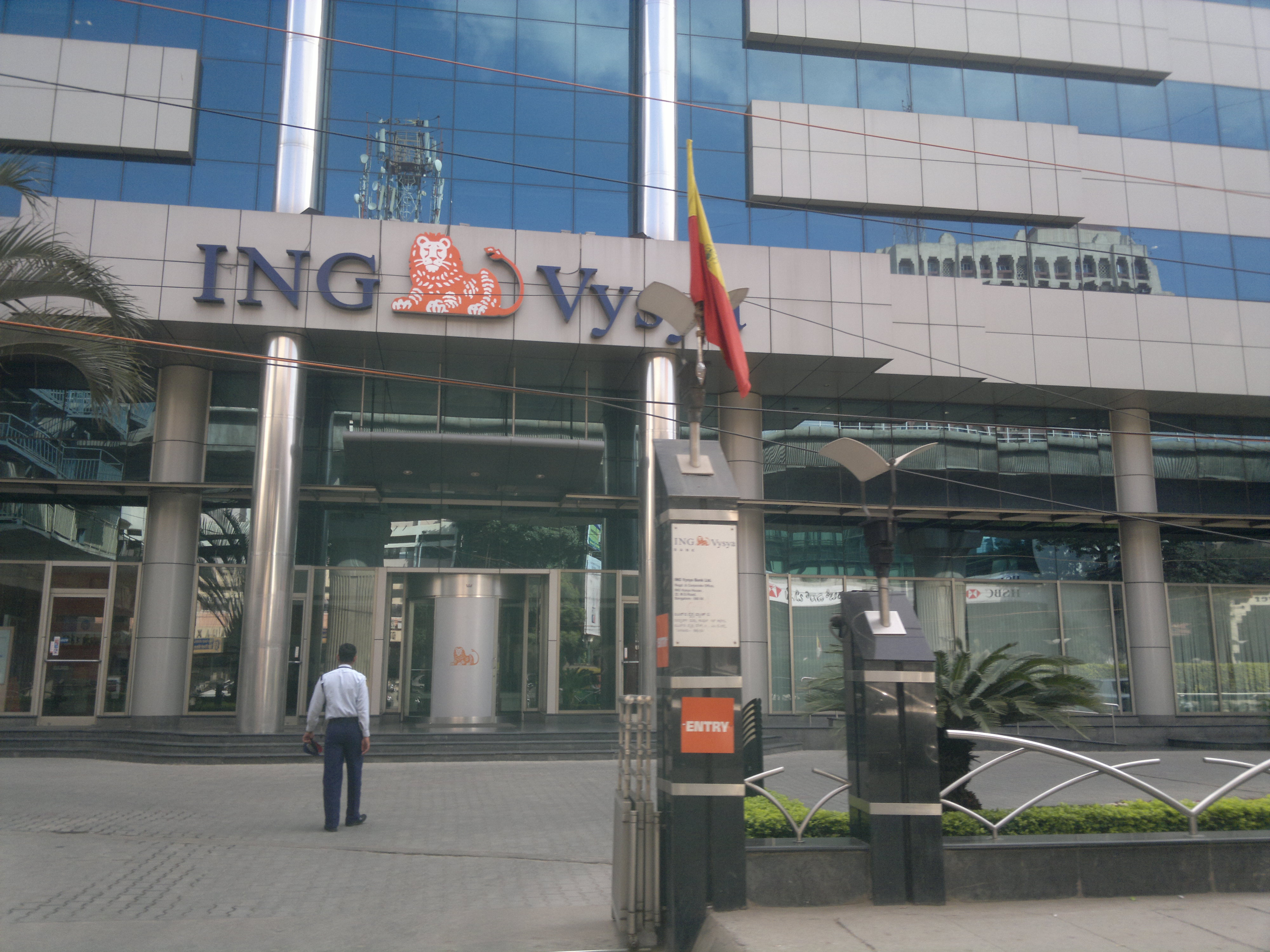
Offices of the ING Vysya Bank at the MG Road in Bengaluru, pictured in 2012

ING Vysya Bank was a privately owned Indian bank tracing its roots to 1930, renamed after ING acquired a controlling stake in 2002. ING held a 42.7% stake in ING Vysya Bank at the time of its 2014 merger announcement, and had earlier held a 26% stake in its life-insurance joint venture ING Vysya Life Insurance, sold in 2013. The bank operated over 490 branches, serving more than two million customers.

In June 2010, ING sold a 3.1% stake in the Indian lender Kotak Mahindra Bank for $175 million as part of its post-bailout "back to basics" asset-disposal program. In November 2014, Kotak Mahindra Bank announced an all-stock merger with ING Vysya Bank; the merger was completed in April 2015, after which the ING Vysya legal entity ceased to exist, and ING received a 6.5% stake in the combined Kotak Mahindra Bank. ING reduced this stake to 3.9% in September 2016 by selling 46.7 million shares for €490 million, and completed its full divestment from Kotak Mahindra Bank in 2020.

=== Czech Republic ===
In February 2021, ING announced it would withdraw from retail banking in the Czech Republic by the end of that year, after more than 20 years in the market offering savings accounts and mutual funds. At the time, ING served 375,000 retail customers. Rather than transferring the business to an acquirer, ING reached an agreement with Raiffeisenbank to offer its customers a preferential welcome deal to voluntarily move their savings and investments there. ING retained its Wholesale Banking activities in the Czech Republic, citing limited prospects for reaching sufficient scale in the retail market as the reason for its exit.

=== Austria ===
By the end of 2021, ING withdrew from retail banking in Austria, transferring around 150,000 current-account, mortgage and consumer-loan customers to bank99, the bank of the Austrian postal service, and discontinuing its savings-only offering.

== Financial results ==
By the end of 1996, ING had consolidated total assets of NLG 483.9 billion (US$258 billion) and a net profit of NLG 3.3 billion (US$1.8 billion). In 2007, ING reported record profits, partly driven by a €2 billion profit on the sale of its stakes in ABN AMRO and Numico. On 31 December 2007, ING had a market capitalization of €60 billion. According to Forbes, ING was the world's ninth-largest company by size in 2007; the group was, after Mitsubishi Bank, the largest savings bank in the world. On 16 May 2007, ING announced a share buyback program worth €5 billion. The program began in June 2007 and all shares had been bought and cancelled by mid-2008. The buyback was made possible by the introduction of the new Basel II supervisory regime, which gave ING a capital surplus.

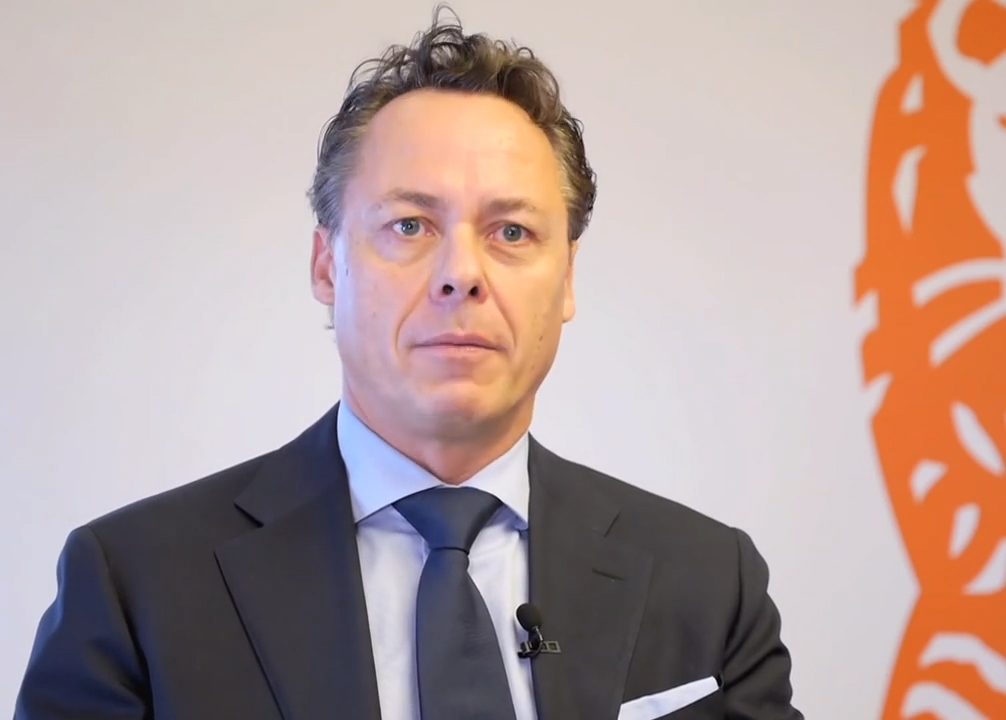
Ralph Hamers, the ING Group's CEO between 2013 and 2020

The sharp decline in results from 2008 onward was a consequence of the financial crisis. By the end of 2008, ING's market capitalization had fallen to €15 billion. The number of employees fell by around a third, or nearly 40,000 in total, between 2007 and 2012, a result both of the sale of business activities and of internal restructuring. Banking activities remained ING Group's principal business. After fully repaying state aid in November 2014, ING Group was able to resume paying dividends for the first time since the financial crisis.

For the full year 2025, ING reported total income of €23.0 billion and a net result of €6.327 billion, with a return on tangible equity (ROTE) of 13.6%. Fee income grew 15% year-on-year to €4.6 billion, driven by growth in investment products, daily banking and Wholesale Banking. The CET1 capital ratio stood at 13.1% at year-end 2025, above the regulatory minimum of 11.06%. For the first quarter of 2026, ING reported total income of €5.823 billion and a net result of €1.556 billion, with ROTE on a four-quarter rolling basis of 13.6%. ING reconfirmed its 2026 outlook of €24 billion in total income and a ROTE above 14%.

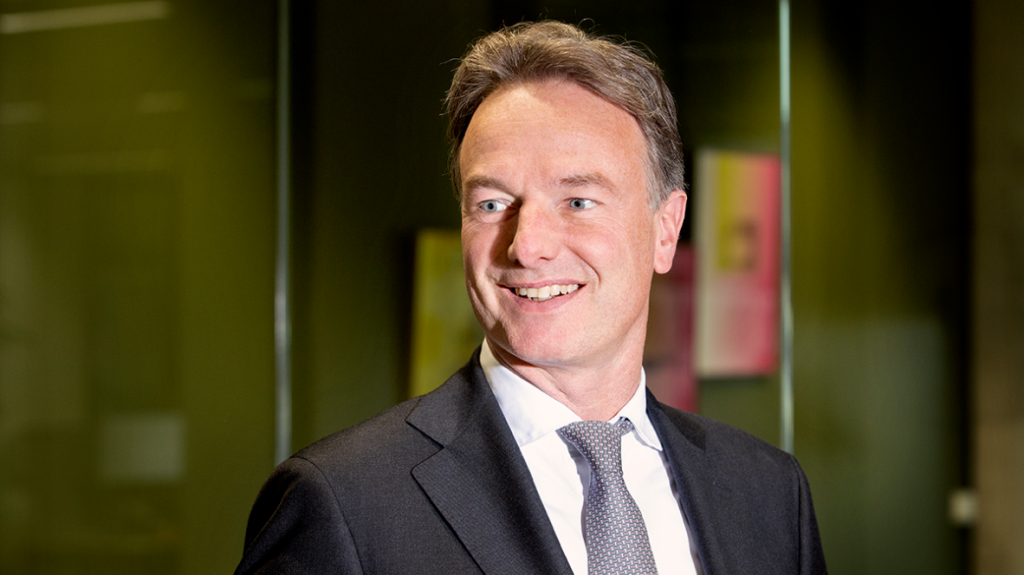
Steven van Rijswijk, the ING Group's CEO since July 2020

Ralph Hamers, CEO from 2013, drove ING's digital-first "Think Forward" strategy and its smartphone-banking platform before departing in 2020. Steven van Rijswijk — a 25-year ING veteran educated at Erasmus University Rotterdam, who had served as head of corporate clients (2010), head of client coverage in Wholesale Banking (2014), and chief risk officer (2017) — became CEO on 1 July 2020. He has signaled appetite for acquisition-led growth and a push toward ING becoming a "universal bank" in target markets. ING's published strategic targets for 2027 originally included annual total-income growth of 4–5%, fee income of €5 billion, a cost/income ratio of 52–54%, and a return on equity of 14%.

In January 2025, chief operating officer Marnix van Stiphout stated that ING was committed to organic growth within its existing markets, ruling out geographic expansion and prioritizing digital banking and cross-selling of products to drive fee income. In January 2026, ING upgraded its 2027 financial targets to total income of more than €25 billion and a return on tangible equity above 15%.

== Corporate headquarters ==
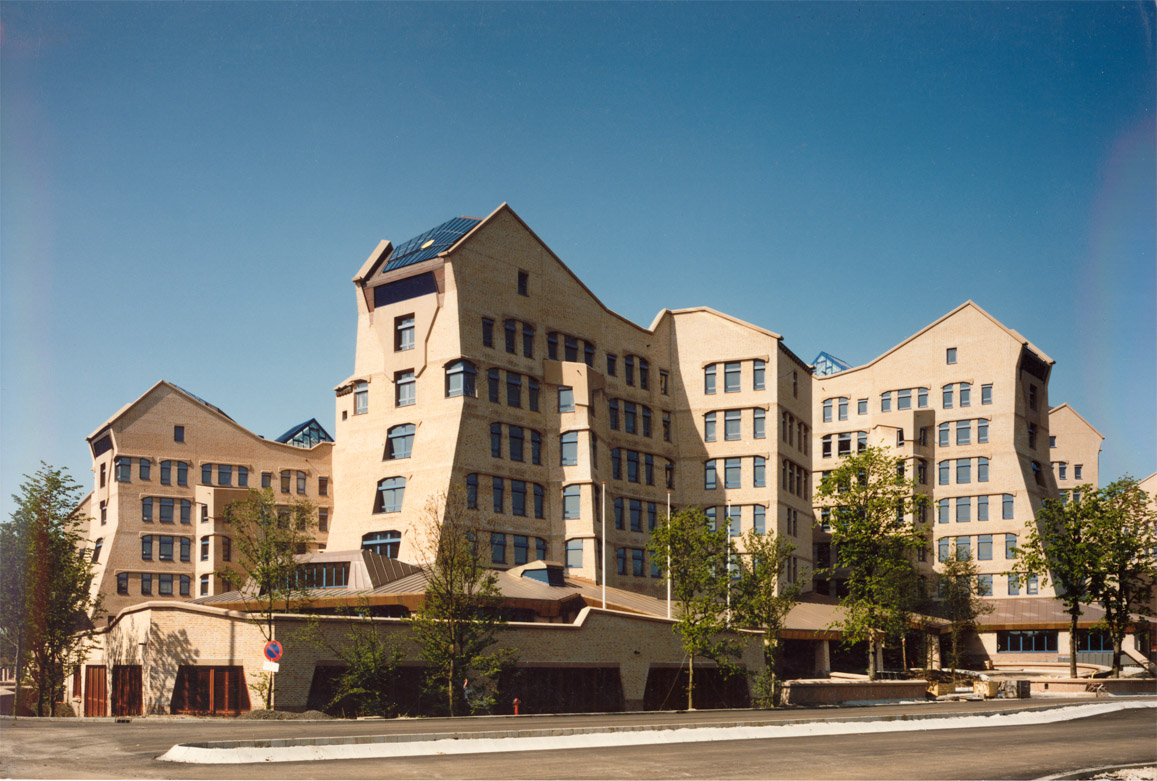
The Amsterdamse Poort aka The Sandcastle, in Amsterdam-Zuidoost, the NMB–ING HQ between 1987 and 2010

ING's predecessor NMB opened a purpose-built head office in 1987 at Bijlmerplein in the Amsterdam-Zuidoost district, officially named Amsterdamse Poort after the adjoining shopping center. Designed by architects Anton Alberts and Max van Huut in an organic architectural style, the building became popularly known as The Sandcastle ("Het Zandkasteel"), a nickname inspired by its sand-coloured façade and sculptural, castle-like form. It served as the headquarters of NMB and, following the 1991 merger, of ING.

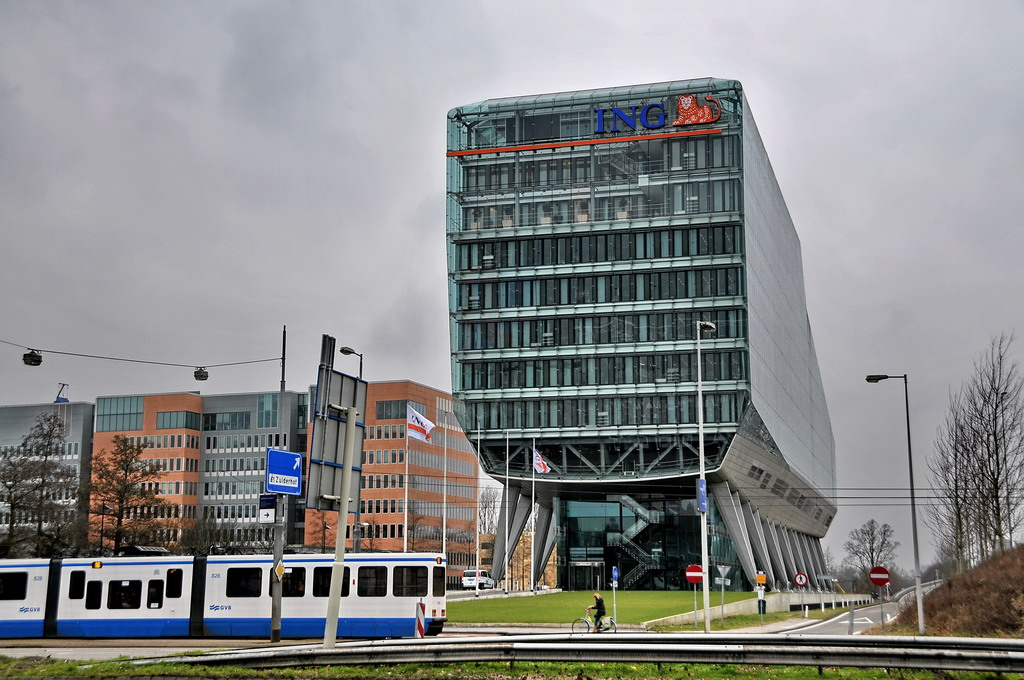
The Infinity, formerly the ING House, in Amsterdam's Zuidas, pictured in 2009

In 2002, ING's Executive Board relocated to a newly built headquarters, ING House in Zuidas, the business district of Amsterdam. Designed by Roberto Meyer and Jeroen van Schooten, and opened on 16 September 2002 by then-Prince Willem-Alexander, the building was intended to project ING's ambitions as a global financial institution. It is 28 metres wide, 138 metres long, and 48 metres high at its highest point.

Following the operational and later legal separation of ING's banking and insurance businesses, ING House became the head office of the newly independent NN Group from 2012 to 2014, while ING Bank and ING Group's own leadership returned to the original Amsterdamse Poort building. In total, including its original 1987–2002 period, ING occupied the Amsterdamse Poort building for more than 30 years before its lease expired in 2019. ING House itself has since been renamed the Infinity.

Since 2020, ING's corporate head office is the Cedar, situated in Cumulus Park, part of Amsterdam's innovation district in the south-east Bijlmermeer neighborhood, near the site of the former Amsterdamse Poort building. The five-story building has a glass façade and is named after the cedar tree, symbolizing sustainability and growth. The move followed an assessment that the ageing Amsterdamse Poort building — with its small windows and fragmented floor plates — no longer suited modern working needs, and that renovating it would have been prohibitively expensive.

== Controversies and regulatory actions ==
=== Money laundering investigations ===
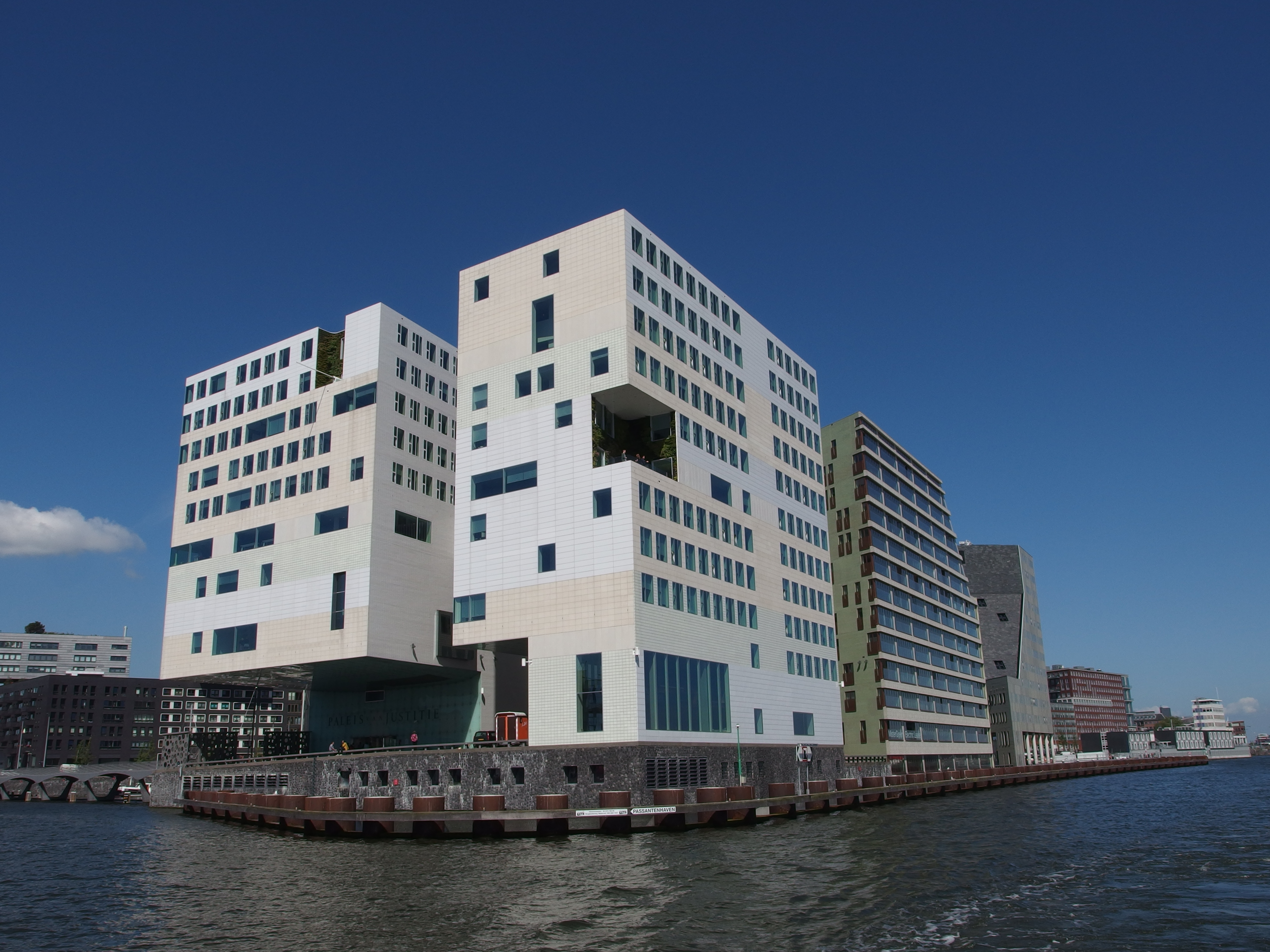
Offices of the Public Prosecutor at the IJ waterfront in Amsterdam

ING, which held the accounts Vimpelcom used to channel bribes to Uzbek officials, came under scrutiny from the Public Prosecutor's Office following VimpelCom's 2016 settlement — at $795 million, the largest such settlement in Dutch history. ING's chief financial officer Koos Timmermans stepped down. According to the prosecution, the bank was negligent in preventing money laundering. Between 2010 and 2016, clients misused accounts at ING to launder hundreds of millions of euros. Following the 2018 settlement, chief executive Hamers said the bank backed EU proposals for a new cross-border authority to fight money laundering.

In February 2019, an investigation found that ING had provided a total of US$3.5 billion in financing to the companies Odebrecht, Gunvor, Shell and SBM Offshore, all of which had for years been linked to corruption scandals. In 2019, it also emerged that ING's Moscow branch had continued for years to work with a company that the bank itself had suspected of involvement in money laundering as early as 2009. In September 2020, FinCEN Files disclosed that ING in Poland helped Russian and Ukrainian clients to launder huge amounts of money out of Russia.

=== 2012 settlement with US Treasury Department ===
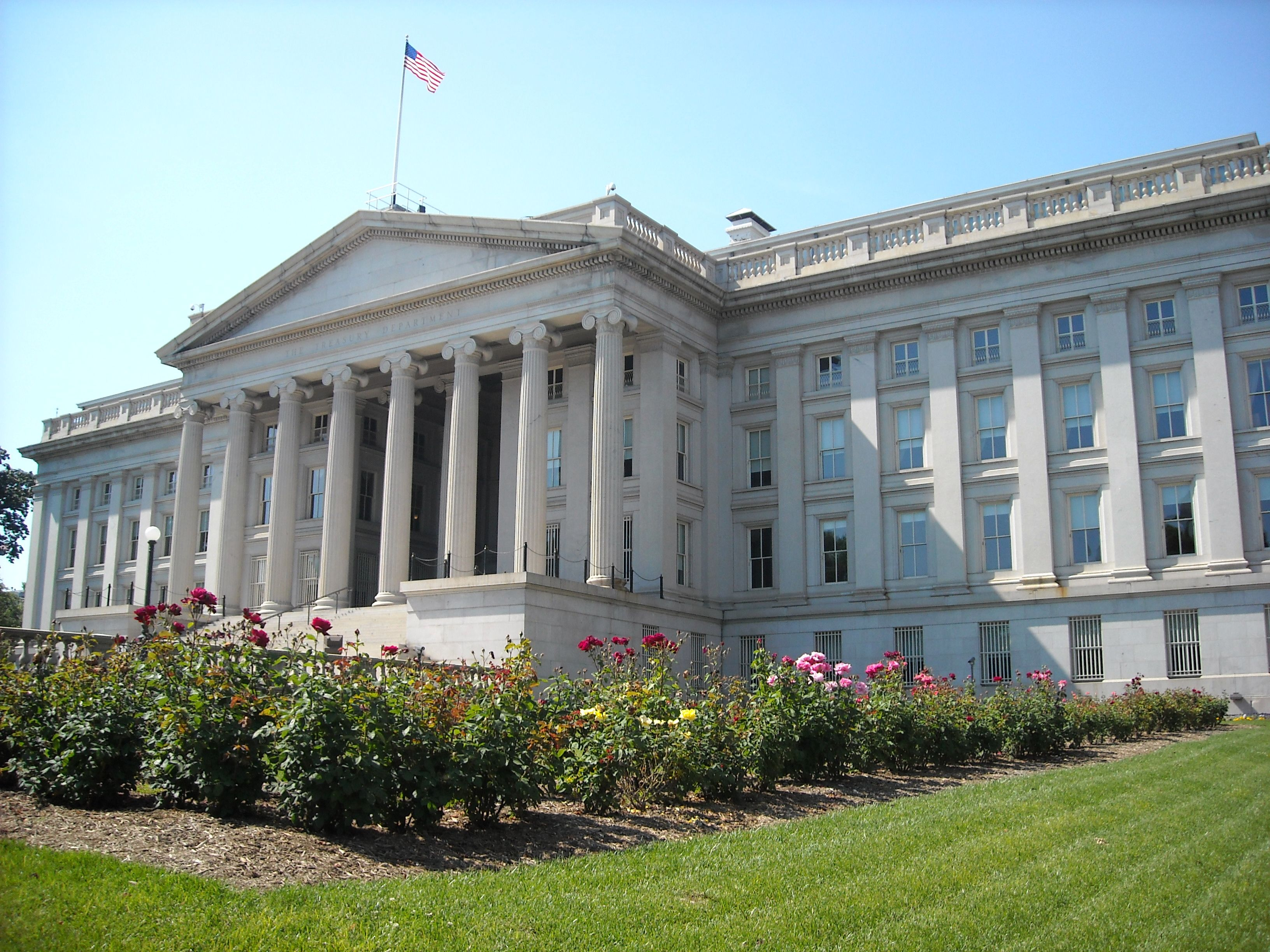
Treasury Building in Washington, D.C.

In June 2012, ING Bank N.V. agreed to forfeit US$619 million — then the largest such penalty ever imposed on a financial institution for U.S. sanctions violations — to settle criminal charges brought by the U.S. Department of Justice and the Manhattan District Attorney's office, alongside a parallel civil settlement with the U.S. Treasury's Office of Foreign Assets Control. The settlement resolved findings that ING had intentionally stripped identifying information from more than 20,000 financial transactions between 2002 and 2007 to conceal that they involved sanctioned parties in Cuba, Iran, Sudan, Burma, and Libya, routing the payments through the U.S. financial system via shell companies and other measures. In violation of the International Emergency Economic Powers Act (IEEPA) and the Trading with the Enemy Act. ING entered into a deferred prosecution agreement and admitted to falsifying the records of New York financial institutions.

According to the Treasury Department's findings, this concealment method was not confined to Curaçao: ING's Wholesale Banking units in France, Belgium and the Netherlands applied the same approach when routing U.S. dollar payments and trade-finance transactions through the United States. In France, bank management went further, creating and supplying Cuban financial institutions with counterfeit ING endorsement stamps so that traveler's cheques tied to Cuba could clear U.S. payment systems without detection. Separately, the Trade and Commodity Finance unit within Dutch Wholesale Banking funneled payments for sanctioned Cuban clients through unrelated corporate intermediaries to mask their identities, while the bank's Romanian branch stripped key details from a letter of credit — processed via a U.S. bank — that financed the export of American-origin goods to Iran.

=== Russia operations and Ukraine sanctions ===
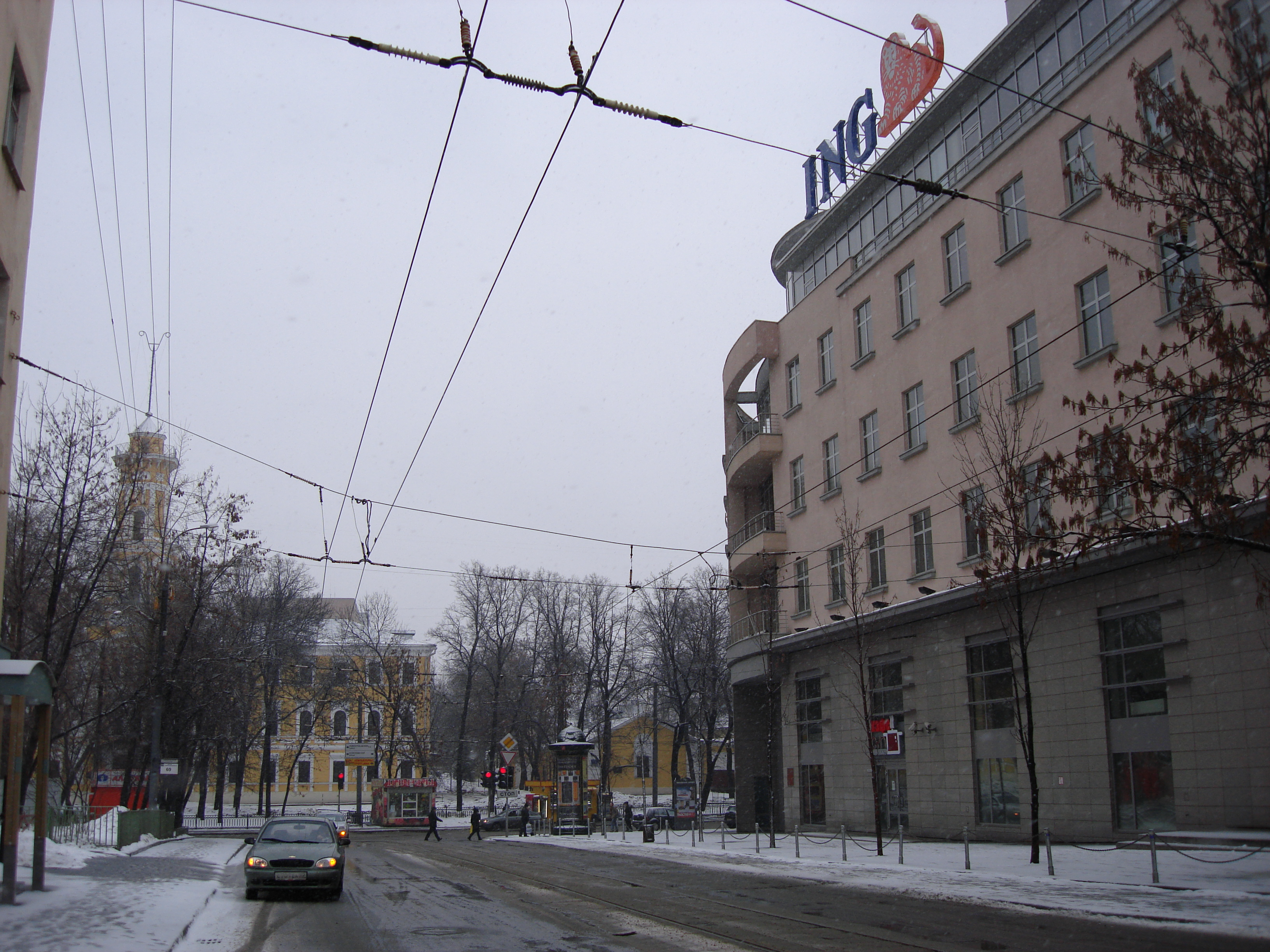
ING office building in Moscow's Tverskoy District, pictured in 2007

ING Bank has faced sustained criticism for maintaining operations in Russia despite the international sanctions and geopolitical tensions following the Russian invasion of Ukraine. According to the Leave Russia project, which tracks companies' continued presence in the Russian market, ING remained active in the country, raising concerns among campaigners about the bank's alignment with international sanctions efforts.

In February 2023, CEO van Rijswijk told the Dutch parliament that ING saw no future for itself in Russia, but said that withdrawing outstanding corporate credit immediately would effectively amount to "a gift" to Russian clients rather than a genuine exit. ING's Russian profit rose sharply to €151 million in 2023. The bank reduced its outstanding credit to Russian-linked companies from €6.7 billion in February 2022 to €1 billion by the end of September 2024, and continued to hold €1 billion in loans to Russian clients through non-Russian subsidiaries after the planned 2025 sale. In April 2022, ING capped account balances at €100,000 for customers holding Russian or Belarusian nationality, affecting several thousand accounts. Separately, in March 2022 an Amsterdam court ruled that ING could not terminate its banking relationship with a trust office that served a large number of Russia-linked clients, citing banks' general duty of care to their customers. ING had first tried to end the relationship in 2019 and again after Russia's invasion.

In January 2025, ING agreed to sell its Russian business to Global Development JSC, owned by a Moscow-based investor, in a deal expected to result in a €700 million hit to profits after tax, including a book loss of €400 million, a later revised to an expected €800 million loss as the deal dragged on. The bank said it had reduced lending to Russian clients by 75% since February 2022. Regulatory approval for the sale was blocked by the Kremlin, which Dutch reporting attributed to Russia's interest in keeping Western banks operating in the country as a channel maintaining its access to the international payments system. ING's Russian subsidiary reported 2025 results of total assets of €1,086 million (up 42.1%), gross profit of €157 million (up 58.6%), and taxes paid of €35 million. However, the agreement was terminated in April 2026 after the buyer failed to secure the regulatory approvals required from Russian authorities. ING stated it continues to pursue an exit from the Russian market, though as of mid-2026 it had not yet completed its withdrawal (see § Global operations, for the bank's corporate structure in Russia).

=== Sustainability and environmental criticism ===
According to research by Netwerk Vlaanderen, ING, together with Bank of China, arranged the 2003 share issuance of Avichina, a Chinese company supplying military aircraft to countries subject to an EU arms embargo. In 2005 – ING, together with Axa, Fortis, Dexia and KBC – invested more than €6.6 billion in companies implicated in human rights violations. The companies and projects in which the banks invested were controversial for their support of dictatorial regimes, forced relocations and forced labor, including criticism relating to investment in a gas pipeline in Myanmar and the Baku–Tbilisi–Ceyhan pipeline through Turkey, Azerbaijan and Georgia. ING invested more than US$900 million in seven major nuclear weapons manufacturers.

In 2006, ING had €200 billion invested under sustainable investment criteria and, with a score of 73.5 (versus a sector average of 47.4), ranked second in sustainability among AEX-listed companies, according to research by Dutch Sustainability Research. In 2007, ING, together with 32 other banks, provided $10 billion in credit to Freeport-McMoRan, a company criticized for serious human rights violations and for discharging polluted mining waste into rivers in the Papua province of Indonesia.

Between 2011 and 2016, ING invested over US$5 billion in mining companies with questionable human rights and environmental records.

ING states that it does not invest in controversial weapons such as anti-personnel mines and cluster munitions, although the manufacturers of such weapons are not themselves excluded from investment.

ING finances the palm-oil company SOCFIN, which has been linked to land grabbing, deforestation and human rights violations. ING has invested more than €1 billion in companies linked to deforestation and human rights violations, and connected to the fires in and around the Amazon. ING is the largest Dutch financier of seven major shale-gas and plastics companies, with US$4 billion in financing.

ING has set sustainability commitments including a stated ambition to mobilize €150 billion in sustainable finance annually by 2027, implemented through its "Terra" approach, which steers the lending portfolio by reference to climate-sector targets aligned with the Paris Agreement. The approach originated in 2018, when ING as one of the first major banks announced it would assess its entire $600 billion lending portfolio against climate impact, using climate scenarios from the International Energy Agency.

According to a broadcast of the Dutch television program "Pointer" in November 2022, ING Bank, with financing of $7 billion, is the second-largest financier of LNG terminals in the United States. The gas originates partly from the Permian Basin in West Texas, where oil and gas production generates more greenhouse gas emissions than anywhere else in the world. From there, it is transported to ING-financed terminals on the Gulf of Mexico, where it is cooled to −162 °C to be shipped in liquid form to Europe and Asia.

A report on the activities of the European financial sector, published in March 2024, found that ING, together with Rabobank, ranked among the top five European banks threatening forests and the climate; ING was said to have provided €23 billion in financing in this context. Earlier engagement with ING had not led to changes in its policy and strategy, prompting efforts to compel the bank, through European regulation, to adopt a less environmentally damaging investment policy.

In September 2024, chief executive van Rijswijk said ING would restrict or stop financing corporate clients that fail to make sufficient progress on reducing their carbon footprint, based on an assessment of 2,000 of its largest clients' climate transition plans, with a deadline for progress set at 2026; the bank also said it would stop financing new LNG export terminals from 2025 and end new financing for pure-play upstream oil and gas companies developing new fields.

== Sponsorships ==
=== Sports sponsorships ===
Sports events sponsored by ING

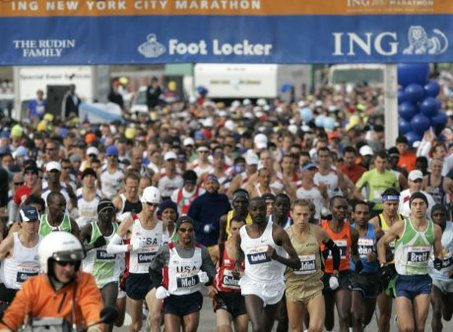
2007 New York City Marathon

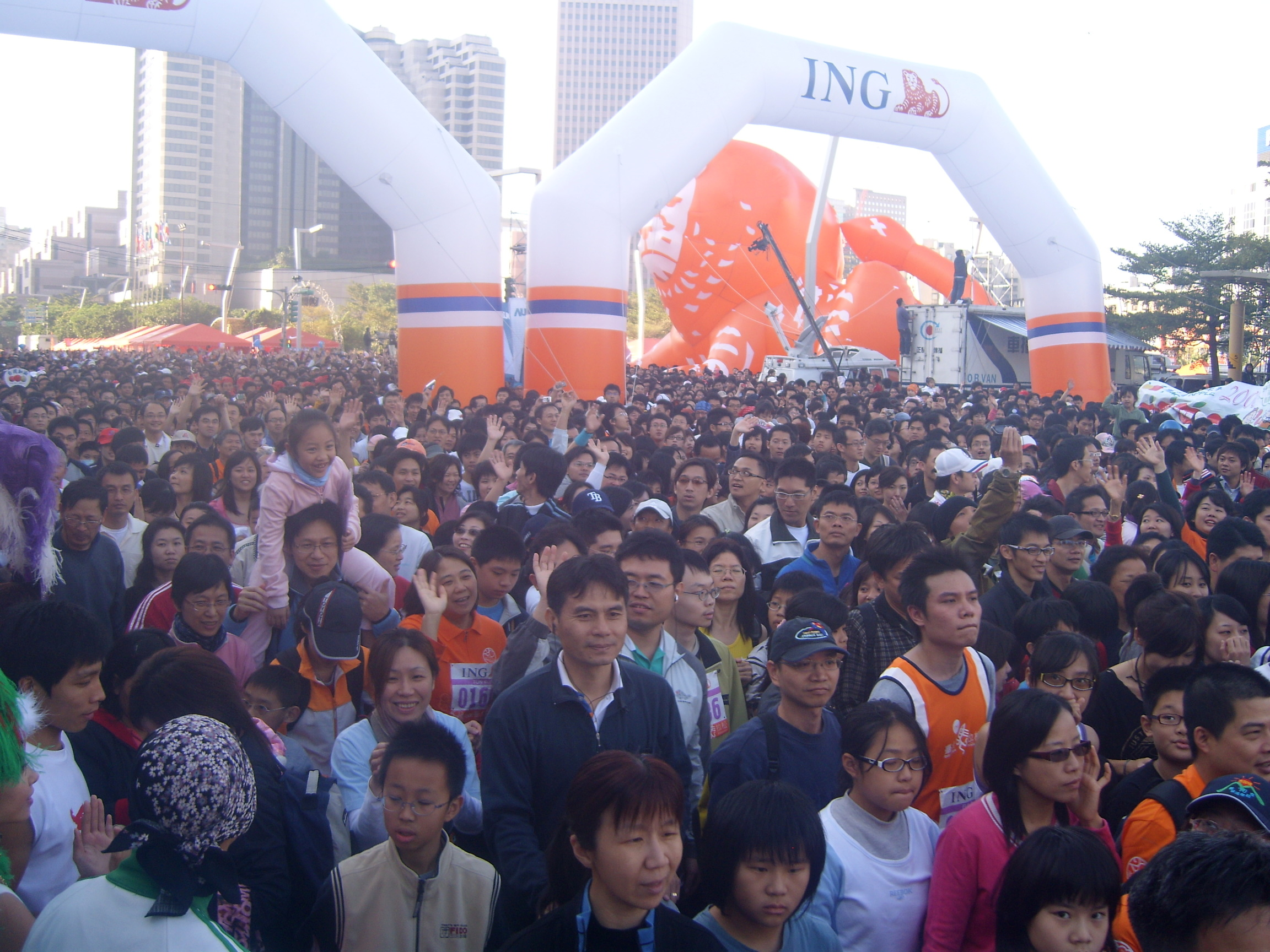
The Taipei International Marathon in 2008

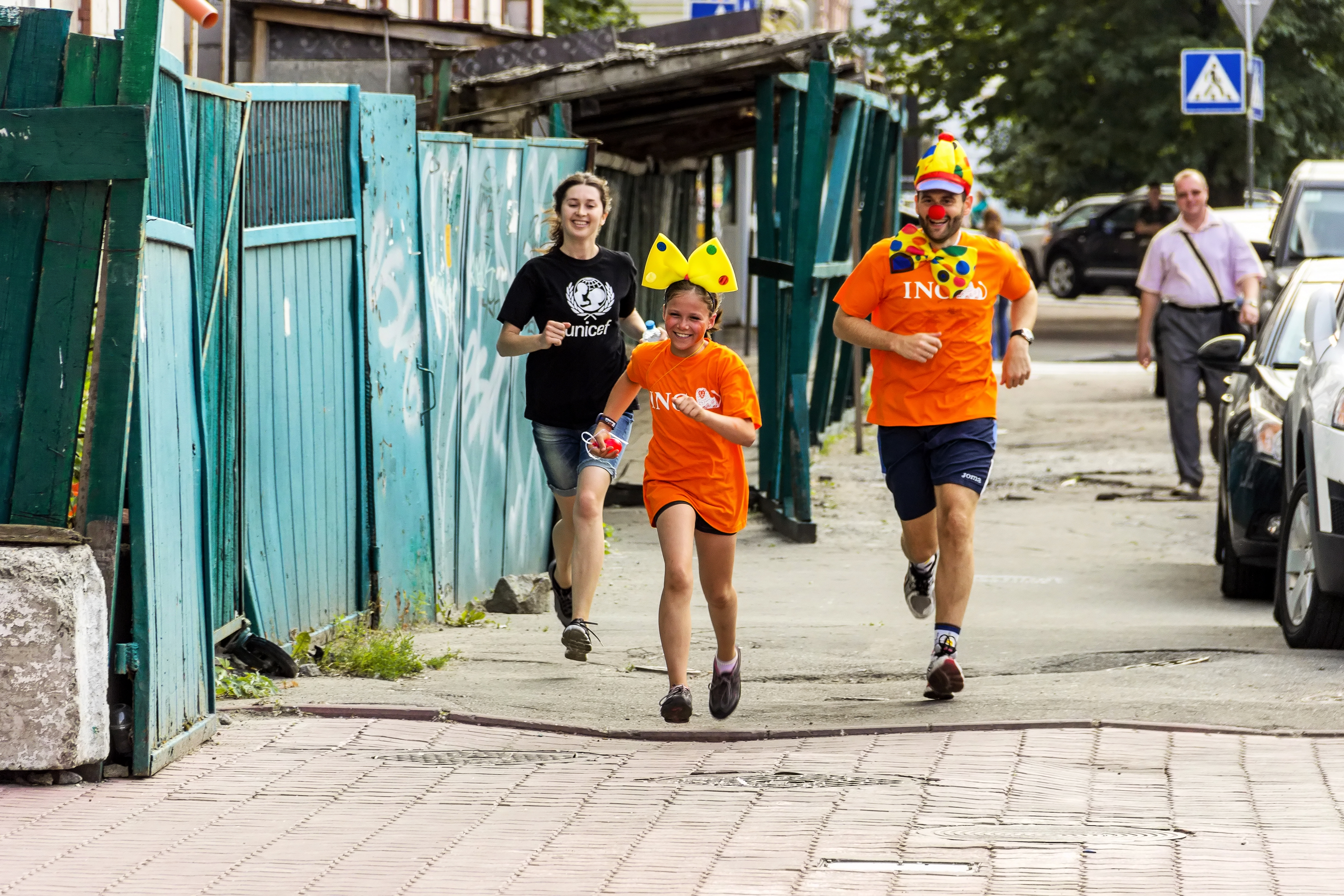
ING Run for UNICEF in Kyiv, in 2015

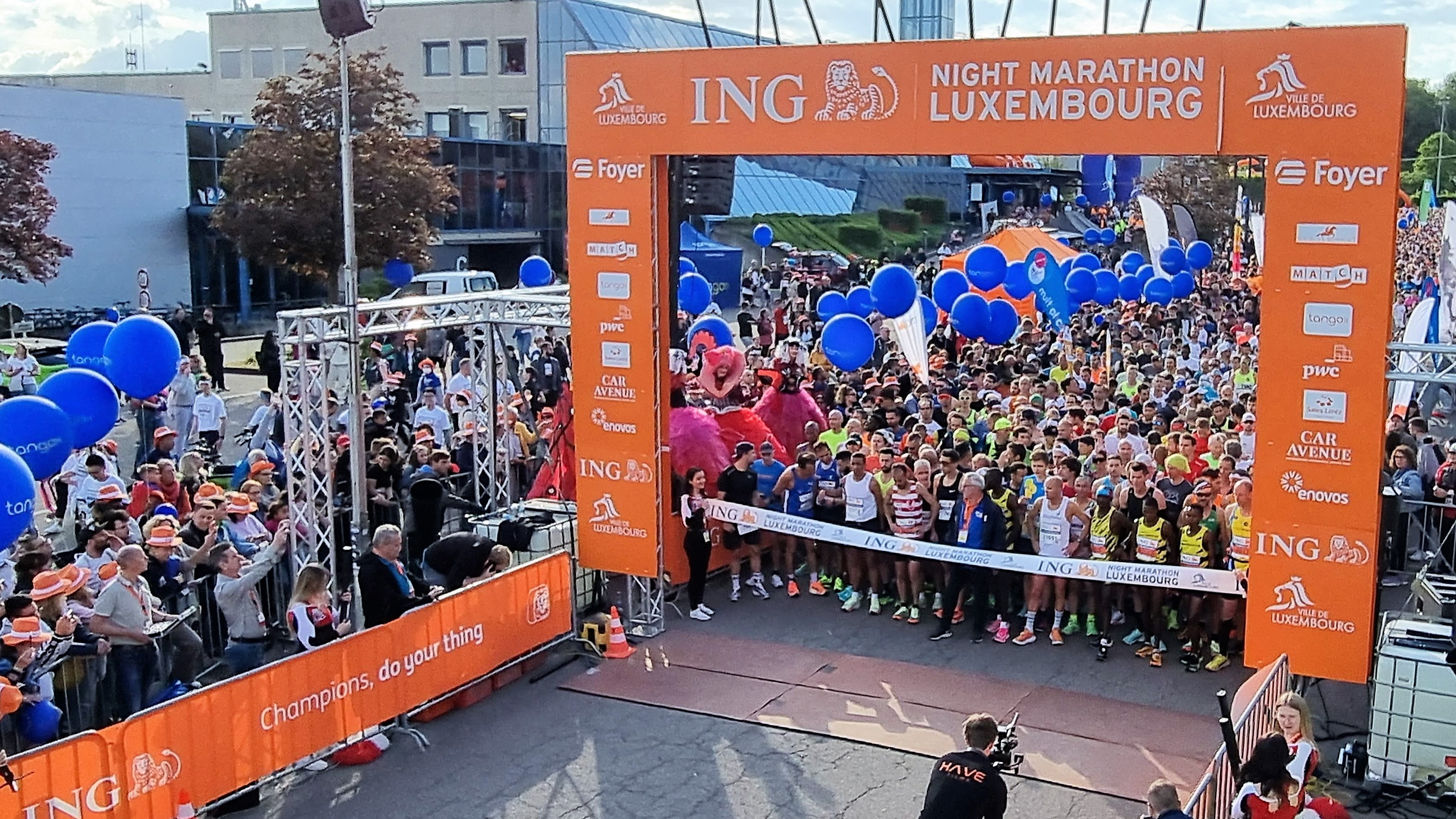
ING Night Marathon Luxembourg in 2022

ING sponsors sporting events and artistic exhibitions throughout the world. For several years, ING was the title sponsor of marathons including the New York City Marathon (2003–2010), the Miami Marathon, the Georgia Marathon, the Luxembourg Marathon, the Hartford Marathon, the Philadelphia Distance Run, and San Francisco's Bay to Breakers (2005–2010).

ING is a major global sponsor of association football, sponsoring the Royal Dutch Football Association, and the Royal Belgian Football Association. It also sponsors German Basketball Federation.

ING was the title sponsor of the Renault Formula One team from the 2007 season to the 2009 season. It was the title sponsor of the Australian Grand Prix and Belgian Grand Prix, the Hungarian Grand Prix, and the Turkish Grand Prix. ING ended its sponsorship of Renault in part due to a reduction in advertising spending and in part due to controversy surrounding the Renault Formula One team.

It also sponsored the ING Cup cricket competition in Australia between 2001 and 2006, a domestic limited overs competition.

=== Culture ===
Since 1989, ING has been the main sponsor of the Royal Concertgebouw Orchestra.

Since 2008, ING has sponsored the annual LGBT event Pride Amsterdam.

== Art collection ==
Paintings from the ING collection

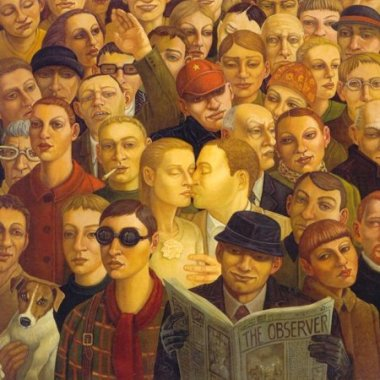
The Kiss (2001) by Bernardien Sternheim

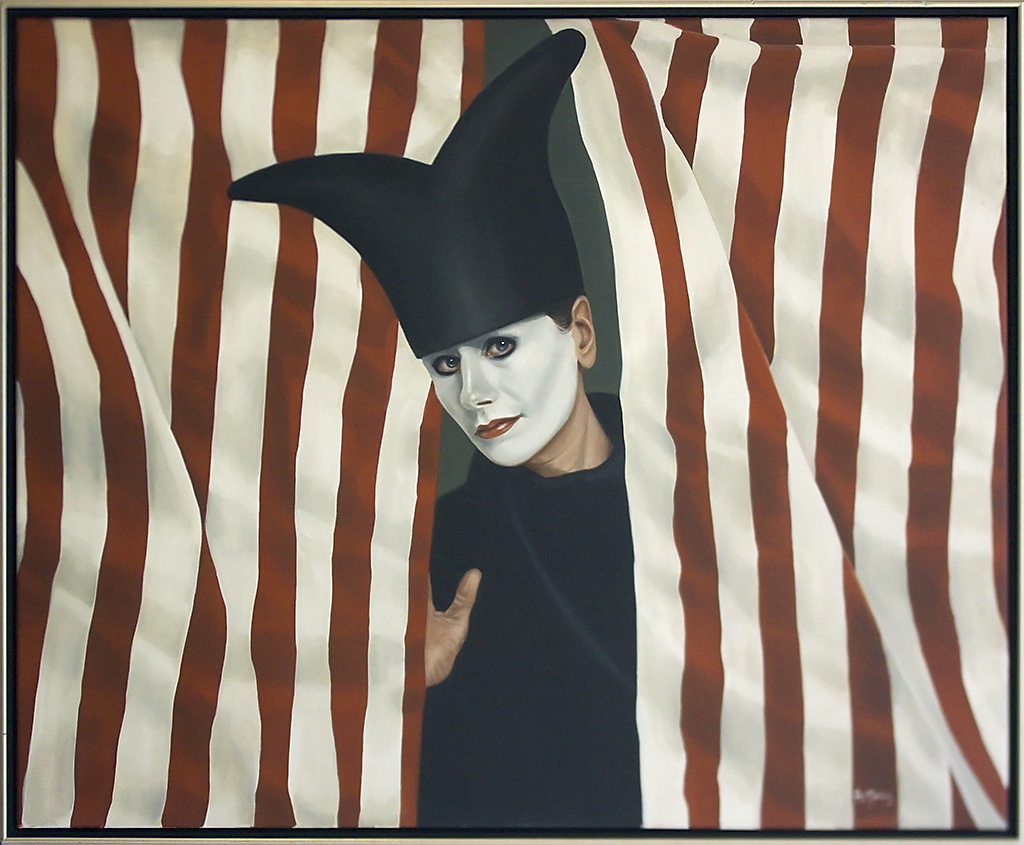
Pierrot, a self portrait by Ans Markus

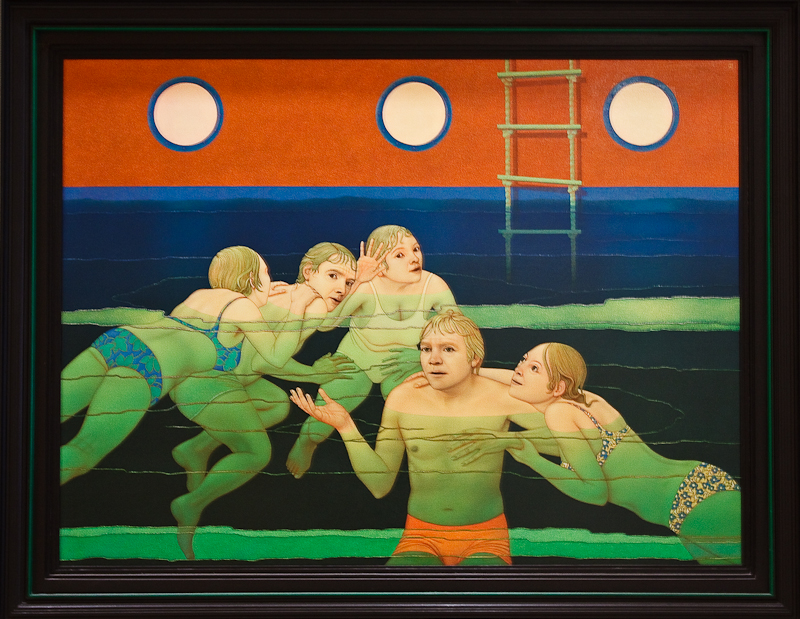
Swimmers by Dick Pieters (1993)

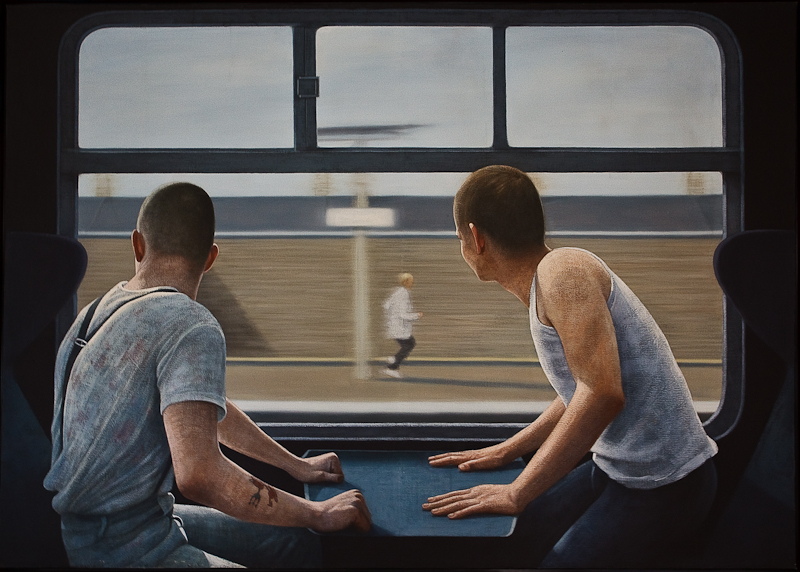
Compartments II by Graham Dean (1979)

ING's sponsorships in the arts include the Rijksmuseum, and a corporate membership in the New York Museum of Modern Art. ING owns and houses proprietary art collections in Belgium, Mexico, the Netherlands, Poland, and the United Kingdom.

ING Group owns a large art collection that has been built up since 1974, when one of its predecessors, NMB Bank, began collecting contemporary figurative Dutch art. The collection grew through successive mergers: in 1989, the addition of Postbank brought works by abstract artists including Ad Dekkers and Joost Baljeu; in 1991, the merger with Nationale-Nederlanden incorporated that insurer's holdings, which included Hague School and French art, among them works by Pat Andrea. Further expansion followed during the 1990s through the acquisitions of Barings Bank and Bank Śląski of Poland, eventually yielding five distinct sub-collections.

The collection centers on contemporary Dutch figurative art, encompassing expressionist, impressionist, realist and magical realist works. Artists represented in the collection include Iris van Dongen, Bernardien Sternheim, Ans Markus, Henk Helmantel, and Philip Akkerman. The collection also includes photography by Erwin Olaf, and abstract work by artists such as Peter Struycken and Joost Baljeu. ING's UK art collection inherited from Barings Bank includes works by Samuel Palmer, Stanley Spencer, and L. S. Lowry, with a focus on modern British artists; it is housed at the bank's London Wall offices, and has been made accessible through gallery loans and schools programs.

ING Belgium also holds its own art collection. It is diverse and represents many late-20th-century art movements including neo-expressionism, Arte Povera, the New British Sculpture, and the New Objectivity. It originates in purchases made by Léon Lambert and Louis Camus at Bank van Brussel.

At its peak the combined collection contained over 25,000 works. According to Annabelle Birnie, director of ING Art Management, the bank considered it a social responsibility to make the works accessible to the public: a large portion hung in its insurance buildings and bank offices, while another part was loaned to museums and art lending centers. In later years, a redesigned banking model reduced the number of office locations, leaving less wall space for art. In 2009, around 2,500 lower-market works were auctioned via eBay; the €150,000 in proceeds was donated to UNICEF.

In September 2010, ING donated 271 paintings to the Drents Museum in Assen, which specializes in contemporary figurative art. The museum's director, Michel van Maarseveen, described the gift as "the finest example of contemporary figurative art in the Netherlands". ING entered into negotiations with further museums and explored options for hospitals and care institutions. By 2021, the collection had been reduced from its peak to 6,000 works.

== See also ==
- Inter-Alpha Group of Banks
- List of banks in the euro area
- List of banks in the Netherlands
- NN Group
- Chipknip
