= Women's Media Center =

American nonprofit women's organization

- Formation: 2005; 21 years ago
- Founders: Jane Fonda; Robin Morgan; Gloria Steinem
- Type: 501(c)(3) nonprofit
- Headquarters: United States
- Services: Women's rights
- Official language: English
- Website: womensmediacenter.com

Women's Media Center (WMC) is an American 501(c)(3) nonprofit women's organization founded in the United States in 2005 by writers and activists Jane Fonda, Robin Morgan, and Gloria Steinem. Led by president Julie Burton, WMC's work includes advocacy campaigns, bestowing awards to women in media, media and leadership training, and the creation of original content.

== Women's representation in media ==
The Women's Media Center "works to ensure women are powerfully and visibly represented in the media" and "to diversify the media in its content and sources, so that the stories and perspectives of women and girls are more accurately portrayed." The organization convenes panels, issues reports, organizes grassroots campaigns, and meets with media outlets to address issues of women's representation and general diversity.

In response to the report from the American Psychological Association's Task Force on the Sexualization of Girls, the Women's Media Center partnered with more than ten other organizations to organize the SPARK Summit, also known as the Sexualization Protest: Action, Resistance, Knowledge. The SPARK Summit took place on October 22, 2010, at Hunter College in New York City.

The Women's Media Center gives out a Social Media Award, which "recognizes individuals who have made outstanding contributions to advancing women's and girls’ visibility and power in media". Jude Doyle received the first award in 2011.

== Media training and expert sources ==
In 2008, WMC launched the Progressive Women's Voices media and leadership training program to connect qualified, authoritative women experts to editors, reporters, producers, and bookers. SheSource, WMC's online database of more than 500 women experts, serves journalists looking for female sources, commentators, and guests.

== Sexism watchdog ==
WMC acts as a watchdog for sexism in the media and develops campaigns to advocate for fair and balanced coverage. During the 2008 presidential election, WMC released a video "Sexism Sells but We're Not Buying It", along with a petition campaign to call attention to sexism against female candidates during the primaries. Another video, "Media Justice for Sotomayor", discusses racist and sexist media coverage during the 2009 confirmation hearings of Supreme Court Justice Sonia Sotomayor.

On August 31, 2010, the WMC partnered with the Women's Campaign Forum Foundation and the Political Parity Initiative of the Hunt Alternatives Fund to launch Name it. Change it. (NICI), a ground-breaking national campaign that addresses sexism in the media targeted at female politicians and political candidates. NICI aims to ensure accountability through a coordinated rapid response network to dramatically decrease incidents of media misogyny.

== Health care reform and reproductive rights ==
In reaction to the 2009 Stupak–Pitts Amendment, and other proposed health care reform legislation limiting access and funding for abortions, WMC began actively advocating for women's reproductive rights. On December 10, 2009, WMC announced the launch of its Not Under The Bus campaign to "keep women's health care fair, safe, and accessible to all."

With the campaign announcement, the organization declared its "first call to action is to stop the Stupak Amendment, the Hatch-Nelson Amendment, and others like them which are the most draconian restrictions on women since the 1977 Hyde Amendment that cut federal funding for abortions by Medicaid."

=== 2010 campaign against CBS and Focus on the Family ad ===
In January 2010, Women's Media Center and a coalition of more than 30 organizations "dedicated to reproductive rights, tolerance, and social justice" (including the National Organization for Women and NARAL Pro-Choice America) sent a letter to CBS, NFL and its advertisers calling on them to pull an advertisement featuring football player Tim Tebow, sponsored by conservative Christian group Focus on the Family (FOTF), from Super Bowl XLIV. The resulting campaign garnered widespread national media attention. Previously, in 2010 CBS had rejected a humorous ad from a gay online dating service, ManCrunch, and in 2004 an ad promoting the United Church of Christ as gay-friendly, citing a policy against any controversy in Super Bowl ad. CBS then decided to end this policy and accept controversial ads, so that the anti-abortion ad would be aired, which the Gay & Lesbian Alliance Against Defamation (GLAAD) called a "homophobic double standard".

In its letter to CBS, the WMC coalition denounced the actions of Focus on the Family and the politics of CBS, based on their acceptance of their advertisement.

The WMC campaign was criticized for freedom of speech concerns. An editorial in The New York Times called it censorship, and said that they should use this as an opportunity to promote their own movement. The Los Angeles Times, despite their stance in favor of abortion rights, congratulated CBS for their decision. Bill O'Reilly of Fox News said Greene and her group were, "trying to muzzle them. That's not the American way." The coalition responded with an op-ed article in Huffington Post in which former WMC President Jehmu Greene wrote that they were not attempting to censor anything, and suggested that the situation would be different if the Ku Klux Klan were involved.

During Super Bowl XLIV, CBS elected to air the two 30-second commercials, which included Tebow's personal story as part of an overall anti-abortion stance.

== Women Under Siege ==
Women Under Siege is a project of the Women's Media Center. It has reported on the use of rape as a means of oppression in Syria. Women Under Siege has also reported extensively about the continued use of rape as a weapon of war in Myanmar (also known as Burma).
