= Super Bowl XLIV =

2010 National Football League championship game

New Orleans Saints (1) (NFC) (13–3)	Indianapolis Colts (1) (AFC) (14–2)
31	17
Head coach: Sean Payton	Head coach: Jim Caldwell
	1	2	3	4	Total
NO	0	6	10	15	31
IND	10	0	7	0	17
- Date: February 7, 2010
- Stadium: Sun Life Stadium; Miami Gardens, Florida
- MVP: Drew Brees, quarterback
- Favorite: Colts by 5
- Referee: Scott Green
- Attendance: 74,059

Ceremonies
- National anthem: Carrie Underwood
- Coin toss: Emmitt Smith, representing the 2010 Pro Football Hall of Fame class
- Halftime show: The Who

TV in the United States
- Network: CBS
- Announcers: Jim Nantz (play-by-play); Phil Simms (analyst); Steve Tasker and Solomon Wilcots (sideline reporters)
- Nielsen ratings: 45.0 (national); 56.3 (New Orleans); 54.2 (Indianapolis); US viewership: 106.5 million est. avg., 153.4 million est. total
- Market share: 68 (national); 82 (New Orleans); 80 (Indianapolis)
- Cost of 30-second commercial: $2.5 – $2.8 million

Radio in the United States
- Network: Westwood One
- Announcers: Marv Albert, Boomer Esiason, James Lofton, and Mark Malone

Super Bowl XLIV was an American football game between the National Football Conference (NFC) champions New Orleans Saints and the American Football Conference (AFC) champions Indianapolis Colts to decide the National Football League (NFL) champion for the 2009 season. The underdog Saints upset the Colts by a 31–17 score, earning their first championship in franchise history. This was the first major professional sports championship ever won by a New Orleans-based team. The game was played at Sun Life Stadium (now Hard Rock Stadium) in Miami Gardens, Florida, for the fifth time (and in South Florida for the tenth time), on February 7, 2010.

This was the Saints' first ever Super Bowl appearance and the fourth for the Colts franchise, which was also their first appearance since Super Bowl XLI. The Saints entered the game with a 13–3 record for the 2009 regular season, compared to the Colts' 14–2 record. In the playoff games, both teams placed first in their conferences, marking the first time since Super Bowl XXVIII (16 years earlier) that both number-one seeds reached the Super Bowl. The Colts entered the Super Bowl off victories over the Baltimore Ravens and New York Jets, while the Saints advanced after defeating the previous year's Super Bowl runner–up, the Arizona Cardinals, and then overcoming the Minnesota Vikings in the NFC Championship. It was also the first time both teams started with a 13-game winning streak. This game would also mark the last Super Bowl appearance for both the Colts and Saints as of the 2025 NFL season.

The Saints were behind 10–6 at halftime of Super Bowl XLIV. During a play many consider the turning point of the game, Thomas Morstead kicked off the second half with a surprise onside kick. The Saints recovered the kick and soon got their first lead of the game with Pierre Thomas's 16-yard touchdown reception. The Colts responded with Joseph Addai's 4-yard touchdown run to regain the lead at 17–13. The Saints then scored 18 unanswered points, including Tracy Porter's 74-yard interception return for a touchdown, to clinch the victory. Saints quarterback Drew Brees, who completed 32 of 39 passes for 288 yards and two touchdowns, was named the Super Bowl MVP. His 32 completions tied a Super Bowl record set by Tom Brady in Super Bowl XXXVIII. The Saints' win was seen as a major morale boost for the city of New Orleans following the devastation caused by Hurricane Katrina in 2005. However, the game would later become controversial by the New Orleans Saints bounty scandal, when the NFL determined in 2012 that the Saints operated a slush fund between the 2009 and 2011 seasons to pay out bounties to their players for injuring their opponents.

The live broadcast of the game on CBS was watched by an average U.S. audience of 106.5 million viewers, making it then the most-watched Super Bowl. The National Anthem was sung by American Idol season 4 winner Carrie Underwood, and the halftime show featured the British rock band The Who. Super Bowl XLIV was the last Super Bowl to have a uniquely designed logo as its predecessors had: starting with Super Bowl XLV, the logo was permanently settled to bear the Vince Lombardi Trophy and the Roman numerals denoting the edition of the game (except for Super Bowl 50, which used Arabic numerals).

== Background ==
=== Host selection process ===
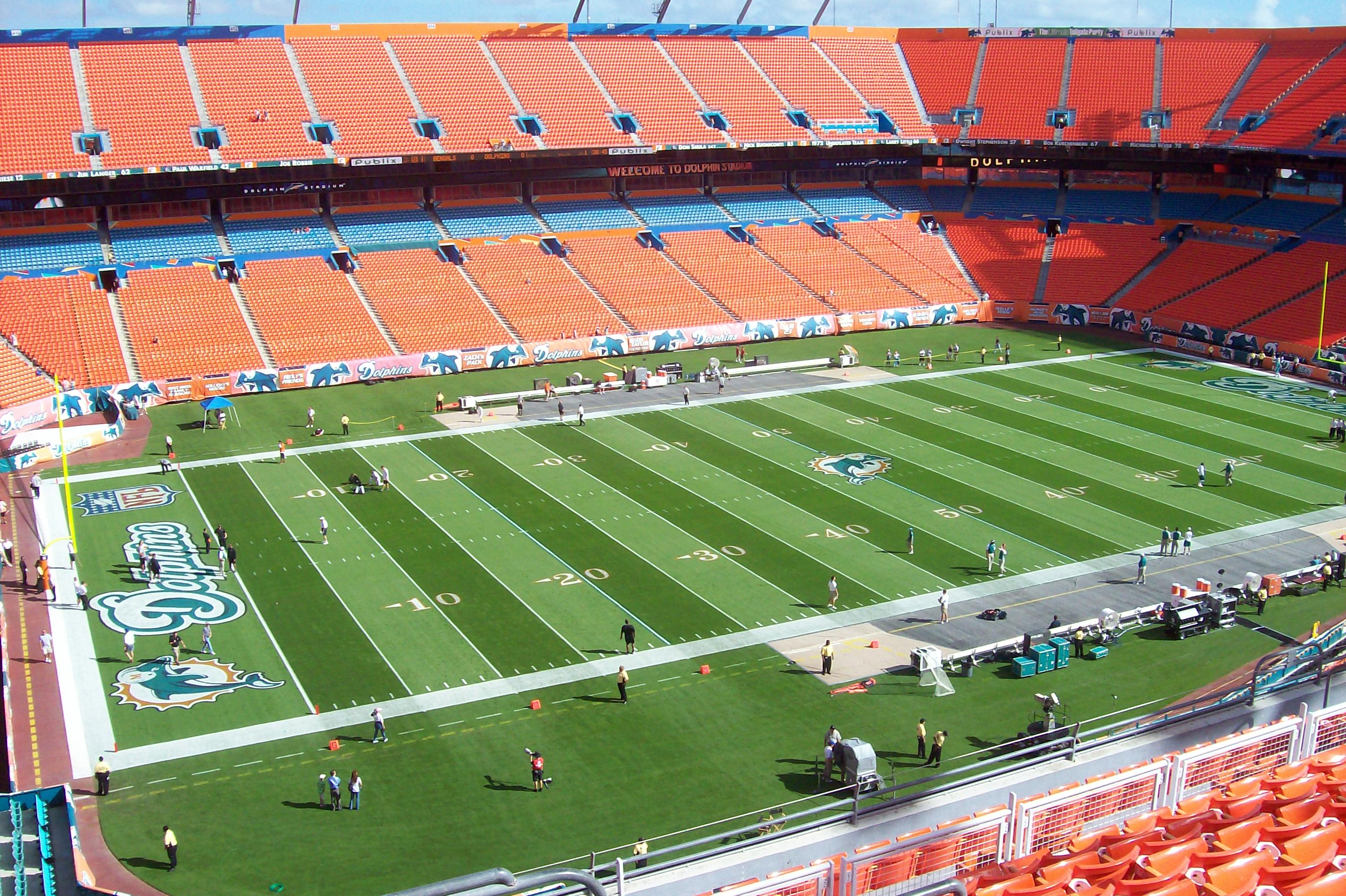
The then-named Sun Life Stadium, the venue of Super Bowl XLIV

NFL owners initially voted to award Super Bowl XLIV to West Side Stadium in Manhattan, New York City, during their March 23, 2005 meeting in Kapalua, Hawaii. West Side Stadium was a proposed retractable roof stadium which was to be the new home of the New York Jets, and the centerpiece of New York City's bid for the 2012 Summer Olympics. No other cities were considered at the time, and owners overwhelming voted 31–1 in favor of the New York City site. After an unsuccessful effort (by a different group) to land either XLI or XLII at Giants Stadium, the New York area was assigned XLIV on a 'conditional basis', contingent on securing funding and completing construction of the new facility. The NFL even agreed to waive their rule that prohibited a stadium from hosting a Super Bowl during its first year of operation.

The plans for West Side Stadium faced stiff local opposition, and was controversial since it would include a substantial amount of public financing. The total price tag of the stadium had ballooned to nearly $2 billion. New York State Assembly Speaker Sheldon Silver vowed to veto stadium funding, and Cablevision (then-owners of Madison Square Garden) lobbied heavily against its construction. On June 6, 2005, New York state officials declined to approve $400 million in public funds for stadium construction. On the same day, the IOC released their evaluations of the 2012 Olympic host bids, describing New York's bid as positive, but stated that the new stadium was "essential to the hosting the Games". On July 6, New York lost out on hosting the Olympics, finishing fourth in the IOC's balloting. Lacking the necessary funding, and without the Olympics as an anchor, the plans for West Side Stadium were cancelled. In August 2005, the NFL re-opened the bidding for XLIV, inviting the losing candidates from XLIII to resubmit and/or amend their previous proposals. Atlanta (Georgia Dome), Houston (Reliant Stadium), and Miami (Dolphins Stadium), the three cities that lost out to Tampa for XLIII, all submitted bids.

The Atlanta host committee, led by Falcons owner Arthur Blank, once again made an aggressive bid for the host duties. Blank reiterated his promise of $150 million for renovations to the Georgia Dome, and agreed to surrender half of the stadium's suites to the league. However, the lack of stadium parking, and the ice storm of XXXIV were still negatives in several owners' minds. Houston's bid was spearheaded by Texans owner Bob McNair. Houston possessed the newest stadium, but some owners were said to be unhappy with McNair's role as chairman of the NFL's revenue committee. Miami sweetened their bid with the promise of a yacht for each NFL owner. This time around, the three host committees did not make long form presentations. Instead, one representative from each city would be permitted to deliver a five-minute speech to recap and re-summarize their proposals.

The league scheduled the vote for October 6, 2005, during the mid-season owners meeting in Detroit. The vote was arranged for a maximum of three rounds. A city receiving 3/4 of the votes during any round would win outright. If no city received the necessary votes (24 of 32) during the first round, the last place vote-getter would be eliminated, and the process repeated. If the third round was reached, the vote would change to a simple majority (17 of 32). Houston was eliminated on the first ballot. Neither Miami nor Atlanta received enough votes in the second round, so the third round was decided by simple majority. Miami won the vote, but the final tally was kept confidential. By the time the game was played, the stadium's name had been changed once again, this time to Sun Life Stadium.

This was the tenth time the Super Bowl would be held in the Miami area, the most ever for a single city at the time. The game was played in the Miami Orange Bowl five times (II, III, V, X, XIII), while Dolphins Stadium had hosted the game four times (XXIII, XXIX, XXXIII, XLI). With Tampa hosting XLIII, this game marked the third time that consecutive Super Bowls have been played in the same state (II–III, XXI–XXII, and XLIII–XLIV). With Miami already slated to host XLI, they would be hosting two Super Bowls in a four-year span, but this would be the final Super Bowl played at the stadium before substantial renovations were made in 2015–2016. Following the game, the league threatened to take the stadium out of consideration for future Super Bowls until major upgrades were completed. It would not host another Super Bowl for ten years (LIV).

=== Pro Bowl changes ===
The 2010 Pro Bowl was played on January 31, during the off-week between the conference championships and the Super Bowl, breaking with the precedent of scheduling the game for the Sunday after the Super Bowl. The game also changed venues from Aloha Stadium in Honolulu, Hawaii, where it had been held since 1979, to Sun Life Stadium in Miami (the same city and stadium hosting the Super Bowl itself). Fourteen players from the Super Bowl participants, seven from each team, had been selected but were unable to participate due to the change. The new schedule took advantage of the bye week given to the conference champions to rest and prepare for the Super Bowl. The Pro Bowl returned to Honolulu the following season and remained there until 2015, when it was played in Glendale, Arizona, a week before Super Bowl XLIX, also in Glendale. The game returned to Honolulu in 2016, and beginning in 2017 was played in Orlando permanently. This, however, changed again in 2020, when the league announced that the 2021 Pro Bowl would be played at the new Allegiant Stadium in Las Vegas.

The move also meant that the Pro Bowl, which was won by the AFC by a score of 41–34, would avoid competing against the 2010 NBA All-Star Game, the second full day of competition in the 2010 Winter Olympics, and the 52nd running of the Daytona 500, as would have been the case had the game been played on February 14 per its traditional post-Super Bowl scheduling.

== Teams ==
=== New Orleans Saints ===
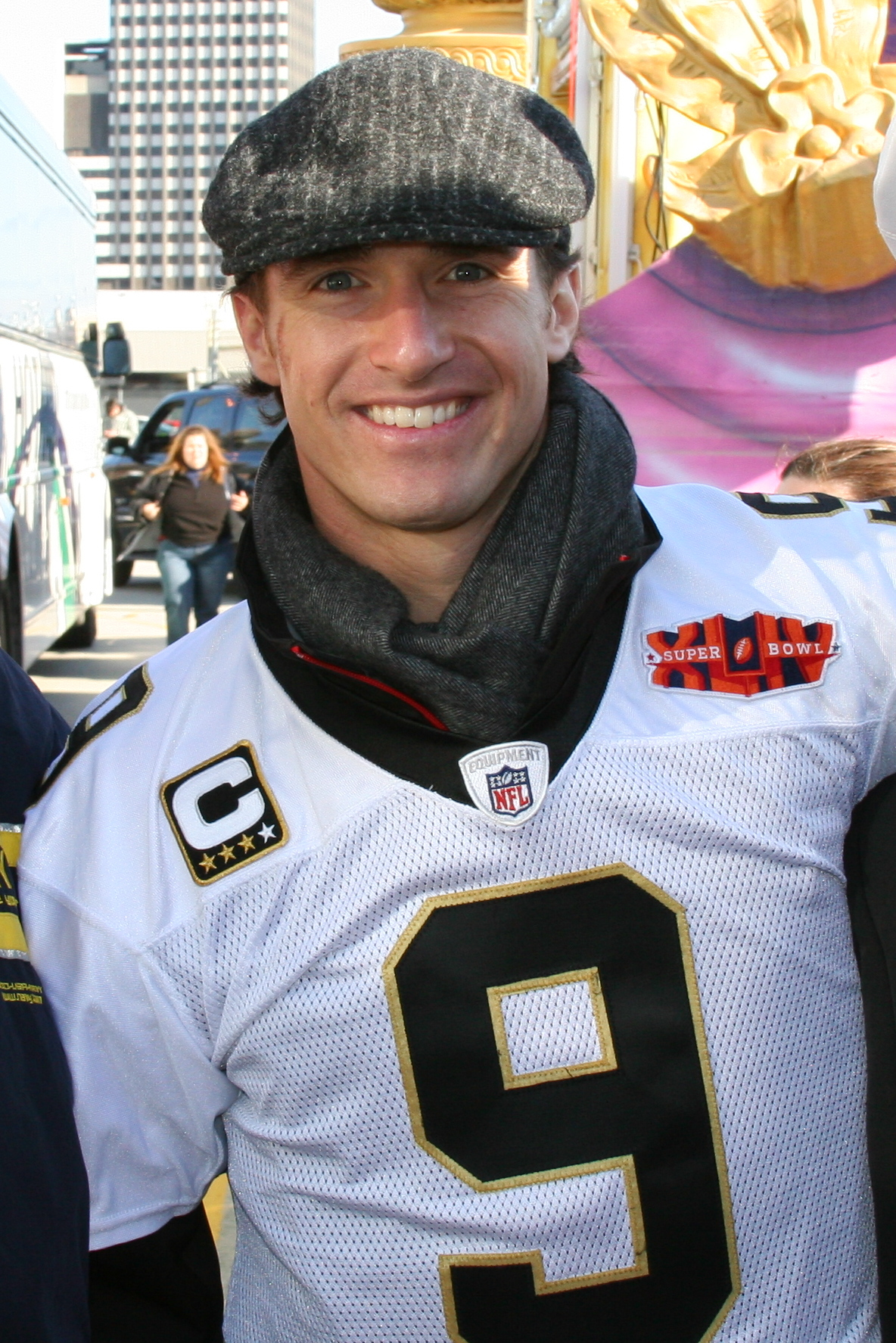
QB Drew Brees in 2010

The New Orleans Saints finished the season with an NFC best 13–3 record and went on to advance to the first Super Bowl in their 43 years as an NFL team. After joining the NFL in 1967, it took them 21 years to record their first winning season and another 13 years after that to win their first playoff game. It came in 2000 with a dethroning of the defending champion St. Louis Rams, at the beginning of a decade which concluded with Super Bowl XLIV. Five years later, the New Orleans area suffered another setback when the Louisiana Superdome was devastated with the rest of the city by Hurricane Katrina, forcing them to play all of their home games in 2005 elsewhere as they finished with a 3–13 record (see Effect of Hurricane Katrina on the New Orleans Saints). But in the off-season, the team's fortunes began to turn. First, they signed free agent quarterback Drew Brees, who would go on to throw for more passing yards than any other quarterback over the next four seasons. They also drafted multi-talented Heisman Trophy winning running back Reggie Bush, receiver Marques Colston, and guard Jahri Evans, three players who would become major contributors on the Saints' offense. The following season, New Orleans improved to 10–6 and advanced to the NFC title game for the first time, which they lost to the Chicago Bears. Although they failed to make the playoffs over the next two seasons, they continued to sign new talent, and by 2009 they were ready to make another run at the Super Bowl.

The Saints' offense led the NFL in scoring, averaging just under 32 points per game. Brees finished the season as the NFL's top rated quarterback (109.6), completing an NFL-record 70.6% of his passes for 4,338 yards and 34 touchdowns, with just 11 interceptions. His top target was Colston, who caught 70 passes for 1,074 yards and 9 touchdowns, but he had plenty of other weapons, such as receivers Devery Henderson (51 receptions) and Robert Meachem (45), along with tight ends Jeremy Shockey (48) and Dave Thomas (35). With fullback Heath Evans out of action due to injury for most of the season, Dave Thomas often lined up as a fullback, with tackle Zach Strief serving as an extra blocker on short yardage plays. The ground attack was led by running backs Pierre Thomas and Mike Bell. Thomas rushed for 793 yards and caught 39 passes for 302, while Bell added 654 yards on the ground. Bush was also a major contributor, rushing for 390 yards (with a 5.6 yards per carry average), catching 47 passes for 335 yards, and adding another 130 yards returning punts. New Orleans also had a strong offensive line with three Pro Bowl selections: guard Jahri Evans, center Jonathan Goodwin, and tackle Jon Stinchcomb.

Defensive lineman Will Smith led the team in sacks with 13. Another big weapon on defense was linebacker Jonathan Vilma, who led the team with 87 tackles and intercepted three passes. The Saints' secondary was led by 12-year veteran safety Darren Sharper, who recorded 9 interceptions and set an NFL record by returning them for 376 yards and three touchdowns. Cornerback Tracy Porter was also effective, recording 49 tackles and 4 picks with one touchdown.

The Saints started out the season strong, winning their first 13 games. But then they became the first 13–0 team ever to lose their last three games of the year. After losing their 14th game to the Dallas Cowboys 24–17, they suffered a narrow loss to the Tampa Bay Buccaneers (20–17 in overtime) after Garrett Hartley missed a potential game-winning field goal. With the team's playoff seed clinched, head coach Sean Payton chose to rest Brees and other starters in the final game of the season, resulting in a 23–10 loss to the Carolina Panthers. The string of defeats cast a cloud over the team's postseason chances. Still, they clinched the No. 1 NFC playoff seed and scored 76 points in their two playoff wins en route to their first ever Super Bowl.

=== Indianapolis Colts ===
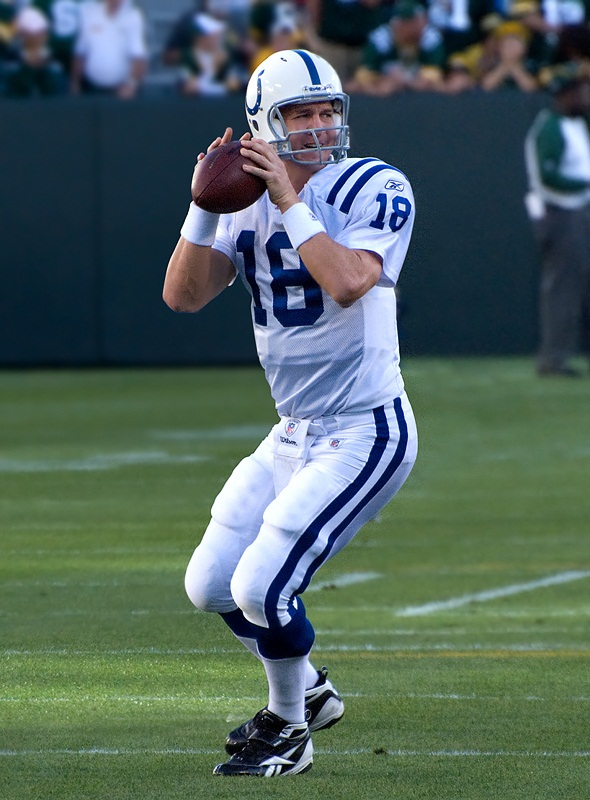
QB Peyton Manning was voted the league's MVP

Indianapolis had the NFL-best 14–2 record, winning seven games by less than a touchdown, on their way to earning their second Super Bowl appearance in the last four years. Once again, the Colts boasted a powerful offense led by 10-time Pro Bowl quarterback Peyton Manning, who threw for over 4,500 yards and 33 touchdowns during the season, with only 16 interceptions, earning him a 99.9 passer rating and a league record fourth National Football League Most Valuable Player Award. Under the protection of Pro Bowl center Jeff Saturday and the rest of the line, Manning had been sacked just 13 times during the regular season, the fewest in the NFL. His top targets were veteran receiver Reggie Wayne and tight end Dallas Clark, who both recorded 100 receptions and 10 touchdowns. Wayne led the team with 1,260 yards, while Clark was second with 1,106. Manning also had other reliable targets, such as recently drafted receivers Austin Collie (60 receptions for 676 yards and 7 touchdowns) and Pierre Garçon (47 receptions for 765 yards and 4 touchdowns). Running back Joseph Addai led the Colts' ground game with 821 rushing yards and 10 touchdowns, while also catching 51 passes for another 336 yards and 3 scores.

Indianapolis' defensive line was led by Pro Bowl defensive ends Robert Mathis and Dwight Freeney. Freeney led the team with 13.5 sacks, while Mathis added 9.5 sacks and forced 5 fumbles. Behind them, the Colts had a solid corps of linebackers featuring Clint Session and Gary Brackett, who each recorded 80 tackles. Pro Bowl safety Antoine Bethea led the secondary with 70 tackles and four interceptions.

Under their new coach Jim Caldwell, the Colts started off the season with 14 consecutive wins before suffering their first loss to the New York Jets, 29–15, a game in which Caldwell made the controversial decision to rest his starters after the team took a slim lead rather than keep them in to play for a chance at a 16–0 season. Indianapolis finished the season at 14–2 following a loss to the Buffalo Bills, in which they rested their starters and went on to advance to the Super Bowl, making them perfect in all their games in which their starters played all four-quarters.

Caldwell led the Colts to the Super Bowl the season after Tony Dungy retired, just like in Tampa Bay when Jon Gruden led the Tampa Bay Buccaneers to Super Bowl XXXVII after Dungy was fired. Senior offensive line coach Howard Mudd retired following the game.

=== Playoffs ===
The Saints started off their playoff run with a dominating 45–14 win over the defending NFC champion Arizona Cardinals. The Cardinals were coming off a 51–45 overtime win over the Green Bay Packers in which they racked up 531 yards against a defense ranked second in the league in total yards allowed. However, although the Cardinals scored on their first play of the game, the Saints dominated the Cardinals with 35 points in the first half. First, Lynell Hamilton scored on a 1-yard run. Then, Sharper recovered a fumble from the Cardinals, setting up Brees' touchdown pass to Shockey. Following a punt, Bush scored on a franchise playoff record 46-yard run. In the second quarter, Brees added two more touchdown passes, one to Henderson on a flea flicker and the other to Colston that was set up by a Will Smith interception, giving them a 35–14 first half lead before adding 10 more points in the second half on a Hartley field goal and Bush's 83-yard punt return. Bush racked up 217 all-purpose yards, while Brees threw for 247 yards and three touchdowns.

Their opponent in the NFC Championship Game was the Minnesota Vikings, led by 11-time Pro Bowl quarterback Brett Favre, who had thrown four touchdown passes in their divisional round win over the Dallas Cowboys. Even though the Saints' offense could only muster 257 total yards, their defense made up for it by forcing five turnovers. Additionally, the Saints outgained the Vikings in punt and kickoff return yards 166 to 50. The key play of the game occurred late in the fourth quarter with the score tied 28–28 and the Vikings driving for a potential game-winning field goal. With less than a minute left, they reached the Saints 33-yard line. But after two runs for no gain and a penalty that pushed them back to the 38, Porter picked off a pass from Favre to send the game into overtime. After the Saints won the coin toss, Pierre Thomas's 40-yard kickoff return set up a 10-play, 39-yard drive that ended with a game winning 40-yard field goal by Hartley, sending the Saints to their first ever Super Bowl.

The Colts' first opponent was the Baltimore Ravens, a 9–7 squad that had advanced to the divisional round by defeating the New England Patriots 33–14, forcing four turnovers from their All-Pro quarterback Tom Brady. Against the Colts, however, all they could manage was a field goal on their opening drive. Indianapolis built up a 17–3 first half lead with a Matt Stover field goal and Manning's touchdown passes to Wayne and Collie. In the second half, the Colts survived two interceptions from Ravens safety Ed Reed on one drive, one of which Reed fumbled, and the other which was called back by a penalty. Stover, who spent 18 years with the Modell franchise, finished the drive with his second field goal to make final score 20–3, as their defense put the game away by forcing two consecutive turnovers.

Their next opponent was in the AFC Championship Game against the New York Jets, who had made the playoffs in part due to Caldwell's decision to bench his starters in their Week 16 meeting. This time, the Colts would have to mount a comeback, as the Jets built up a 17–6 first half lead. Yet the Colts would step up to the challenge, scoring 24 unanswered points. First, Manning completed three passes to Collie for 80 yards, the last one a 16-yard touchdown completion to cut the score to 17–13 at the end of the half. Manning added two more touchdown passes in the second half, one to Garçon and one to Clark, and Stover added a 21-yard field goal to close out the scoring. Manning finished the game with 377 passing yards and three touchdowns, while Garçon and Collie had over 100 receiving yards each.

This was the first Super Bowl matchup in which both teams had a first-round bye since Super Bowl XXXIX. All four of the Super Bowls in-between had one team that played all three rounds (two of which were wild card teams), with three of those teams (including the Colts in Super Bowl XLI) winning it all.

== Broadcasting ==
=== Television ===
==== United States ====
The game was televised live in the United States on CBS, capping CBS's 50th season of NFL coverage (1956–93; 1998–present). This was the 17th Super Bowl telecast for CBS, the largest total among the "big four" US television networks. CBS had also broadcast the previous Super Bowl held in South Florida (XLI). Play-by-play announcer Jim Nantz and color commentator Phil Simms were in the broadcast booth, with Steve Tasker and Solomon Wilcots serving as sideline reporters. The game was preceded by The Super Bowl Today, a four-hour pregame show hosted by James Brown and featuring analysts Dan Marino, Boomer Esiason, Shannon Sharpe and Bill Cowher along with several other commentators, which started at 2 p.m. EST. A kickoff show for the game aired from 6 p.m. EST to 6:28 p.m. EST. A Spanish language broadcast was aired on the second audio program, with play-by-play announcer Armando Quintero and color analyst Benny Ricardo.

With an average U.S. audience of 106.5 million viewers, this was the third most-watched Super Bowl, trailing only the 111 million viewers for Super Bowl XLV the following year and 111.3 million viewers for Super Bowl XLVI. At the time, it was the most-watched program of any kind in American television history, beating the 27-year-long record previously held by the final episode of M*A*S*H, "Goodbye, Farewell and Amen", which coincidentally, also aired on CBS, and was watched by 105.97 million viewers. An estimated 153.4 million total viewers watched all or part of the game. The game drew a national Nielsen rating of 45.0 with a 68 share, the highest for a Super Bowl since Super Bowl XXX in 1996 (46.0/68). The telecast drew a 56.3 rating in New Orleans and a 54.2 rating in Indianapolis, first and fourth respectively among local markets.

===== Advertising =====
====== Notable returnees and absences ======
Perennial Super Bowl advertisers Anheuser–Busch InBev and CareerBuilder stated their commitment to advertise in Super Bowl XLIV, showing eight and two different spots during the game, respectively. A 30-second spot cost US $2.8 million with several advertisers getting discounts, down from the previous year's $3 million. All advertising slots were sold out on February 1, 2010, six days before the game. Pepsi-Cola had previously stated their commitment to advertise, but then said they would not be buying any commercial time, marking the first time in 23 years that Pepsi did not run an ad during the Super Bowl itself. FedEx also stated that they would not buy ad time. Both Pepsi and FedEx are official NFL sponsors. Coca-Cola and Dr Pepper Snapple Group capitalized on Pepsi's absence by buying ads in the game; Dr Pepper's ad featured KISS performing "Calling Dr. Love", while one of Coca-Cola's three ads featured Montgomery Burns (of Fox's The Simpsons) losing everything he owns. Also for the second straight year, one of the Big Three American automobile makers – General Motors – did not have a commercial in the game. Ford had one commercial for the Ford Edge featuring Mike Rowe. Chrysler's Dodge brand did advertise this year for its Dodge Charger, narrated by Michael C. Hall.

====== What aired ======
Frito-Lay's Doritos brand, in turn owned by PepsiCo, had four consumer-created advertisements scheduled. The first three ads – running in the first quarter – featured a sly dog using an anti-bark collar to his advantage to steal a man's Doritos, a fast-handed boy defending his Doritos and his mother from a potential suitor, and a man faking his death for free Doritos. The fourth ad, featuring an angry gym rat who was overprotective for his Doritos being stolen, aired in the fourth quarter. Had three of the ads topped the USA Today Super Bowl Ad Meter rankings, the commercial's creators would have won a total of US$5 million ($1 million for first, $600,000 for second and $400,000 for third, plus a $1 million bonus for each of the three finalists). The previous year, Joe and David Herbert's "Free Doritos" ad topped the survey and won $1 million. The United States Census Bureau spent $2.5million on a 30-second spot, directed by noted independent filmmaker Christopher Guest, for the 2010 United States census, which urged Americans to answer its questionnaires that will be sent out in the next few weeks. McDonald's aired a commercial, updating a famous ad from the early 1990s, in which NBA superstars LeBron James and Dwight Howard (replacing Michael Jordan and Larry Bird) play an otherworldly game of H-O-R-S-E, with a McDonald's lunch going to the winner – however, they soon look over and see that Bird has helped himself to it. Mars Chocolate returned three years after its controversial Snickers ad that was protested by gay groups with two men kissing one another that was pulled one day following the game (see Super Bowl XLI: Commercials). The commercial – winner of the annual Ad Meter survey – featured veteran actors Betty White and Abe Vigoda playing full-contact backyard football.

The rest of the Top Five:

2. The aforementioned Doritos's amateur ad featuring a dog strapped to an anti-bark collar getting revenge on a teasing man.
3. A Bud Light ad with a house completely made of beer cans of the sponsor's product.
4. A Budweiser ad featuring the relationship between a Clydesdale and a Longhorn steer.
5. Coca-Cola's man walking through an African savanna in the middle of the night.

The YouTube Top Five of their "2010 Ad Blitz" were:

1. Another Doritos ad that showed a kid slapping his mom's suitor.
2. E-Trade's baby with his girlfriend.
3. The Doritos dog collar ad.
4. The Snickers Betty White/Abe Vigoda ad.
5. The Doritos commercial with the gym rat.

ADBOWL results reflected the following ranking:

1. Snickers: You're Not You – Betty White & Abe Vigoda
2. Doritos: House Rules
3. Volkswagen: "Punch Dub" Game
4. Google: Parisian Love
5. Doritos: Underdog

Internet domain registrar GoDaddy, which created a racy ad the year after the Super Bowl XXXVIII halftime show controversy, bought two ads in the Super Bowl for the sixth consecutive year. Advertising Age reported that Paramount Pictures bought a Super Bowl spot for the upcoming films Iron Man 2 and The Last Airbender. A trailer for the HBO miniseries The Pacific was also aired.

Other advertisers for 2010 included Homeaway Inc., paying tribute to National Lampoon's Vacation with their stars Chevy Chase and Beverly D'Angelo, and Diamond Foods, who returned to promote both its Emerald Nuts brand and Pop Secret popcorn, which they bought from General Mills two years before. Boost Mobile aired a special ad, celebrating the 25th Anniversary of The Super Bowl Shuffle, featuring many of the 1985 Chicago Bears to advertise their US$50 per month service. Also, in a CBS-produced promo for the Late Show with David Letterman, the eponymous host and his longtime talk show rival, Jay Leno, appeared together with Oprah Winfrey.

====== Controversies ======
Three advertisers in particular raised eyebrows with their choice to advertise during the Super Bowl. One new advertiser, Focus on the Family, aired a commercial featuring 2007 Heisman Trophy winner Tim Tebow and his mother that elicited criticism from some women's groups who demanded CBS cancel the ad because they claimed it would be divisive, under the impression that it would mention Tebow's mother was advised, for health issues, to abort her son Tim, but she chose to give birth to him. In the first quarter, CBS aired the advertisement, which had not been pre-released to the public. Per a statement released earlier, the ad did not mention the topic of abortion explicitly.

One proposed sponsor, ManCrunch, a gay dating site that bills itself as a place "where many many many men come out to play", had expressed interest in purchasing a 30-second advertisement. The ManCrunch advertisement would have depicted a male Green Bay Packers fan and a male Minnesota Vikings fan reaching into the same bowl of potato chips at the same time and, after a brief pause, begin to passionately kiss. ManCrunch's ad, which has since been released to the public, was initially put on a waiting list before the network outright rejected it due to it violating CBS's broadcast standards. ManCrunch immediately accused CBS of discrimination. Some observers suspect that their advertisement was an attempt at ambush marketing and free publicity. Another ad that was rejected by CBS for failure to meet standards was for the texting service kgb, which focuses on two men with CGI-enhanced images bent over with their heads in their posteriors, while an actor, Sean Gunn, portraying an agent stated that "They had their head up their [backsides]". kgb instead aired an ad with two people who had to find the Japanese word for "I surrender" before being run over by a sumo wrestler. Another ad for Bud Light which was rejected showed workers stripping down for a charity clothes drive in exchange for free beer. All of the rejected ads were shown on YouTube.

Among other rejected or modified ads were one for Electronic Arts' Dante's Inferno, which had to be edited for content (the closing phrase, originally intended to read "go to Hell", was replaced with "Hell awaits"), and GoDaddy's originally planned advertisement. Career Builder's ad, showing people dressed too casually for "Casual Friday" and a Dockers ad to promote a free pair of their pants with men in shirts but sans trousers aired back-to-back early in the second quarter.

An E*TRADE advertisement, continuing their theme of talking babies on a Web cam, featured a boyfriend-stealing, "milkaholic" baby girl named "Lindsay." Actress Lindsay Lohan, who has a history of alcoholism and was noted for having tried in the early 2000s to date popular young men who were already dating other women, attempted to sue E*TRADE over the advertisement, seeking US$100 million in damages, under the impression that the advertisement defamed her via subliminal messaging and violated her personality rights. E*TRADE denied the allegations and stated the name "Lindsay" came from a member of the accounting staff. Lohan and E*TRADE settled the lawsuit in September 2010; the terms were confidential.

==== International ====
Viewers worldwide were able to watch on the following channels:

- North America:

- Canada: CTV (English) and RDS (French) (subject to simsub due to CRTC mandates all cable/satellite providers to replace the American feed.)
- Mexico: Televisa, TV Azteca (broadcasting in HD).
- Belize: Tropical Vision Limited, Great Belize Television.
- Costa Rica: ESPN, Fox Sports Latin America.
- Guatemala: ESPN, Fox Sports Latin America.
- Panama: ESPN, Fox Sports Latin America.

- Oceania

- Australia: Fox Sports 3, ESPN, Channel Ten and One HD
- New Zealand: Sky Sport 2 and ESPN

- Europe:

- Austria: Puls 4 started at 23:30 (CET)
- Belgium: Prime Sport
- Denmark: TV3+/TV3+ HD starting at 22:00 (CET)
- Europe: ESPN America.
- Finland: Nelonen Sport Pro and on Viasat Sport/Viasat Sport HD started at 00:00 (CET)
- France: W9
- Germany: ARD Das Erste started at 23:35 (CET)
- Greece : Nova Sports started 01:30 (EET)
- Hungary: Sport 1
- Ireland and United Kingdom: BBC One and on Sky Sports 1 and HD 1 at 10:55 pm and 11 pm (GMT)
- Italy: Rai Sport Più started at 22:00 (CET), Rai Due started at 00:15 (CET), broadcast also in HD in selected areas.
- Norway: NRK1 started at 23:15 (CET) and on Viasat Sport/Viasat Sport HD
- Poland: Polsat Sport/Polsat Sport HD started at 00:00 (CET)
- Portugal: SportTV 2 and on SportTV HD started at 23:00 (WET)
- Romania: Sport 1 started 01:00 (EET)
- Russia: NTV Plus
- Slovenia: Šport TV 1
- Spain: Canal+
- Sweden: TV6 No longer available on TV6. Super Bowl is broadcast on TV10 and on Viasat Sport/Viasat Sport HD started at 00:00 (CET).
- Turkey: Fox Sports [Turkey] Spormax HD started 01.00 (EET)

- South America:

- Argentina: ESPN
- Brazil: ESPN and Esporte Interativo
- Chile and Peru: ESPN, Fox Sports Latin America
- Paraguay: ESPN
- Uruguay: ESPN

- Asia:

- China: CCTV-5, G-Sports, Guangdong Sports, Sina TV
- Hong Kong: ATV
- Japan: NHK, NTV

=== Radio ===
On radio, Westwood One had the national English-language broadcast rights to the game in the United States and Canada. Marv Albert (play-by-play) and Boomer Esiason (color commentator) called the game for the network; it was the last broadcast Albert would do for Westwood One, due to his desire to focus on his basketball coverage duties. The teams' flagship stations also carried the game with their local announcers: WLHK-FM and WFNI-AM in Indianapolis (with Bob Lamey and Will Wolford announcing) and WWL-FM/AM in New Orleans (with Jim Henderson and Hokie Gajan announcing). The Saints' radio broadcast on WWL-AM was available throughout much of the United States, since WWL is a Class A clear channel station. Univision Radio aired a Spanish-language feed for Hispanophone American listeners (with Clemson Smith-Muñiz and David Crommett announcing).

Sirius XM Satellite Radio carried 14 game feeds in ten languages to Sirius subscribers, as well as to XM subscribers with the "Best of Sirius" package. In addition to the four US feeds mentioned above, Sirius carried the following international feeds:

- United Kingdom: BBC Radio 5 Live (English; Arlo White announcing)
- Spain: Canal+ Spain (Spanish)
- Russia: NTV Plus (Russian)
- France: W9 (French)
- Japan: NHK (Japanese)
- Germany: ARD (German)
- Italy: RAI (Italian)
- Hungary: Sport1 (Hungarian)
- Netherlands: Prime Sport (Dutch)
- Denmark: Viasat (Danish)

FieldPass, the subscription Internet radio service provided by the league at NFL.com, also carried most of these feeds. Due to contractual restrictions, only Sirius XM and FieldPass were permitted to carry the local team broadcasts along with WLHK, WFNI and WWL, with the teams' other network radio affiliates instead airing the Westwood One feed.

== Entertainment and other ceremonies ==
=== Pregame ===
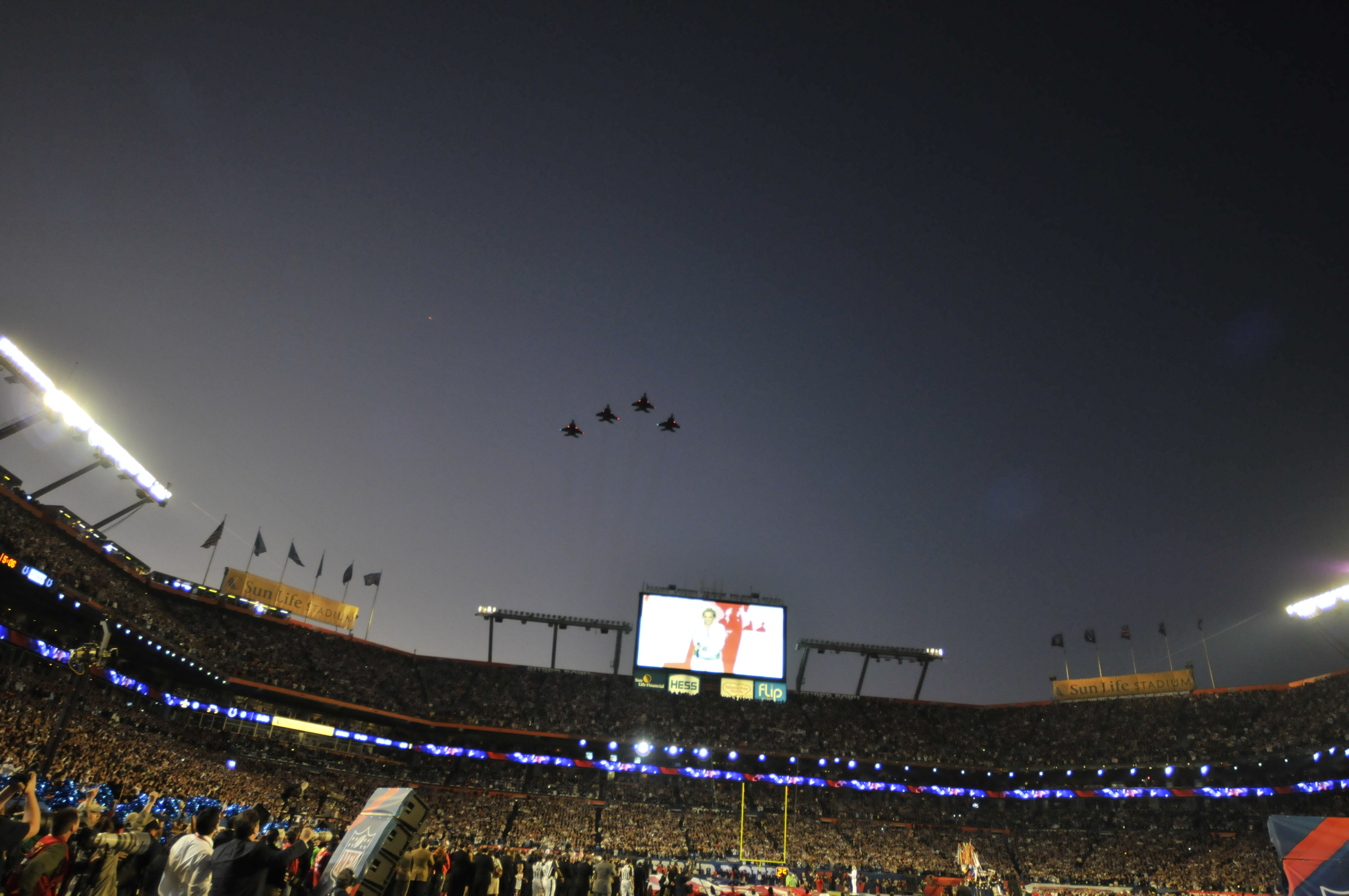
Aircraft of the 125th Fighter Wing perform a flyover while Carrie Underwood sings the National Anthem.

Barenaked Ladies played the Super Bowl Saturday Night event with O.A.R. and Robert Randolph and the Family Band. Chris Daughtry, Steve Winwood and Queen Latifah performed during the Super Bowl pre-game tailgate party, which started at 2:00 p.m.

Queen Latifah sang "America the Beautiful" and Carrie Underwood sang "The Star-Spangled Banner". Underwood's performance marked the third straight year that an alumnus of American Idol has been invited to perform the national anthem, joining Jordin Sparks at Super Bowl XLII and Jennifer Hudson a year later. Translation of both songs into American Sign Language was provided by Kinesha Battles, a student at the Florida School for the Deaf and Blind. The anthem was concluded with a flyover of four F-15C Eagles from Florida Air National Guard's 125th Fighter Wing.

To commemorate the 15th anniversary of the San Francisco 49ers' fifth Super Bowl victory, which took place at this stadium, Jerry Rice, who had also been MVP of Super Bowl XXIII, another Super Bowl played at this stadium, joined the coin toss ceremonies. Rice had just been named to the Pro Football Hall of Fame Class of 2010. The rest of the class – Rickey Jackson, Dick LeBeau, Floyd Little, Russ Grimm, John Randle, and Emmitt Smith – were named the day before. The Saints won the coin toss, marking the 13th straight Super Bowl the NFC won the toss (the Cardinals won the toss in Super Bowl XLIII but elected to defer to the second half, giving the Steelers the ball to open the game). The coin used for the toss was flown into space on STS-129 before the game.

=== Halftime ===
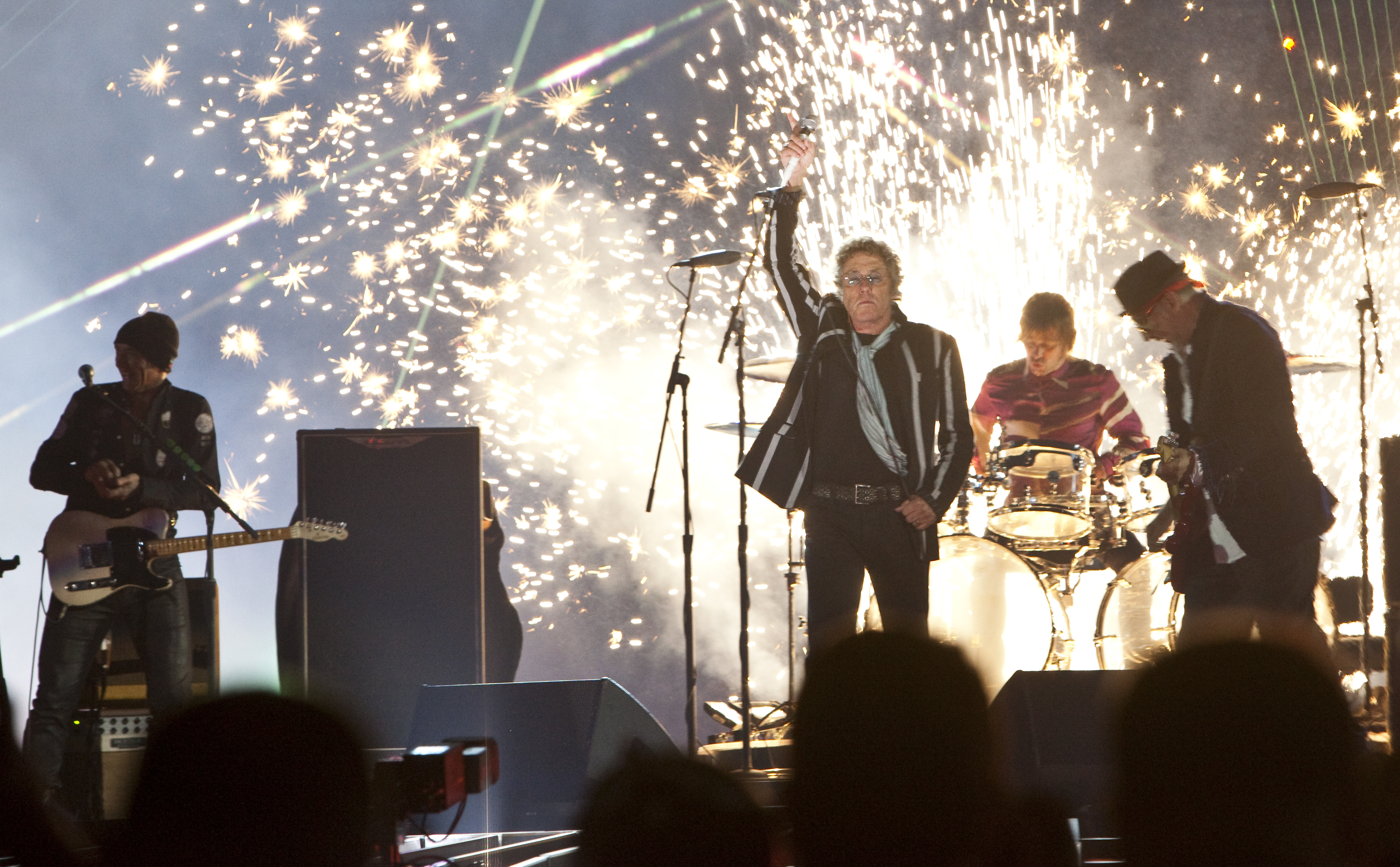
The Who performing during the halftime show

The Who performed at the Super Bowl XLIV halftime show. The band played a medley of their hits, consisting of "Pinball Wizard", "Baba O'Riley", "Who Are You", "See Me, Feel Me", and "Won't Get Fooled Again". For the first time since the Super Bowl XXXIV halftime show, there was no crowd of fans surrounding the halftime stage. This performance was also released as downloadable content for the Rock Band series, named "The Who Super Bowl S-mashup".

=== Merchandising ===
Retailers had ordered much more New Orleans Saints merchandise prior to the game than they had ordered Colts merchandise. The NFL estimated that US$100million worth of Super Bowl merchandise would be sold.

== Game summary ==
External videos
- Full game broadcast on CBS on YouTube

=== First quarter ===
As the designated home team in the annual rotation between AFC and NFC teams, the Colts elected to wear their home blue uniforms with white pants, while the Saints wore their road white uniforms with old gold pants.

The Saints won the coin toss and chose to receive, but their first possession resulted in a three-and-out and a punt.

The Colts' offense took the field for the first time, with the ball spotted at their own 27-yard line. They put together a 53-yard drive that featured two completions from quarterback Peyton Manning to tight end Dallas Clark, as well as a 14-yard reception by wide receiver Austin Collie on 3rd-and-7. The drive ended with a 38-yard field goal by kicker Matt Stover to give the Colts an early 3–0 lead. At 42 years old, Stover became the then oldest player in NFL history to participate in a Super Bowl, second to Tom Brady, who broke the record in 2021 when he won Super Bowl LV at the age of 43.

Wide receiver Courtney Roby returned the ensuing kickoff to the Saints' 26-yard line. Approaching the 25-yard line, Roby swooped into a dive and appeared to fumble the ball, but officials ruled that he was down by contact after taking a hit by Colts cornerback Tim Jennings. This time, the Saints managed to get a first down with a 16-yard completion from quarterback Drew Brees to running back Reggie Bush, but they were eventually forced to punt again. Thomas Morstead pinned the Colts back at their own 4-yard line with a 46-yard punt.

The Colts responded with an 11-play, 96-yard scoring drive, tying the record for the longest drive in Super Bowl history. Running back Joseph Addai rushed three times for 53 yards, while Manning completed three passes for 35 yards, the last one a 19-yard touchdown pass to wide receiver Pierre Garçon, increasing the Colts' lead to 10–0.

=== Second quarter ===
The Saints' next drive carried over from the previous quarter. Four completions by Drew Brees for 36 yards, as well as an unnecessary roughness penalty against linebacker Philip Wheeler, helped the Saints advance to the Colts' 22-yard line. On third down, However, Brees was sacked for a 7-yard loss by defensive end Dwight Freeney, forcing the Saints to settle for a 46-yard field goal from kicker Garrett Hartley. After scoring on their first two drives, the Colts were forced to punt for the first time when Pierre Garçon dropped a pass on third down. The Saints stormed down the field to set up 1st-and-goal at the Colts' 3-yard line, aided by Brees' two passes to wide receiver Marques Colston for 40 yards and a 21-yard reception by wide receiver Lance Moore. However, the Colts' defense stood their ground. After Moore was stopped for no gain by cornerback Kelvin Hayden, a false start penalty against offensive tackle Zach Strief pushed the Saints back to the 8-yard line. Running back Pierre Thomas picked up 7 yards to reach the 1-yard line, but the Saints ended up turning the ball over on downs when Thomas and running back Mike Bell failed to tie the game. The Colts ran three straight running plays in an effort to wind down the clock and go to halftime with a seven-point lead, but the Saints used up their first two timeouts and stopped the Colts from getting a first down. Following Bush's 4-yard punt return to his own 48, with 35 seconds and one timeout left to use in the half, Brees completed two passes to wide receiver Devery Henderson for 25 yards, and Hartley kicked a 44-yard field goal as time expired, cutting the Saints' deficit to 10–6.

=== Third quarter ===
The Colts were set to receive the ball to start the second half but were caught by surprise when the Saints executed a surprise onside kick. This was the first onside kick attempted before the fourth quarter in Super Bowl history, a play the Saints referred to as "The Ambush." Morstead kicked the ball to his left, and after traveling almost 15 yards, the ball bounced off the face-mask of Colts wide receiver Hank Baskett, who failed to recover the ball cleanly. Several players dove for the loose ball, creating a pile that took over a minute for the officiating crew to separate. When the dust finally cleared, Saints linebacker Jonathan Casillas was officially credited with the recovery on the 42-yard line, but he and a number of his teammates insisted that it was actually safety Chris Reis who came up with the ball. The Saints' offense took over and stormed down the field on an effective six-play, 58-yard drive in which they didn't face a single third down. Brees completed five consecutive passes for 51 yards on the drive and capped it off with a "check-down" pass on the right side to Pierre Thomas, who took it 16 yards for the first Saints touchdown of the game behind blocks from Henderson; offensive linemen Jonathan Goodwin, Jahri Evans, and Carl Nicks; fullback Kyle Eckel; and tight end Jeremy Shockey. The score gave the Saints their first lead of the game, the score being 13–10 at that point.

The Colts answered with a touchdown drive of their own, moving the ball 76 yards in 10 plays. Clark caught three passes from Manning for 45 yards, while Joseph Addai rushed three times for 19 yards, the last for a 4-yard touchdown, to put the Colts back in front with a 17–13 lead with only 6:15 remaining in the quarter. For the second time in Super Bowl history, both teams scored touchdowns on their initial possessions of the second half (the only other time occurring in Super Bowl XIV).

Addai's touchdown turned out to be the last Colts score, as the Saints took complete control of the game from then on. On the Saints' next possession, they reached the Colts' 29-yard line, and Hartley kicked his third field goal of the day, a 47-yarder, to cut the Saints' deficit to 17–16. In doing so, he became the first kicker in Super Bowl history to score three field goals of 40 or more yards in the same game (later matched by Jake Elliott in Super Bowl LIX).

This was the first one-point lead after the third quarter in Super Bowl history and second closest game after three quarters, behind Super Bowl XXXIX which was tied between the New England Patriots and Philadelphia Eagles.

=== Fourth quarter ===
The Colts responded with a drive to the Saints' 33-yard line, during which Manning completed a 17-yard pass to Garçon, then two passes to wide receiver Reggie Wayne for 24 (including one on 4th-and-2), but came up empty when Stover missed a 51-yard field goal attempt wide left, giving the ball back to the Saints with good field position on their own 41-yard line. Brees subsequently led the Saints on another touchdown drive featuring seven different players getting the ball (Robert Meachem, Pierre Thomas, Marques Colston, Devery Henderson, David Thomas, Reggie Bush, and Jeremy Shockey). Bush started off the drive with a 12-yard run, then Henderson caught a 6-yard pass on the Colts' 36-yard line. Following an 8-yard catch and run by Bush, Brees completed passes to Colston, wide receiver Robert Meachem, and tight end David Thomas, moving the ball to the 5-yard line. After a 3-yard run by Pierre Thomas, Brees threw a 2-yard touchdown pass to Shockey. Rather than settle for a six-point lead, and risk a potential Colts game-winning touchdown, the Saints chanced a two-point conversion. Moore caught a pass from Brees while standing at the edge of the end zone and attempted to pull the ball in over the goal line as he fell to the ground and rolled over on his head. The ball was kicked away from Moore's hands by cornerback Jacob Lacey, and the play was ruled an incomplete pass, prompting a coach's challenge from Sean Payton. After the review, the ruling on the field was overturned when it was determined that Moore maintained possession of the ball long enough and the ball had crossed the plane of the goal line for a successful conversion, putting the Saints back in front, 24–17, with 5:42 remaining in the game.

With a chance to tie the game, Manning led the Colts into Saints territory by completing two passes each to Garçon and Wayne for gains of 27 and 17 yards, respectively. However, cornerback Tracy Porter intercepted a pass by Manning at the Saints' 26-yard line for the game's only takeaway and returned it 74 yards for a touchdown, increasing the Saints' lead to 31–17 with 3:12 remaining. Porter's pick-six improved teams to 10–0 in Super Bowls when returning an interception for a touchdown, although that record is now 14–1 following Super Bowl LI, when the New England Patriots overcame a 28–3 deficit to the Atlanta Falcons.

Now down by two touchdowns, the Colts needed a touchdown on their next drive, followed by a successful onside kick, to stay alive, though they still had all three of their timeouts to use. Manning completed a 40-yard strike to Austin Collie, followed by two passes to Addai for 23 yards to reach the Saints' 3-yard line. When an offensive pass interference penalty against Garçon on 1st-and-goal pushed them back 10 yards, the Colts got those yards back on a reception by Addai on the next play. However, the next three plays saw a tipped pass by linebacker Scott Shanle that went off the goal post, Addai getting tackled for a 2-yard loss by defensive tackles Sedrick Ellis and Anthony Hargrove, and a pass that went through the hands of Wayne, effectively sealing the Saints' first Super Bowl title with 0:44 left on the clock. Brees took a knee, winning the Saints' first league championship in franchise history. It was also the first major league championship by a professional sports team from Louisiana to date.

=== Box score ===
Super Bowl XLIV: New Orleans Saints 31, Indianapolis Colts 17

Quarter	1	2	3	4	Total
Saints (NFC)	0	6	10	15	31
Colts (AFC)	10	0	7	0	17

at Sun Life Stadium, Miami Gardens, Florida

- Date: February 7, 2010
- Game time: 6:32 p.m. EST
- Game weather: Clear, 66 °F (19 °C)
- Game attendance: 74,059
- Referee: Scott Green (19)
- TV announcers (CBS): Jim Nantz and Phil Simms
- Recap, Game Book

Scoring summary

Quarter	Time	Drive			Team	Scoring information	Score	
Quarter	Time	Plays	Yards	TOP	Team	Scoring information	NO	IND
1	7:29	11	53	5:53	IND	38-yard field goal by Matt Stover	0	3
1	0:36	11	96	4:36	IND	Pierre Garçon 19-yard touchdown reception from Peyton Manning, Stover kick good	0	10
2	9:34	11	60	6:02	NO	46-yard field goal by Garrett Hartley	3	10
2	0:00	5	26	0:35	NO	44-yard field goal by Hartley	6	10
3	11:41	6	58	3:19	NO	Pierre Thomas 16-yard touchdown reception from Drew Brees, Hartley kick good	13	10
3	6:15	10	76	5:26	IND	Joseph Addai 4-yard touchdown run, Stover kick good	13	17
3	2:01	8	37	4:14	NO	47-yard field goal by Hartley	16	17
4	5:42	9	59	4:57	NO	Jeremy Shockey 2-yard touchdown reception from Brees, 2-point pass good (Brees to Lance Moore)	24	17
4	3:12	—	—	—	NO	Interception returned 74 yards for touchdown by Tracy Porter, Hartley kick good	31	17
"TOP" = time of possession. For other American football terms, see Glossary of American football.							31	17

=== Statistical overview ===
Drew Brees was named Super Bowl MVP for tying a Super Bowl record by completing 32 of 39 passes, with 288 passing yards and two touchdowns. After the game, Brees said, "Four years ago, who ever thought this would be happening when 85 percent of the city was under water? Most people left not knowing if New Orleans would ever come back, or if the organization would ever come back. We just all looked at one another and said, 'We are going to rebuild together. We are going to lean on each other.' This is the culmination in all that belief."

== Final statistics ==
Sources: NFL.com Super Bowl XLIV, Super Bowl XLIV Play Finder NO, Super Bowl XLIV Play Finder Ind, Hoffco Super Bowl XLIV Play by Play

=== Statistical comparison ===
Statistic	New Orleans Saints	Indianapolis Colts
First downs	20	23
First downs rushing	3	6
First downs passing	16	16
First downs penalty	1	1
Third down efficiency	3/9	6/13
Fourth down efficiency	0/1	1/2
Net yards rushing	51	99
Rushing attempts	18	19
Yards per rush	2.8	5.2
Passing–completions/attempts	32/39	31/45
Times sacked–total yards	1–7	0–0
Interceptions thrown	0	1
Net yards passing	281	333
Total net yards	332	432
Punt returns–total yards	1–4	1–0
Kickoff returns–total yards	4–102	5–111
Interceptions–total return yards	1–74	0–0
Punts–average yardage	2–44.0	2–45.0
Fumbles–lost	0–0	0–0
Penalties–yards	3–19	5–45
Time of possession	30:11	29:49
Turnovers	0	1

Records set
Highest completion percentage, career (minimum 30 completions)	82.1	Drew Brees (New Orleans)
Most completions, game, both teams	63	Saints (32), Colts (31)
Highest completion percentage, both teams	75%	Saints (82.1%), Colts (68.9%)
Most field goals, 40 or more yards, game	3	Garrett Hartley (New Orleans)
Oldest player	42	Matt Stover (Indianapolis)
Records tied
Largest deficit overcome, winning team	10 points	Saints
Most completions, game	32	Drew Brees (New Orleans)
Most two-point conversions, game	1	Lance Moore (New Orleans)
Most yards, touchdown drive	96 yards	Colts
Most first downs passing, both teams	32	Colts (16), Saints (16)
Fewest rushing attempts, game, both teams	37	Colts (19), Saints (18)
Most completions, game, team	32	Saints
Fewest times sacked, game, team	0	Colts
Fewest times sacked, game, both teams	1	Colts (0), Saints (1)
Fewest fumbles, game, both teams	0	Colts vs. Saints
Fewest turnovers, game, team	0	Saints

=== Individual statistics ===
Saints passing
	C/Att^{1}	Yds	TD	Int	Rating
Drew Brees	32/39	288	2	0	114.5
Saints rushing
	Car^{2}	Yds	TD	LG^{3}	Yds/Car
Pierre Thomas	9	30	0	7	3.33
Reggie Bush	5	25	0	12	5.00
Mike Bell	2	4	0	4	2.00
Drew Brees	1	−1	0	−1	−1.00
Devery Henderson	1	−7	0	−7	−7.00
Saints receiving
	Rec^{4}	Yds	TD	LG^{3}	Target^{5}
Marques Colston	7	83	0	27	9
Devery Henderson	7	63	0	19	7
Pierre Thomas	6	55	1	16	7
Reggie Bush	4	38	0	16	5
Jeremy Shockey	3	13	1	7	4
Lance Moore	2	21	0	21	2
Robert Meachem	2	6	0	6	3
David Thomas	1	9	0	9	1

Colts passing
	C/Att^{1}	Yds	TD	Int	Rating
Peyton Manning	31/45	333	1	1	88.5
Colts rushing
	Car^{2}	Yds	TD	LG^{3}	Yds/Car
Joseph Addai	13	77	1	26	5.92
Donald Brown	4	18	0	5	4.50
Mike Hart	2	4	0	4	2.00
Colts receiving
	Rec^{4}	Yds	TD	LG^{3}	Target^{5}
Dallas Clark	7	86	0	27	9
Joseph Addai	7	58	0	17	7
Austin Collie	6	66	0	40	9
Pierre Garçon	5	66	1	19	7
Reggie Wayne	5	46	0	14	11
Donald Brown	1	11	0	11	2

Notes:

- ^{1} Completions/attempts
- ^{2} Carries
- ^{3} Long gain
- ^{4} Receptions
- ^{5} Times targeted

=== Super Bowl records ===
- The Saints recorded the first successful onside kick attempt in a Super Bowl outside of the fourth quarter.
- Colts placekicker Matt Stover became the oldest player to participate, as well as to score, in a Super Bowl at 42 years and 11 days of age.
- Saints placekicker Garrett Hartley became the first kicker in Super Bowl history to kick three field goals of 40 or more yards.
- The Saints' victory marked the sixth straight win by the team wearing its white jersey.
- Saints quarterback Drew Brees had the second highest completion percentage in Super Bowl history (Phil Simms in Super Bowl XXI has the highest.) Brees also tied the mark for most completions in a Super Bowl, with 32. Drew Brees then broke the record when he made a 33rd pass completion in the game on a two-point conversion pass to Lance Moore in the 4th quarter.
- This was the first Super Bowl played in the formerly-named-Joe Robbie Stadium not to have a kickoff returned for a touchdown; because the Colts did not have a return touchdown, they also became the first team ever to lose a Super Bowl at this venue without achieving that. The San Francisco 49ers would later join them after Super Bowl LIV.
- The Saints became the third team to win the Super Bowl after trailing at halftime and failing to score a first-half touchdown. The New York Giants in Super Bowl XLII and the Dallas Cowboys in Super Bowl XXVIII are the only other two teams to do so. The New England Patriots would join them in Super Bowl LI.
- The Saints' 25 points in the second half is the fourth highest total in Super Bowl history. The New York Giants scored 30 in Super Bowl XXI while 28 was scored by both the San Francisco 49ers in Super Bowl XXIV and the Tampa Bay Buccaneers in Super Bowl XXXVII.
- The Saints also became the seventh team to win a Super Bowl after trailing to start the fourth quarter. The others to do so were: the New York Giants in Super Bowl XLII, the San Francisco 49ers in Super Bowl XXIII, the Washington Redskins in Super Bowl XVII, the Pittsburgh Steelers in Super Bowls X and XIV and the Baltimore Colts in Super Bowl V.
- Brees and Peyton Manning combined for a Super Bowl record 75% completion rate (63 of 84). They also accounted for the most combined pass completions in a Super Bowl, with 63.
- The Colts became just the sixth team to score 10 or more points in the first quarter and lose the game, joining the Chicago Bears in Super Bowl XLI, Miami Dolphins in Super Bowl XIX, the Denver Broncos in both Super Bowls XXI and XXII, and the New England Patriots in Super Bowl XXXI.
- Having been down 10 points in the first quarter, the Saints tied a record for the biggest comeback win in Super Bowl history, set in Super Bowl XXII when the Washington Redskins faced a 10-point first quarter deficit of their own. The New England Patriots tied this record in Super Bowl XLIX and broke it in Super Bowl LI when they overcame a 25-point deficit to beat the Atlanta Falcons in overtime. The Kansas City Chiefs would also tie New Orleans' 10-point comeback in Super Bowls LIV, LVII, and LVIII.
- The Saints are the ninth team to win the Super Bowl on their first attempt. The others are the Green Bay Packers of Super Bowl I, the New York Jets of Super Bowl III, the Pittsburgh Steelers of Super Bowl IX, the San Francisco 49ers of Super Bowl XVI, the Chicago Bears of Super Bowl XX, the New York Giants of Super Bowl XXI, the Baltimore Ravens of Super Bowl XXXV, and the Tampa Bay Buccaneers of Super Bowl XXXVII.

== Starting lineups ==
Hall of Fame‡

New Orleans	Position	Position	Indianapolis
Offense
Marques Colston	WR		Reggie Wayne
Jermon Bushrod	LT		Charlie Johnson
Carl Nicks	LG		Ryan Lilja
Jonathan Goodwin	C		Jeff Saturday
Jahri Evans	RG		Kyle DeVan
Jon Stinchcomb	RT		Ryan Diem
Jeremy Shockey	TE		Dallas Clark
Devery Henderson	WR		Pierre Garçon
Drew Brees‡	QB		Peyton Manning‡
Pierre Thomas	RB		Joseph Addai
Reggie Bush	RB	FB	Gijon Robinson
Defense
Bobby McCray	LE		Robert Mathis
Sedrick Ellis	DT	LDT	Daniel Muir
Will Smith	RE	RDT	Antonio Johnson
Marvin Mitchell	ILB	RE	Dwight Freeney‡
Scott Fujita	LOLB		Philip Wheeler
Jonathan Vilma	ILB		Gary Brackett
Scott Shanle	ROLB		Clint Session
Jabari Greer	LCB		Kelvin Hayden
Tracy Porter	RCB		Jacob Lacey
Roman Harper	SS		Melvin Bullitt
Darren Sharper	FS		Antoine Bethea

== Aftermath ==
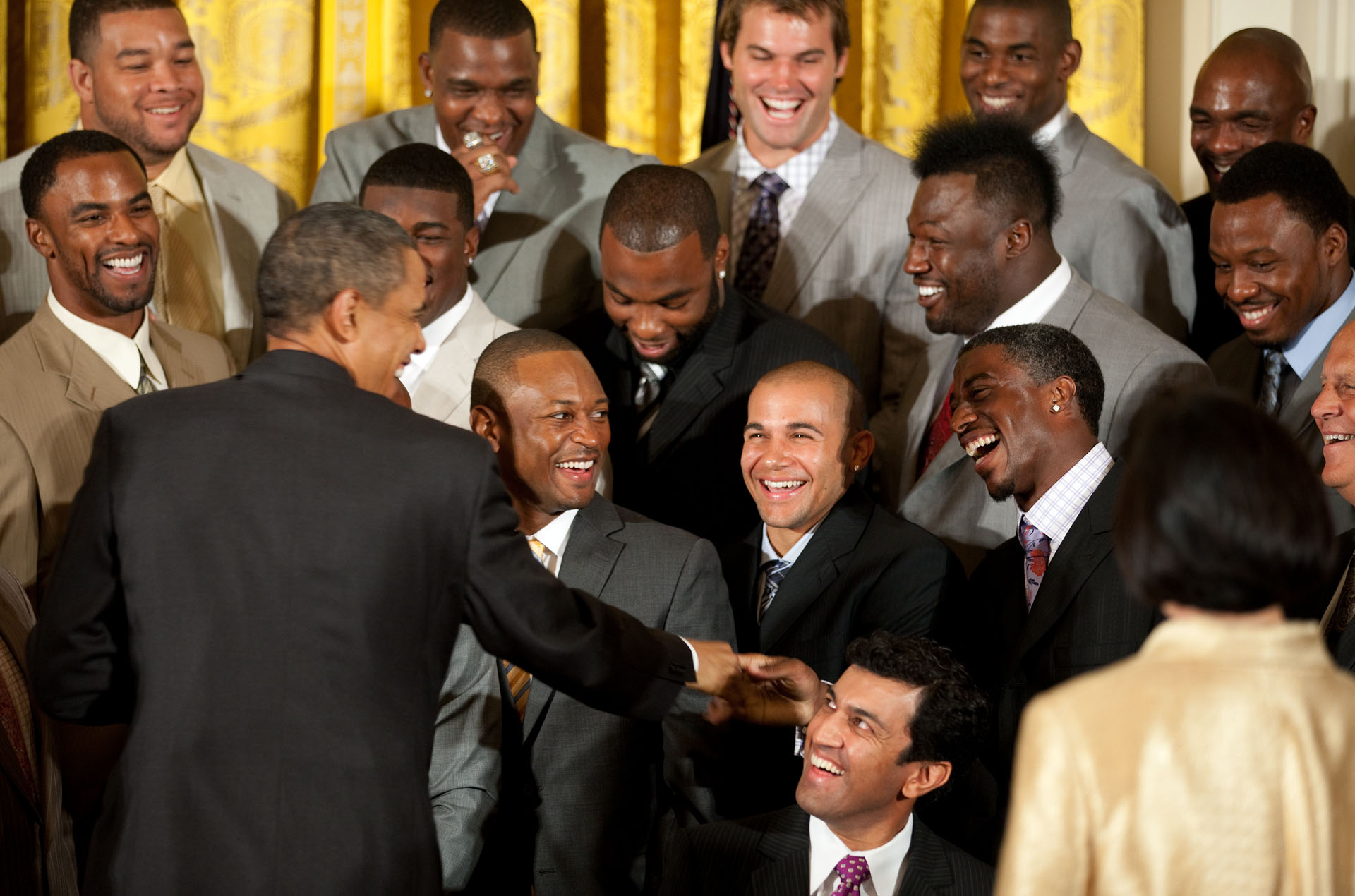
New Orleans Saints with President Barack Obama during their White House visit in August 2010.

Over a two-month period before Super Bowl 50, Slate writer Justin Peters viewed and ranked every single Super Bowl game in history. About Super Bowl XLIV, which he ranked the fifth best, Peters had this to say: "...coming as it did five years after New Orleans was flooded in Hurricane Katrina, the Saints' victory actually mattered."

The Saints finished the next season with an 11–5 record, but failed to defend their league title after they were eliminated by the Seattle Seahawks in the Wild Card playoff round. Super Bowl XLIV later became the subject of the wider New Orleans Saints bounty scandal, also known as "Bountygate", in which the NFL alleged in 2012 that several Saints defenders operated a slush fund that was in operation from the 2009 season and Super Bowl XLIV, through 2011. This alleged slush fund paid out bonuses, or "bounties", for in-game performance in violation of NFL rules, including deliberately injuring or knocking opposing players out of games. The league responded with some of the most severe sanctions in the league's 92-year history, and among the most severe punishments for an on-field incident in North American professional sports history. On appeal, former Commissioner Paul Tagliabue, appointed by Goodell to investigate, agreed that the bounty program had taken place, but he disagreed that it was the NFL's place to enact disciplinary measures and contended it was the duty of the coaches and management. All player suspensions were overturned in 2012. In 2012, New Orleans failed to make the playoffs for the first time since their Super Bowl win, with the sanctions for Bountygate cited as one of the primary causes. The Saints rebounded in 2013, but were eliminated in the Divisional playoff round by the eventual Super Bowl XLVIII champion Seattle Seahawks. They returned to the playoffs in 2017 by defeating the Carolina Panthers in the Wild Card Round, but lost to the Minnesota Vikings in the Divisional Round. The next season they defeated the Philadelphia Eagles in the Divisional Round to advance to their first NFC Championship Game since 2009 but lost to the Los Angeles Rams in controversial fashion. After playoff losses in 2019 and 2020, Saints quarterback and Super Bowl XLIV MVP Drew Brees retired after 20 seasons. Super Bowl XLIV remains the franchise's only Super Bowl appearance.

The Colts would finish the next season with a 10–6 record, but lost in the Wild Card round to the New York Jets. After that, the Colts plummeted to 2–14 after they lost Peyton Manning for the 2011 season to neck surgery. Manning was released following the season and signed with the Denver Broncos, with whom he won Super Bowl 50. The Colts would then proceed to draft quarterback Andrew Luck first overall in the 2012 NFL draft, with whom they went 11–5 for three consecutive years, won the AFC South twice, and made the 2014 AFC Championship Game, losing to the New England Patriots 45–7. In the 2015 and 2016 Colts' seasons, they finished 8–8 and missed the playoffs, which was mostly because Luck missed 10 combined games due to various injuries. In the 2017 season, the team finished 4–12 after they lost Luck to a shoulder injury for the year. Since Super Bowl XLIV, Indianapolis has been 106–103–1, with a 3–5 postseason record.

The Saints were the last team to win a championship game of a major professional sports league in North America on their first attempt until 2019, when both the Toronto Raptors of the NBA and the MLB's Washington Nationals accomplished the feat.

== Officials ==
- Referee – Scott Green (#19)
- Umpire – Undrey Wash (#96)
- Head linesman – John McGrath (#5)
- Line judge – Jeff Seeman (#45)
- Field judge – Rob Vernatchi (#75)
- Side judge – Greg Meyer (#78)
- Back judge – Greg Steed (#12)
- Alternate referee – Gene Steratore
- Alternate umpire – Ruben Fowler
- Alternate flank – Jim Mello
- Alternate deep – Jeff Lamberth
- Alternate back judge – Kirk Dornan

== Game time and weather conditions ==
- Kickoff was at 6:32 p.m. EST (23:32 UTC).
- Weather at kickoff was 66 °F (19 °C), clear.
- Game length was 3 hrs. 14 min.
