= AskMe =

AskMe or Ask Me may refer to:

- Ask Me, a TV series that airs on Treehouse TV and Qubo.
- Ask MetaFilter (short: AskMe), a subsite of community weblog MetaFilter
- AskMeNow, an American public corporation specializing in mobile search and advertising
- "Ask Me" (Elvis Presley song), a 1964 song by Elvis Presley
- "Ask Me", a song on the Amy Grant album Heart in Motion
- The AskMe EPSS, initially developed for health care in The Netherlands
