= Leeuwenhosen =

Overalls distributed by the Bavaria Brewery

Leeuwenhosen (Dutch pronunciation: [ˈleːu.ə(n)ˌɦoːzə(n)]; singular leeuwenhose) are orange-colored, lion-tailed overalls distributed by the Bavaria Brewery, a popular Dutch beer brewery, during the 2006 FIFA World Cup. The concept was realized by Peer Swinkels, the chairman of Bavaria. The leeuwenhosen refers to the lion as the Dutch national symbol, as is the 2006 FIFA World Cup mascot Goleo VI. The word "leeuwenhosen" is a mix of the Dutch word for "lions" and the German word for "trousers", in the same style as the German article of clothing called lederhosen.

== 2006 controversy ==
During the 2006 FIFA World Cup Bavaria distributed orange Leeuwenhosen (orange being the Dutch national colour, representing the royal House of Orange) with their company logo in cases of beer in the Netherlands in support of the Netherlands national football team. The problem with this was that Bavaria was not an official sponsor of the World Cup; Budweiser was the official beer sponsor. During the 16 June 2006 match between the Netherlands and the Ivory Coast team, spectators wearing Bavaria-branded Leeuwenhosen were ordered to disrobe by officials in Stuttgart, and many of these Dutch supporters watched the game in their underwear. FIFA reportedly anticipated this act of "ambush marketing" and instructed officials to distribute orange shorts to fans who required them after removing the Leeuwenhosen.

The Leeuwenhosen are no longer distributed by Bavaria, and they are now regarded as a collector's item by fans of the 2006 World Cup and breweriana collectors.

== 2010 controversy ==
Bavaria again distributed orange memorabilia in the Netherlands before the 2010 FIFA World Cup in South Africa, as is customary of breweries in the Netherlands. Unbranded orange minidresses were one of the promotional items, but FIFA officials again felt that this was an attempt at ambush marketing by Bavaria, who was not the official beer sponsor (Budweiser was again the official sponsor). Following the Netherlands-Denmark match in Johannesburg, FIFA forcibly removed 36 female fans because they wore the dresses and detained and questioned the three Dutch nationals for three hours (the other 33 were South African). Bavaria Chairman Peter Swinkels said of the incident, "There is not even a logo on those dresses, so what are we doing wrong? Since when is there a dress code at games?" Lawyers for FIFA investigated the incident, and found that many of the tickets were distributed to the British television network ITV. The tickets were sold to Bavaria by ITV pundit Robbie Earle, who was sacked by the network for the incident.
