= Texperts =

UK mobile question-and-answer service

- Company type: Wholly owned subsidiary
- Founded: August 2003 as Re5ult Ltd
- Fate: Defunct
- Headquarters: Cambridge, United Kingdom
- Services: SMS question-and-answer
- Owner: Knowledge Generation Bureau
- Website: KGBAnswers.co.uk

Do Sheep Shrink in the Rain?

Texperts was a UK-based SMS question-and-answer service. In December 2008, Texperts was bought by the United States–based Knowledge Generation Bureau, operator of the 118 118 services, a directory services company which had also entered the SMS question-and-answer market. The service was later renamed Kgb Answers and is now defunct.

== History ==
Re5ult Ltd was launched initially with a subscription-based service called 'Re5ult' on a normal mobile number. However, in August 2004 the service was launched on a premium text code and rebranded as 82ASK. In 2007, Re5ult switched phone numbers and brands again, relaunching the service as Texperts on short code 66000.

== Performance ==
Posing the question "How many people [are] alive compared with all who had ever lived?", a Guardian journalist testing the service received an answer within five minutes, with the closest rival answering it in 22 minutes. A similar question asked for "a hotel in Ireland within half an hour of Rosslare en route to Westmeath" which received an answer within 15 minutes; a rival service answered a few minutes sooner and also provided prices which Texperts's response lacked.

== Publications ==
In 2006, Texperts released the book Do Sheep Shrink in the Rain?, subtitled "Over 500 of the most outrageous questions ever asked", published by Virgin Books. The 256-page paperback is a compilation of questions received and answered by the service.

== See also ==
- AskMeNow
