= 118 118 (UK) =

Directory enquiries provider

118 118 company logo

118 118 is the UK telephone number for a US owned directory enquiries provider. Once wildly popular for its advertising featuring two runners, the service has experienced a dramatic decline in calls due to easily accessible information via mobile devices. Calls are answered from call centres in the Philippines, with some administration in Cardiff, Wales and other management offices in London, and provide answers to general questions on any subject. 118 118 started operation in December 2002. In September 2013 the company started 118 118 Money, a provider of unsecured personal loans and credit cards.

In 2006, kgb, the parent company of 118 118 in the UK, purchased rival Directory Assistance provider Conduit to produce the largest company of its type in the UK.

== Allocation of number ==
Numbers starting with "118" were designated for commercial directory enquiries when the fixed priced 40p British Telecom directory enquiries service on 192 and 142 was discontinued. The different 118 numbers were allocated by lottery. Originally Surrey-based Leaf Telecom was allocated the 118118 number; The Number UK Ltd paid a reported £2 million to acquire it.

== Products ==
=== Information services ===
118 118 is primarily seen as a directory enquiries service, but provides a wider range of options, not only providing numbers to users but also train times, cinema listings and directions.

In 2016, 118 118 launched a subscription service app which costs £2.48 a month for unlimited calls to the number, or £4.98 a month for unlimited calls and connections.

Calls to 118 118 cost £2.43 per minute (a minimum 60 second charge applies) including VAT, plus the access charge set by the caller's landline or mobile phone provider.

In May 2008, 118 118 introduced a service whereby customers can ask any question they want.

== Ofcom regulations and pricing ==
New Ofcom regulations came into force on 1 July 2015, making all call charges to 118 numbers more transparent, consisting of an access charge and a service charge. 118 118 increased their prices on 1 March 2016 and on 1 May 2017.

The access charge is set by the caller's landline or mobile provider. It is set at the same rate as for calls to 084, 087 and 09 numbers. Including VAT, it varies between 2p and 27p per minute from landlines or between 4p and 89p per minute from mobiles.

The service charge for calls to 118 118 is £2.50 per call plus 75p per minute including VAT.

=== Any question SMS services ===
In December 2008, The Number UK Ltd, purchased Texperts, which had operated in the UK since 2003. The service offered answers to questions on any topic sent via SMS text message by text message, for a charge of £3.50. Texperts was later renamed Kgb Answers and is now defunct.

=== Financial services ===
The company's lending business 118 118 Money, a subsidiary of kgb, launched as an online service in September 2013. The company states they are able to extend the availability of unsecured personal loans to people who may otherwise find it difficult to borrow.

== Advertising ==
118 118's marketing featured two men with droopy moustaches, wearing items of clothing with 118 and two parallel red stripes on it. They were designed by advertising agency WCRS and PR & communications agency Brazil. They have appeared in various forms, including 'mad professors' with crazy grey hair, and an army of 118 118 runners helping people across the nation to find businesses and services.

The 118 118 advertising was originally launched using the two men dressed as athletic runners. Used with the catchphrase "Got Your Number!", the runners' characters featured in a high-profile advertising and PR campaign leading up to deregulation in August 2003, when the original 192 directory number was switched off. Although this slogan has fallen into disuse, it has lived on in the minds of the public. The use of the runners' characters is particularly noted for the legal action by 1970s record-breaking runner David Bedford. 118 118 responded to this by stating that their inspiration was partly the late American runner Steve Prefontaine. Bedford subsequently briefly worked for 118 500, a rival directory enquiries service provided by BT.

Since then, the 118 characters appeared in a range of guises, including spoof detectives, as the company expanded on its range of services. During this period the slogan used was "We're here to help!".

The 118 118 Team: A parody of The A-Team

In February 2006 a new advertising campaign was launched in which the runners appeared in advertisements in the style of the television show The A-Team, using the A-Team theme tune with the number 118 sung over the music. Various routes followed, and then in early 2009 Ray Parker Jr. appeared alongside the droopy moustache men singing a 118 specific version of the Ghostbusters theme tune, at one point featuring the 118 men in place of the Stay Puft Marshmallow Man from the film. In late 2009, the runners were animated, specifically promoting food and drink establishments available for booking via 118 118. This service has since been discontinued, and in 2010 this campaign was dropped in favour of comedic scenarios. In 2013 the advertising shows an army of 118 118 runners, to illustrate that the service provides the numbers of many businesses.

From March 2007, 118 118 began to sponsor ITV1 Movies. As of 2013 this continued, with the two 118 characters conversing over the phone with stars from old 'B' movies. A daily cartoon strip advertising the service also ran, from 2008 to 2010, in free newspaper Metro.

The advertising strategy for 118 118 has also been used for 118 218 in France, 118 50 in Ireland, and 18 18 in Switzerland.

== Criticism ==
In 2003, shortly after the company started operation, it was alleged that some call centre operators cut calls short to reduce the average call time, increasing bonuses payable under an incentive scheme. Oftel and ICSTIS warned the company that it could be fined or lose its licence to operate if found to have encouraged the practice, but were satisfied that the company had moved quickly to stamp out any abuses, including dismissing some employees after investigating.

In 2008, 118 118 sent racist jokes about Asians and Pakistanis to users of its texted joke service, and complaints were made to the press. The company responded that the jokes were in breach of their standards, and apologised. Although not made public at the time, the racist jokes sent were made in response to a direct, explicit request for racist jokes.

In December 2013 it emerged that when asked for a number of a named business, 118 118 operators often give a sales pitch suggesting that a different company offering similar services be called instead. Companies whose customers were thus referred to competitors complained about this practice. 118 118 defended this cross-selling of services, suggesting it was partly because firms had not paid to be included on its database. They said that offers were compliant with the code of practice of regulator PhonepayPlus (now Phone-paid Services Authority). However, the regulator added that a caller should receive the information requested without undue delay (chargeable as part of the call), and that unreasonably delayed callers should contact PhonepayPlus.

In 2014, failure to clearly state call costs resulted in a fine for the 118 118 service.

In 2017, soaring call costs for directory enquiries services including 118 118 and 118 500 prompted an Ofcom review of 118 services.

The outcome of that review was the Service Charge for calls to 118 numbers being capped at £3.65 per 90 seconds of a call from 1 April 2019. From this date, twenty-six of the existing one hundred Service Charge price points were no longer available for use by services on telephone numbers starting 118. Of those twenty-six price points, some fifteen price points were now available only for use by services on numbers starting 09, and eleven price points were completely withdrawn from use. Some of those eleven were redesignated with a new price, lower than the new cap, in the following months.
