= Rule 40 =

By-law in the Olympic Charter

Rule 40 is a by-law in the Olympic Charter stating that only approved sponsors may reference "Olympic-related terms". It was introduced by the International Olympic Committee (IOC) to prevent so-called ambush marketing by companies who are not official sponsors and to sanction links between athletes and unofficial sponsors during a blackout period starting nine days before the opening of the Olympic Games and continuing until three days after the closing ceremony.

Controversy sparked in the days before the 2016 Summer Olympics as Rule 40 was upheld to prevent companies from retweeting anything from the official Olympic Twitter account, or using official hashtags such as #Rio2016.

The rules were loosened for American athletes for the 2016 Rio Olympics. United States Olympic & Paralympic Committee (USOPC) chief marketing officer, Lisa Baird said the decision was made to "address the dissatisfaction of athletes but also protect the rights of the Olympic rights holders.” Companies not sponsoring the Olympics could make advertisements with Olympic athletes, but were not permitted to involve anything about the Olympics.

The German Cartel Office in 2019 declared that all German participants in the Olympics no longer had to abide by the IOC's ruling. The Cartel Office officials agreed that many of their country's athletes rely on their sponsors to create a larger name and revenues for themselves. Since no athlete receives the money made by the IOC's sponsor advertising, the Cartel president decided that "self-marketing during the games plays a very important role," and he permitted the decision.

The IOC added new updates to Rule 40 and created "Key Principles." The principles focus on how athletes can engage in monetary advertising practices with their sponsors if they have any. The IOC manages the rules of the Olympic Charter, but they have stated that National Olympic Committees will be the main overseers of their respective countries.

The USOPC has updated its protocols for Rule 40 for the Tokyo 2020 Olympics. Sponsors and their athletes alike will be permitted to thank and congratulate one another during the Olympic events. Restrictions on what they can say will still be present. Athletes are limited to seven statements or social media posts gratifying their sponsors and sponsors will still not be permitted to include pictures or words regarding the Olympics.
