= Ambush marketing =

Type of marketing strategy

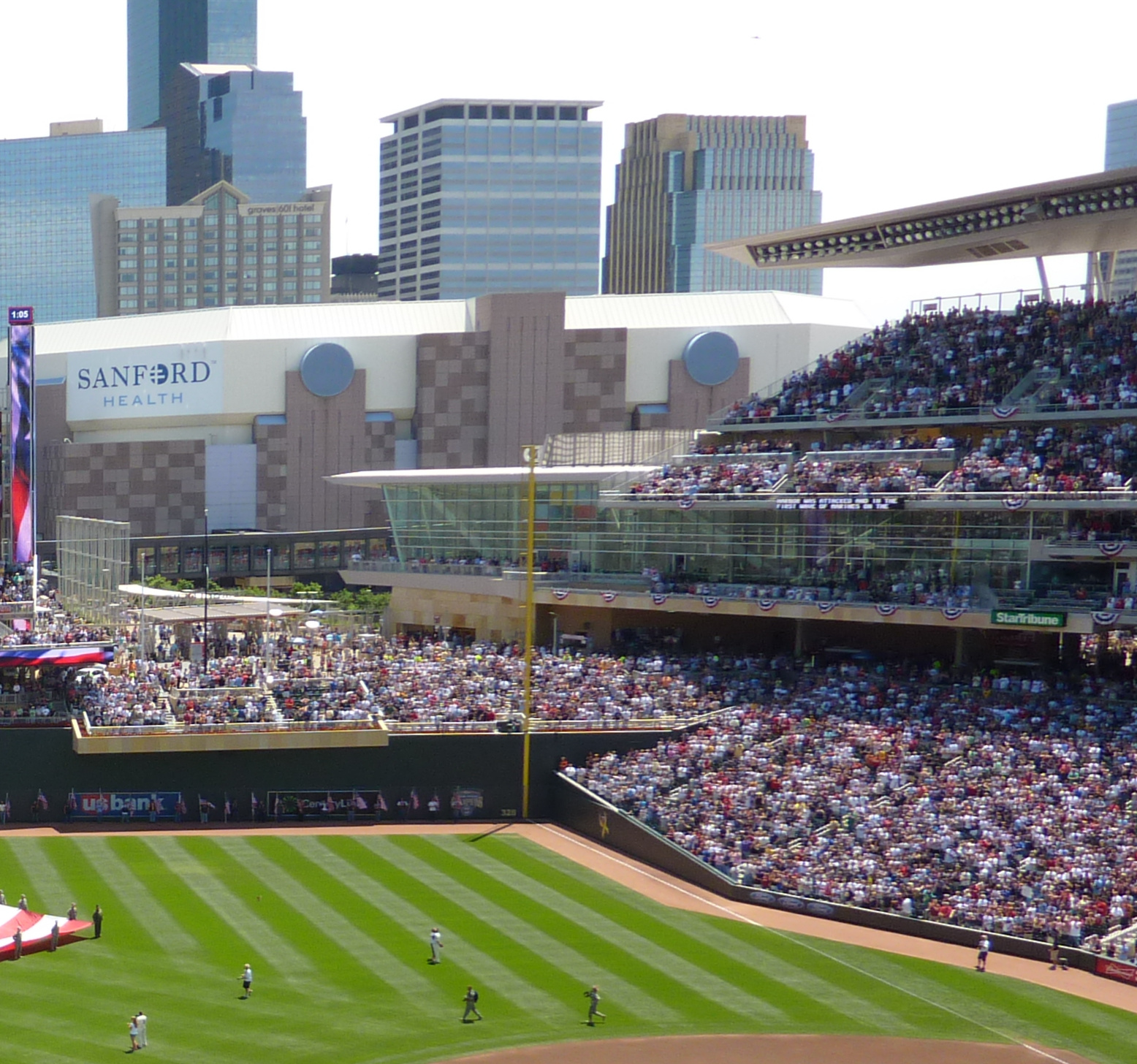
A billboard for Sanford Health placed on the exterior of the Target Center, adjacent to Target Field, so that it is visible from within to compete with a sponsorship held by a competitor.

Ambush marketing or ambush advertising is a marketing strategy in which an advertiser "ambushes" an event to compete for exposure against other advertisers.

The term was coined by marketing strategist Jerry Welsh, while he was working as the manager of global marketing efforts for American Express in the 1980s. Most ambush marketing campaigns aim to associate a brand with the prominence of a major event, without actually being an "official" partner or sponsor of said event. An advertiser may indirectly ambush an event by alluding to its imagery and themes without referencing any specific trademarks associated with it, or in "direct" and "predatory" means—where an advertiser engages in the fraudulent use of official names and trademarks to deliberately mislead consumers.

Actions against ambush advertising are most common in sport (where major events such as the FIFA World Cup, Olympic Games, and the Super Bowl are prominent targets), as the practice can devalue and dilute exclusive sponsorship rights, and in some cases, infringe upon the organizers' intellectual property rights. Such actions may include restricting advertising in "clean zones" around an event site, removing or obscuring references to non-sponsors at venues, and requiring host countries to pass laws to grant the organizer legal rights to enforce clean zones, and to restrict the use of specific words and concepts to create unofficial associations with the event.

Anti-ambush marketing regulations have attracted controversy for limiting freedom of speech, and for preventing companies from factually promoting themselves in the context of an event.

== Intent and techniques ==
Promotional video for Pac-Man and the Ghostly Adventures, in which Bandai Namco employees project a giant image of Pac-Man onto the Sega of Europe headquarters in London, casting him alongside Sonic the Hedgehog.

Typically, ambush marketing is used to "ride off" the prominence and draw of a major event, aligning promotional activities and publicity around it, without having to pay fees to the event's organizer to be designated as an "official" sponsor in a certain product category. Ambush marketing techniques can be classified into two categories. The first, "direct" forms of ambush marketing, involve advertisers promoting themselves as being a part of or associated with an event, diluting the exposure of official sponsors and their respective campaigns—especially if they are the product of the non-sponsor's competitors, while indirect forms of ambush marketing use imagery relating to an event in advertising to evoke a mental connection with it, without specifically mentioning it.

"Predatory" forms of direct ambush marketing involve fraudulent claims by a non-sponsor that pass themselves off as being an "official" sponsor, usually by making direct references to trademarks relating to an event, but without having any official authorization from the event's organizers to identify itself as an official sponsor or use its trademarks. An advertiser may attempt to perform a publicity stunt inside the venue itself to attract attention to their brand, such as having attendees wear attire that is associated with the company. An official sponsor can also be involved in direct ambush marketing if they perform more extensive promotional activities at an event than they were originally authorized, such as distributing branded merchandise when they were only granted advertising on signage—especially if these activities compete with those of another sponsor authorized to do so.

A company may also perform direct ambush marketing by riding coattails—factually marketing their role in connection to an event or its participants. For example, a company which produces sporting equipment may advertise that they are the official supplier for a specific athlete or team. Similarly, a non-sponsor may choose to solely sponsor the event's telecast by a broadcaster, but not the event itself. The factual acknowledgment of a non-sponsor's involvement with the participants in an event by, for example, a television host or commentator, can also be considered an incidental form of coattail marketing, as it provides additional unpaid publicity to the brand.

Most forms of indirect ambush marketing involve a non-sponsor making use of imagery, themes, and values similar to what the event and campaigns from official sponsors express, either positively or negatively, and without making specific references to the event itself or its trademarks. In essence, the advertiser markets itself using content that evokes a mental association with the event, and as a result, appeals to those who are aware of the event. Advertisers may use a well-known nickname for the event that is not a trademark, such as "the big game".

Similarly, a non-sponsor may use "distractive" techniques to divert consumers' attention away from the actual event and its official sponsors using similarly indirect means; for example, a non-sponsor may saturate the area at or around its venue (including street vendors, billboards, and public transport) with a competing marketing presence. Such "saturation marketing" may either be indirectly related to the event, or be incidental and make no references at all. In some cases, a company may sponsor or create a similar "parallel property," designed to compete directly with a major property by evoking similar themes and virtues.

== Regulations ==
In response to the threats of ambush marketing and other forms of trademark infringement, organizers of major sporting events have sometimes required host countries or cities to implement special laws that, going beyond standard trademark law, provide regulations and penalties for advertisers who disseminate marketing materials that create unauthorized associations with an event by making references to specific words, concepts, and symbols. Organizers may also require a city to set up "clean zones" in and around venues, in which advertising and commerce is restricted to those that are authorized by the event's organizer—specifically, the event's official sponsors.

In some cases, a venue may be required to suspend its naming rights for the duration of the event if the venue is named for a concern that is not an official sponsor, during which it is referred to under a generic name by all event-related materials and telecasts, and all signage referring to the sponsored name may be obscured or removed. For example, 2010 Winter Olympics hockey venue General Motors Place (since renamed to Rogers Arena) was renamed "Canada Hockey Place" for the duration of the Games. For similar reasons, Toyota Stadium in Toyota, Japan was renamed "City of Toyota Stadium" during the 2019 Rugby World Cup, in order to clarify that the stadium is named for its geographical location and not for the Toyota Motor Corporation (which is based in the city).

Broadcasters of events may be contractually required to give the official sponsors right of first refusal to purchase advertising time during their telecasts. Some events may require all advertising time to be controlled and allocated by the organizer itself, such as the UEFA Champions League.

=== Examples ===
The earliest example of general anti-ambush advertising legislation were passed in South Africa in 2001 in preparation for the 2003 Cricket World Cup. The law gave the Minister of Trade and Industry the ability to designate specific events as "protected," making it illegal to use the event's trademarks visually, audibly, and "in promotional activities, which in any way, directly or indirectly, is intended to be brought into association with or to allude to an event," to "derive special promotional benefit from the event," without the consent of the organizer. Prior to the 2011 Rugby World Cup, New Zealand passed the similar "Major Events Management Act," which prohibits any promotional use of words, emblems, and concepts implying association with events specifically designated as "major" by the national government, without permission from the event's organizers. The law also provides the ability for clean zones to be established around event sites for the purposes of enforcing advertising rules and providing crowd control.

Rule 40 of the Olympic Charter forbids all Olympic athletes from participating in marketing activities for companies that are not official sponsors of the Olympics, even if they have official relationships with the advertiser, during a timeframe that begins 9 days before the opening ceremony, and ends 3 days after the Games' conclusion.

The United Kingdom passed the London Olympic Games and Paralympic Games Act 2006 prior to the 2012 Summer Olympics: on top of existing laws providing special protection for Olympic symbols, the act banned the use of the words "2012" and "Games" by non-sponsors, either together, or with words or concepts relating to the event, such as "Gold," "Silver," "Bronze," "Medals," "Summer," "Sponsors," or "London," to imply an association with the Games. LOCOG also announced plans to enforce these rules in the internet keyword advertising market.

== Examples ==
=== The "credit card wars" ===
The Olympic Games previously allowed any number of companies to be official sponsors, and there were a record 628 sponsors for the 1976 Summer Olympics in Montreal. Despite the revenue it provided for the Games, the ability for sponsors to promote awareness of themselves within the context of the Games was diluted by the sheer number. In order to improve the value of these sponsorships, the International Olympic Committee implemented a system of exclusive sponsorship rights within specific market categories for the 1984 Summer Olympics. The exclusive sponsorship rights in turn led to the first notable instances of ambush marketing, which occurred between the 1984 Summer Olympics in Los Angeles, and the 1988 Summer Olympics in Seoul.

In 1985, credit card company American Express (Amex) had turned down an offer to be the Olympics' global credit card sponsor. Amex rival Visa Inc. went on to sign a $14.5 million deal with the IOC. In response, Amex began a marketing campaign in Asia promoting merchandise from a fictitious "Olympic Heritage Committee," supposedly based in Switzerland. American Express halted the campaign following complaints by the IOC, who threatened to denounce the company's actions with ads and media events in which sports ministers and Olympic athletes from the countries involved in the campaign would cut American Express credit cards into pieces, if they did not withdraw the ads. In a follow-up, American Express released ads featuring a photo from the opening ceremony of the 1986 Asian Games held in the same city, captioned "Amex welcomes you to Seoul." The ad was intended to mislead readers into thinking that it was a photo of the Olympics' opening ceremony. Jerry Welsh, who was the manager of global marketing efforts for American Express in the 1980s, defended Amex's practices as a corporation's duty to its shareholders after they lost out on the official Olympic sponsorship rights to Visa, as well as coining the term "ambush marketing" to refer to these activities.

Amex's campaigns resulted in retaliatory advertising from Visa; in a continuation of an ongoing campaign promoting its exclusivity at certain venues and events, Visa ran advertising promoting that it was the only credit card accepted at Olympic venues and for purchasing tickets. Amex in turn felt that Visa's advertisements were misleading, citing viewers who interpreted the ads as to believe that no other credit cards were accepted anywhere in the host city during the Olympics (such as at shops and restaurants), rather than applying only for Olympic ticket sales and at venues. Prior to the 1992 Winter Olympics and Summer Olympics, American Express aired advertisements acknowledging these facts, explained with the slogan "You'll need a passport, but you don't need a Visa." Prior to the 1992 Summer Olympics, the company also promoted a partnership with Iberia and Turespaña that made American Express "the official credit card of tourism in Spain"—a campaign which factored the Olympics, as well as Seville Expo '92. The IOC negotiated a truce between Amex and Visa to tone down their advertisements, but encouraged Visa once Amex returned to its ambush marketing in 1994.

As a result of Amex's continued ambush, Visa did not yet renew its sponsorship deal for the 1996 Summer Olympics. In the lead up to those Games, IOC vice president Dick Pound then met Amex CEO James Robinson in Atlanta. Pound had threatened to invite the U.S. women's gymnastics team to a press conference where they would denounce Amex saying "We don’t understand why American Express is pretending it’s helping us; it’s not helping us, it’s hurting us. ‘I’m not going to do business with a company that has morals like that.’ SNIP.’” as they would proceed to cut Amex credit cards into pieces. AMEX's Robinson complied and agreed not to mount an ambush campaign at these Games. Michael Lynch, who was in charge of Visa’s Olympic marketing efforts in Atlanta, noted “There was a list of competitors that we had, and letters would go out to the CEOs and the CMOs in advance of the Games basically saying, ‘Stand down, please don’t undermine the efforts of the Olympic movement. That all came from Dick’s vision. Those that were in the family, Dick looked after those organizations. And by doing so, it only increased the value of the Olympic property. It allowed them to charge more money for the assets we received, and the value was more Games-in and Games-out.”

=== Nike ===
Since the mid 1990s, Nike became known for several major ambush marketing schemes at the Olympics and association football tournaments.

In the 1992 Summer Olympics, while the United States Olympic team was sponsored by Reebok, most of the prominent players on the United States men's Olympic basketball team had been signed up by Nike as professionals. At the podium ceremony Michael Jordan famously covered up the Reebok logo with the American flag.

At the 1996 Summer Olympics, Nike engaged in a marketing campaign including magazine ads and billboards, to compete with Reebok who had paid $50 million to become the event's official sponsor. Nike gave a $30,000 pair of gold-colored racing shoes to Michael Johnson, which he used during competition and later displayed on the cover of Time magazine. Consistent with its aggressively-toned marketing of the time, Nike's campaign featured slogans parodying those of the Olympics and attacking its values, including "Faster, Higher, Stronger, Badder", "You don't win Silver, you lose Gold", and "If you're not here to win, you're a tourist." Nike set up a prominent pop-up store near the athletes' village, and was also attempting to have fans to display signs with the aforementioned slogans inside venues. IOC marketing director Michael Payne noted that the campaign was being widely criticized, as athletes were "likely to be uncomfortable when their shoe sponsor says they have failed unless they win a gold medal", and that Nike was "crossing the very fine line between having an impact and biting the hand that creates tomorrow's heroes." Jim Andrews, a marketing executive, said "Nike took a lot of flack for that campaign. It wasn't in the spirit of the games. There's a lot of consumer love for the Olympics and the athletes, and that [marketing] just crossed the line for a lot of people." Payne and the United States Olympic Committee's marketing director John Krimsky held a meeting over the campaign with Howard Slusher, a subordinate of Nike co-founder Phil Knight. The meeting quickly turned aggressive; Payne threatened IOC counter-measures, including pulling accreditation for Nike employees, banning the display of its logos on equipment, and organizing a press conference where silver medallists from the Games, as well as prominent Nike-sponsored athlete Michael Johnson, would denounce the company. Faced with these threats, Nike agreed to retract most of its negative advertising and PR stunts.

After Reebok unexpectedly pulled out on short notice, and likely attributed to new rules by the IOC and USOC that effectively banned Nike's aggressive ambush marketing antics used in 1996, Nike stepped in as the official sportswear supplier of the 2000 Summer Olympics in Sydney, Australia—using them to launch the company's first-ever global marketing campaign. To rebuke Nike's negative rhetoric, the IOC also engaged in a global marketing campaign of its own called "Celebrate Humanity", with one ad proclaiming 'Someone once said “If you don’t win the silver, you lose the gold.” Obviously they never won the silver.’

For the 2012 Summer Olympics, Nike was not an official sponsor but ran an ad campaign titled ‘Find Your Greatness’ featuring “everyday athletes” from cities named London in Ohio, Canada, Nigeria and Jamaica, which also tactfully avoided infringing on sponsorship rules.

At the 2020 Summer Olympics, during the medal ceremony the Brazil men's Olympic football team players did not fully wear the Brazil's official Olympic uniform provided by Chinese manufacturer Peak Sport, sporting only the pants while the jackets were tied around their waists. The players wore their Nike jerseys on the podium, apparently under orders from the Brazilian Football Confederation, as Nike sponsors their football teams. Other Brazilian athletes complained that the football players were not part of the Olympic team. Peak Sport voiced concern that Nike could be confused as one of its subsidiary brands.

Nike also performed saturation ambushes at UEFA Euro 1996 and the 1998 FIFA World Cup, by buying advertising space in the vicinity of the host venues in order to prevent the official sponsors (Umbro and Adidas respectively) from being able to promote themselves. Nike's actions influenced the eventual adoption of "safe zone" rules, requiring official sponsors to have exclusive use of all advertising locations within a certain radius of an event's venue.

For the 2010 FIFA World Cup, Nike conducted the “Write the Future” ad campaign, avoiding uses of FIFA or World Cup in its branding, but gaining awareness thanks to a YouTube video that featured star footballers, star athletes from other sports, and celebrities.

=== FIFA World Cup ===
During the 2006 FIFA World Cup, Bavaria Brewery distributed "Leeuwenhosen"—branded overalls with lion tails, colored in the orange of the Netherlands national football team. Officials at games directed fans to take off the Leeuwenhosen and put on orange-colored shorts instead, as the clothing infringed on the exclusive beer sponsorship rights owned by Anheuser-Busch. Bavaria Brewery was again accused of ambush marketing at the 2010 FIFA World Cup, when 36 female fans were ejected from a game (along with the arrest of two, later released, accused of violating the Contravention of Merchandise Marks Act) for wearing unbranded orange miniskirts that were provided by Bavaria; Sylvie van der Vaart, wife of Dutch player Rafael van der Vaart, had modeled one of the miniskirts in an advertising campaign for the brewery. Robbie Earle was also fired from his roles as ITV Sport pundit and ambassador for England's bid for the 2018 World Cup, when it was claimed by FIFA that he had sold tickets meant for family and friends on to Bavaria.

Prior to the 2010 FIFA World Cup, South African budget airline Kulula.com ran an advertisement that played upon the fact that they were not an official sponsor of the tournament: it described themselves as "Unofficial National Carrier of the You-Know-What," and contained images of stadiums, balls, vuvuzelas and national flags. The ad was pulled following a complaint by FIFA, who claimed that the ads contained symbols that constituted an unauthorized association with the event when used together. Kulula.com mocked FIFA's objections in subsequent advertising: a follow-up ad deliberately replaced the items from the first ad with similarly-shaped items (such as disco balls and golf tees), and explained that there were other reasons to travel South Africa in the summer of 2010 "than just for that thing we wouldn't dare mention." The airline also announced that it would give away free flights to anyone named "Sepp Blatter"; the offer was redeemed for a dog named after the then-FIFA president.

=== Olympic Games ===
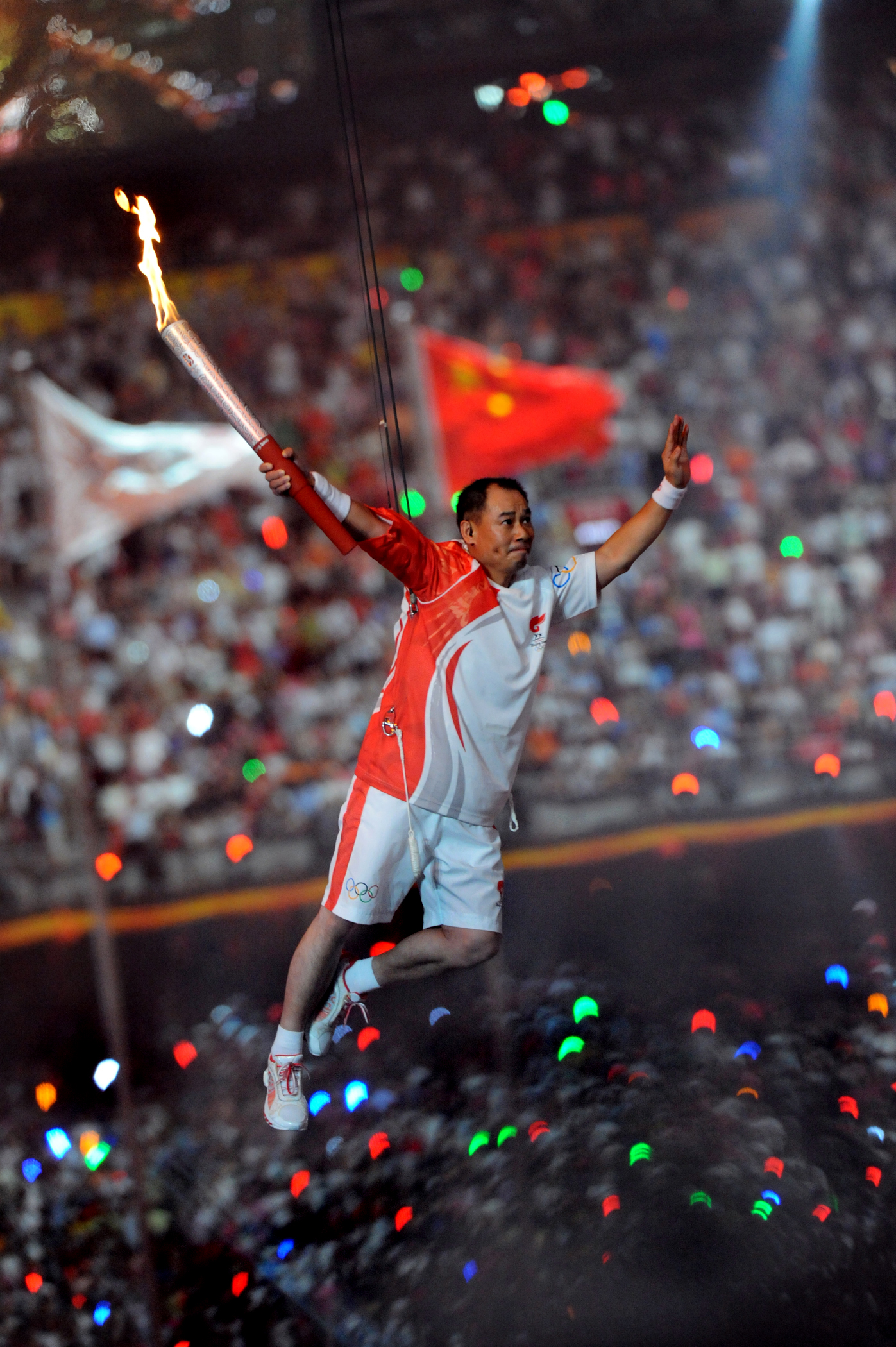
Li Ning carrying the torch at the opening ceremony of the 2008 Summer Olympics.

The International Olympic Committee has required host cities to enact measures to restrict commerce around venues, ensure official sponsors have access to public advertising space, "reduce and sanction" ambush marketing, and keep venues "clean" of any references to non-sponsors.

At the 2008 Summer Olympics in Beijing, the IOC worked with the local organizing committee to develop a "robust brand-protection program"; logos of non-sponsors were covered with tape on equipment at Games facilities—a restriction that applied even to appliances, bathroom fixtures, elevators, and fire extinguishers. However, there was a high-profile ambush during the opening ceremony; former Olympic gymnast Li Ning, who founded an eponymous Chinese shoe company, lit the Olympic cauldron. The Li-Ning company was not an official sponsor of the Games (but did act as an equipment supplier for some of China's teams), and Li wore Adidas apparel for the sequence per its official sponsorship. On the first trading day following the ceremony, Li-Ning's share price increased by 3.52%.

Prior to the 2012 Summer Olympics in London, England, bookmaker Paddy Power placed ads promoting itself as the "official sponsor" of "the largest athletics event in London this year"—an egg-and-spoon race in the French village of London, Burgundy, with a prize of €100 in Paddy Power credit. LOCOG threatened Paddy Power over the campaign, but backtracked after the bookmaker threatened to take them to court. When announcing the planned lawsuit, a Paddy Power spokesmen quipped that "It's a pity they didn't put the same energy in to the ticketing and security arrangements for the Games that they put into protecting their sponsorship revenue streams." Nike released a television advert tying into the Games with a similar concept, featuring footage of athletes training in other places named "London", and the tagline "Greatness doesn't only exist in SW19". Following the Games, a study by the Global Language Monitor found that several non-sponsors, including Centrica, Ericsson, Philips, and Subway, were among the brands with the highest perceived relationship between themselves and the Games.

In January 2014, prior to the 2014 Winter Olympics, clothing company The North Face was sued by the Canadian Olympic Committee (COC) for marketing a line of "villagewear" apparel that it felt implied an unauthorized association with the Games. The apparel had designs featuring the colors and symbols of countries (such as red and white with a maple leaf for Canada) and patches reading "RU 14," were described in a catalog as "[capturing] the international spirit of the Olympic Games," and several items in the catalog contained references to Sochi in their names. The COC also felt that the name "villagewear" implied a reference to Olympic Villages, accused a retailer of the line of using the Olympic rings on a store sign, and accused the company of running a contest that purported to offer tickets to the Games as prizes (in violation of terms and conditions restricting redistribution of tickets without permission). The North Face disputed the COC's claims, arguing that it did not imply it was an official supporter of the COC, did not use any of the official branding elements of the Games, that the COC had no right to restrict usage of national symbols that are in the public domain, and that the COC did not hold rights to the "alleged Olympic trademarks" at all since they were owned by the IOC. The suit went to trial in December 2014, and was settled in October 2016, after The North Face parent company VF Corporation agreed to make a donation to the Canadian Olympic Foundation.

Prior to the 2016 Summer Olympics, Rule 40 was loosened by the IOC to allow some campaigns by non-sponsors involving athletes to occur during the Games, as long as the campaign had begun within a certain timeframe prior to the Games, and do not imply an association with the Olympics; this includes advertising material containing "Olympic-related terms" such as the current year, the host city's name, "Games," "Olympians," "Sponsors," "Medal," "Gold," "Silver," "Bronze," "Challenge," "Effort," "Performance," and "Victory", any references to Olympic results, all pictures taken at the Olympics, and even retweeting official Olympic accounts. It also requires the submission of waivers to the IOC and the country's National Olympic Committee that describe the extent of the marketing involving athletes. The ruling was criticized for muting the discussion of the Olympics on the part of those sponsors that fund individual athletes. The IOC defended it as a necessary tool against ambush marketing that had plagued the committee in the past.

In July 2016, the Australian Olympic Committee sued mobile provider Telstra over adverts promoting its partnership with the Seven Network to offer subscribers free premium access to its digital coverage of the 2016 Summer Olympics, as the broadcaster's "official technology partner". The ad was set to a version of Peter Allen's song "I Go to Rio"—a phrase which was also used as the tagline of the campaign. The AOC argued that the promotion was deceiving and could imply that Telstra was an official sponsor of the Australian Olympic team (Telstra was previously an official sponsor, but ended its relationship in 2015). Telstra defended the ads, stating that they were intended to promote its relationship with the official broadcaster, and that it would amend the ads to disclaim that the company is not an official sponsor of the AOC or any related entities. On 29 July 2016, a federal court ruled in favor of Telstra, stating that there was "no doubt" the campaign was relating to the Games without using its trademarks, but that it was "not enough for the AOC to prove that the advertisements were Olympic-themed."

The IOC's restrictive ambush marketing rules were one factor in the National Hockey League's decision to not accommodate its players in the 2018 Olympics; for the previous five Olympics, the NHL scheduled an extended break in the regular season to allow players to participate, and placed its All-Star Game on hiatus. The NHL noted that the rules disallowed teams from promoting their players' participation in the tournament.

The 2028 Summer Olympics in Los Angeles will, as a pilot, allow venues with naming rights held by official sponsors to continue using their names while the Games are in progress; with their status as "Founding Partners" of LA 2028, venues such as Honda Center and Intuit Dome will maintain their sponsored names during the Games. The organizing committee will also sell sponsorships to the temporary venues being constructed for the Games. Organizing committee CEO Casey Wasserman said he had to explain to the IOC that U.S. sports venues were commonly referred to by residents under their sponsored names, while the organizers also cited the previous 1984 Olympics in Los Angeles for their previous influence on the Olympics' commercial model.

=== NFL ===
The National Football League has historically been protective over unauthorized uses of its intellectual property, such as the game telecasts themselves, and most notably, its trademark for the Super Bowl—the league's championship game. To protect these properties and its official sponsors, the league has historically sent reminders and cease and desist notices to advertisers and businesses—including establishments that may be showing the game—that use references to "Super Bowl," "Super Sunday," or team names in promotional activities related to the Super Bowl. Although using part of a trademark for descriptive purposes, without implying official association, can be considered a nominative use under United States trademark law, non-sponsors typically use euphemisms such as "the Big Game" to refer to the Super Bowl in advertising to protect themselves from liability. In 2006, the NFL submitted an application to register "The Big Game" as a trademark as well, but withdrew following opposition by students of Stanford University and UC Berkeley, who play in a long-running college football rivalry game also known as "the Big Game"—an event which pre-dates the Super Bowl by several decades. The NFL has also partaken in clean zone policies around Super Bowl sites to protect against saturation ambush marketing.

The XFL, a forthcoming rival league, floated a large blimp designed to resemble the XFL's signature red and black Spalding football over the Oakland Coliseum during an Oakland Raiders playoff game on January 6, 2001. The league intended to do so again on January 14 for the AFC championship game, but on the 9th, the blimp was let loose unmanned after a failed attempt to land it at Oakland International Airport, and it crashed over a waterfront restaurant on the Oakland Estuary after getting caught on a sailboat mast. The blimp sustained US$2.5 million worth of damage, and the incident was later considered to be an omen for the XFL's eventual failure.

In 2009 and 2010, Avid Life Media produced advertisements for its extramarital and homosexual online dating services Ashley Madison and ManCrunch, that it aimed to have aired during the Super Bowl. The Ashley Madison ad featured the tagline "Who Are You Doing After the Game?," while the ManCrunch ad culminated with two male football fans kissing and dry humping each other. Both ads were rejected by the game's respective broadcasters; the Ashley Madison ad for objectionable content, and the ManCrunch ad for its unauthorized use of NFL trademarks. An Avid Life Media spokesperson, as well as the media, initially reported that the ManCrunch ad had actually been rejected because of its homosexual themes. Critics felt that the company was engaging in ambush marketing by intentionally submitting ads that would be rejected by broadcasters, and thus earn free publicity from the resulting "controversy" without having to pay for the ad time itself. The company denied this was the case, and stated that it had serious intentions to purchase the ad time if the commercials were approved.

In October 2014, the NFL fined player Colin Kaepernick for wearing pink-colored Beats headphones (in observance of National Breast Cancer Awareness Month) during a post-game press conference, violating rules that prohibit players from displaying the logos of non-sponsors during games, practices, and pre/post-game media appearances. His actions infringed the exclusive sponsorship rights of Bose Corporation, who had become an official sponsor of the NFL as of the 2014 season. In response to the fine, Kaepernick covered the Beats logo on the headphones with athletic tape during a subsequent press conference.

Prior to Super Bowl XLIX in Glendale, Arizona, the NFL filed an opposition to a trademark application for "Superb Owl", filed by the organizers of a local running event known as The Night Run. They had planned to hold a "Superb Owl Shuffle 5K" event on the morning of the game, in reference to the "Superb Owl" awards given out during The Night Run. The NFL felt that the trademark was likely to cause confusion with its Super Bowl trademarks, also noting that the event's website, superbowlshuffle.org, was confusingly similar to "Super Bowl Shuffle". The euphemism "Superb Owl" had also appeared as the result of user typos on search queries for the game, on the television series The Colbert Report as a satire of the NFL's trademark rules, and during the vandalism of commemorative statues that were put up in San Francisco during the lead-up to Super Bowl 50.

Individual teams may have their own ambush marketing restrictions. A clause in the lease agreement on the Buffalo Bills' Orchard Park stadium, which is owned by Erie County, New York, gives the Governor of New York veto power over any naming rights agreement in addition to the county's right to approve or reject any renaming, so that no company with an embarrassing name would buy the rights. A bidet company attempted an ambush marketing stunt on the stadium in 2020 after New Era Cap Company announced its intent to withdraw from the agreement it had held since 2016; the Erie County executive rejected the proposal out of hand.

=== Minneapolis sports venues ===
In September 2010, the Minnesota Timberwolves basketball team announced that they would install a large billboard sign for Sanford Health on the exterior of Target Center. The sign was placed so that it would be visible from within Target Field, home stadium of the Minnesota Twins baseball team. The Twins have a competing healthcare sponsorship with the Mayo Clinic. Although it is a city-owned venue, the Timberwolves had the right to sell advertising on the exterior of the arena. Twins president Dave St. Peter stated that the size of the sign was "shocking", while the timing of the change was criticized for occurring right before the start of the 2010 Major League Baseball postseason, which would bring national exposure to the venue and the sign. In October 2011, per an extension of Target Corporation's naming rights for the arena, the company was given control over its exterior. The Sanford Health sign was replaced by a new display featuring Target's dog mascot Bullseye, which animates after Twins home runs.

The Minnesota Vikings' U.S. Bank Stadium faced a similar controversy. As the Minneapolis offices of Wells Fargo, a rival to the new stadium's naming rights sponsor U.S. Bank, are located within the vicinity of the stadium, Wells Fargo agreed to only install "non-mounted," non-illuminated signage on its building, such as letters painted directly onto the roof. After the original agreement was reached, Wells Fargo had asked the team to allow the installation of "raised, illuminated lettering. mounted on beams more than a foot above the roof rather than painted on the roof as agreed upon". Such signage would be visible in overhead views of U.S. Bank Stadium (such as camera shots during event telecasts). Wells Fargo threatened to light the entire rooftops of its offices if the Vikings chose to deny the requested change. In December 2015, the Vikings sued Wells Fargo for violating the agreement, after they began to construct an illuminated sign on their rooftop. On June 23, 2016, Judge Donovan W. Frank ruled in favor of the Vikings, and ordered Wells Fargo to remove the raised, illuminated signage.

=== Ambushes of Apple ===
In October 2011, Samsung ambushed the Australian launch of Apple's iPhone 4S smartphone by setting up a pop-up store near Sydney's Apple Store. At the store, the company sold its competing Galaxy S II to the first 10 people in line daily at a discount price of $2 AUD. Samsung similarly piggybacked the launch of its successor, the iPhone 5, to promote the Galaxy S III and Galaxy Note II; the company purchased keyword advertisements for the devices on major search engines, as well as Twitter and YouTube, thus causing ads for them to appear on searches relating to iPhone 5.

The Quebec-based home improvement chain Rona ambushed a billboard sign advertising another Apple product, the iPod Nano, by placing a banner for its paint recycling services that showed the paint from the devices in the Apple billboard above it falling into cans.

=== Cricket World Cup ===
Although the International Cricket Council does enforce trademark and ambush marketing rules surrounding events such as the Cricket World Cup, Quartz observed that the policies themselves were not as strict as those associated with other major sports bodies. The ICC does not ban the use of cricket-related imagery or the phrase "World Cup" to create associations with the event, although it still restricts the use of official ICC logos and trademarks.

During the 1996 Cricket World Cup, Pepsi aired a promotional campaign in India with the slogan "Nothing official about it", alluding to its long-time rival Coca-Cola being the official beverage sponsor. A writer for India's Economic Times considered the ads "perhaps one of the greatest examples of ambush marketing".

Prior to the 2019 Cricket World Cup, a hashtag campaign emerged on Twitter, "#GermanyCheersForIndia", which purported to feature German athletes and celebrities pledging support for the India national cricket team by wearing blue jerseys. However, it was later revealed that these posts were actually orchestrated by Volkswagen India—a competitor to the ICC's automotive sponsor Nissan—to promote "Cup Edition" models for several of its vehicles. Prior to the tournament's semi-final, Pepsi (who, as before, is not an ICC sponsor) signed Charulata Patel—an 87-year-old Londoner of Indian descent who had achieved viral notoriety earlier in the tournament for her presence at the India-Bangladesh match—to appear in an extension of its Har Ghoont Mein Swag (Swag in Every Sip) campaign. She was featured in marketing (including television and digital platforms, also including the service TikTok) promoting her as Pepsi's new "swag star", and its "fan anthem".

=== Premier Soccer League ===
In September 2018, the South African Premier Soccer League issued a complaint against the South African Football Association (SAFA) over a sponsorship it had reached with OUTsurance Holdings, under which it serves as a kit sponsor for all referees overseen by the association. The advertising deal is with SAFA itself, and was deemed conflicting with the PSL's sponsorships with ABSA Group and Nedbank. SAFA defended the practice, stating that under FIFA statutes as the governing body of football in South Africa, it had the right to appoint the officials used for any match, and that the sponsorship deal would "serve the best interests of our referees in our country so that the game of football is not only protected and developed but that it also grows from strength to strength."

The PSL withdrew a planned court action against SAFA the following month after a meeting with the governing body. A point of contention was a PSL referee's refusal to wear the sponsored kit during a Bloemfontein Celtic match, as he felt their green and purple colour scheme was too similar to the club's kit.

=== 2022 NCAA Division I men's basketball tournament ===
Peacock, the streaming service of US television network NBC, engaged in ambush marketing after Saint Peter's University, whose basketball team is nicknamed the Peacocks, scored a major upset of Kentucky in the 2022 NCAA Division I men's basketball tournament—an event televised in the US by a joint venture between two of the network's competitors, CBS and Turner. When NBC learned that Saint Peter's could not afford to send its cheerleading and dance teams to the Peacocks' second-round game in Indianapolis, it helped pay to transport the squads to that game, promoting this via Peacock's official Twitter account. After the Peacocks defeated Murray State in the second round, NBC and Peacock expanded their marketing efforts, arranging to provide an extra outlet for fans to purchase Saint Peter's merchandise, transporting more fans to their Sweet Sixteen game against Purdue in Philadelphia, flying a Peacock banner over the game venue, and providing free one-month Peacock subscriptions to Saint Peter's students. While a CBS spokesperson had no comment regarding its rival's support of Saint Peter's, CBS commentators did acknowledge it on-air.

== Impact ==
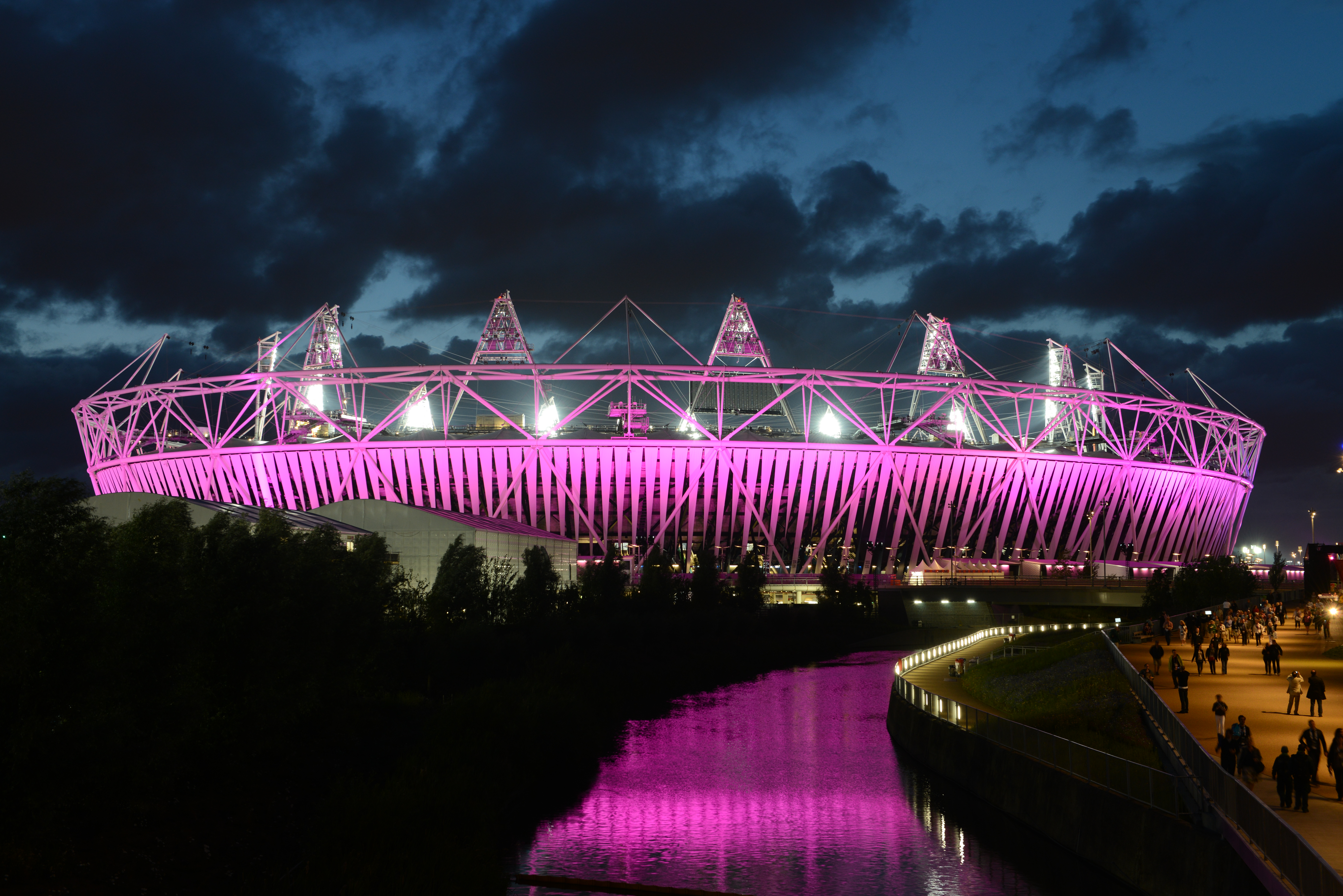
The organizers of the 2012 Summer Olympics (stadium pictured) received criticism for their "draconian" anti-ambush marketing rules.

Moves to control ambush marketing at events have been met with mixed reception: ambush marketing regulations enable the event organizer to prevent competitors from impeding on a company's exclusive rights to serve as an event's sponsor, thus making their sponsorship rights more lucrative. Laws enacted to control ambush advertising practices have proven to be controversial: critics have argued that ambush advertising regulations can inhibit free expression and prevent businesses (such as restaurants, sports bars, and pubs) from even mentioning an event, and that a country's existing trademark laws can be sufficient to protect organizers' intellectual property without granting them special powers.

The American Civil Liberties Union has opposed "clean zone" policies on several occasions; prior to both Super Bowl XLVII and the 2014 Major League Baseball All-Star Game, the organization respectively sued both the cities of New Orleans and Minneapolis for enforcing clean zone laws, arguing that they were unconstitutional for banning protected speech. In response to the lawsuit, New Orleans did amend its clean zone ordinance to allow non-commercial protected speech within the clean zones. The NFL has also received criticism for exaggerating the extent of its intellectual property rights under the laws of the United States, aggressively enforcing its trademarks, and failing to take the doctrine of fair use into account.

During the lead-up to the 2012 Summer Olympics, the London Organising Committee of the Olympic and Paralympic Games (LOCOG) showed an infamously aggressive stance towards enforcing anti-ambush advertising regulations. The organizing committee's policies and the London Olympic Games and Paralympic Games Act 2006 were criticized by local politicians, along with the Chartered Institute of Marketing, for being overly broad, "draconian," and unnecessary to enforce its exclusive trademark and sponsorship rights. The press described LOCOG as being a "branding police" due to these enforcement measures; EasyJet was told by a LOCOG representative that having Sally Gunnell reprise her pose with the Union Jack from the 1992 Games for an advertisement would constitute an unauthorized association, an art event known as The Great Exhibition 2012 received threats from LOCOG for merely containing "2012" in its name, and athletes were asked to report ambush advertising activities on a special website. In contrast, LOCOG allowed the restaurant chain Little Chef to continue selling its popular "Olympic Breakfast," owing to its long-standing use of the brand since 1994.

It was also argued by critics that LOCOG's policies made it unviable for smaller businesses to promote themselves using the Games, even in support of athletes, as they would need to evaluate whether their marketing materials violate the restrictions on unauthorized associations. Additionally, the architecture community strongly criticised the marketing restrictions, citing LOCOG's refusal to allow architectural firms to publicise their work on Olympic venues, including preventing the firms from entering national and international award competitions. LOCOG retained rights to all Olympic marks even after the end of the games until they were transferred to the British Olympic Association in 2013.

During the 2016 U.S. Olympic track and field trials, the apparel company Oiselle received demands by the United States Olympic Committee (USOC) to remove social media posts congratulating its sponsored athlete Kate Grace on qualifying for the 2016 Summer Olympics. The USOC considered them to be unauthorized "Olympic-related advertising" because the photos attached to the posts depicted USOC trademarks, including the Olympic rings and the phrase "Road to Rio". Company CEO Sally Bergesen stated that future posts would remove or obscure references to these trademarks, but argued that their depiction were incidental because the offending material appeared in the venue and on the bibs worn by all athletes at the event, making it intractable to avoid depicting them in photos taken there. She also defended the postings as being news reporting on the achievements of its sponsored athletes, and not necessarily promotion for the brand itself. The onerous restrictions on the promotion of Olympic athletes were one of the factors behind the National Hockey League's decision to prohibit its players from participating in the men's ice hockey tournaments at the 2018 Winter Olympics.

In an episode aired on the eve of the Games' opening ceremony, comedian Stephen Colbert discussed and satirized the aforementioned trademark claims on The Late Show. During the segment, Colbert presented an image of five CBS logos arranged and coloured like the Olympic rings, and promoted the show's new "sponsor", Musa Tea (said to be brewed in Morocco's Musa mountains)—whose official hashtag was "#teamusa" ("Tea Musa"). Colbert also satirized the NFL's "Super Bowl" trademarks in 2014 on his previous series, The Colbert Report, where he referred to the game as the "Superb Owl", and remarked that "we all know that the winner of the Big Game goes to Animated Mouse Theme Park."

== See also ==
- False advertising
- Guerrilla marketing
- Surrogate advertising
