= Little London, Jamaica =

Community in Jamaica

Coordinates: 18.2440°N 78.2077°W

Little London is a Town in the Little London District of Westmoreland Parish, Jamaica. It sits midway between the town of Negril to the north and the Parish Capital Savanna-la-Mar to the south.

Little London is a large community, and within the Little London District of Westmoreland parish in Jamaica. Other surrounding districts include: Revival, Delveland, Sheffield, Broughton, Big Bridge and Paul Island. Little Lond District boundaries The Town

Other surrounding communities included: Rattadam (also known as Grant Bush), New Hope, Mango Hall, Old Hope, Broughton, Bay Road, Lodge, McNeil Land and Collie Town.

Based on the latest census, Little London has close to 10,000 residents and is growing rapidly due to the close proximity to the two major towns. Over the last couple of years an influx of people have settled there looking for jobs in Negril.

Little London has a high school, primary school, infant school, health centre, police station, and post office. Electricity, piped water, telephone services are available throughout the community.
