= Knowledge Generation Bureau =

New York company

kgb
- Type: Privately held company
- Industry: Mobile search, directory assistance
- Predecessor: INFONXX
- Founded: 1992
- Founder: Robert Pines
- Headquarters: New York City, United States
- Area served: United States, Canada
- Key people: Robert Pines - Chairman and Chief Executive Officer
- Products: 118 118, Texperts, 542542 (kgbkgb)
- Owner: Robert Pines
- Subsidiaries: kgb USA, kgb.com, kgbkgb 118//Media, The Number 118 118; 118 218 Le Numero; 118 50, Conduit; Die Nummer 18 18; 892 892 Il Numero; Conduit, 118 811; Unnamed Canadian service
- Website: KGB.com

kgb (stylized in lower case) is a privately held, New York–based company that provides telephone directory assistance and enhanced information services across Europe and North America. It describes itself as "the world's largest independent provider of directory assistance and enhanced information services." Founded in 1992 by Robert Pines under the name INFONXX, the company rebranded in 2008. The term knowledge generation bureau is from an advertising copy line, and is not the name of the company, which is kgb.

In 2003, after the UK yellow pages directory market was opened, kgb launched 118 118 (UK), a UK directory enquiries provider.

After the success of 118 118 in the UK, kgb launched 118 218 in France when the French market opened. It became quickly and is still the most used directory assistance service in France, with around 200,000 calls each day on the phone number. Its 118218.fr website was in the top 100 French websites based on traffic.

In December 2008, kgb acquired Texperts, a United Kingdom–based firm, in order to benefit from their "innovative software platform and industry experience." Shortly afterwards, in January 2009, kgb launched a new suite of products in the United States, providing answers to customers' questions through multiple platforms. The first is through a mobile search service known as 542542 (kgbkgb). It launched on January 5, 2009, following the launch of the similar 118118 "Ask Us Anything" service in the United Kingdom. In February 2013, after investigation by the US Department of Labor, a judge ordered kgb to pay US$1.3 million to Internet researchers who had been sharply underpaid.

The company entered the Internet group buying space with a business called kgbdeals, seeking to offer lifestyle deals to consumers in the US, UK, France and Italy.

== 542542 (kgbkgb) ==
542542 is an "Ask Anything 2-way text service", whereby United States users can submit questions via SMS for a price of $1.49 per question.

== Class action lawsuit ==
In January 2013, kgb USA settled to pay $1.3 million in unpaid minimum wage and overtime wages to 14,000 current and former employees. The lawsuit alleged that from January 19, 2009 to December 4, 2012, kgb USA repeatedly violated the Fair Labor Standards Act (FLSA) by (1) misclassifying the Special Agents as independent contractors instead of employees, (2) failing to pay minimum wage and overtime amounts, and (3) failing to make, keep, and preserve adequate and accurate employment-related records of the "Special Agents."
