= ManCrunch =

ManCrunch is an online dating website specifically aimed at male homosexual relationships, owned by the Toronto-based Avid Life Media, the same company responsible for the Ashley Madison adultery service and other similarly unconventional dating sites. The site bills itself as a place "where many many many men come to play."

== Rejected Super Bowl advertisement ==
ManCrunch gained major publicity in January 2010 when it was revealed that CBS was considering a television advertisement the site had produced to air during Super Bowl XLIV. The ad featured a male Packers fan and a male Vikings fan reaching into the same bowl of chips at the same time, and after a brief pause, passionately kissing and dry humping each other, much to the surprise of the other man present. The advertisement was initially put on a waiting list before the network outright rejected it due to it violating CBS's broadcast standards and because CBS believed ManCrunch's did not have sufficient credit (ability to pay for the ad). ManCrunch accused CBS of discrimination saying, "If the ad showed a man and woman kissing it would have been accepted." The New York Post concluded it was "no more racy than nearly any beer commercial not starring the Budweiser Clydesdales." The ad was accused of being a form of ambush marketing by analysts, who theorized that the company knew the advertisement would be rejected by CBS, thus drawing free publicity to the site without needing to pay the extremely high rates for advertising during the Super Bowl.

In July 2015—after data from Avid Life Media's sites (including ManCrunch) was hacked and leaked online—comedy writer Kristen Bartlett wrote an essay for Someecards about her work in Television Standards & Practices. Bartlett wrote the report rejecting the ad, and shortly after sending the report, Avid Life Media published a press release, including her name, phone number and the confidential report, all of which led to her being branded "a homophobe" online. Bartlett wrote that the reason she rejected the ad's content was not because it contained two men kissing, but because it did so in a manner exploiting gay men: "The entire premise is how funny and weird it is that two guys would make out. How gross, right? .... Gay sex is reduced to a ploy for cheap laughs." Bartlett also considered the ad submission to be a marketing ploy; noting the fact that the two men in the ad were wearing Packers and Vikings jerseys, she wrote that the jerseys appeared to be a safeguard that would guarantee the ad would be rejected. "In order to show NFL jerseys, clients have to spend a lot of money to obtain licensing. Now, I'm not saying that Avid Life didn't spend a fortune to use those jerseys. But I will say that they definitely didn't send me any releases."

== See also ==
- Homosocialization
