= National symbols of the Netherlands =

Symbols of the Netherlands are items or symbols that have symbolic meaning to, or represent, the Netherlands. These symbols are seen in official capacities, such as flags, coats of arms, postage stamps, and currency, and in URLs. They appear less formally as recurring themes in literature, art and folk art, heraldry, monuments, clothing, personal decoration, and as the names of parks, bridges, streets, and clubs. The less formal manifestations may be classified as national emblems.

== Official symbols ==
=== Flag ===
The Flag of the Netherlands

=== Coat of arms ===
Arms of the Dutch Republic

==== Dutch Republic Lion ====
The Dutch Republic Lion originates from the House of Nassau's coat of arms. The sword and sheaf of arrows in the lion’s paws come from States General of the Republic of the United Provinces coat of arms. The seven arrows stand for the seven united provinces of the States-General and also symbolise the power of cooperation.

=== Other ===
The colour orange has long been associated with the Netherlands due to Willem van Orange.

Other things commonly associated with the Netherlands include tulips, clogs, Gouda cheese and windmills.
