= AskMeNow =

AskMeNow Inc.
- Type: Public
- Industry: Search
- Founded: November 2005
- Defunct: 2008
- Fate: Dissolved
- Headquarters: Irvine, California
- Area served: North America
- Key people: Darryl Cohen - CEO
- Products: S3 - Enterprise Semantic Search Solution
- Services: SMS-based question answering, mobile content distribution, mobile advertising
- Revenue: ▲US$54,536 (FY 2007)
- Operating income: ▲US$-9.428 million (FY 2007)
- Net income: ▲US$-20.435 million (FY 2007)
- Total assets: ▼US$645,110 (FY 2007)
- Total equity: ▼US$-4.894 Million (FY 2007)
- Number of employees: 32 (Dec 2007)

AskMeNow Inc. was an American public corporation, specializing in mobile search and mobile advertising. The Irvine, California based company officially launched in November 2005 and ceased operations in late 2008. AskMeNow's primary offering was a consumer mobile search product based on proprietary technology that offered a natural language based interaction and dynamic content provision platform.

== AskWiki ==
AskMeNow signed a partnership agreement with the Wikimedia Foundation to bring natural language processing to English Wikipedia. The beta product, AskWiki, integrated some of the semantic web and natural language features of AskMeNow into English Wikipedia searches. The AskWiki engine was able to parse natural language statements and return specific answers rather than just relevant articles. The contract between AskMeNow and Wikimedia was rescinded after Jimmy Wales announced his own for profit search engine named Wikia.

== Partnerships ==
AskMeNow partnered with a variety of content publishers to offer mobile access to these publishers’ content. These partnerships included National Hockey League, Merriam-Webster, Encyclopædia Britannica, and Guinness World Records.

AskMeNow had established distribution partnerships with Alltel in the US and Rogers Wireless and Bell Mobility in Canada.
