= List of youngest members of the United States Congress =

The following are historical lists of the youngest members of the United States Congress, in both the House of Representatives and the Senate. These members would be the equivalent to the "Baby of the House" in the parliaments of Commonwealth countries; the U.S. Congress does not confer a similar title upon its youngest members.

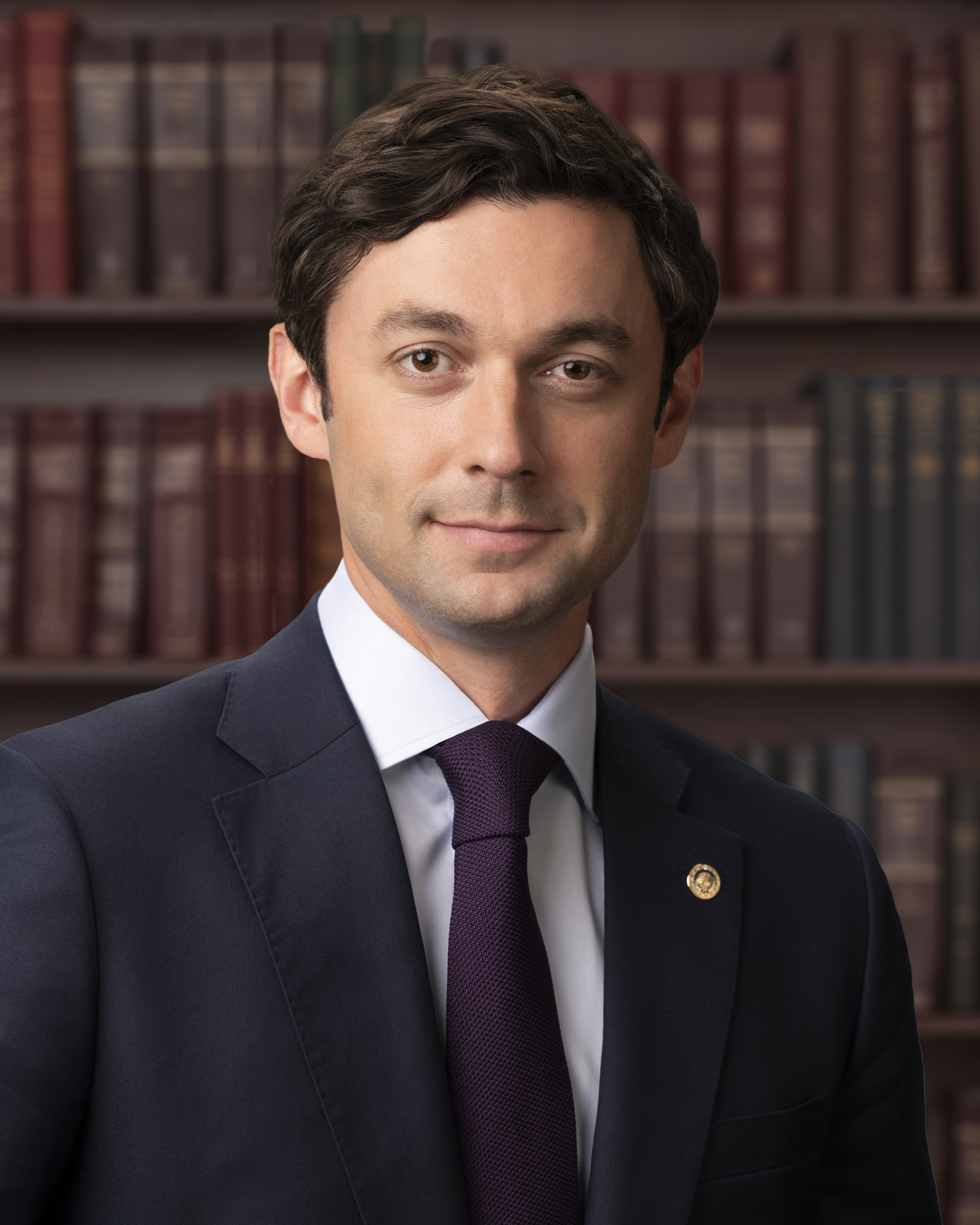
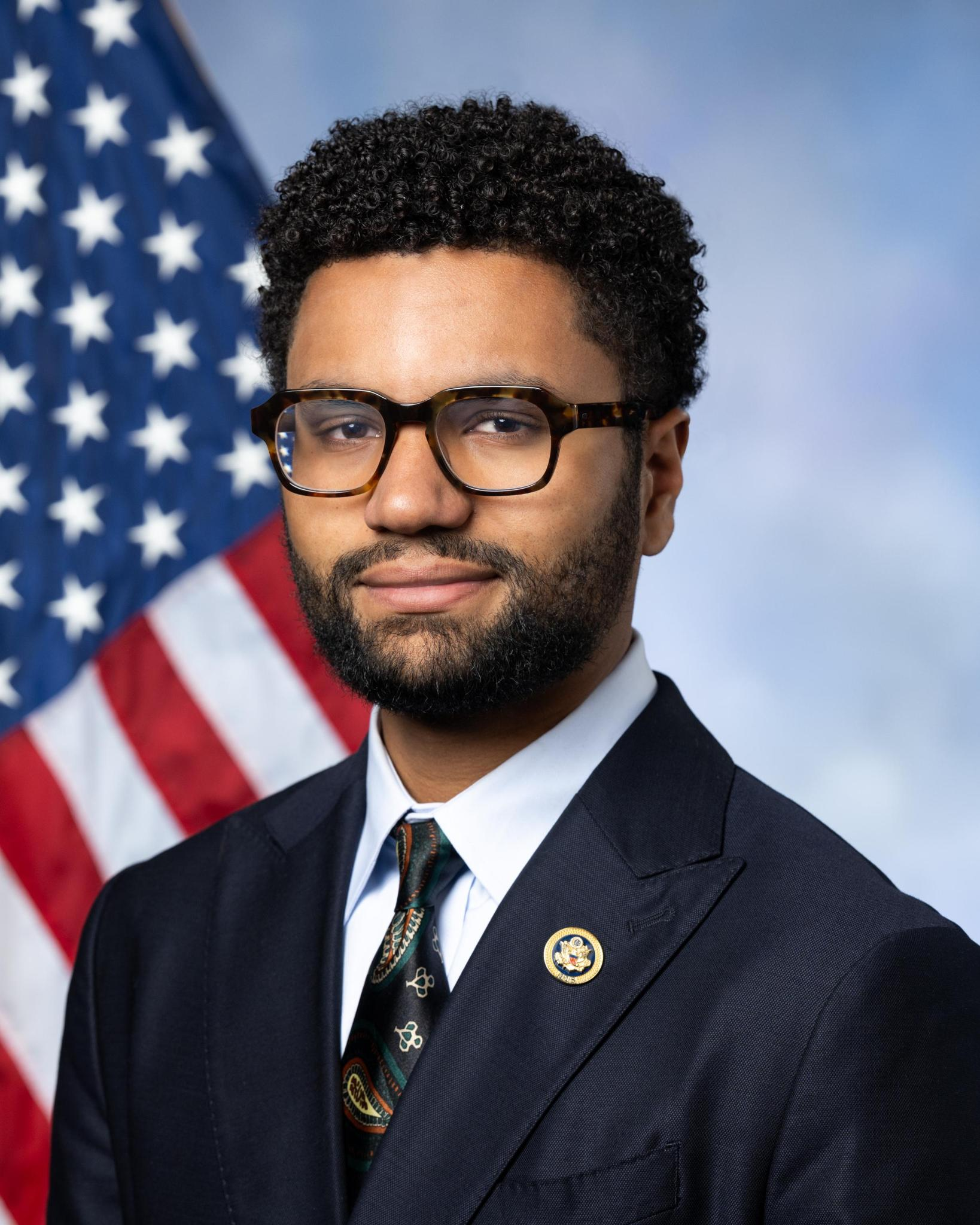
Left: Jon Ossoff, age 39, currently the youngest U.S. senator
Right: Maxwell Frost, age 29, currently the youngest U.S. representative

The youngest U.S. congressman tends to be older than the youngest MPs in Commonwealth countries. This is partly because the minimum age requirements enumerated in Article One of the United States Constitution bar persons under the age of 25 years and 30 years from serving in the House and Senate, respectively. Additionally, the political culture of the United States encourages young politicians to gain experience in state and local offices before running for Congress. Although the vast majority of members of Congress gained state and local experience before being elected to Congress, members without such experience have increased recently.

Maxwell Frost is the youngest member of the 119th Congress at age 29. He succeeded one-term representative Madison Cawthorn, who was the youngest person elected to the U.S. Congress since Jed Johnson Jr. in 1964, the second-youngest congressman in United States history. Michael Alfonso will become the new youngest member when he takes his seat in January 2027 at age 26.

Jon Ossoff is the youngest sitting senator at 39, replacing Josh Hawley, who had been the youngest senator of the 116th Congress at age 41. Ossoff is the youngest person elected to the U.S. Senate since Don Nickles in 1980. James Talarico will become the new youngest senator when he takes his seat in January 2027 at age 37. The average age of U.S. Senators slightly declined to 63 years following the 2026 Midterm Elections, with the average age of the nineteen arriving senators (54.7 years) being younger than the average age of the nineteen departing senators (69.3 years). In the 19th century, several state legislatures elected senators in their late twenties despite the Constitutional minimum age of 30, such as Henry Clay, who was sworn into office at age 29, and John Henry Eaton, the youngest U.S. senator in history, who took his oath of office when he was 28 years, 4 months and 29 days old.

== List of youngest U.S. senators ==
For senators elected to a regular session, the starting date is the date on which the new Congress convened. From 1789 to 1935, this is March 4 (with the previous Congress ending on March 3); from 1937 onward, this is January 3.

For senators appointed to a vacancy or elected in a special election, the starting date represents their swearing-in date.

Duration as youngest	Name	State	Party	Start age	End age
March 4, 1789 – July 25, 1789	James Gunn	GA	Anti-Administration	35 years, 356 days	36 years, 134 days
July 25, 1789 – December 6, 1790	Rufus King	NY	Pro-Administration	34 years, 123 days	35 years, 257 days
December 6, 1790 – March 4, 1791	James Monroe	VA	Anti-Administration	32 years, 222 days	32 years, 310 days
March 4, 1791 – December 2, 1793	John Rutherfurd	NJ	Pro-Administration	30 years, 165 days	33 years, 73 days
December 2, 1793 – February 28, 1794	Albert Gallatin (Note: Some resources regard Gallatin only as a senator-elect because of the challenge to his credentials, hence Rutherfurd could be considered the youngest official senator during this period. Gallatin was ultimately disqualified from service.)	PA	Anti-Administration	32 years, 307 days	33 years, 30 days
February 28, 1794 – April 24, 1794	John Rutherfurd	NJ	Pro-Administration	33 years, 161 days	33 years, 216 days
April 24, 1794 – December 6, 1796	James Ross	PA	Federalist	31 years, 286 days	34 years, 147 days
April 12, 1796 – December 6, 1796 (Note: Tattnall's precise birthdate in 1762 is unknown. Since both he and Ross were born the same year, they are both credited with the designation for youngest for the period from the swearing-in of Tattnall in April 1796 until the swearing-in of Stockton in December 1796, who was younger than both.)	Josiah Tattnall	GA	Democratic-Republican	33–34	33–34
December 6, 1796 – November 22, 1797	Richard Stockton	NJ	Federalist	32 years, 233 days	33 years, 219 days
November 22, 1797 – April 1, 1798	Andrew Jackson	TN	Democratic-Republican	30 years, 252 days	31 years, 17 days
April 1, 1798 – February 4, 1799	Ray Greene	RI	Federalist	33 years, 58 days	34 years, 2 days
February 4, 1799 – March 3, 1801	William Wells	DE	Federalist	30 years, 28 days	32 years, 56 days
March 4, 1801 – October 17, 1803	Samuel White	DE	Federalist	30 years, 93 days	32 years, 320 days
October 17, 1803 – December 29, 1806	Thomas Worthington	OH	Democratic-Republican	30 years, 93 days	33 years, 166 days
December 29, 1806 – March 4, 1807	Henry Clay (Note: Clay was elected and served in the U.S. Senate while under the Constitutional age requirement of 30 at the age of 29 years.)	KY	Democratic-Republican	29 years, 261 days	29 years, 326 days
March 4, 1807 – September 1807	James Fenner	RI	Democratic-Republican	36 years, 41 days	36 years, 222 days
September 1807 – December 9, 1807	Samuel White	DE	Federalist	36 years, 274 days	37 years, 8 days
December 9, 1807 – January 12, 1810	William Crawford	GA	Democratic-Republican	35 years, 288 days	37 years, 322 days
May 26, 1809 – January 12, 1810 (Note: Whiteside's precise birth date in 1772 is unknown. Since both he and Crawford were born the same year, they are both credited with the designation for youngest for the period from the swearing-in of Whiteside in 1809 until the swearing-in of Campbell in 1810, who was younger than both.)	Jenkin Whiteside	TN	Democratic-Republican	36–37	37–38
January 12, 1810 – March 3, 1813	Alexander Campbell	OH	Democratic-Republican	30–31	33–34
March 4, 1813 – May 27, 1813	Outerbridge Horsey	DE	Federalist	35 years, 364 days	36 years, 80 days
May 24, 1813 – May 27, 1813 (Note: Bulloch's precise birth date in 1777 is unknown. Since both he and Horsey were born the same year, they are both credited with the designation for youngest for the three days from Bulloch's swearing-in until the swearing-in of Goldsborough, who was younger than both.)	William Bulloch	GA	Democratic-Republican	35–36	35–36
May 27, 1813 – December 6, 1813	Robert Goldsborough	MD	Federalist	34 years, 143 days	34 years, 336 days
December 6, 1813 – April 9, 1814	William Bibb (Note: Bibb was the first person to be both the youngest member of the U.S. House and the youngest senator.) (Note: Also held title of youngest member of the U.S. House.)	GA	Democratic-Republican	32 years, 65 days	32 years, 189 days
April 9, 1814 – February 2, 1815	Jesse Wharton	TN	Democratic-Republican	31 years, 254 days	32 years, 188 days
February 2, 1815 – January 22, 1816	William Barry	KY	Democratic-Republican	30 years, 362 days	31 years, 351 days
January 22, 1816 – March 3, 1817	Armistead Mason (Note: Mason was elected and served in the U.S. Senate while under the Constitutional age requirement of 30 at the age of 28 years, 5 months.)	VA	Democratic-Republican	28 years, 171 days	29 years, 212 days
March 4, 1817 – November 16, 1818	John Crittenden (Note: Crittenden was elected and served in the U.S. Senate while under the Constitutional age requirement of 30 at the age of 29 years.)	KY	Democratic-Republican	29 years, 175 days	31 years, 67 days
November 16, 1818 – March 3, 1821	John Eaton (Note: Eaton was elected and served in the U.S. Senate while under the Constitutional age requirement of 30. At 28 years, 4 months, he was the youngest ever to serve in that body.)	TN	Democratic-Republican	28 years, 151 days	30 years, 259 days
March 4, 1821 – December 3, 1821	Samuel Southard	NJ	Democratic-Republican	33 years, 268 days	34 years, 177 days
December 3, 1821 – March 3, 1823	John Eaton	TN	Democratic-Republican	31 years, 168 days	32 years, 259 days
March 4, 1823 – March 3, 1825	Robert Hayne	SC	Democratic-Republican	31 years, 114 days	33 years, 114 days
March 4, 1825 – March 3, 1829	Elias Kane	IL	Jacksonian	30 years, 270 days	34 years, 270 days
March 4, 1829 – December 16, 1833	John Clayton	DE	Anti-Jacksonian	32 years, 223 days	37 years, 145 days
December 16, 1833 – December 31, 1833	Lewis Linn	MO	Jacksonian	37 years, 41 days	37 years, 56 days
December 31, 1833 – March 3, 1835	John King	GA	Jacksonian	34 years, 272 days	35 years, 335 days
March 4, 1835 – December 5, 1836	Robert Walker	MS	Jacksonian	33 years, 228 days	35 years, 139 days
December 5, 1836 – February 2, 1837	Ambrose Sevier	AR	Jacksonian	35 years, 31 days	35 years, 90 days
February 2, 1837 – March 3, 1837	Alexandre Mouton	LA	Jacksonian	32 years, 75 days	32 years, 105 days
March 4, 1837 – January 11, 1841	Franklin Pierce	NH	Democratic	32 years, 101 days	36 years, 49 days
January 11, 1841 – February 7, 1842	Alfred Nicholson	TN	Democratic	32 years, 133 days	33 years, 160 days
February 7, 1842 – February 28, 1842	Franklin Pierce	NH	Democratic	37 years, 76 days	37 years, 97 days
February 28, 1842 – March 1, 1842	Alexandre Mouton	LA	Democratic	37 years, 101 days	37 years, 102 days
March 1, 1842 – April 14, 1842	William Graham	NC	Whig	37 years, 177 days	37 years, 221 days
April 14, 1842 – July 6, 1842	Charles Conrad	LA	Whig	37 years, 111 days	37 years, 194 days
July 6, 1842 – March 3, 1843	William Dayton	NJ	Whig	35 years, 139 days	36 years, 15 days
March 4, 1843 – December 4, 1843	Ned Hannegan	IN	Democratic	35 years, 252 days	36 years, 162 days
December 4, 1843 – March 3, 1845	David Atchison	MO	Democratic	36 years, 115 days	37 years, 205 days
March 4, 1845 – March 3, 1847	Jesse Bright	IN	Democratic	32 years, 76 days	34 years, 76 days
March 4, 1847 – June 26, 1848	Stephen Douglas	IL	Democratic	33 years, 315 days	35 years, 64 days
June 26, 1848 – December 14, 1853	Isaac Walker	WI	Democratic	32 years, 237 days	38 years, 42 days
December 14, 1853 – March 3, 1855	Clement Clay	AL	Democratic	37 years, 1 day	38 years, 81 days
March 3, 1855 – March 5, 1860	George Pugh	OH	Democratic	32 years, 96 days	37 years, 98 days
March 5, 1860 – January 22, 1863	Milton Latham	CA	Democratic	32 years, 287 days	35 years, 244 days
January 22, 1863 – March 3, 1863	David Turpie	IN	Democratic	34 years, 198 days	34 years, 239 days
March 4, 1863 – June 23, 1868	William Sprague	RI	Republican	32 years, 173 days	37 years, 285 days
June 23, 1868 – June 30, 1868	Alexander McDonald	AR	Republican	36 years, 74 days	36 years, 81 days
June 30, 1868 – July 25, 1868	Thomas Osborn	FL	Republican	35 years, 113 days	35 years, 138 days
July 25, 1868 – March 3, 1873	George Spencer	AL	Republican	31 years, 267 days	36 years, 123 days
March 4, 1873 – March 3, 1879	Stephen Dorsey	AR	Republican	31 years, 4 days	37 years, 4 days
March 4, 1879 – March 3, 1881	Blanche Bruce (Note: Bruce became the first non-white youngest senator.)	MS	Republican	38 years, 3 days	40 years, 3 days
March 4, 1881 – October 11, 1881	Arthur Gorman	MD	Democratic	41 years, 358 days	42 years, 214 days
October 11, 1881 – March 3, 1883	Nelson Aldrich	RI	Republican	39 years, 339 days	41 years, 118 days
March 4, 1883 – December 2, 1889	John Kenna	WV	Democratic	34 years, 328 days	41 years, 236 days
December 2, 1889 – March 3, 1891	Richard Pettigrew	SD	Republican	41 years, 132 days	42 years, 224 days
March 4, 1891 – January 24, 1895	John Irby	SC	Democratic	36 years, 175 days	40 years, 136 days
January 24, 1895 – March 3, 1895	Jeter Pritchard	NC	Republican	37 years, 196 days	37 years, 235 days
March 4, 1895 – March 3, 1901	Marion Butler	NC	Populist	31 years, 288 days	37 years, 288 days
March 4, 1901 – March 3, 1905 (Note: Beveridge and Bailey were both born on October 6, 1862.)	Albert Beveridge	IN	Republican	38 years, 149 days	42 years, 149 days
March 4, 1901 – March 3, 1905	Joseph W. Bailey	TX	Democratic	38 years, 149 days	42 years, 149 days
March 4, 1905 – January 30, 1907	Elmer Burkett	NE	Republican	37 years, 93 days	39 years, 60 days
January 30, 1907 – March 3, 1907	Frederick Mulkey	OR	Republican	33 years, 24 days	33 years, 57 days
March 4, 1907 – December 11, 1907	Simon Guggenheim	CO	Republican	39 years, 64 days	39 years, 346 days
December 11, 1907 – December 26, 1907	Thomas Gore	OK	Democratic	37 years, 1 day	37 years, 16 days
December 26, 1907 – March 22, 1908	William Bryan (Note: Bryan was the youngest U.S. senator to die in office, at the age of 31.)	FL	Democratic	31 years, 77 days	31 years, 164 days
March 22, 1908 – January 9, 1911	Thomas Gore	OK	Democratic	37 years, 103 days	40 years, 30 days
January 9, 1911 – January 31, 1911	Davis Elkins	WV	Republican	34 years, 350 days	35 years, 7 days
January 31, 1911 – March 3, 1911	Thomas Gore	OK	Democratic	40 years, 52 days	40 years, 84 days
March 4, 1911 – March 3, 1917	Luke Lea	TN	Democratic	31 years, 326 days	37 years, 326 days
March 4, 1917 – July 8, 1918	Peter Gerry	RI	Democratic	37 years, 167 days	38 years, 293 days
July 8, 1918 – November 5, 1918	Christie Benet	SC	Democratic	38 years, 194 days	38 years, 314 days
November 5, 1918 – March 3, 1919	Peter Gerry	RI	Democratic	39 years, 48 days	39 years, 167 days
March 4, 1919 – March 3, 1923	Pat Harrison	MS	Democratic	37 years, 187 days	41 years, 187 days
March 4, 1923 – March 3, 1925	Clarence Dill	WA	Democratic	38 years, 164 days	40 years, 164 days
March 4, 1925 – December 7, 1925	Sam Bratton	NM	Democratic	36 years, 197 days	37 years, 110 days
December 7, 1925 – January 12, 1933	Bob La Follette Jr.	WI	Republican	30 years, 304 days	37 years, 341 days
January 12, 1933 – June 21, 1935	Richard Russell	GA	Democratic	35 years, 71 days	37 years, 231 days
June 21, 1935 – October 17, 1940	Rush Holt (Note: Holt was the youngest popularly elected senator at 29 years and 4 months in November 1934. He was not permitted to take the oath of office until after his 30th birthday in June 1935.)	WV	Democratic	30 years, 2 days	35 years, 120 days
October 17, 1940 – December 12, 1940	Joseph Ball	MN	Republican	34 years, 349 days	35 years, 39 days
December 12, 1940 – December 6, 1942	Berkeley Bunker	NV	Democratic	34 years, 122 days	36 years, 116 days
December 6, 1942 – January 3, 1943	Henry Lodge	MA	Republican	40 years, 154 days	40 years, 182 days
January 3, 1943 – November 14, 1944	Joseph Ball	MN	Republican	37 years, 61 days	39 years, 11 days
November 14, 1944 – January 3, 1945	William Jenner	IN	Republican	36 years, 116 days	36 years, 166 days
January 3, 1945 – January 18, 1945	Joseph Ball	MN	Republican	39 years, 61 days	39 years, 76 days
January 18, 1945 – August 26, 1945	Hugh Mitchell	WA	Democratic	37 years, 302 days	38 years, 157 days
August 26, 1945 – January 3, 1947	William Knowland	CA	Republican	37 years, 61 days	38 years, 191 days
January 3, 1947 – December 31, 1948	Joseph McCarthy	WI	Republican	38 years, 50 days	40 years, 47 days
December 31, 1948 – January 3, 1957	Russell Long (Note: Long held the longest uninterrupted tenure as youngest U.S. senator, eight years and three days. He was surpassed by Nickles in overall time, but Nickles's tenure was interrupted.)	LA	Democratic	30 years, 58 days	38 years, 61 days
January 3, 1957 – June 15, 1961	Frank Church	ID	Democratic	32 years, 162 days	36 years, 325 days
June 15, 1961 – December 7, 1961	John Tower	TX	Republican	35 years, 259 days	36 years, 69 days
December 7, 1961 – November 6, 1962	Moe Murphy	NH	Republican	34 years, 65 days	35 years, 35 days
November 7, 1962 – January 3, 1969	Ted Kennedy	MA	Democratic	30 years, 258 days	36 years, 316 days
January 3, 1969 – January 2, 1971	Bob Packwood	OR	Republican	36 years, 114 days	38 years, 113 days
January 2, 1971 – January 3, 1973	John Tunney	CA	Democratic	36 years, 190 days	38 years, 191 days
January 3, 1973 – January 3, 1979	Joe Biden (Note: Biden was elected at the age of 29 years, 11 months, but turned 30 before the start of his term.)	DE	Democratic	30 years, 44 days	36 years, 44 days
January 3, 1979 – January 3, 1981	Bill Bradley	NJ	Democratic	35 years, 159 days	37 years, 159 days
January 3, 1981 – March 11, 1987	Don Nickles (Note: Nickles served the longest period as the youngest senator, ten years, two months and eight days, though this combined tenure was interrupted by Karnes, who was six days younger, from 1987 to 1989. Long served the longest such period uninterrupted, eight years and three days.)	OK	Republican	32 years, 28 days	38 years, 95 days
March 11, 1987 – January 3, 1989	David Karnes	NE	Republican	38 years, 89 days	40 years, 22 days
January 3, 1989 – January 3, 1993	Don Nickles	OK	Republican	40 years, 28 days	44 years, 28 days
January 3, 1993 – January 3, 1995	Russ Feingold	WI	Democratic	39 years, 307 days	41 years, 307 days
January 3, 1995 – January 3, 1999	Rick Santorum	PA	Republican	36 years, 238 days	40 years, 238 days
January 3, 1999 – January 3, 2003	Peter Fitzgerald	IL	Republican	38 years, 75 days	42 years, 75 days
January 3, 2003 – January 3, 2009	John Sununu	NH	Republican	38 years, 115 days	44 years, 115 days
January 3, 2009 – January 22, 2009	Mark Pryor (Note: Pryor set the record as the oldest youngest senator in the body's history, at 45 years.)	AR	Democratic	45 years, 359 days	46 years, 12 days
January 22, 2009 – January 27, 2009	Michael Bennet	CO	Democratic	44 years, 55 days	44 years, 60 days
January 27, 2009 – September 10, 2009	Kirsten Gillibrand	NY	Democratic	42 years, 49 days	42 years, 275 days
September 10, 2009 – July 20, 2010	George LeMieux	FL	Republican	40 years, 112 days	41 years, 60 days
July 20, 2010 – November 15, 2010	Carte Goodwin	WV	Democratic	36 years, 143 days	36 years, 261 days
November 15, 2010 – January 3, 2011	George LeMieux	FL	Republican	41 years, 178 days	41 years, 227 days
January 3, 2011 – December 26, 2012	Mike Lee	UT	Republican	39 years, 213 days	41 years, 205 days
December 26, 2012 – January 3, 2013	Brian Schatz	HI	Democratic	40 years, 67 days	40 years, 75 days
January 3, 2013 – January 3, 2015	Chris Murphy	CT	Democratic	39 years, 153 days	41 years, 153 days
January 3, 2015 – January 3, 2019	Tom Cotton	AR	Republican	37 years, 235 days	41 years, 235 days
January 3, 2019 – January 20, 2021	Josh Hawley	MO	Republican	39 years, 3 days	41 years, 20 days
January 20, 2021 – present	Jon Ossoff	GA	Democratic	33 years, 339 days	39 years, 276 days

== List of youngest U.S. representatives ==
For representatives elected to a regular session, the starting date is the date at which the new Congress convened. From 1789 to 1935, this is March 4 (with the previous Congress ending on March 3); from 1937 onward, this is January 3.

For representatives elected in a special election, the starting date represents their swearing-in date.

Duration as youngest	Congress	Name	District	Party	Start age (Note: Until about the 34th Congress and rarely after, some members did not have birth years or birthdates listed. The approximate age of those members has been attempted to be ascertained using available biographical descriptions, although some of these descriptions were very limited. If more than one member had a birth year but not birthdate listed, both have been credited with being the youngest during the period (until the next confirmed younger member was sworn-in).)	End age
March 4, 1789 – April 19, 1790	1st	Richard Lee	VA-04	Pro-Administration	28 years, 43 days	29 years, 89 days
April 19, 1790 – March 3, 1793	1st–2nd	John Steele	NC-04, 01	Pro-Administration	25 years, 154 days	28 years, 108 days
March 4, 1793 – March 3, 1795	3rd	Francis Preston	VA-04	Anti-Administration	27 years, 214 days	29 years, 214 days
March 4, 1795 – May 5, 1796	4th	Nathaniel Freeman	MA-05	Federalist	28 years, 307 days	30 years, 4 days
May 5, 1796 – March 3, 1797	4th	Richard Sprigg	MD-02	Democratic-Republican	26–27	27–28
March 4, 1797 – November 23, 1797	5th	John Dennis	MD-08	Federalist	25 years, 77 days	25 years, 341 days
November 23, 1797 – March 3, 1801	5th–6th	William Claiborne (Note: Claiborne was the youngest-ever elected and seated member of Congress at approximately the age of 22, despite being below the Constitutional age requirement.)	TN-AL	Democratic-Republican	21–22	25–26
March 4, 1801 – December 6, 1802	7th	John Stanly	NC-10	Federalist	26 years, 329 days	28 years, 241 days
December 6, 1802 – March 3, 1803	7th	Samuel Thatcher	MA-12	Federalist	26 years, 158 days	26 years, 246 days
March 4, 1803 – March 4, 1805	8th–9th	John Jackson	VA-01	Democratic-Republican	25 years, 163 days	27 years, 163 days
March 4, 1805 – December 1, 1806	9th	John Claiborne	VA-17	Democratic-Republican	27 years, 37 days	28 years, 309 days
December 1, 1806 – January 26, 1807	9th	William Burwell	VA-13	Democratic-Republican	26 years, 261 days	26 years, 317 days
January 26, 1807 – March 3, 1807	9th	William Bibb (Note: Also held title of youngest member of the U.S. Senate.)	GA-AL	Democratic-Republican	25 years, 116 days	25 years, 153 days
March 4, 1807 – March 3, 1809	10th	Jesse Wharton (Note: Although Wharton was 24 at the time of the official start of the 10th Congress in March 1807, it did not convene until October 1807 after he turned 25.)	TN-03	Democratic-Republican	24 years, 218 days	26 years, 218 days
March 4, 1809 – November 27, 1809	11th	William Bibb	GA-AL	Democratic-Republican	27 years, 153 days	28 years, 56 days
November 27, 1809 – March 3, 1811	11th	Jonathan Jennings	IN-AL (Note: Indiana was not yet a state and this member was a non-voting U.S. Delegate.)	Democratic-Republican	25 years, 245 days	26 years, 342 days
March 4, 1811 – November 4, 1811	12th	William King (Note: Although King was 24 at the time of the official start of the 12th Congress in March 1811, it did not convene until November 1811 after he turned 25.)	NC-05	Democratic-Republican	24 years, 331 days	25 years, 211 days
November 4, 1811 – March 3, 1815	12th–13th	Stevenson Archer	MD-06	Democratic-Republican	25 years, 24 days	28 years, 144 days
March 4, 1815 – December 17, 1816	14th	Richard Wilde	GA-AL	Democratic-Republican	25 years, 161 days	27 years, 84 days
December 17, 1816 – March 3, 1817	14th	John Tyler	VA-23	Democratic-Republican	26 years, 263 days	26 years, 340 days
March 4, 1817 – December 4, 1818	15th	George Robertson	KY-07	Democratic-Republican	26 years, 106 days	28 years, 16 days
December 4, 1818 – March 3, 1819	15th	John McLean	IL-AL	Democratic-Republican	27 years, 303 days	28 years, 28 days
March 4, 1819 – March 3, 1823 (Note: During part of the 17th Congress, credited Cook and Govan with sharing the title of youngest member. Both were born in 1794, but birthdate for Cook was unknown, so credited both.)	16th–17th	Daniel Cook	IL-AL	Democratic-Republican	24–25	28–29
December 4, 1822 – March 3, 1823	17th	Andrew Govan	SC-04	Democratic-Republican	28 years, 325 days	29 years, 50 days
March 4, 1823 – March 3, 1825	18th	Thomas Moore	KY-07	Democratic-Republican	25–26	27–28
March 4, 1825 – March 3, 1827	19th	John Bryan	NC-04	Jacksonian	26 years, 120 days	28 years, 120 days
March 4, 1827 – February 13, 1828	20th	William Nuckolls	SC-07	Jacksonian	26 years, 9 days	26 years, 355 days
February 13, 1828 – March 3, 1829	20th	Ambrose Sevier	AR-AL (Note: Arkansas was not yet a state and Sevier was a non-voting U.S. Delegate.)	Jacksonian	26 years, 101 days	27 years, 120 days
March 4, 1829 – March 3, 1831 (Note: Lewis and Pettis were both born in 1802, but unknown birthdate for Pettis, so credited both with youngest for the 21st Congress.)	21st	Dixon Lewis	AL-03	Jacksonian	26 years, 206 days	28 years, 206 days
March 4, 1829 – March 3, 1831	21st	Spencer Pettis	MO-AL	Jacksonian	26–27	28–29
March 4, 1831 – March 3, 1833	22nd	Albert Hawes	KY-11	Jacksonian	26 years, 337 days	28 years, 337 days
March 4, 1833 – March 3, 1835	23rd	David Dickinson (Note: Although Dickinson was 24 at the time of the official start of the 23rd Congress in March 1833, it did not convene until November 1833 after he turned 25.)	TN-08	Jacksonian	24 years, 267 days	26 years, 267 days
March 4, 1835 – March 3, 1837	24th	John Claiborne	MS-AL	Jacksonian	25 years, 314 days	27 years, 314 days
March 4, 1837 – March 3, 1839	25th	Joseph Williams	TN-03	Whig	26 years, 132 days	28 years, 132 days
March 4, 1839 – March 3, 1841	26th	Albert Brown	MS-AL	Democratic	25 years, 277 days	27 years, 277 days
March 4, 1841 – March 3, 1843	27th	John Mason	MD-06	Democratic	25 years, 299 days	27 years, 299 days
March 4, 1843 – March 3, 1845	28th	Alexander Ramsey	PA-14	Whig	27 years, 177 days	29 years, 177 days
March 4, 1845 – March 3, 1847	29th	Lucien Chase	TN-09	Democratic	27 years, 89 days	29 years, 89 days
March 4, 1847 – March 3, 1849	30th	Richard Donnell	NC-08	Whig	26 years, 165 days	28 years, 165 days
March 4, 1849 – March 3, 1851	31st	James Orr	SC-02	Democratic	26 years, 296 days	28 years, 296 days
March 4, 1851 – March 3, 1853	32nd	William Churchwell	TN-03	Democratic	25 years, 12 days	27 years, 12 days
March 4, 1853 – March 3, 1855	33rd	Milton Latham	CA-AL	Democratic	25 years, 285 days	27 years, 285 days
March 4, 1855 – July 23, 1856	34th	William Cumback	IN-04	People's	25 years, 345 days	27 years, 121 days
July 23, 1856 – March 3, 1857	34th	Miguel Otero (Note: Otero was the first Hispanic youngest member of the U.S. House.)	NM-AL (Note: New Mexico was not yet a state and Otero was a non-voting U.S. Delegate.)	Democratic	27 years, 32 days	27 years, 256 days
March 4, 1857 – December 3, 1860	35th–36th	Albert Jenkins (Note: Although Brown was elected at the start of the 36th Congress, being just 24 at the time of the election, he was not permitted to take his seat until the second session in December 1860 after his 25th birthday, so Jenkins retained the title of youngest until Brown's swearing-in.)	VA-11	Democratic	26 years, 114 days	30 years, 23 days
December 3, 1860 – March 3, 1861	36th	John Brown	KY-05	Democratic	25 years, 158 days	25 years, 249 days
March 4, 1861 – January 13, 1862	37th	Edward McPherson	PA-17	Republican	30 years, 216 days	31 years, 166 days
January 13, 1862 – March 3, 1863	37th	Andrew Clements	TN-04	Union	29 years, 21 days	30 years, 71 days
March 4, 1863 – March 3, 1865	38th	John McBride	OR-AL	Republican	30 years, 194 days	32 years, 194 days
March 3, 1865 – March 3, 1867	39th	Thomas Noell (Note: Noell was elected as a Republican to the 39th Congress and reelected to the 40th Congress as a Democrat.)	MO-03	Republican	25 years, 335 days	27 years, 335 days
March 4, 1867 – October 3, 1867	40th	Thomas Noell (Note: Noell was the youngest known member of Congress to die in office at 28 while holding the youngest title.)	MO-03	Democratic	27 years, 335 days	28 years, 183 days
October 3, 1867 – June 24, 1868	40th	Charles Haight	NJ-02	Democratic	29 years, 272 days	30 years, 172 days
June 24, 1868 – March 3, 1869	40th	Logan Roots	AR-01	Republican	27 years, 90 days	27 years, 343 days
March 4, 1869 – March 31, 1870	41st	Clinton Cobb	NC-01	Republican	26 years, 191 days	27 years, 218 days
March 31, 1870 – March 3, 1871	41st	John Conner	TX-02	Democratic	27 years, 178 days	28 years, 151 days
March 4, 1871 – January 29, 1873	42nd	Josiah Walls (Note: Walls was the first Black youngest member of the U.S. House.)	FL-AL	Republican	28 years, 64 days	30 years, 20 days
January 29, 1873 – March 3, 1873	42nd	John Conner	TX-02	Democratic	30 years, 107 days	30 years, 151 days
March 4, 1873 – March 3, 1875	43rd	John Smith	VA-03	Republican	25 years, 162 days	27 years, 162 days
March 4, 1875 – March 3, 1877	44th	John White	KY-09	Republican	26 years, 47 days	28 years, 47 days
March 4, 1877 – February 20, 1878	45th	John Kenna	WV-03	Democratic	28 years, 328 days	29 years, 316 days
February 20, 1878 – March 3, 1879	45th	Joseph Acklen	LA-03	Democratic	27 years, 276 days	28 years, 288 days
March 4, 1879 – March 3, 1881	46th	Richard Frost	MO-03	Democratic	27 years, 65 days	29 years, 65 days
March 4, 1881 – March 3, 1883	47th	Henry Dugro	NY-07	Democratic	25 years, 152 days	27 years, 152 days
March 4, 1883 – December 1, 1884	48th	George Post	PA-15	Democratic	28 years, 184 days	30 years, 91 days
December 1, 1884 – March 3, 1885	48th	Benjamin Shively (Note: Shively was elected to a vacancy in the 48th Congress as an Anti-Monopolist/Greenbacker-supported candidate. He was elected to the 50th Congress as a Democrat.)	IN-13	Anti-Monopoly	27 years, 256 days	27 years, 349 days
March 4, 1885 – February 2, 1887	49th	Bob La Follette	WI-03	Republican	29 years, 263 days	31 years, 233 days
February 2, 1887 – March 3, 1887	49th	Hugh Price	WI-08	Republican	27 years, 62 days	27 years, 92 days
March 4, 1887 – March 3, 1889	50th	Benjamin Shively	IN-13	Democratic	29 years, 349 days	31 years, 349 days
March 4, 1889 – December 9, 1889	51st	Thomas Magner	NY-05	Democratic	28 years, 361 days	29 years, 276 days
December 9, 1889 – March 3, 1891	51st	Charles Turner	NY-06	Democratic	28 years, 197 days	29 years, 282 days
March 4, 1891 – May 5, 1892	52nd	Joseph W. Bailey	TX-05	Democratic	28 years, 149 days	29 years, 212 days
May 5, 1892 – March 3, 1893	52nd	Joseph Kendall	KY-10	Democratic	28 years, 359 days	29 years, 296 days
March 4, 1893 – March 3, 1895	53rd	Thomas Settle	NC-05	Republican	27 years, 359 days	29 years, 359 days
March 4, 1895 – December 19, 1896	54th	Norman Mozley	MO-14	Republican	29 years, 83 days	31 years, 8 days
December 19, 1896 – March 3, 1897	54th	Charles Crisp	GA-03	Democratic	26 years, 61 days	26 years, 136 days
March 4, 1897 – March 3, 1899	55th	Thomas Bradley	NY-09	Democratic	27 years, 61 days	29 years, 61 days
March 4, 1899 – March 3, 1901	56th	John Fitzgerald	NY-02	Democratic	26 years, 359 days	28 years, 359 days
March 4, 1901 – March 3, 1903	57th	John Feely	IL-02	Democratic	25 years, 215 days	27 years, 215 days
March 4, 1903 – March 3, 1905	58th	Burton French	ID-AL	Republican	27 years, 215 days	29 years, 215 days
March 4, 1905 – March 3, 1907	59th	Anthony Michalek	IL-05	Republican	27 years, 47 days	29 years, 47 days
March 4, 1907 – March 3, 1909	60th	Harry Wolf	MD-03	Democratic	26 years, 261 days	28 years, 261 days
March 4, 1909 – November 23, 1909	61st	Charles Edwards	GA-01	Democratic	30 years, 245 days	31 years, 144 days
November 23, 1909 – March 3, 1911	61st	Manuel Quezon	PH-AL (Note: As the Philippines was a territory of the U.S., Quezon was a non-voting member of Congress.)	Nacionalista	31 years, 96 days	32 years, 197 days
March 4, 1911 – June 2, 1911	62nd	James Byrnes	SC-02	Democratic	28 years, 306 days	29 years, 31 days
June 2, 1911 – March 3, 1913	62nd	William Reyburn	PA-02	Republican	28 years, 167 days	30 years, 77 days
March 4, 1913 – December 7, 1914	63rd	Clyde Kelly	PA-30	Republican	29 years, 212 days	31 years, 125 days
December 7, 1914 – March 3, 1915	63rd	Carl Vinson	GA-10	Democratic	31 years, 19 days	31 years, 106 days
March 4, 1915 – March 3, 1917	64th	Thomas Miller	DA-AL	Republican	28 years, 251 days	30 years, 251 days
March 4, 1917 – August 10, 1917	65th	Marvin Jones	TX-13	Democratic	35 years, 6 days	35 years, 165 days
August 10, 1917 – August 19, 1919	65th–66th	John Baer	ND-01	Republican	31 years, 134 days	33 years, 143 days
August 19, 1919 – December 6, 1920	66th	King Swope	KY-08	Republican	26 years, 9 days	27 years, 118 days
December 6, 1920 – March 3, 1921	66th	Clarence McLeod	MI-13	Republican	25 years, 156 days	25 years, 244 days
March 4, 1921 – March 3, 1923	67th	Thomas Ryan	NY-15	Republican	32 years, 260 days	34 years, 260 days
March 4, 1923 – March 3, 1925	68th	Clarence McLeod	MI-13	Republican	27 years, 244 days	29 years, 244 days
March 4, 1925 – March 3, 1927	69th	Samuel Montgomery	OK-01	Republican	28 years, 93 days	30 years, 93 days
March 4, 1927 – March 3, 1929	70th	George Combs	MO-05	Democratic	27 years, 306 days	29 years, 306 days
March 4, 1929 – March 7, 1932	71st–72nd	Fred Hartley	NJ-08	Republican	27 years, 10 days	30 years, 14 days
March 7, 1932 – March 3, 1933	72nd	Carlton Mobley	GA-06	Democratic	25 years, 91 days	26 years, 87 days
March 4, 1933 – January 3, 1935	73rd	Joseph Monaghan	MT-01	Democratic	26 years, 343 days	28 years, 283 days
January 3, 1935 – January 3, 1937	74th	Elmer Ryan	MN-02	Democratic	27 years, 222 days	29 years, 222 days
January 3, 1937 – January 3, 1939	75th	Jerry O'Connell	MT-01	Democratic	27 years, 203 days	29 years, 203 days
January 3, 1939 – January 3, 1941	76th	Lindley Beckworth	TX-03	Democratic	25 years, 187 days	27 years, 187 days
January 3, 1941 – January 3, 1943	77th	William Stratton	IL-AL	Republican	26 years, 312 days	28 years, 311 days
January 3, 1943 – January 21, 1943	78th	Lindley Beckworth	TX-03	Democratic	29 years, 187 days	29 years, 205 days
January 21, 1943 – January 3, 1947	78th–79th	Marion T. Bennett	MO-06	Republican	28 years, 229 days	32 years, 211 days
January 3, 1947 – December 4, 1948	80th	George Sarbacher	PA-05	Republican	27 years, 95 days	29 years, 65 days
December 4, 1948 – January 3, 1949	80th	Lloyd Bentsen (Note: Bentsen served the shortest period as the youngest member of the U.S. House at just 31 days.)	TX-15	Democratic	27 years, 297 days	27 years, 327 days
January 3, 1949 – January 3, 1951	81st	Hugo Sims	SC-02	Democratic	27 years, 81 days	29 years, 81 days
January 3, 1951 – January 3, 1953	82nd	Patrick Hillings	CA-12	Republican	27 years, 318 days	29 years, 319 days
January 3, 1953 – January 3, 1955	83rd	William Wampler	VA-09	Republican	26 years, 277 days	28 years, 277 days
January 3, 1955 – December 13, 1955	84th	Kenneth Gray	IL-25	Democratic	30 years, 50 days	31 years, 29 days
December 13, 1955 – January 3, 1959	84th–85th	John Dingell	MI-15	Democratic	29 years, 158 days	32 years, 179 days
January 3, 1959 – January 3, 1961	86th	Dan Rostenkowski	IL-08	Democratic	31 years, 1 day	33 years, 1 day
January 3, 1961 – January 3, 1963	87th	Ralph Harding	ID-02	Democratic	31 years, 116 days	33 years, 116 days
January 3, 1963 – May 12, 1964	88th	Ed Foreman	TX-16	Republican	29 years, 12 days	30 years, 142 days
May 12, 1964 – January 3, 1965	88th	William Green	PA-05	Democratic	25 years, 323 days	26 years, 193 days
January 3, 1965 – January 3, 1967	89th	Jed Johnson	OK-06	Democratic	25 years, 7 days	27 years, 7 days
January 3, 1967 – April 3, 1969	90th–91st	William Green	PA-05	Democratic	28 years, 193 days	30 years, 283 days
April 3, 1969 – November 16, 1970	91st	Dave Obey	WI-07	Democratic	30 years, 182 days	32 years, 44 days
November 16, 1970 – January 3, 1971	91st	Robert Steele	CT-02	Republican	32 years, 13 days	32 years, 61 days
January 3, 1971 – April 29, 1971	92nd	Dawson Mathis	GA-02	Democratic	30 years, 34 days	30 years, 150 days
April 29, 1971 – October 12, 1972	92nd	Mendel Davis	SC-01	Democratic	28 years, 188 days	29 years, 355 days
October 12, 1972 – January 3, 1975	92nd–93rd	John Breaux	LA-07	Democratic	28 years, 225 days	30 years, 308 days
January 3, 1975 – January 3, 1977	94th	Thomas Downey	NY-02	Democratic	25 years, 340 days	27 years, 341 days
January 3, 1977 – January 3, 1979	95th	Nick Rahall	WV-04	Democratic	27 years, 228 days	29 years, 228 days
January 3, 1979 – January 3, 1981	96th	James Shannon	MA-05	Democratic	26 years, 274 days	28 years, 274 days
January 3, 1981 – January 3, 1983	97th	John LeBoutillier	NY-06	Republican	27 years, 222 days	29 years, 222 days
January 3, 1983 – January 3, 1985 (Note: Perkins was elected to Congress to fill a vacancy on November 6, 1984, and was younger than titleholder Cooper, but owing to the 98th Congress having adjourned sine die, he was not sworn-in until the 99th Congress, by which time Rowland, who was younger than Perkins, claimed the title. Cooper is credited until the end of the 98th Congress as an official congressman, as opposed to a congressman-elect, but Perkins is noted due to the unusual circumstances.)	98th	Jim Cooper	TN-04	Democratic	28 years, 198 days	30 years, 198 days
November 6, 1984 – January 3, 1985	98th	Carl Perkins	KY-07	Democratic	30 years, 92 days	30 years, 150 days
January 3, 1985 – March 20, 1990	99th–101st	John Rowland (Note: Rowland served the longest period as the youngest member of the U.S. House at 5 years, 2 months.)	CT-05	Republican	27 years, 224 days	32 years, 300 days
March 20, 1990 – January 3, 1991	101st	Susan Molinari (Note: Molinari was the first woman to hold the title of youngest member of the U.S. House.)	NY-14	Republican	31 years, 358 days	32 years, 282 days
January 3, 1991 – January 3, 1993	102nd	Jim Nussle	IA-02	Republican	30 years, 190 days	32 years, 190 days
January 3, 1993 – January 3, 1995	103rd	Cleo Fields	LA-04	Democratic	30 years, 42 days	32 years, 42 days
January 3, 1995 – January 3, 1997	104th	Patrick Kennedy	RI-01	Democratic	27 years, 173 days	29 years, 173 days
January 3, 1997 – January 3, 2001	105th–106th	Harold Ford Jr.	TN-09	Democratic	26 years, 237 days	30 years, 237 days
January 3, 2001 – January 3, 2005	107th–108th	Adam Putnam	FL-12	Republican	26 years, 156 days	30 years, 156 days
January 3, 2005 – January 3, 2009	109th–110th	Patrick McHenry	NC-10	Republican	29 years, 73 days	33 years, 73 days
January 3, 2009 – January 3, 2013	111th–112th	Aaron Schock	IL-18	Republican	27 years, 220 days	31 years, 220 days
January 3, 2013 – January 3, 2015	113th	Patrick Murphy	FL-18	Democratic	29 years, 279 days	31 years, 279 days
January 3, 2015 – January 3, 2019	114th–115th	Elise Stefanik	NY-21	Republican	30 years, 185 days	34 years, 185 days
January 3, 2019 – January 3, 2021	116th	Alexandria Ocasio-Cortez (Note: Ocasio-Cortez is the youngest woman ever elected to Congress and the first Hispanic woman to hold the title of youngest member.)	NY-14	Democratic	29 years, 82 days	31 years, 82 days
January 3, 2021 – January 3, 2023	117th	Madison Cawthorn	NC-11	Republican	25 years, 155 days	27 years, 155 days
January 3, 2023 – present	118th–119th	Maxwell Frost	FL-10	Democratic	25 years, 351 days	29 years, 306 days

== See also ==
- Age of candidacy laws in the United States
- Dean of the United States House of Representatives
- Dean of the United States Senate
