= United States House Financial Services Subcommittee on Domestic Monetary Policy and Technology =

Defunct subcommittee of the U.S. House of Representatives

The U.S. House Financial Services Subcommittee on Domestic Monetary Policy and Technology was a subcommittee of the House Committee on Financial Services. The committee was formerly part of the Subcommittee on Domestic and International Monetary Policy, Trade, and Technology until the 111th Congress, when a separate Subcommittee on International Monetary Policy and Trade was created. At the start of the 113th Congress in 2013, the subcommittees were reorganized, and domestic monetary policy jurisdiction was moved to the newly formed Subcommittee on Monetary Policy and Trade.

== Jurisdiction ==
The jurisdiction of the Subcommittee on Domestic Monetary Policy and Technology included—

(i) financial aid to all sectors and elements within the economy;

(ii) economic growth and stabilization;

(iii) defense production matters as contained in the Defense Production Act of 1950, as amended;

(iv) domestic monetary policy, and agencies which directly or indirectly affect domestic monetary policy, including the effect of such policy and other financial actions on interest rates, the allocation of credit, and the structure and functioning of domestic financial institutions [such as the Federal Reserve System];

(v) coins, coinage, currency, and medals, including commemorative coins and medals, proof and mint sets and other special coins, the Coinage Act of 1965, gold and silver, including the coinage thereof (but not the par value of gold), gold medals, counterfeiting, currency denominations and design, the distribution of coins, and the operations of the Bureau of the Mint and the Bureau of Engraving and Printing; and

(vi) development of new or alternative forms of currency.

== Members, 112th Congress ==
In December 2010, Bloomberg Businessweek reported that incoming Speaker of the House John Boehner was considering ways to prevent Ron Paul, who has long been a critic of Ben Bernanke and the Federal Reserve System, from becoming chair of the subcommittee or restrict his authority. Paul had stated that he would use the position to draw attention to the Fed's policies and what he perceived to be its negative consequences.

Majority	Minority
Ron Paul, Texas, Chairman; Walter B. Jones Jr., North Carolina, Vice Chairman; Frank Lucas, Oklahoma; Patrick McHenry, North Carolina; Blaine Luetkemeyer, Missouri; Bill Huizenga, Michigan; Nan Hayworth, New York; David Schweikert, Arizona	Lacy Clay, Missouri, Ranking Member; Carolyn Maloney, New York; Gregory Meeks, New York; Al Green, Texas; Emanuel Cleaver, Missouri; Gary Peters, Michigan
