= United States House Financial Services Subcommittee on Domestic and International Monetary Policy, Trade, and Technology =

The U.S. House Financial Services Subcommittee on Domestic and International Monetary Policy, Trade, and Technology was a subcommittee of the House Committee on Financial Services. In the 111th Congress it was split into two subcommittees: Domestic Monetary Policy and Technology, and International Monetary Policy and Trade.

== Jurisdiction ==
The subcommittee's jurisdiction includes domestic monetary policy, and agencies which directly or indirectly affect domestic monetary policy, multilateral development lending institutions such as the World Bank, coins and currency including operations of the Bureau of the Mint and the Bureau of Engraving and Printing, and international trade and finance including all matters pertaining to the International Monetary Fund and the Export-Import Bank.

== Members, 110th Congress ==
Majority	Minority
Ron Paul, Chairman, Texas; Carolyn Maloney, New York; Maxine Waters, California; Paul Kanjorski, Pennsylvania; Brad Sherman, California; Gwen Moore, Wisconsin; Gregory Meeks, New York; Dennis Moore, Kansas; Lacy Clay, Missouri; Keith Ellison, Minnesota; Charles Wilson, Ohio; Robert Wexler, Florida; Jim Marshall, Georgia; Dan Boren, Oklahoma; André Carson, Indiana	Michael Castle, Delaware; Frank Lucas, Oklahoma; Steve LaTourette, Ohio; Donald Manzullo, Illinois; Walter B. Jones, North Carolina; Jeb Hensarling, Texas; Tom Price, Georgia; Patrick McHenry, North Carolina; Michele Bachmann, Minnesota; Peter Roskam, Illinois; Kenny Marchant, Texas
