= 1948 United States Senate election in Minnesota =

- November 2, 1948
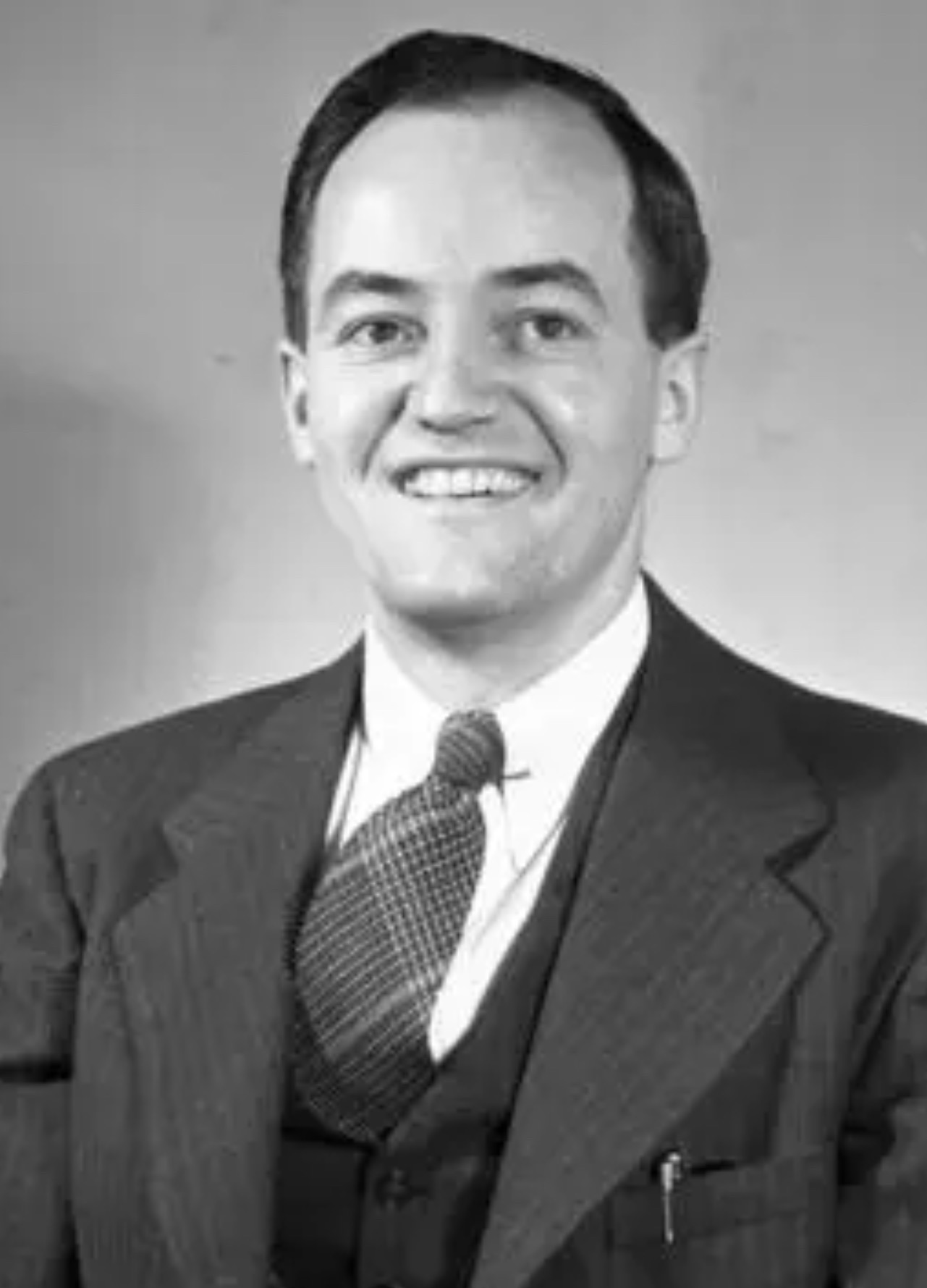

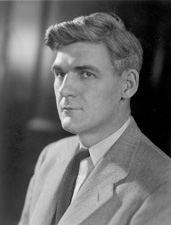
Nominee	Hubert H. Humphrey	Joseph H. Ball
Party	Democratic (DFL)	Republican
Popular vote	729,494	485,801
Percentage	59.78%	39.81%
- County results Humphrey: 50–60% 60–70% 70–80% Ball: 50–60% 60–70%
U.S. senator before election
Joseph H. Ball
Republican
Elected U.S. Senator
Hubert H. Humphrey
Democratic (DFL)

The 1948 United States Senate election in Minnesota took place on November 2, 1948. It was the first election held for Minnesota's Class 2 seat in the United States Senate since the Minnesota Democratic Party and the Farmer-Labor Party of Minnesota merged in 1944 to form the Minnesota Democratic-Farmer-Labor Party. Democratic Mayor of Minneapolis and future Vice President Hubert H. Humphrey defeated incumbent Republican Joseph H. Ball, who sought a third term in the Senate. This was the first time a Democrat won a Senate seat in Minnesota through a popular vote election, as they last held a seat in 1901, and last won this seat in 1859.

== Democratic–Farmer-Labor primary ==
=== Candidates ===
==== Declared ====
- Hubert H. Humphrey, Mayor of Minneapolis since 1945
- James M. Shields

=== Results ===
Democratic primary election results
Party	Candidate	Votes	%
Democratic (DFL)	Hubert H. Humphrey	204,175	89.07%
Democratic (DFL)	James M. Shields	25,051	10.93%
Total votes		229,226	100.00%

== Republican primary ==
=== Candidates ===
==== Declared ====
- Joseph H. Ball, Incumbent U.S. Senator since 1943 (also 1940–1942)
- Lenore Irene Bussmann
- Earl L. Miller

=== Results ===
Republican primary election results
Party	Candidate	Votes	%
Republican	Joseph H. Ball (Incumbent)	269,594	79.42%
Republican	Earl L. Miller	51,801	15.26%
Republican	Lenore Irene Bussmann	18,060	5.32%
Total votes		339,455	100.00%

== General election ==
=== Results ===
General election results
Party	Candidate	Votes	%
Democratic (DFL)	Hubert H. Humphrey	729,494	59.78%
Republican	Joseph H. Ball (Incumbent)	485,801	39.81%
Socialist Workers	Vincent R. Dunne	4,951	0.41%
Total votes		1,220,246	100.00%
Majority		243,693	19.97%
Democratic (DFL) gain from Republican			

== See also ==
- United States Senate elections, 1948 and 1949
