= United States House Financial Services Subcommittee on National Security, Illicit Finance and International Financial Institutions =

Subcommittee of Committee on Financial Services
- Active United States House of Representatives; 119th Congress

Leadership
- Chair: Warren Davidson (R)
- Ranking Member: Joyce Beatty (D)

Structure
- Seats: 18 (18 currently filled) 10/10 8/8
- Political parties: Majority (10): Republican (10); Minority (8): Democratic (8)

Meeting place
- 2129, Rayburn House Office Building; Washington, D.C. 20515

Phone number
- (202)-225-7502

The United States House Financial Services Subcommittee on National Security, Illicit Finance and International Financial Institutions is a subcommittee of the House Committee on Financial Services. It was formerly part of the Subcommittee on Domestic and International Monetary Policy, Trade, and Technology until the 111th Congress, when a separate Subcommittee on Domestic Monetary Policy and Technology was created. In the 113th Congress, the two subcommittees' jurisdictions were again merged, but domestic monetary policy was again removed from its jurisdiction at the start of the 118th Congress.

== Jurisdiction ==
The subcommittee's jurisdiction includes domestic monetary policy, and agencies which directly or indirectly affect domestic monetary policy; multilateral development institutions such as the World Bank; coins and currency, including operations of the United States Mint and the Bureau of Engraving and Printing; and international trade and finance including all matters pertaining to the International Monetary Fund and the Export-Import Bank of the United States.

== Members, 119th Congress ==
Majority	Minority
Warren Davidson, Ohio, Chair; Zach Nunn, Iowa, Vice Chair; Frank Lucas, Oklahoma; Pete Sessions, Texas; Andy Barr, Kentucky; Roger Williams, Texas; Young Kim, California; Andy Ogles, Tennessee; Lisa McClain, Michigan; María Elvira Salazar, Florida	Joyce Beatty, Ohio, Ranking Member; Vicente Gonzalez, Texas; Sean Casten, Illinois; Bill Foster, Illinois; Juan Vargas, California; Josh Gottheimer, New Jersey; Ritchie Torres, New York; Sam Liccardo, California
Ex officio
French Hill, Arkansas	Maxine Waters, California

== Historical membership rosters ==
=== 118th Congress ===
Majority	Minority
Blaine Luetkemeyer, Missouri, Chair; Andy Barr, Kentucky; Roger Williams, Texas; Barry Loudermilk, Georgia; Dan Meuser, Pennsylvania; Young Kim, California,Vice Chair; Zach Nunn, Iowa; Monica De La Cruz, Texas; Andy Ogles, Tennessee	Joyce Beatty, Ohio, Ranking Member; Vicente Gonzalez, Texas; Wiley Nickel, North Carolina; Brittany Pettersen, Colorado; Bill Foster, Illinois; Juan Vargas, California; Josh Gottheimer, New Jersey
Ex officio
Patrick McHenry, North Carolina	Maxine Waters, California

=== 117th Congress ===
Majority	Minority
Jim Himes, Connecticut, Chair; Josh Gottheimer, New Jersey, Vice Chair; Michael San Nicolas, Guam; Ritchie Torres, New York; Stephen Lynch, Massachusetts; Madeleine Dean, Pennsylvania; Alexandria Ocasio-Cortez, New York; Jesús "Chuy" García, Illinois; Jake Auchincloss, Massachusetts	French Hill, Arkansas, Ranking Member; Lee Zeldin, New York; Roger Williams, Texas; Tom Emmer, Minnesota; Warren Davidson, Ohio; Anthony Gonzalez, Ohio; Van Taylor, Texas, Vice Ranking Member
Ex officio
Maxine Waters, California	Patrick McHenry, North Carolina

=== 116th Congress ===
Majority	Minority
Emanuel Cleaver, Missouri, Chair; Ed Perlmutter, Colorado; Jim Himes, Connecticut; Denny Heck, Washington; Brad Sherman, California; Juan Vargas, California; Josh Gottheimer, New Jersey; Michael San Nicolas, Guam; Ben McAdams, Utah; Jennifer Wexton, Virginia; Stephen Lynch, Massachusetts; Tulsi Gabbard, Hawaii; Chuy García, Illinois	French Hill, Arkansas, Ranking Member; Frank Lucas, Oklahoma; Roger Williams, Texas; Tom Emmer, Minnesota; Anthony Gonzalez, Ohio; John Rose, Tennessee; Denver Riggleman, Virginia, Vice Ranking Member; William Timmons, South Carolina; Van Taylor, Texas
Ex officio
Maxine Waters, California	Patrick McHenry, North Carolina

=== 115th Congress ===
Majority	Minority
Andy Barr, Kentucky, Chairman; Roger Williams, Texas, Vice Chair; Frank Lucas, Oklahoma; Bill Huizenga, Michigan; Robert Pittenger, North Carolina; Mia Love, Utah; French Hill, Arkansas; Tom Emmer, Minnesota; Alex Mooney, West Virginia; Warren Davidson, Ohio; Claudia Tenney, New York; Trey Hollingsworth, Indiana	Gwen Moore, Wisconsin, Ranking Member; Gregory Meeks, New York; Bill Foster, Illinois; Brad Sherman, California; Al Green, Texas; Denny Heck, Washington; Dan Kildee, Michigan; Juan Vargas, California; Charlie Crist, Florida
Ex officio
Jeb Hensarling, Texas	Maxine Waters, California
