= Business Roundtable =

American nonprofit association

- Abbreviation: BRT
- Type: Trade association Business lobbying Public relations Nonprofit association
- Website: www.businessroundtable.org

The Business Roundtable (BRT) is a nonprofit lobbyist association based in Washington, D.C. whose members are chief executive officers of major U.S. companies. Unlike the United States Chamber of Commerce, whose members are entire businesses, BRT members are exclusively CEOs. The BRT lobbies for public policy that is favorable to business interests, such as lowering corporate taxes in the U.S. and internationally, as well as international trade policy like the North American Free Trade Agreement.

In 2019, the BRT redefined its definition of the purpose of a corporation as participating in stakeholder capitalism, putting the interests of employees, customers, suppliers, and communities on par with shareholders. The BRT's board members include, as of 2024, chair Chuck Robbins of Cisco (CEO); former White House chief of staff Joshua Bolten; Mary Barra of General Motors; Tim Cook of Apple; and Jamie Dimon of JPMorgan Chase.

== History ==
On October 13, 1972, the March Group, co-founded by Alcoa chairman John D. Harper and General Electric CEO Fred Borch, the Construction Users Anti-Inflation Roundtable, founded by retired United States Steel CEO Roger Blough, and the Labor Law Study Group (LLSG) merged to form the Business Roundtable. Politically conservative and originated to resist the growing power of unions in the 1960s, especially construction unions.

The March Group consisted of chief executive officers who met informally to consider public policy issues; the Construction Users Anti-Inflation Roundtable was devoted to containing construction costs; and the Labor Law Study Committee was largely made up of labor relations executives of major companies. Harper was the newly founded group's first president, followed by Thomas Murphy of General Motors, Irving Shapiro of DuPont, then Clifford Garvin of Exxon.

In 2010, The Washington Post characterized the group as President Barack Obama's "closest ally in the business community."

On August 19, 2019, the BRT redefined its 1997 definition of the purpose of a corporation, replacing its bedrock principle that shareholder interests must be placed above all else, as defined in 1970 by conservative economist and Nobel economics laureate Milton Friedman and promoted during the 1980s in the teachings and writings of economist Alfred Rappaport; the shareholder value theory was widely adopted in 20th century North American boardrooms. The BRT statement, signed by nearly 200 chief executive officers from major U.S. corporations in 2019, makes a "fundamental commitment to all of our stakeholders", including customers, employees, suppliers and local communities.

== Activities ==
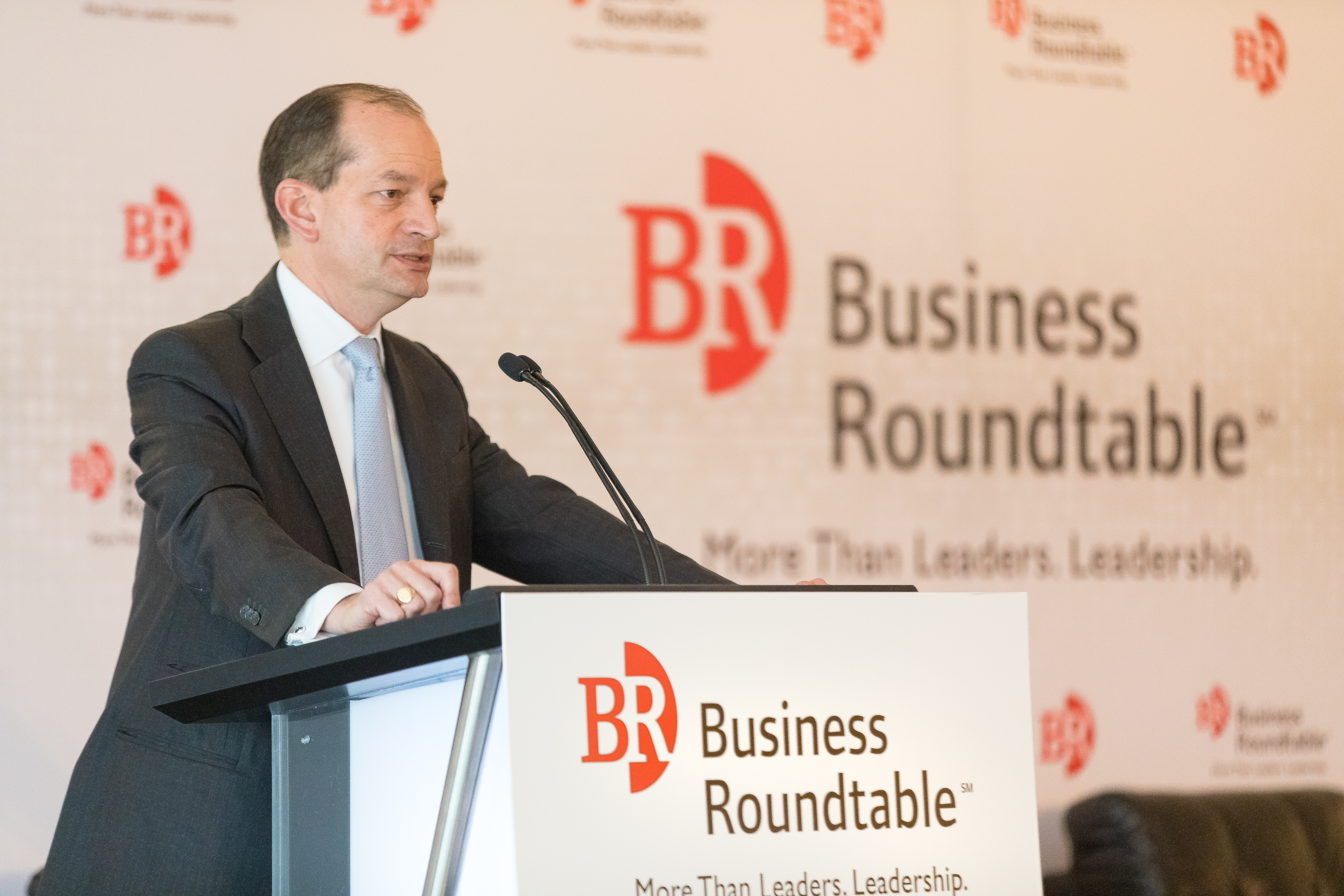
27th U.S. Secretary of Labor Alexander Acosta addressing the Business Roundtable in June 2017

The Business Roundtable played a key role in defeating an anti-trust bill in 1975 and a Ralph Nader plan for a consumer protection agency in 1977. It also helped dilute the Humphrey-Hawkins Full Employment Act. But the Roundtable's most significant victory was in blocking labor law reform that sought to strengthen labor law to make it more difficult for companies to intimidate workers who wanted to form unions. The AFL-CIO produced a bill in 1977 that passed the House. But the Roundtable voted to oppose the bill, and through its aggressive lobbying, it prevented the bill's Senate supporters from rounding up the 60 votes in the Senate necessary to withstand a filibuster.

In fiscal policy, the Roundtable was responsible for broadening the 1985 tax cuts signed into law by Ronald Reagan, lobbying successfully for sharp reductions in corporate taxes. In trade policy, it argued for opening foreign markets to American trade and investment. In 1990, the Roundtable urged George Bush to initiate a free trade agreement with Mexico. In 1993, the Roundtable lobbied for NAFTA and against any strong side agreements on labor and the environment. The Roundtable also supported the new NAFTA deal in 2019.

The Roundtable also successfully opposed changes in corporate governance that would have made boards of directors and CEOs more accountable to stockholders. In 1986, the Roundtable convinced the Securities and Exchange Commission to forgo new rules on merger and acquisitions, and in 1993 convinced President Clinton to water down his plan to impose penalties on excessive executive salaries. Citicorp CEO, John Reed, chairperson of the Roundtables Accounting Task Force, argued that Clinton's plan would have had negative effects on U.S. competitiveness. The Roundtable's Health, Welfare, and Retirement Income Task Force, chaired by Prudential Insurance CEO Robert C. Winters, cheered President Bush's plan, which consisted mainly of subsidies to the health care industry. The nation's health care system works well for the majority of Americans, the Roundtable announced in a June 1991 statement. "We believe the solutions lie not in tearing down the present system, but in building upon it."

It has issued press releases, submitted editorials, given congressional testimony, and distributed position advertisements. After the No Child Left Behind Act of 2001 was signed into law in January 2002, the Roundtable issued a press release stating that it had "strongly supported passage of the legislation" and was "actively working with states on implementation."

The Business Roundtable also acts as a major lobby that aims to extend or maintain administrators' rights/power in large companies. For example, the U.S. Securities and Exchange Commission adopted the so-called "shareholders’ access to proxy" rule, which aimed to empower shareholders in the proposition and nomination of administrators of big corporations. The Business Roundtable was strongly against that rule, as its president John Castellani reported to The Washington Post about removing this rule: "this is our highest priority [...] Literally all of our members have called about this". And they got the upper hand: the SEC rule was finally dropped after intense lobbying and lawsuits.

In June 2018, Business Roundtable issued a statement urging the White House "Administration to end immediately the policy of separating accompanied minors from their parents," and condemned the practice as "cruel and contrary to American values." Authored by the organization's Immigration Committee chairman, Chuck Robbins, the statement also commended bipartisan lawmakers for working together to reform immigration policies, and was widely supported by the Business Roundtable chair and membership.

In April 2024, the Business Roundtable filed suit against the Federal Trade Commission (FTC) after the FTC issued a ban on noncompete agreements which the FTC cited as "widespread and often exploitative practice imposing contractual conditions that prevent workers from taking a new job or starting a new business."

== Legislation ==
The Business Roundtable wrote a letter to members of the House strongly endorsing the Customer Protection and End User Relief Act (H.R. 4413; 113th Congress). According to the Business Roundtable letter, a survey of chief financial officers and corporate treasurers "underscores the urgent need for the end-user provisions" in this bill because "eighty-six percent of respondents indicated the fully collateralizing over-the-counter (OTC) derivatives would adversely impact business investment, acquisitions, research and development, and job creation." The letter concluded that the Business Roundtable "supports efforts to increase transparency in the derivatives markets and enhance financial stability for the U.S. economy through thoughtful new regulation while avoiding needless costs."

Together with the U.S. Chamber of Commerce and the National Association of Manufacturers, in 2021, the BRT lobbied House and Senate Democrats "against raising taxes on corporations, high-income earners and small businesses" to finance the Build Back Better initiative proposed by President Joe Biden.

In April 2025, BRT issued a white paper defining the corporate proxy process as co-opted by shareholder activists to advance political agendas, and urging Congress and the SEC to ban all shareholder proposals related to "environmental, social and political issues" in corporate proxy statements, by legislation.

== 2019 corporation pledge ==
On August 19, 2019, the Business Roundtable released a new "Statement on the Purpose of a Corporation." Signed by nearly 200 chief executive officers, including Amazon's Jeff Bezos, Apple's Tim Cook, General Motors' Mary Barra and Oracle's Safra Catz, the group seeks to "move away from shareholder primacy", a concept that had existed in the group's principles since 1997, and move to "include commitment to all stakeholders." It notes that "businesses play a vital role in the economy" because of jobs, fostering innovation and providing essential services. But it places shareholder interests on the same level as those of customers, employees, suppliers and communities. "Each of our stakeholders is essential", the statement says. "We commit to deliver value to all of them, for the future success of our companies, our communities and our country."

=== Criticism ===
In September 2019, Bezos was cited as the "first CEO to break his pledge" by the Los Angeles Times. He no longer appeared on the BRT membership roster in 2021. In July 2021, prior to stepping down as CEO, Bezos nonetheless added "Strive to be Earth's Best Employer" to Amazon's set of leadership principles.

Former U.S. secretary of labor and professor of public policy at Berkeley University, Robert Reich, accused both corporate social responsibility, and the Business Roundtable's commitment to it, of being a "con". Citing BRT members Jeff Bezos, Mary Barra and Dennis Muilenburg, Reich criticized their respective companies' recent decisions: Whole Foods, an Amazon subsidiary, announced the intention to cut medical benefits for its entire part-time workforce; Mary Barra, despite GM's hefty profits and large tax breaks, rejected worker's demands that GM raise their wages and stop outsourcing their jobs; and Muilenburg, who, as Reich predicted, would depart Boeing with $62 million in compensation and pension benefits, despite the Boeing 737 MAX groundings.

U.S. senator Elizabeth Warren, in September 2020, addressed the BRT in correspondence. The "withering, 11-page letter to past and present leaders of the Business Roundtable (BRT)" states that the BRT violates its August 2019 pledge to prioritize stakeholder value, calling the mandate an "empty gesture".

In August 2021, Harvard Law School's Program on Corporate Governance found that the 2019 "Statement on the Purpose of a Corporation" represented no meaningful commitment by the BRT membership, citing the pledge made as "mostly for show". In response, the director and CEO of JUST Capital, a non-profit that ranks companies based on ESG factors, admitted that ESG and stakeholder capitalism are imperfect, but argued that it is nonetheless the best approach for "long-term, widespread prosperity and a stable democratic way of life."

== BRT board of directors ==
As of 2024, corporate CEO members of BRT's board of directors are:

- BRT Chair Chuck Robbins, Cisco
- BRT CEO and president Joshua Bolten, former White House chief of staff
- Mary T. Barra, General Motors
- Brendan Bechtel, Bechtel
- Thasunda Brown Duckett, TIAA
- Tim Cook, Apple
- Jamie Dimon, JPMorgan Chase
- Beth Ford, Land O'Lakes
- Jane Fraser, Citigroup
- Adena Friedman, Nasdaq
- Lynn J. Good, Duke Energy
- Tricia Griffith, Progressive Corporation
- Scott Kirby, United Airlines
- Ramon Laguarta, PepsiCo
- Ryan M. Lance, ConocoPhillips
- Hal Lawton, Tractor Supply Company
- Judy Marks, Otis Worldwide
- Doug McMillon, Walmart
- Jon R. Moeller, Procter & Gamble
- Blake Moret, Rockwell Automation
- Christopher J. Nassetta, Hilton
- George Oliver, Johnson Controls
- David A Ricks, Eli Lilly & Company
- Jennifer Rumsey, Cummins
- Robert F. Smith, Vista Equity Partners
- Stephen Squeri, American Express
- Raj Subramaniam, FedEx

=== President ===
- John Engler, 2010–2017
- Joshua Bolten, 2017–
