= John N. Camp =

American politician (1908–1987)

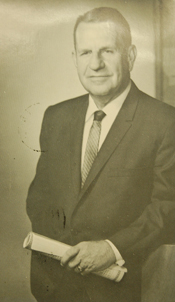

Member of the U.S. House of Representatives from Oklahoma's 6th district
- In office January 3, 1969 – January 3, 1975
- Preceded by: James Vernon Smith
- Succeeded by: Glenn English

Member of the Oklahoma House of Representatives
- In office 1943–1963

Personal details
- Born: John Newbold Camp; May 11, 1908 Enid, Oklahoma, U.S.
- Died: September 27, 1987 (aged 79) Enid, Oklahoma, U.S.
- Citizenship: United States
- Party: Republican
- Spouse: Vera Overman Camp
- Children: 4
- Education: Phillips University
- Profession: banker politician

John Newbold Camp, known as Happy Camp (May 11, 1908 – September 27, 1987) was an American businessman, banker, and politician who served three terms as a Republican U.S. Representative from Oklahoma from 1969 to 1975.

== Biography ==
Born in Enid, Camp was the son of Minnie C. Newbold and John R. Camp. Because of his pleasant personality as an infant, his father nicknamed him "Happy", and as an adult, the younger Camp legally changed his name so that the jovial word would appear on ballots as he ran for public office. He attended elementary and high schools in Blackwell, Douglas, and Waukomis. He attended Phillips University in Enid.

=== Family ===
In November 1930 he married Vera Overman, and they had four children: Patricia, Kay, John III, and Steven Richard.

== Career ==
Camp became president of Waukomis State Bank. He served as member of the State of Oklahoma House of Representatives from 1943 to 1963. He served as chairman of the Oklahoma State Board of Public Affairs from 1967 to 1968. He was GOP precinct chairman of the Garfield County Young Republican chairman and Oklahoma committee member.

=== Congress ===
Elected as a Representative to the Ninety-First and to the two succeeding Congresses, Camp served from January 3, 1969 to January 3, 1975. He was defeated for reelection in 1974, when the Watergate affair contributed to the defeat of dozens of Republican candidates across the country, even though those individuals were not involved in Watergate.

== Death ==
Camp died from a heart attack in Enid, Garfield County, Oklahoma, on September 27, 1987 (age 79 years, 139 days). He is interred at Waukomis Cemetery, Waukomis, Oklahoma.

U.S. House of Representatives
Preceded by James V. Smith	Member of the U.S. House of Representatives from Oklahoma's 6th congressional district 1969–1975	Succeeded by Glenn English
