= Lynn Good =

American business executive

Lynn J. Good
- Born: 1959 or 1960 (age 66–67)
- Education: Miami University
- Occupations: Chair, president and CEO of Duke Energy
- Years active: CEO of Duke Energy July 1, 2013 - April 2025
- Board member of: Duke Energy; Boeing
- Spouse: Brian

Lynn J. Good (born 1959 or 1960) is an American business executive who was the president and chief executive officer of Duke Energy between 2013 and 2025. Good is an Ohio native and graduated from Miami University where she earned a BS in Systems Analysis and Accounting (1981). In 2023, she ranked 65th in Forbes list of "World's 100 most powerful women". She was ranked 31st on Fortune's list of Most Powerful Women in 2023.

== Early life and education ==
Good grew up in Fairfield, Ohio. Her father was a math teacher who later became a high school principal. She earned degrees in accounting and systems analysis from Miami University.

== Career ==
=== Early career ===
Good served as an auditor at the Cincinnati branch of Arthur Andersen & Co. In 1992, she became one of Andersen's few female partners. In 2002 she became a partner at Deloitte.

=== Cinergy ===
Following the dissolution of Arthur Andersen in 2002, Good joined Cinergy Corp. as senior vice president of accounting and finance. In 2005, Good was named executive vice president and chief financial officer of Cinergy. In 2006, following the merger of Cinergy into Duke Energy, Good was named senior vice president and treasurer of Duke in the company's Charlotte, North Carolina, headquarters. She went on to head the unregulated commercial business. Good was named Duke's executive vice president and chief financial officer as of July 2009. She began to make large investments in renewable energy such as wind and solar facilities that sell their power to utilities and towns.

=== Duke Energy ===
Lynn Good became CEO of Duke Energy on July 1, 2013. Good was also elected to the Duke board. In 2016, she was elected chairman of the board. In 2018, Duke Energy awarded Good just under $14 million in total compensation. Good retired from her role as CEO in April 2025.

==== Energy policy positions ====
The Center for Strategic & International Studies (CSIS) held an interview with Good on June 21, 2018; among the topics were carbon capture and sequestration. Carbon capture and storage technology can capture up to 90 percent of carbon dioxide (CO_{2}) emissions made from a fossil fuels electricity generation plant, thus releasing much less carbon dioxide into the atmosphere. Good told CSIS that the carbon capture and sequestration process was not quite ready for general use, even though it has the potential to keep fossil fuels in the power-generation mix. According to Daily Energy Insider, "On paper, a gas or coal plant that does not release carbon dioxide into the air would be a logical asset to fill in any lags in purely green power production”, but Good indicated that while Duke was still collaborating on various research projects involving carbon capture, the big breakthroughs necessary to launch a commercially viable carbon-capture plant were not yet in sight."

== Board memberships ==
Good was a member of the board of the Cincinnati Ballet for about eight years, from the 1990s, and has been a member of the board of directors at Boeing since 2015. She is on the board of directors of the Business Roundtable and has served as chair of its Smart Regulation Committee since 2020.
