= United States Youth Council =

American coalition of nonprofits

The United States Youth Council (USYC) was a nonprofit coalition of organizations which served youth and young adults in the United States. It was founded in 1945 by the National Social Welfare Assembly as that organization's youth division, but became independent in the early 1960s. In 1967, The New York Times revealed that the USYC had received more than 90 percent of its funds from the Central Intelligence Agency, leading many of the organization's largest members to quit. USYC continued to receive funding from the United States government before disbanding in 1986.

== Founding ==
The USYC was founded in 1945 by the National Social Welfare Assembly, a coalition of social service agencies. Originally named the "Young Adult Council of the NSWA" (YAC), the organization had 16 members, including American Youth Hostels, Camp Fire Girls, 4-H, American Unitarian Youth, National Catholic Welfare Conference, National Students Assembly, YMCA and YWCA.

YAC's structure was staff-driven. It was led by an executive director who was a full-time staff members of NSWA, and most of its funding came from the NSWA as well. International travel was often funded by outside sources, such as the Rockefeller Foundation. YAC nevertheless maintained a chairman who, under the organization's bylaws, was required to be under the age of 30. The organization also maintained council of representatives from each participating member. As late as 1967, 60 percent of WAY's budget was financed by contributions from the foundation.

== History ==
In 1948, the World Assembly of Youth (WAY) was formed as a non-communist alternative to the World Federation of Democratic Youth. WAY's inaugural convention was in August 1948. Prior to the meeting, the Young Adult Council ejected most of its members with ties to political parties or trade unions. The YAC played a significant role in drafting the WAY constitution and electing its first leaders, and became the U.S. affiliate of WAY.

WAY struggled financially in its early years. YAC provided most of WAY's funding through a grant from the Foundation for Youth and Student Affairs, a front organization established and funded by the U.S. Central Intelligence Agency (CIA). YAC provided $301,000 to WAY from the foundation. Although WAY was troubled by its dependence on the Americans (and one American donor), the organization had no choice but to accept the money. YAC's executive director, Bernice Bridges, knew that the source of the funds was the U.S. government. But this fact did not appear to concern her or her superiors in NSWA.

In 1963, YAC changed its name to the United States Youth Council.

USYC, too, continued its reliance on CIA money. At the height of its strength in the middle to late 1960s, the U.S. Youth Council had 37 member organizations, including the College Democrats of America, Collegiate Council for the United Nations, National Federation of Catholic Youth, National Student Association, Students for a Democratic Society, YMCA, Young Christian Workers, Young Democrats of America, Young Republicans, and the Youth Division of the NAACP. At various times, it worked closely with the International Ladies' Garment Workers' Union, the Leadership Conference on Civil Rights and the A. Philip Randolph Institute.

In 1967, The New York Times revealed that the CIA had supplied 90 percent of the organization's funds, and was surreptitiously controlling its agenda. Presidents and vice-presidents of USYC were aware of the source of the funds: They were given a top-secret security clearance by the CIA and required to sign a 20-year confidentiality agreement to keep the intelligence agency's involvement a secret. The revelations caused a number of the U.S. Youth Council's largest members to withdraw.

USYC's council conducted an investigation which was largely inconclusive. The study found that some officers had clearly signed secrecy agreements, but the council was unable to prove that all presidents and vice-presidents had done so. The National Student Association and the University Christian Movement claimed the study was a whitewash, and withdrew from the USYC. In response, the USYC resolved not to accept any more funding from the Foundation for Youth and Student Affairs.

The loss of government financing nearly bankrupted the USYC. In December 1967, the United States Department of State stepped in to provide funding to keep the organization afloat. In time, financing was shifted to the United States Information Agency (USIA), which continued to fund its work openly.

The ongoing revelations of CIA funding led USYC and NSWA to sever their relationship in 1969.

USYC withdrew from WAY in 1976 after several years of tension over policies, programs, funding and anti-American feeling by delegates from under-developed countries. USYC became increasingly conservative and isolated within the American and international youth movement for the remainder of the 1970s and through the 1980s. In some respects, this enabled the organization to continue to receive funding from the Reagan administration.

In 1981, the United Nations announced that 1985 would be an International Youth Year (IYY). USYC attempted to take the lead in planning for U.S. participation in the IYY. Competition with a rival body, the U.S. Committee on International Youth Year, led to a congressional investigation. In 1985, Congress passed the Zorinsky amendment (U.S.C. 1461-1a), which barred programs funded by the USIA from operating domestically or conducting propaganda campaigns against domestic audiences. The law also required the IYY committees to be representative and open to all youth organizations. USYC refused to open the executive positions on its IYY committee to other groups, and American participation in the IYY collapsed.

USIA withdrew its funding for the USYC in 1986, and the organization folded.

== Notable leaders ==
- Jed Johnson, Jr. - president, 1962–1964
- Ronald E. Robinson - president, 1983-1985
- David Ridenour - executive director, 1984-1985.
- Hunter R. Schone - Youth President 2009–Present
