= Glenn English =

American politician

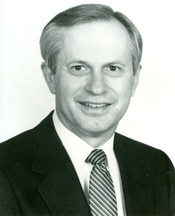

Member of the U.S. House of Representatives from Oklahoma's 6th district
- In office January 3, 1975 – January 7, 1994
- Preceded by: John Newbold Camp
- Succeeded by: Frank Lucas

Personal details
- Born: Glenn Lee English Jr. November 30, 1940 (age 85) Cordell, Oklahoma, U.S.
- Party: Democratic
- Spouse: Jan Barnett
- Children: 2
- Education: Southwestern Oklahoma State University (BA)

Military service
- Allegiance: United States
- Branch/service: United States Army
- Years of service: 1965–1971
- Rank: Staff Sergeant
- Unit: United States Army Reserve

Glenn Lee English Jr. (born November 30, 1940) is an American businessman, lobbyist, and Democratic politician who represented Oklahoma's 6th congressional district for 10 consecutive terms from 1975 to 1994.

English later became the chief executive officer (CEO) of the National Rural Electric Cooperative Association.

== Early life and career ==
=== Military service and business activities ===
English was born in Cordell, Oklahoma. He earned his Bachelor of Arts degree from Southwestern Oklahoma State University in 1964. English joined the United States Army Reserves and rose to the rank of staff sergeant. After completing military service in 1971, he worked in the oil and natural gas leasing business, was a realtor, sold insurance, and worked in mortgage lending. He met and married Jan Pangle Barnett and together they had two children John Lee and Tyler Janine. They lived in McLean, Virginia while Glenn was in office.

=== Service in Congress ===
English's first job in politics was as a staff member for the majority caucus of the California State Assembly. Later, he worked as a legislative staffer in the U.S. House of Representatives. After serving as the executive director of the Oklahoma Democratic Party (from 1969 to 1973), English was elected as a Democrat to Congress representing Oklahoma's 6th Congressional District (in November 1974). English was re-elected to Congress nine times. He was one of the most conservative Democrats in the chamber, which was not surprising given the nature of his district. It spanned from the Oklahoma Panhandle to northeastern Oklahoma City, including along the way some of the most rural and conservative territory in Oklahoma.

While in Congress, English served on the Committee on Agriculture and the Committee on Government Operations. He also was the Chairman of the Select Committee on Narcotics Abuse and Control.

In addition, English chaired the Government Information, Justice and Agriculture Subcommittee where he won approval for the military to use aircraft and radar to assist Custom agents in the interdiction of drug smugglers. During the 1985–86 term, English was instrumental in securing a $20 million federal hub in Oklahoma City to assist in the war on drugs which is currently located at the Will Rogers Airport.

In 1993, Glenn was also effective in halting a plan to reduce the work of the Rural Electrification Administration (REA). In a series of meetings between the Committee on Agriculture and the White House, Glenn successfully interceded between the two organizations to enhance REA's status and the quality of life for rural America.

English resigned from the House on January 7, 1994, and was succeeded in Congress by Frank Lucas, a Republican.

=== National Rural Electric Cooperative ===
Upon his departure from Congress in 1994, English became CEO of the National Rural Electric Cooperative Association (NRECA), based in Arlington, Va. NRECA is the national trade association for the Nation's 900-plus locally owned, consumer-controlled, non-profit electric cooperatives which deliver electricity to 42 million Americans in 47 states. In May 2010, after 16 years as CEO of NRECA, English was inducted into the Cooperative Hall of Fame at the National Press Club in Washington, DC.

U.S. House of Representatives
Preceded by John Newbold Camp	Member of the U.S. House of Representatives from Oklahoma's 6th congressional district 1975–1994	Succeeded by Frank Lucas
U.S. order of precedence (ceremonial)
Preceded by Rob Bishop as Former U.S. Representative	Order of precedence of the United States as Former U.S. Representative	Succeeded by Steve Rothman as Former U.S. Representative
