= Joseph H. Ball =

American politician (1905–1993)

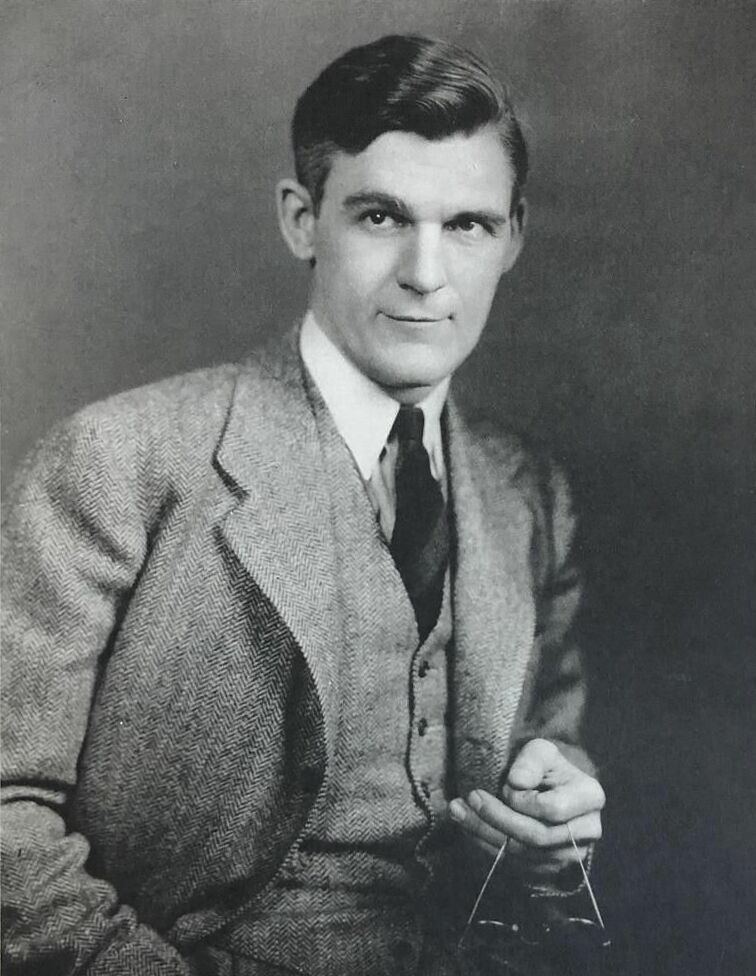
- Official portrait, c. 1941

United States Senator from Minnesota
- In office January 3, 1943 – January 3, 1949
- Preceded by: Arthur E. Nelson
- Succeeded by: Hubert Humphrey
- In office October 14, 1940 – November 17, 1942
- Appointed by: Harold Stassen
- Preceded by: Ernest Lundeen
- Succeeded by: Arthur E. Nelson

Personal details
- Born: Joseph Hurst Ball; November 3, 1905 Crookston, Minnesota, U.S.
- Died: December 18, 1993 (aged 88) Chevy Chase, Maryland, U.S.
- Resting place: Prospect Hill Cemetery, Front Royal, Virginia
- Party: Republican
- Spouse: Elisabeth Josephine Robbins
- Relations: Sara Elisabeth Lister (daughter)
- Education: Antioch College; Eau Claire Normal School; University of Minnesota

Joseph Hurst Ball (November 3, 1905 – December 18, 1993) was an American journalist, politician and businessman. Ball served as a Republican senator from Minnesota from 1940 to 1949. He was a conservative in domestic policy and a leading foe of labor unions who helped draft the Taft-Hartley Act of 1947. Ball was best known for his internationalism and his support for a postwar world organization, that became the United Nations. However, after 1945, he was an opponent of the Marshall Plan.

== Pre-Senate career ==
Ball was born in Crookston, Minnesota, on November 3, 1905, and graduated from high school in 1922. He financed his education at Antioch College by planting corn on borrowed land and held jobs during his two years there as a telephone linesman, a construction worker, and a factory employee. In 1925, he transferred to Eau Claire Normal, and then to the University of Minnesota, but never earned a degree. In 1927, he got a reporting job at the Minneapolis Journal. When he sold a story to a pulp magazine for $50, he quit to become a freelance writer, and spent a year writing paperback fiction before returning to journalism, this time for the St. Paul Pioneer Press. In 1934, he became the paper's state political reporter, and befriended assistant county attorney Harold Stassen, a fellow Republican. As a columnist in the Pioneer Press, Ball was critical of President Franklin D. Roosevelt and the Democratic-majority in Congress, but he also opposed isolationism in foreign policy. In the meantime, Stassen was elected governor of Minnesota.

Ball married Elisabeth Josephine Robbins on April 28, 1928. They had two daughters and a son.

== United States Senator ==
When Senator Ernest Lundeen, an isolationist, was killed in a plane crash, Minnesota Governor Harold Stassen appointed Ball to fill the remaining two years of Lundeen's term. One of the youngest persons ever to become a U.S. senator, Ball, at thirty-five, was also the first senator to be required to register for conscription. After being sworn in on October 14, 1940, Ball stunned isolationist Republicans in his first speech on the Senate floor, calling for the United States to aid Britain as "a barrier between us and whatever designs Hitler and his allies may have on this continent".

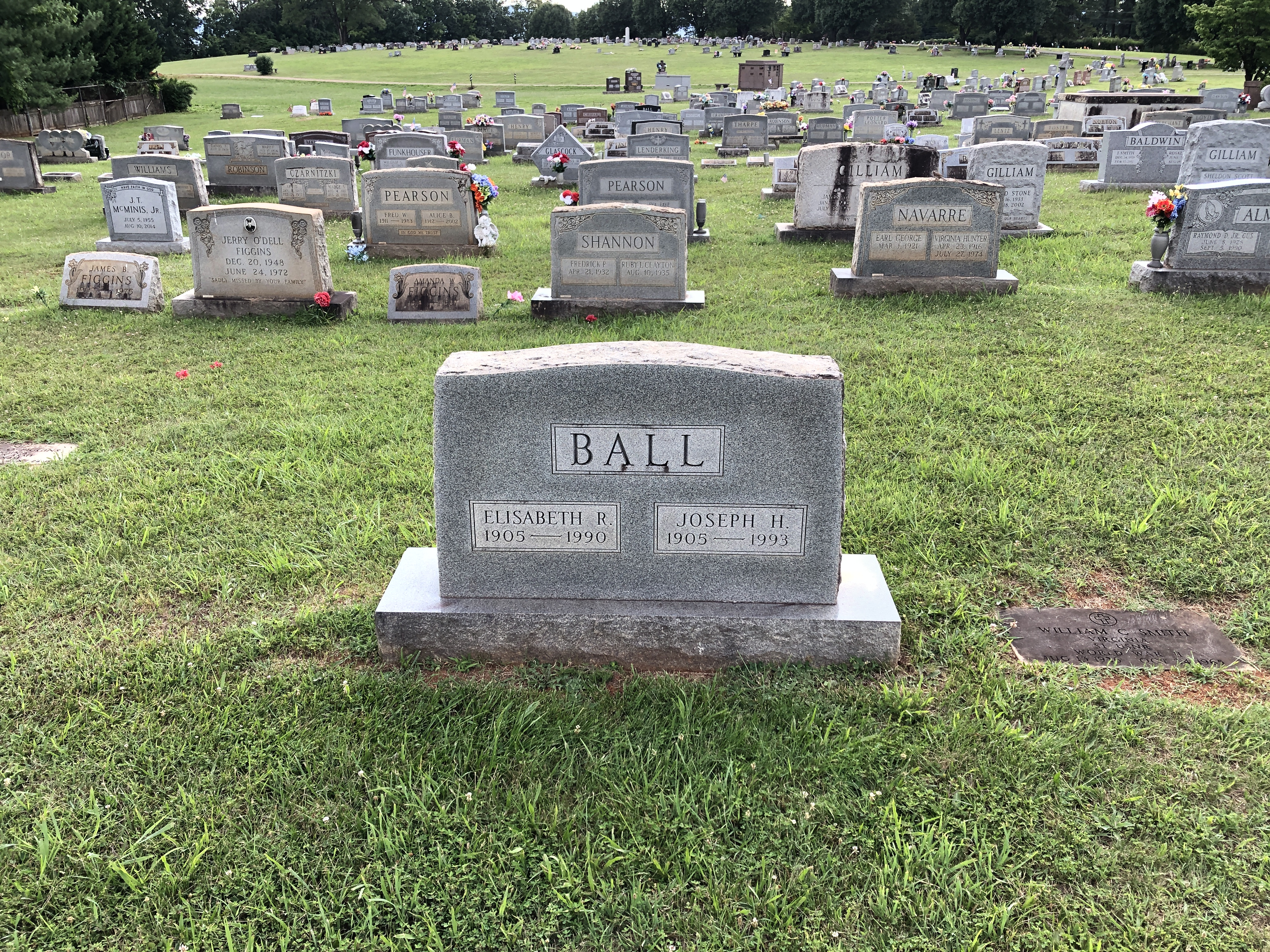
Ball's grave in Prospect Hill Cemetery, Front Royal, Virginia.

He opposed the economic liberalism of the New Deal, but he supported Franklin Roosevelt's foreign policy and supported the Lend-Lease program on March 8, 1941, in spite of overwhelmingly negative letters from his constituents. The change in sentiment was best illustrated by the editorial pages of the Fairmont Daily Sentinel, as quoted in an article in The New Republic. When he had first been appointed, the Sentinel ran an editorial with the headline, "Joe Ball for U.S. Senator! Good God!"; upon Ball's re-election, the Sentinel ran another editorial entitled "Joe Ball for U.S. Senator! Thank God!"

Ball was elected to the Senate in the 1942 election, receiving 47% of the vote against Farmer-Labor, Independent and Democratic opposition. Because Ball's 1940 appointment had been set to expire on the day of the next senatorial election rather than the expiration of Lundeen's term, Ball ceased being senator on the day that he won a six-year term. Ball then took office again, as a freshman senator on January 3, 1943, and served until January 3, 1949. In 1943, he was one of four Senate sponsors of the bill to establish what would become the United Nations.

In the 1944 U.S. presidential election, Ball refused to support Republican nominee Thomas E. Dewey, the governor of New York, and instead crossed party lines to endorse Franklin Roosevelt. Ball denounced Dewey for making his position on foreign policy so unclear that both isolationists and internationalists "could find comfort and support in what he said". Ball's support for Roosevelt, which may have proved critical to victory in Minnesota, won praise from his senatorial colleague Carl Hatch, a New Mexico Democrat, who said that Ball had "placed his country above his party".

In 1948, Ball was soundly defeated for Senate reelection by Minneapolis Mayor Hubert H. Humphrey, a 37-year-old liberal Democrat and civil rights advocate.

== Post-Senate career ==
During the 1950s, Ball came to the public defense of several people whom Senator Joseph R. McCarthy accused of having Communist leanings.

Ball had never stopped writing his column for the Pioneer Press, even during his service in the United States Senate. He therefore returned to the news business and continued to comment on American foreign policy in a newsletter. He worked as an executive in the shipping industry until he retired in 1962. Ball then moved to a farm in Front Royal, Virginia where he raised Black Angus cattle. His wife Elisabeth died in May 1990 and their son Peter died in August 1990. Three years later, Ball died at the Bethesda Rehabilitation and Nursing Center in Chevy Chase, Maryland, at the age of 88 after suffering a stroke. He was buried at Prospect Hill Cemetery in Front Royal.

Party political offices
Preceded by Arthur E. Nelson	Republican nominee for U.S. Senator from Minnesota (Class 2); 1942, 1948	Succeeded by Val Bjornson
U.S. Senate
Preceded by Ernest Lundeen	U.S. senator (Class 2) from Minnesota; October 14, 1940 – November 17, 1942; Served alongside: Henrik Shipstead	Succeeded by Arthur E. Nelson
Preceded by Arthur E. Nelson	U.S. senator (Class 2) from Minnesota; January 3, 1943 – January 3, 1949; Served alongside: Henrik Shipstead, Edward John Thye	Succeeded by Hubert Humphrey
Honorary titles
Preceded by Happy Chandler; Kentucky	Most senior living U.S. senator (Sitting or former); June 15, 1991 – December 18, 1993	Succeeded by Berkeley Bunker; Nevada
Preceded by Rush Dew Holt, Sr. West Virginia	Youngest member of the United States Senate; October 17, 1940 – December 12, 1940	Succeeded by Berkeley Bunker; Nevada
Preceded by Henry Cabot Lodge Jr. Massachusetts	Youngest member of the United States Senate; January 3, 1943 – November 14, 1944	Succeeded by William E. Jenner; Indiana
Preceded by William E. Jenner; Indiana	Youngest member of the United States Senate; January 3, 1945 – January 18, 1945	Succeeded by Hugh Mitchell; Washington
