= James Vernon Smith =

American politician

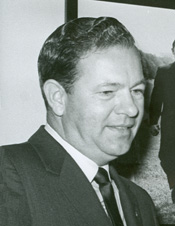

Administrator of the Farmers Home Administration
- In office 1969–1973

Member of the U.S. House of Representatives from Oklahoma's 6th district
- In office January 3, 1967 – January 3, 1969
- Preceded by: Jed Johnson, Jr.
- Succeeded by: John Newbold Camp

Personal details
- Born: July 23, 1926 Oklahoma City, Oklahoma
- Died: June 23, 1973 (aged 46) Grady County, Oklahoma
- Citizenship: United States
- Party: Republican
- Spouse: Mary Belle Couch Smith
- Children: 3
- Education: Oklahoma College of Liberal Arts
- Profession: Congressman

James Vernon Smith (July 23, 1926 – June 23, 1973) was an American politician and a U.S. Representative from Oklahoma.

== Biography ==
Born in Oklahoma City, Oklahoma, Smith was the son of Fred O. and Josephine Meder Smith, and was educated in Tuttle public schools and attended Oklahoma College of Liberal Arts at Chickasha, Oklahoma. He married Mary Belle Couch, and the couple had three children, Jay, Sarah, and Lee Ann.

== Career ==
Smith engaged in farming and cattle raising, and served as member of the board of regents of Oklahoma Four-Year Colleges.

Elected as a Republican to the 90th Congress, Smith served from January 3, 1967 to January 3, 1969. Smith voted against the Civil Rights Act of 1968. He was an unsuccessful candidate for reelection in 1968. After a 1967 redistricting plan forced him into running against either fellow Republican Happy Camp or Democrat Tom Steed, he chose to take on Steed, a conservative Democrat from Shawnee who had nearly been defeated in 1966. Smith was defeated by a 54% to 46% tally despite the fact that Nixon won a plurality in the newly drawn district.

Nominated by President Nixon to be Administrator of Farmers Home Administration and confirmed by the Senate on March 16, 1969, Smith served until his resignation in 1973.

== Death ==
Smith died in a wheat field fire at his farm, near Chickasha, Grady County, Oklahoma, on June 23, 1973 (age 46 years, 335 days). He is interred at Fairlawn Cemetery, Chickasha, Oklahoma.

U.S. House of Representatives
Preceded by Jed Johnson, Jr.	Member of the U.S. House of Representatives from Oklahoma's 6th congressional district 1967–1969	Succeeded by John N. Camp
