= Customer Protection and End User Relief Act =

Proposed bill in U.S. Congress

- Long title: To reauthorize the Commodity Futures Trading Commission, to better protect futures customers, to provide end users with market certainty, to make basic reforms to ensure transparency and accountability at the Commission, to help farmers, ranchers, and end users manage risks to help keep consumer costs low, and for other purposes.
- Announced in: the 113th United States Congress
- Sponsored by: Rep. Frank D. Lucas (R, OK-3)
- Number of co-sponsors: 3

Codification
- U.S.C. sections affected: 7 U.S.C. § 2, 7 U.S.C. § 1a, 7 U.S.C. § 6s, 7 U.S.C. § 21, 7 U.S.C. § 24a, and others.
- Agencies affected: U.S. Securities and Exchange Commission, African Development Fund, Government Accountability Office, Inter-American Development Bank, U.S. Court of Appeals for the Federal Circuit, International Monetary Fund, United Nations, International Bank for Reconstruction and Development, Asian Development Bank, Commodity Futures Trading Commission
- Authorizations of appropriations: an unlimited amount for each of fiscal years 2014, 2015, 2016, 2017 and 2018

Legislative history
- Introduced in the House as H.R. 4413 by Rep. Frank D. Lucas (R, OK-3) on April 7, 2014; Committee consideration by United States House Committee on Agriculture

The Customer Protection and End User Relief Act (H.R. 4413) was a bill that would have reauthorized the Commodity Futures Trading Commission through 2018 and amended some provisions of the Dodd–Frank Wall Street Reform and Consumer Protection Act.

The bill was introduced into the United States House of Representatives during the 113th United States Congress.

== Provisions of the bill ==
One provision of the bill was the inclusion of the provisions of H.R. 742, the Swap Data Repository and Clearinghouse Indemnification Correction Act of 2013. This previous bill dealt with "issues surrounding the indemnification provisions and confidentiality requirements of Dodd-Frank."

Another provision of the bill was the inclusion of the Business Risk Mitigation and Price Stabilization Act of 2013 (H.R. 634), a bill that would exempt nonfinancial entities that enter into a swap or a security-based swap transaction from meeting certain margin requirements when the transaction is designed to offset losses or gains in other investments.

The bill also includes some of the provisions from H.R. 677, the Inter-Affiliate Swap Clarification Act.

== Congressional Budget Office report ==
This summary is based largely on the summary provided by the Congressional Budget Office, as ordered reported by the House Committee on Agriculture on April 9, 2014. This is a public domain source.

H.R. 4413 would authorize appropriations for the Commodity Futures Trading Commission (CFTC) through 2018 and make changes in some of the agency’s operating procedures. The bill also would amend the Commodity Exchange Act to provide greater protections for customer funds held by entities that broker transactions in commodity futures and to relax requirements on certain participants in swap transactions in a number of different circumstances. (A swap is a contract that calls for an exchange of cash between two participants, based on an underlying rate or index or on the performance of an asset.)

The Congressional Budget Office (CBO) estimates that implementing H.R. 4413 would cost $207 million in 2015 and $948 million over the 2015-2019 period, assuming appropriation of the necessary amounts. The CBO expects that enacting H.R. 4413 would affect direct spending and revenues; therefore, pay-as-you-go procedures apply. However, the CBO estimates that those effects would not be significant.

H.R. 4413 contains no intergovernmental or private-sector mandates as defined in the Unfunded Mandates Reform Act.

== Procedural history ==
The Customer Protection and End User Relief Act was introduced into the United States House of Representatives on April 7, 2014 by Rep. Frank D. Lucas (R, OK-3). The bill was referred to the United States House Committee on Agriculture, which ordered it reported by a voice vote on April 9, 2014. It was reported alongside House Report 113-469 on June 5, 2014. The House was scheduled to debate and vote on the bill on June 20, 2014.

== Debate and discussion ==
The Depository Trust & Clearing Corporation supported the bill, arguing the provisions from H.R. 742, included in this bill, would "help ensure that regulators and the public continue to have access to a consolidated and accurate view of the global marketplace, including concentrations of risk and market exposure."

The Business Roundtable, an industry trade organization, wrote a letter to members of the House strongly endorsing the bill. According to the Business Roundtable letter, a survey of chief financial officers and corporate treasurers "underscores the urgent need for the end-user provisions" in this bill because "eighty-six percent of respondents indicated the fully collateralizing over-the-counter (OTC) derivatives would adversely impact business investment, acquisitions, research and development, and job creation." The letter concluded that the Business Roundtable "supports efforts to increase transparency in the derivatives markets and enhance financial stability for the U.S. economy through thoughtful new regulation while avoiding needless costs."

The group Americans for Financial Reform opposed the bill, arguing that "the legislation would place significant new barriers in the way of effective oversight of commodities and derivatives markets crucial to our economy, barriers not faced by any other regulatory agency." Americans for Financial Reform charged that the bill would give financial industry interests more power over regulators and the ability to delay or prevent the CFTC from acting. The organization also charged that insufficient time was allowed for the public to review the legislation before the House Agriculture Committee voted on it.

== See also ==
- List of bills in the 113th United States Congress
