= Oklahoma's 6th congressional district =

Former US congressional district

- Obsolete district
- Created: 1915
- Eliminated: 2000
- Years active: 1915-2003

Oklahoma's 6th congressional district is a former U.S. congressional district in Western Oklahoma. Oklahoma gained three seats in the 1910 census but elected the extra seats at-large in 1912. The 6th district was thus created and first used for the 1914 House election (as well as the 7th and 8th districts). Oklahoma has gradually lost seats since the 1910 census; it lost its sixth seat in the 2000 census.

In its final configuration, it stretched across the western third of the state, from the Oklahoma Panhandle through Enid, Cheyenne and Altus to downtown Oklahoma City. Since 2003, most of the territory that was in the final configuration of the 6th district has been in the 3rd district.

== List of representatives ==
Name	Party	Years	Cong ress	Electoral history
District established March 4, 1915
Scott Ferris (Lawton)	Democratic	March 4, 1915 – March 3, 1921	64th 65th 66th	Redistricted from the 5th district and re-elected in 1914. Re-elected in 1916. Re-elected in 1918. Retired to run for U.S. Senator.
L. M. Gensman (Lawton)	Republican	March 4, 1921 – March 3, 1923	67th	Elected in 1920. Lost re-election.
Elmer Thomas (Medicine Park)	Democratic	March 4, 1923 – March 3, 1927	68th 69th	First elected in 1922. Re-elected in 1924. Retired to run for U.S. Senator.
Jed Johnson (Anadarko)	Democratic	March 4, 1927 – January 3, 1947	70th 71st 72nd 73rd 74th 75th 76th 77th 78th 79th	First elected in 1926. Re-elected in 1928. Re-elected in 1930. Re-elected in 1932. Re-elected in 1934. Re-elected in 1936. Re-elected in 1938. Re-elected in 1940. Re-elected in 1942. Re-elected in 1944. Lost renomination
Toby Morris (Lawton)	Democratic	January 3, 1947 – January 3, 1953	80th 81st 82nd	First elected in 1946. Re-elected in 1948. Re-elected in 1950. Lost renomination in a redistricting contest.
Victor Wickersham (Lawton)	Democratic	January 3, 1953 – January 3, 1957	83rd 84th	Redistricted from the 7th district and re-elected in 1952. Re-elected in 1954. Lost renomination.
Toby Morris (Mangum)	Democratic	January 3, 1957 – January 3, 1961	85th 86th	Again elected in 1956. Re-elected in 1958. Lost renomination
Victor Wickersham (Mangum)	Democratic	January 3, 1961 – January 3, 1965	87th 88th	Again elected in 1960. Re-elected in 1962. Lost renomination.
Jed Johnson Jr. (Chickasha)	Democratic	January 3, 1965 – January 3, 1967	89th	Elected in 1964. Lost re-election.
James V. Smith (Chickasha)	Republican	January 3, 1967 – January 3, 1969	90th	Elected in 1966. Redistricted to the 4th district after redistricting, and lost re-election there.
John N. Camp (Waukomis)	Republican	January 3, 1969 – January 3, 1975	91st 92nd 93rd	First elected in 1968. Re-elected in 1970. Re-elected in 1972. Lost re-election.
Glenn English (Cordell)	Democratic	January 3, 1975 – January 7, 1994	94th 95th 96th 97th 98th 99th 100th 101st 102nd 103rd	First elected in 1974. Re-elected in 1976. Re-elected in 1978. Re-elected in 1980. Re-elected in 1982. Re-elected in 1984. Re-elected in 1986. Re-elected in 1988. Re-elected in 1990. Re-elected in 1992. Resigned to become CEO of the National Rural Electric Cooperative Association
Vacant		January 7, 1994 – May 10, 1994	103rd	
Frank Lucas (Cheyenne)	Republican	May 10, 1994 – January 3, 2003	103rd 104th 105th 106th 107th	First elected to finish English's term. Re-elected in 1994. Re-elected in 1996. Re-elected in 1998. Re-elected in 2000. Redistricted to the 3rd district
District dissolved January 3, 2003

== Electoral history ==
Oklahoma's 6th congressional district: Results 1992–2000
Year	Democrat	Votes	Pct	Republican	Votes	Pct	3rd Party	Party	Votes	Pct
1992	Glenn English	134,734	68%	Bob Anthony	64,068	32%				
1994	Jeffrey S. Tollett	45,399	30%	Frank D. Lucas	106,961	70%				
1996	Paul M. Barby	64,173	36%	Frank D. Lucas	113,499	64%				
1998	Paul M. Barby	43,555	33%	Frank D. Lucas	85,261	65%	Ralph B. Finkle, Jr.	Independent	2,455	2%
2000	Randy Beutler	63,106	39%	Frank D. Lucas	95,635	59%	Joseph V. Cristiano	Libertarian	2,435	2%
