= Jed Johnson Jr. =

American politician (1939–1993)

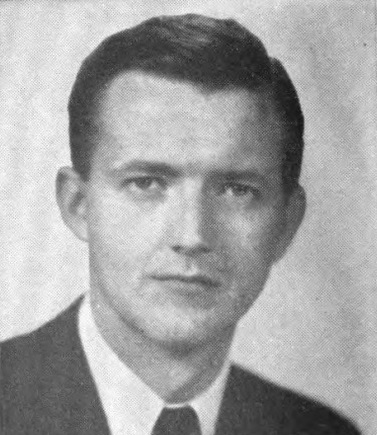

Member of the U.S. House of Representatives from Oklahoma's 6th district
- In office January 3, 1965 – January 3, 1967
- Preceded by: Victor Wickersham
- Succeeded by: James Smith

Personal details
- Born: Jed Joseph Johnson Jr. December 27, 1939 Washington, D.C., U.S.
- Died: December 16, 1993 (aged 53) Falls Church, Virginia, U.S.
- Party: Democratic
- Spouse: Sydney Herlong Johnson
- Relations: Jed Johnson Sr. (father)
- Children: 2
- Education: University of Oklahoma

Jed Joseph Johnson Jr. (December 27, 1939 – December 16, 1993) was an American politician who served as the U.S. representative for Oklahoma's 6th congressional district from 1965 to 1967. He was a member of the Democratic Party.

== Early life and education ==
Born in Washington, D.C., the son of Jed J. Johnson and Beatrice Johnson (née Luginbyhl), Johnson attended public schools in Chickasha, Oklahoma, and Friends Seminary in New York City. He served as a congressional page and graduated from the Capitol Page School in Washington, D.C., in 1957. He graduated from the University of Oklahoma in 1961.

== Career ==
Johnson served as a delegate to the International Student Movement for the United Nations Conference at Lund, Sweden, in 1961, and as president of the United States Youth Council from 1962 to 1964. He led a delegation from the organization to West Africa in 1963, and served as a member of the United States National Commission for UNESCO. He served three years as a nongovernmental observer at the United Nations.

Elected at the age of twenty-four, Johnson was the second-youngest person ever elected to the U.S. Congress, the youngest being William C. C. Claiborne. Taking his U.S. House seat just six days after his twenty-fifth birthday, he was the youngest House member to legally assume office. On November 15, 1964, twelve days after his election victory, Johnson appeared on the CBS Television Network quiz show What's My Line? featuring guest panelist Groucho Marx.

Johnson served as a Democrat to the 89th Congress from January 3, 1965, to January 3, 1967. Johnson voted in favor of the Voting Rights Act of 1965. He was an unsuccessful candidate for reelection in 1966 to the 90th Congress. He served as special assistant to the Director of the Office of Economic Opportunity from 1967 to 1968, and as a member of the Equal Employment Opportunity Commission from 1968 to 1972. He was also a consultant to the U.S. Senate Select Committee on Presidential Campaign Activities in 1973.

== Personal life ==
He resided in Alexandria, Virginia, and served as executive director of the United States Association of Former Members of Congress from 1974 until his death.

Johnson died in Falls Church, Virginia, on December 16, 1993, as the result of a cerebral aneurysm. He was survived by his wife, Sydney, and daughters Alice and Sydney.

U.S. House of Representatives
Preceded by Victor Wickersham	Member of the U.S. House of Representatives from Oklahoma's 6th congressional district 1965–1967	Succeeded by James Smith
