= Frank Lucas (Oklahoma politician) =

American politician (born 1960)

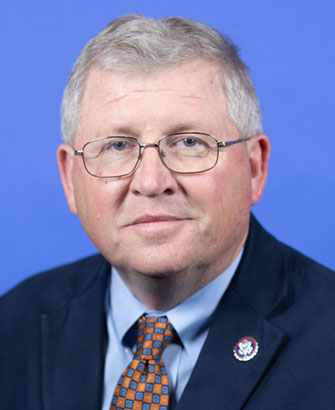
- Official portrait, 2022

Chair of the House Science Committee
- In office January 3, 2023 – January 3, 2025
- Preceded by: Eddie Bernice Johnson
- Succeeded by: Brian Babin

Ranking Member of the House Science Committee
- In office January 3, 2019 – January 3, 2023
- Preceded by: Eddie Bernice Johnson
- Succeeded by: Zoe Lofgren

Chair of the House Agriculture Committee
- In office January 3, 2011 – January 3, 2015
- Preceded by: Collin Peterson
- Succeeded by: Mike Conaway

Ranking Member of the House Agriculture Committee
- In office January 3, 2009 – January 3, 2011
- Preceded by: Bob Goodlatte
- Succeeded by: Collin Peterson

Member of the U.S. House of Representatives from Oklahoma
- Incumbent
- Assumed office May 10, 1994 (Note: Lucas's official service begins on the date of the special election, while he was not sworn in until May 17, 1994.)
- Preceded by: Glenn English
- Constituency: 6th district (1994–2003); 3rd district (2003–present)

Member of the Oklahoma House of Representatives from the 59th district
- In office January 3, 1989 – May 10, 1994
- Preceded by: Bert Russell
- Succeeded by: Clay Pope

Personal details
- Born: Frank Dean Lucas; January 6, 1960 (age 66) Cheyenne, Oklahoma, U.S.
- Party: Republican
- Spouse: Lynda Bradshaw (m. 1988)
- Children: 3
- Education: Oklahoma State University, Stillwater (BS)
- Website: House website Campaign website
- Lucas's voice Lucas supporting the Commercial Remote Sensing Act. Recorded January 30, 2023

Frank Dean Lucas (born January 6, 1960) is an American politician and farmer serving as the U.S. representative for Oklahoma's 3rd congressional district since 2003. A member of the Republican Party, he previously represented the 6th district from 1994 to 2003, prior to redistricting.

His district, which is massively rural, stretches from the Panhandle to the fringes of the Tulsa suburbs, covering almost half of the state's land mass. Lucas became the dean of Oklahoma's congressional delegation in 2023 following the retirement of Senator Jim Inhofe.

Prior to his election to the United States House of Representatives, he represented the 59th district of the Oklahoma House of Representatives from 1988 until his election to Congress in 1994.

== Early life and education ==
Prior to his election, Lucas worked as a farmer and rancher. He has a Bachelor's of Science from Oklahoma State University.

== Oklahoma House of Representatives ==
Lucas first ran for the Oklahoma House of Representatives 59th district in 1984 as a Republican against the incumbent Democrat, Rollin Reimer, but lost by about 2,000 votes. In 1986, he ran again in a three candidate Republican primary against Cecil E. Preston and Kyle Goerke. He was the Republican nominee, but narrowly lost to Bert Russell by under 100 votes. In 1988, his campaign was supported by $2,500 donation from Henry Bellmon. He defeated Russell in the November election with 56 percent of the vote. He represented the 59th district in the 42nd Oklahoma Legislature from 1989 until the 44th Legislature in 1994. He was succeeded in office by Clay Pope.

== U.S. House of Representatives (1994-present) ==
=== Tenure ===
On April 7, 2014, Lucas introduced the Customer Protection and End User Relief Act (H.R. 4413; 113th Congress) into the House. The bill would reauthorize the Commodity Futures Trading Commission through 2018 and amend some provisions of the Dodd–Frank Wall Street Reform and Consumer Protection Act.

On January 6, 2021, in the aftermath of the attack on the United States Capitol, Lucas joined 146 other Congressional Republicans in voting against the certification of the 2020 presidential election.

In 2022, Lucas was one of 39 Republicans to vote for the Merger Filing Fee Modernization Act of 2022, an antitrust package that would crack down on corporations for anti-competitive behavior.

Lucas has chaired the House Science, Space, and Technology Committee from 2023 to 2025.

=== Chair of the Science, Space and Technology committee ===
After Republicans won the House majority in the 2022 elections, Lucas became chair of the Science, Space and Technology Committee, which has jurisdiction over non-defense federal scientific research and development, including NASA, NSF, NIST, and the OSTP.

Lucas's agenda for the committee included independence for the National Oceanic and Atmospheric Administration, a federal program to develop unmanned drones, and research money for institutions other than those on the coasts.

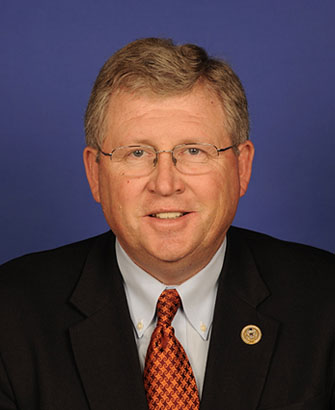
Frank Lucas (116th Congress)

=== Committee assignments ===
For the 119th Congress:

- Committee on Agriculture
  - Subcommittee on Commodity Markets, Digital Assets, and Rural Development
  - Subcommittee on Conservation, Research, and Biotechnology (Chairman)
  - Subcommittee on Nutrition and Foreign Agriculture
- Committee on Financial Services
  - Subcommittee on Capital Markets
  - Subcommittee on National Security, Illicit Finance, and International Financial Institutions

=== Caucus memberships ===
- Congressional Blockchain Caucus
- Congressional Taiwan Caucus
- Congressional Western Caucus
- United States–China Working Group

=== Political campaigns ===
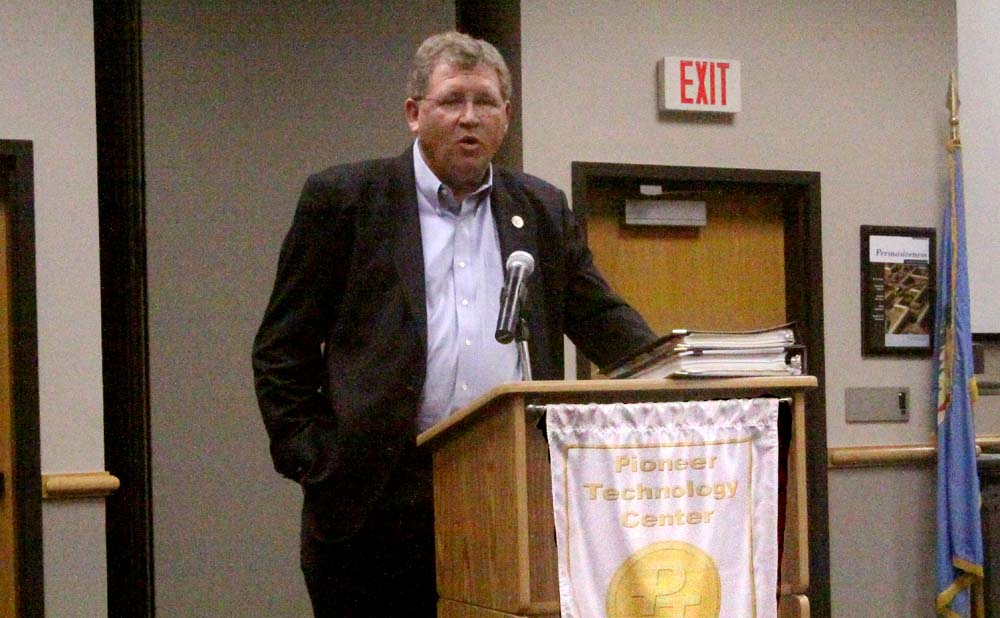
Oklahoma Congressman Frank Lucas speaks at a town hall meeting held in the Pioneer Technology Center in Ponca City, Oklahoma on September 26, 2011.

In 1994, 6th district Congressman Glenn English stepped down to become a lobbyist for rural electric cooperatives. Lucas won the Republican nomination for the special election on May 10. He faced Dan Webber, press secretary to U.S. Senator David L. Boren. The 6th was already by far the largest in the state, stretching from the Panhandle to the town of Spencer, in the far northeastern Oklahoma City metropolitan area. But the state legislature had redrawn it so that it included many poor Oklahoma City neighborhoods that had never voted Republican. Lucas scored a major upset, winning by eight percentage points and carrying 18 of the district's 24 counties. Some pundits have seen his victory as an early sign of the Republican Revolution that November, when Republicans took control of the House for the first time in 40 years. Lucas won a full term in November with 70% of the vote. He has been reelected seven times, never with less than 59% of the vote, and was unopposed in 2002 and 2004.

Lucas's district was renumbered as the 3rd after Oklahoma lost a district in the 2000 Census. His already vast district was made even larger. He lost most of his share of Oklahoma City, which was home to 60% of the district's population. He once represented much of the downtown area, including the site of the Alfred P. Murrah Federal Building. He still represented the part of the city in Canadian County. To make up for this large population loss, the 3rd was pushed farther east, picking up several of Tulsa's western suburbs (including a small portion of Tulsa itself) and some rural areas. As a result, his district now includes 48.5% of the state's landmass, and is nearly as large as the state's other four districts combined. He regained a share of Oklahoma County in the 2020 redistricting.

==== 2014 Republican primary ====
In the 2014 Republican primary, Lucas won 83% of the vote. 12% went to Robert Hubbard and 5% to Timothy Ray Murray.

==== 2024 Republican primary ====
Lucas only drew Republican primary challengers in 2024. He defeated Robyn Lynn Carder and Darren Hamilton in the June primary with 74% of the vote.

==== 2026 election ====
Lucas defeated challenger Wade Burleson in 2026 Republican primary with 71% of the vote. He faced Democratic nominee Suzie Byrd in the general election, defeating her with 64% of the vote.

== Electoral history ==
Oklahoma's 6th congressional district: Results 1992–2000
Year	Democratic	Votes	Pct	Republican	Votes	Pct	3rd Party	Party	Votes	Pct
1992	Glenn English *	134,734	68%	Bob Anthony	64,068	32%				
1994	Jeffrey S. Tollett	45,399	30%	Frank D. Lucas	106,961	70%				
1996	Paul M. Barby	64,173	36%	Frank D. Lucas	113,499	64%				
1998	Paul M. Barby	43,555	33%	Frank D. Lucas	85,261	65%	Ralph B. Finkle, Jr.	Independent	2,455	2%
2000	Randy Beutler	63,106	39%	Frank D. Lucas	95,635	59%	Joseph V. Cristiano	Libertarian	2,435	2%

* English resigned mid-term, and Lucas won the special election to succeed him against Democratic opponent Dan Webber.

Oklahoma's 3rd congressional district: Results 2002–2024
Year	Democratic	Votes	Pct	Republican	Votes	Pct	3rd Party	Party	Votes	Pct
2002	(no candidate)			Frank D. Lucas	148,206	76%	Robert T. Murphy	Independent	47,884	24%
2004	(no candidate)			Frank D. Lucas	215,510	82%	Gregory M. Wilson	Independent	46,621	18%
2006	Sue Barton	61,749	33%	Frank D. Lucas	128,042	67%				
2008	Frankie Robbins	62,297	24%	Frank D. Lucas	184,306	70%	Forrest Michael	Independent	17,756	7%
2010	Frankie Robbins	45,684	22%	Frank D. Lucas	161,915	78%				
2012	Timothy Ray Murray	53,472	20%	Frank D. Lucas	201,744	75%	William M. Sanders	Independent	12,787	5%
2014	Frankie Robbins	36,270	21%	Frank D. Lucas	133,335	79%				
2016	Frankie Robbins	63,090	22%	Frank D. Lucas	227,525	78%				
2018	Frankie Robbins	61,152	26%	Frank D. Lucas	172,913	74%				
2020	Zoe Midyett	66,501	22%	Frank D. Lucas	242,677	78%				
2022	Jeremiah Ross	50,354	25%	Frank D. Lucas	147,418	74%				
2024	(no candidate)			Frank D. Lucas	Uncontested					
2026	Suzie Byrd	68,832	36%	Frank D. Lucas	122,181	64%				

== Personal life ==
Lucas is a fifth-generation Oklahoman; his family has farmed in western Oklahoma for over 100 years. He lives in Cheyenne with his wife, Lynda. They have three children and three grandchildren. In August 2023, Lucas underwent hip surgery after being injured on his ranch.

U.S. House of Representatives
Preceded by Glenn English	Member of the U.S. House of Representatives from Oklahoma's 6th congressional district 1994–2003	Constituency abolished
Preceded by Wes Watkins	Member of the U.S. House of Representatives from Oklahoma's 3rd congressional district 2003–present	Incumbent
Preceded by Bob Goodlatte	Ranking Member of the House Agriculture Committee; 2009–2011	Succeeded by Collin Peterson
Preceded by Collin Peterson	Chair of the House Agriculture Committee; 2011–2015	Succeeded by Mike Conaway
Preceded by Eddie Bernice Johnson	Ranking Member of the House Science Committee; 2019–2023	Succeeded by Zoe Lofgren
Preceded by Eddie Bernice Johnson	Chair of the House Science Committee; 2023–2025	Succeeded by Brian Babin
U.S. order of precedence (ceremonial)
Preceded by Bennie Thompson	United States representatives by seniority 17th	Succeeded by Lloyd Doggett
Preceded by Bennie Thompson	Order of precedence of the United States	Succeeded by Lloyd Doggett
