= List of women CEOs of Fortune 500 companies =

This is a list of women CEOs of the Fortune 500, based on the magazine's 2024 list (updated yearly). As of Sept. 2024, women were CEOs at 10.4% of Fortune 500 companies.

== Fortune 500 women CEOs as of 2024 (52 women) ==
CEO	Company	Fortune 500 rank	Start date
Mary T. Barra	General Motors	19	January 1, 2014
Gail K. Boudreaux	Elevance Health	20	November 1, 2017
Jane Fraser	Citigroup	21	February 1, 2021
Sarah London	Centene	22	March 1, 2022
Priscilla Almodovar	Fannie Mae	27	December 1, 2022
Carol B. Tomé	United Parcel Service	45	June 1, 2020
Susan Patricia Griffith	Progressive	62	July 1, 2016
Safra A. Catz	Oracle	89	September 1, 2014
Thasunda Brown Duckett	TIAA	96	May 1, 2021
Corie S. Barry	Best Buy	100	June 1, 2019
Phebe N. Novakovic	General Dynamics	104	January 1, 2013
Kathy J. Warden	Northrop Grumman	109	January 1, 2019
Jennifer Rumsey	Cummins	129	August 1, 2022
Lynn J. Good	Duke Energy	148	July 1, 2013
Vicki A. Hollub	Occidental Petroleum	149	April 1, 2016
Patricia K. Poppe	PG&E	167	January 1, 2021
Heidi G. Petz	Sherwin-Williams	176	January 1, 2024
Lisa T. Su	Advanced Micro Devices	181	August 1, 2014
Christine A. Leahy	CDW	189	January 1, 2019
Barbara Rentler	Ross Stores	201	June 1, 2014
Jennifer A. Parmentier	Parker-Hannifin	216	January 1, 2023
Maria Black	Automatic Data Processing	228	January 1, 2023
Beth E. Ford	Land O'Lakes	245	August 1, 2018
Kim Dang	Kinder Morgan	268	August 1, 2023
Julie Sweet	Accenture	280	January 1, 2023
Stephanie L. Ferris	Fidelity National Information Services	288	January 1, 2023
Kathleen E. Johnson	Lumen Technologies	292	November 1, 2022
Judith F. Marks	Otis Worldwide	301	April 1, 2020
Penny Pennington	Jones Financial (Edward Jones)	303	January 1, 2019
Lauren R. Hobart	Dick's Sporting Goods	313	February 1, 2021
Ariane Gorin	Expedia	315	May 1, 2024
Lori D. Koch	DuPont	327	June 1, 2024
Ellen G. Cooper	Lincoln National	354	May 1, 2022
Michele G. Buck	Hershey	361	March 1, 2017
Kathleen M. Mazzarella	Graybar Electric	367	June 1, 2012
Joey Wat	Yum China Holdings	368	March 1, 2018
Lori J. Ryerkerk	Celanese	369	May 1, 2019
Reshma Kewalramani	Vertex Pharmaceuticals	400	April 1, 2020
Teresa J. Rasmussen	Thrivent Financial For Lutherans	405	October 1, 2018
Joanna Geraghty	Jetblue Airways	413	February 1, 2024
Joyce A. Mullen	Insight Enterprises	427	December 1, 2021
Kristin C. Peck	Zoetis	445	January 1, 2020
Adaire Fox-Martin	Equinix	456	June 1, 2024
Mary N. Dillon	Foot Locker	458	September 1, 2022
Jennifer M. Johnson	Franklin Resources	468	February 1, 2020
Laura J. Alber	Williams-Sonoma	474	May 1, 2010
Toni Townes-Whitley	Science Applications International	479	October 1, 2023
Gina R. Boswell	Bath & Body Works	481	December 1, 2022
Sheryl D. Palmer	Taylor Morrison Home	483	November 1, 2012
Linda Rendle	Clorox	485	September 1, 2020
Heather H. Lavallee	Voya Financial	487	January 1, 2023

== Fortune 500 CEOs by gender over time ==
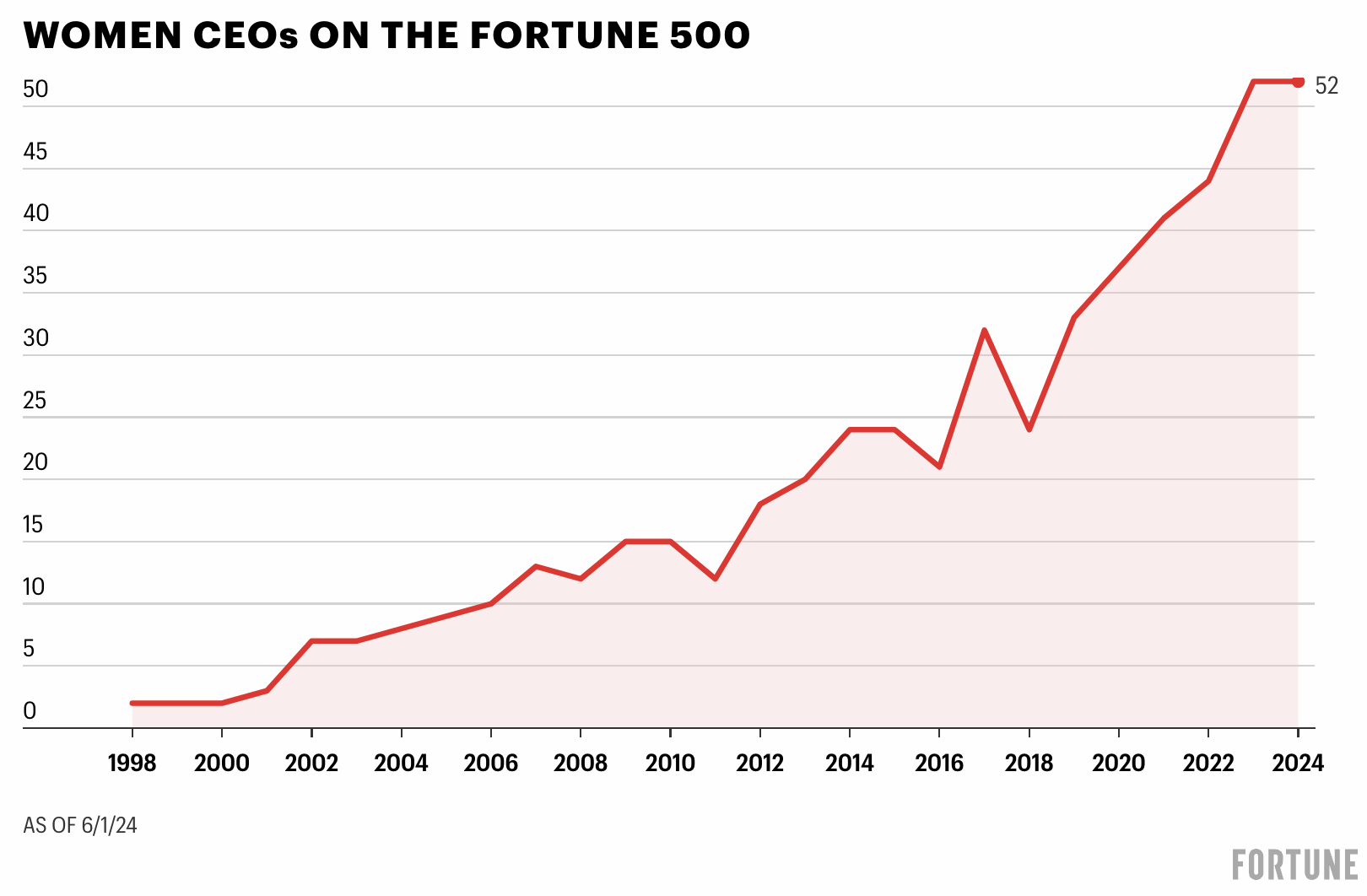

Over the last 10 years, 50-75% of Fortune 500 Women CEOs have been promoted from within their company.

== See also ==
- Fortune 500
- List of Fortune 500 computer software and information companies
- 40 under 40
- Women in business
