= Dr. Rick =

Fictional character in Progressive Corporation advertisements

- Created by: Arnold Worldwide
- Portrayed by: Bill Glass
- Company: Progressive Corporation

Dr. Rick is a fictional character appearing in advertisements for Progressive Corporation insurance. The character, portrayed by Bill Glass, is a self-help coach who advises new homeowners on how to avoid "turning into" their parents.

== Concept and creation ==
In 2015, the chief marketing officer of Progressive Corporation, Jeff Charney, began searching for ideas for a new advertising campaign that would revolve around the "stages of life". Charney eventually decided to use the idea of parental introjection. After consulting with psychologists, Charney and his team found that people tend to experience this phenomenon after buying their first home.

Initially, Arnold Worldwide created a series of advertisements that focused on "parentamorphosis", a portmanteau of "parent" and "metamorphosis". The advertising firm created Dr. Rick for a 2017 "parentamorphosis" advertisement where he was identified as "Rick". The campaign soon evolved to feature Dr. Rick as its central character.

== Appearances ==
As of July 2026, Dr. Rick, who is portrayed by actor Bill Glass, has appeared in 41 commercials for Progressive:

1. "Group Session" (October 2017) – The original 90-second test commercial that established the support group format for young homeowners experiencing parentamorphosis.

2. "First Contact" (March 2020)

3. "Grounded" / "The Seminar" (April 2020)

4. "Pillows" (June 2020)

5. "Methods" / "Groad" (July 2020)

6. "Shopping Mall" (August 2020)

7. "Seminar: Act 2" (February 2021) – Released for Super Bowl LV.

8. "Voicemail" (March 2021)

9. "The Plan" (April 2021)

10. "Airport" (July 2021)

11. "Fast Casual" (November 2021)

12. "Movies" (March 2022)

13. "Elevator" (July 2022)

14. "Trash Cans" (September 2022)

15. "Book Signing" (January 2023) – A commercial centering on the real-world promotional release of Dr. Rick's companion book, Dr. Rick Will See You Now.

16. "Beyond Help" (May 2023)

17. "Jobsite" / "Construction Zone" (July 2023)

18. "Game Day Shopping" (September 2023)

19. "Weather" (July 2024)

20. "Hot Ones Special" (October 2024) – A cross-promotional interview short featuring Dr. Rick eating spicy wings on the First We Feast network talk show.

21. "Neighborhood Mayor" (January 2025)

22. "Firepit" (January 2025)

23. "Bathroom Door" (February 2025)

24. "Gas Stations" (March 2025)

25. "Letting Go" (April 2025)

26. "Tailgate" (June 2025)

27. "Fun Seminar" / "Work vs. Fun" (July 2025)

28. "Photo Op" (September 2025)

29. "Scared Straight" (September 2025)

30. "Valets" (December 2025)

31. "Rules" (March 2026)

32. "Magnet" (March 2026)

33. "You Are Not Your Parents: A Dr. Rick Podcast Special" (March 2026) - 15 minute long form spot

34. "Zipper" (March 2026)

35. "Waiting Room" (June 2026)

36. "Rideshare" (July 2026)

37. "Let It Out" (July 2026)

38. "Guest Speaker" (August 2026)

39. "Tuning In" (September 2026)

40. "Food for Thought" (November 2026)

41. "Gifts" (November 2026)

In 2021, Progressive released a book titled Dr. Rick Will See You Now. The book, which was advertised as being authored by Dr. Rick, is a comedic guide containing the character's teachings. Progressive has published 5,000 copies of the 119-page book.

== Reception ==
According to a 2022 poll by Ad Age and The Harris Poll, Dr. Rick has a 59% favorability rating and a 54% awareness rating, making him the seventh-most popular insurance advertisement character in the United States.

The Dr. Rick commercials have received praise for their relatability. Barbara Mellers, a marketing and psychology professor at the University of Pennsylvania, also noted that the campaign's simplicity and surprise factor are what makes the character successful: "I think we all experience it, but I don’t know how much has been written on it or how broad a topic it is in the general conversation of life." According to Ad Age, viewers respond well to the character's dry humor.

== See also ==
- Flo (Progressive Insurance)
