= Rodney Martin =

Rodney Martin may refer to:

- Rodney Martin (sprinter) (born 1982), American sprinter
- Rodney Martin (squash player) (born 1965), Australian squash player
- Rodney O. Martin Jr. (born 1952), American business executive
