= Jeff Charney =

- Born: Michael "Jeff" Charney; 1959 (age 66–67)
- Education: Palmetto High School (1977); University of South Carolina (BA, 1981); Ohio State University (MA, 1982)
- Occupation: Marketing executive
- Years active: 1980s–present
- Known for: Creating advertising campaigns featuring Progressive's Flo, Dr. Rick, Motaur, and the Aflac Duck
- Awards: Ad Age A-List Brand CMO of the Year (2021); Adweek Marketer of the Year (2011); Ad Age Creativity 50 (2012); Fast Company 100 Most Creative People #35 (2012); Ohio State University Distinguished Alumni Award (2022)

Michael "Jeff" Charney is an American executive who served as Chief Marketing Officer (CMO) of Aflac, Progressive, and QVC . In the advertising community, he is known for developing campaigns featuring company brand icons such as Progressive's Flo and Dr. Rick and the Aflac Duck. He has won Adweek's the Marketer of the Year and Brand Genius award, Ad Age's Creativity 50 and he was ranked #35 on Fast Company's 100 Most Creative People in 2012.

== Education ==
Charney attended Palmetto High School in Williamson, South Carolina, graduating in 1977. Charney graduated from the University of South Carolina with a degree in advertising/public relations in 1981. He went on to earn his master's degree in journalism at Ohio State University in 1982.

== Career ==
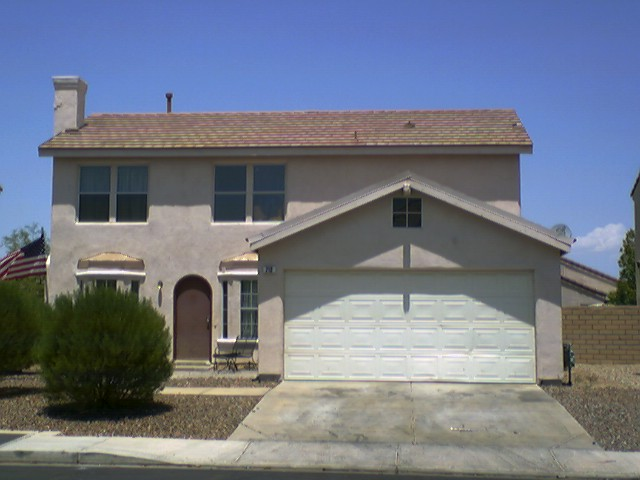
The Simpsons replica house in Henderson, Nevada, the building of which was organized by Charney.

In 1997, he was the head of marketing at Kaufman and Broad (now known as KB Home). Charney organized the building of a real-life replica of the Simpson family's house in Nevada as a joint promotion for Kaufman and Broad and The Simpsons.

Charney went on to serve as senior vice president of marketing and communications for Homestore.com. While working for Homestore.com, Charney helped produce the Chris Smith-directed documentary film Home Movie, which became the first film produced by a private company to be shown at the Sundance Film Festival.

After leaving his position at Homestore.com, Charney was appointed CMO of QVC in 2005. He oversaw the company's "iQdoU?" advertising campaign in 2007.

In 2008, he joined Aflac. He developed multiple marketing campaigns featuring the Aflac Duck, which was created for Aflac by the Kaplan Thaler Group. These included campaigns such as "You Don't Know Quack," "Get the Aflacts," and a cross-promotion with the film Up.

Charney left his position at Aflac to join Progressive in 2010. During his tenure at Progressive, Charney created the character Dr. Rick and further developed the character Flo, adding more improv elements to her commercials. Other advertising characters Charney created include Motaur and the Sign Spinner. He also developed Progressive commercials starring athletes such as NFL quarterback Baker Mayfield and LeBron James.

== Awards ==
Adweek gave Charney the Marketer of the Year and Brand Genius award in the Insurance category in 2011. Charney was also named to Ad Age's Creativity 50 and was ranked #35 on Fast Company's 100 Most Creative People in 2012.

For his work on Progressive's advertising campaigns, Charney received Ad Age's A-List Brand CMO of the Year award in 2021.

He received the Distinguished Alumni Award from Ohio State University in 2022.
