= Heather H. Lavallee =

- Education: Colby College (BA); Pepperdine University (MBA)
- Occupation: Business executive
- Employer: Voya Financial
- Known for: Chief executive officer of Voya Financial
- Title: President and chief executive officer of Voya Financial
- Predecessor: Rodney O. Martin Jr.

Heather H. Lavallee is an American business executive and the president and CEO of Voya Financial. She has also served in executive roles at the company, including its Wealth Solutions chief executive officer and president of its Tax-Exempt Markets and Employee Benefits businesses.

== Education ==
Lavallee earned a bachelor's degree in psychology from Colby College and a Master of Business Administration from Pepperdine University's Graziadio Business School. She has also served on the board of the Council for Economic Education.

== Career ==
Lavallee began her financial career in 1992 as a sales representative at Sun Life Financial.

From 2005 to 2008, she served as regional vice president of the Group Insurance Division for the Western Region at Mutual of Omaha.

In 2008, Lavallee joined Voyal Financial. In 2011, she was promoted to president of Employee Benefits Distribution. Her responsibilities included the company's group and voluntary insurance distribution teams and marketing efforts in the United States. In 2014, Voya Financial appointed her president of its Employee Benefits business, with responsibility for areas including strategy, product management, underwriting, actuarial operations and distribution.

Three years later, Lavallee was named president of the company's Employee Benefits business, with responsibility for areas including strategy, product management, underwriting, actuarial operations and distribution.

In 2016, Lavallee became president of Voya's Tax-Exempt Markets business. Lavallee subsequently became chief executive officer of Voya's Wealth Solutions business. In July 2022, the company announced that she would succeed Rodney O. Martin Jr. as CEO of Voya Financial the following January. She also joined the company's board of directors in July 2022.

== Philanthropic efforts and awards ==
Lavallee was the first executive sponsor of Voya Cares, an initiative focused on people with disabilities and special needs and their caregivers. In 2023, she became CEO of Voya Financial while continuing to oversee the company's overall strategy and performance.

In 2022, Lavallee received the Hartford Business Journal's Top 25 Women in Business recognition. In 2023, she was included in Forbes' 50 Over 50 list, according to biographical profiles published by the Women's Business Collaborative and ABILITY Magazine.
