= Patti Poppe =

American businesswoman and business executive

- Born: Patricia Kessler Poppe; 1969 or 1970 (age 56–57)
- Education: Purdue University; Stanford University
- Title: CEO, PG&E; Former CEO and president, CMS Energy
- Spouse: Eric Poppe

Patricia Kessler Poppe (born 1969) is an American businesswoman and business executive. Poppe is the first female executive to serve as the CEO of one Fortune 500 and become CEO of another. She was president and CEO of CMS Energy from July 2016 to December 2020. In November 2020, it was announced that she would be leaving CMS Energy and joining PG&E as CEO starting January 4, 2021.

== Early life and education ==
Born in 1969, Poppe spent her childhood in Jackson, Michigan. Her mother, Mary Ann Kessler, was a school principal and teacher, while her father, William Kessler, was a nuclear engineer for Consumers Energy. Poppe graduated from Napoleon High School in Jackson County. She has bachelor's and master's degrees in industrial engineering from Purdue University, in 1989 and 1991, and a master's degree in management from Stanford University's Graduate School of Business in 2005.

== Career ==
=== GM and DTE Energy ===
Poppe began working for General Motors in 1990, and held several positions for 15 years. In 2005 she joined DTE Energy as a power plant director, then becoming director of energy optimization.

=== CMS Energy ===
In December 2010 Consumers Energy announced that it had hired her, and the first of the next year, Poppe joined CMS Energy in 2011, when she became VP of customer operations. From November 15, 2013 to January 2015 she was VP of customer experience. From January 2015 she was senior vice president of distribution operations, engineering and transmission starting in March 2015, before becoming CEO in July 2016, succeeding John Russell. She also became president-elect, with the positive effective on July 1, 2016. She remained president in 2017. In February 2017, she co-wrote a guest column for Michigan Live in support of a new non-discrimination ordinance.

In 2016, Crain's Detroit Business named her one of 100 Most Influential Women. She is an inductee into the Automotive Hall of Fame.

In November 2020, it was announced that Poppe would be leaving CMS Energy on December 1, 2020 to become CEO of Pacific Gas & Electric on January 4, 2021. In April 2022, it was reported that PG&E CEO Patti Poppe received over $50 million in total direct compensation for her work in 2021.

== Boards ==
As of 2016, she was involved with Michigan Women's Foundation-Power of 100 Women and the Detroit Regional Chamber, Business Leaders for Michigan; advisory boards for the Jackson Symphony Orchestra; Board of Directors for AEGIS Limited; and Purdue University Society of Women Engineers Industrial.

== Personal life ==
Poppe's husband Eric works for General Motors. They have two children and as of 2021, live in Lafayette, California.

== See also ==
- List of women CEOs of Fortune 500 companies
