= Napoleon Community Schools =

School district in Michigan, United States

Address
- 200 West Street Napoleon, Jackson County, Michigan, 49261; United States
- Coordinates: 42.1640236°N 84.2489127°W

District information
- Motto: Tradition starts here.
- Grades: Pre-Kindergarten-12
- Superintendent: Patrick Dillon
- Schools: 4
- Budget: $18,471,000 2022-2023 expenditures
- NCES District ID: 2624960

Students and staff
- Students: 1,290 (2024-2025)
- Teachers: 68.97 (on an FTE basis) (2024-2025)
- Staff: 139.15 FTE (2024-2025)
- Student–teacher ratio: 18.7(2024-2025)
- Athletic conference: Cascades
- District mascot: Pirates
- Colors: Green & White

Other information
- Website: www.napoleonschools.org

Napoleon Community Schools is a public school district in Jackson County, Michigan. It serves Napoleon and parts of the townships of Columbia, Grass Lake, Napoleon, and Norvell.

== History ==
Napoleon's high school has existed since at least 1887, when it was mentioned in a local newspaper that six students graduated.

In 1919, voters in the Napoleon district and four neighboring rural school districts voted to consolidate into a single district. Controversies and lawsuits ensued over taxation to fund a new school building. Ultimately, a new school opened in fall 1923. It contained all grades.

The 1949 high school yearbook describes the district’s early school bus system. In the year of consolidation, students were transported by horse-drawn wagons and sleighs. The district purchased its first motorized school bus in 1924. For several years, buses consisted of wooden bodies mounted on truck chassis, until steel-bodied buses were introduced in 1936. By 1949, the district operated a fleet of twelve buses transporting 620 students.

Ezra Eby Elementary, named after a long-serving district superintendent, was dedicated on November 8, 1953. The architect was Guido A. Binda Associates of Battle Creek. Despite the new facilities, the district was overcrowded by 1955 and was considering half-day sessions to save space, but voters rejected a construction bond issue later that year. However, in 1957, Ackerson Lake school and a new addition at Eby Elementary were built.

In 1960, the current high school was built. It opened in January 1961, and the former central school building became a junior high building. The high school was renovated with new science labs, a new roof and facades in 2013.

The current middle school was dedicated on February 22, 1981.

In 2016, the school district went to the U.S. Supreme Court over not allowing access for a disabled student's service dog in Fry v. Napoleon Community Schools. The Supreme Court ruled that the United States Court of Appeals for the Sixth Circuit, which originally ruled that the student's family could not sue the school district, must reconsider.

== Schools ==
Schools in Napoleon Community Schools district
School	Address	Notes
Napoleon High School	201 West Street, Napoleon	Grades 9–12. Built 1960.
Napoleon Middle School	204 West Street, Napoleon	Grades 6–8. Built 1981.
Ezra Eby Elementary School	220 West Street, Napoleon	Grades K–5. Built 1953.
Pirates Cove Childcare & Preschool	220 West Street, Napoleon	Preschool within Ezra Eby Elementary
Ackerson Lake Alternative High School	121 W Brooklyn Road, Napoleon	Alternative school. Grades 9–12
