= VOYA =

Voya or VOYA can mean:

- Voya Financial - A spinoff created from the North American banking operations of the ING Group (cf.)
- Voice of Youth Advocates - a bimonthly magazine for young adults
