= Napoleon High School (Michigan) =

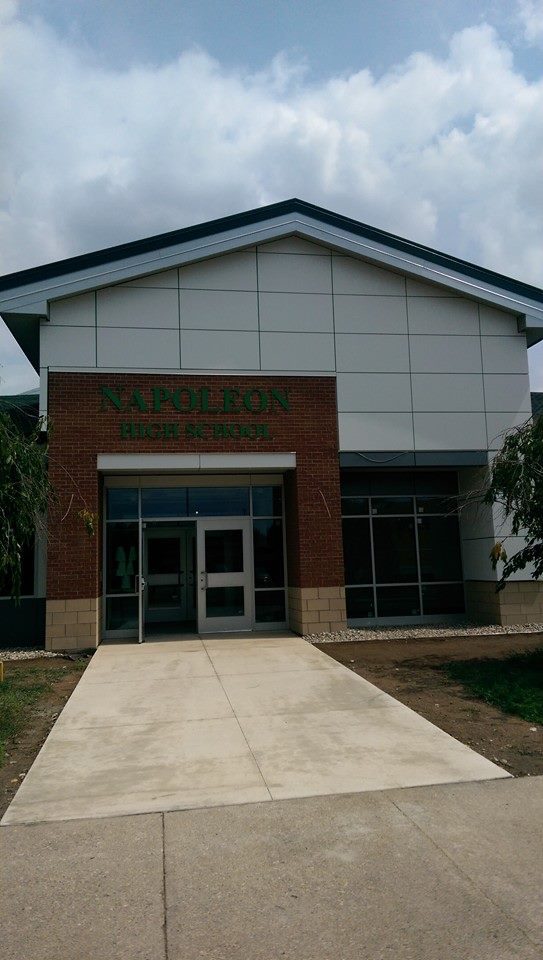

Location
- 201 West Street; Napoleon, Michigan 49261; United States; 42°09′54″N 84°14′52″W

Information
- Type: Public
- Motto: Proudly Charting the Course for Success
- School district: Napoleon Community Schools
- Superintendent: James E. Graham
- Principal: Pat Dillon
- Teaching staff: 17.10 (FTE)
- Grades: 9-12
- Enrollment: 365 (2022-23)
- Student to teacher ratio: 21.35
- Colors: Green and white
- Nickname: Pirates
- Rivals: Columbia Central High School
- Website: www.napoleonschools.org/o/napoleonhighschool

Napoleon High School is a public high school located in Jackson County, Michigan, United States. With an enrollment of 432 students, it is classified as a Class C school by the Michigan High School Athletic Association (MHSAA). The school's mascot is the Pirate, and athletic teams compete in the Cascades Conference with Addison, East Jackson, Hanover-Horton, Grass Lake, Michigan Center, Manchester, and Vandercook Lake. Napoleon High School services students from Napoleon and Norvell Townships, as well as outlying areas of Columbia and Grass Lake Townships as a part of Napoleon Community Schools.

== History ==
The current Napoleon High School building, located at 201 West Ave, was built in 1959. Prior to that, a building was located across the street, on the current site of Napoleon Middle School.

=== Renovation ===
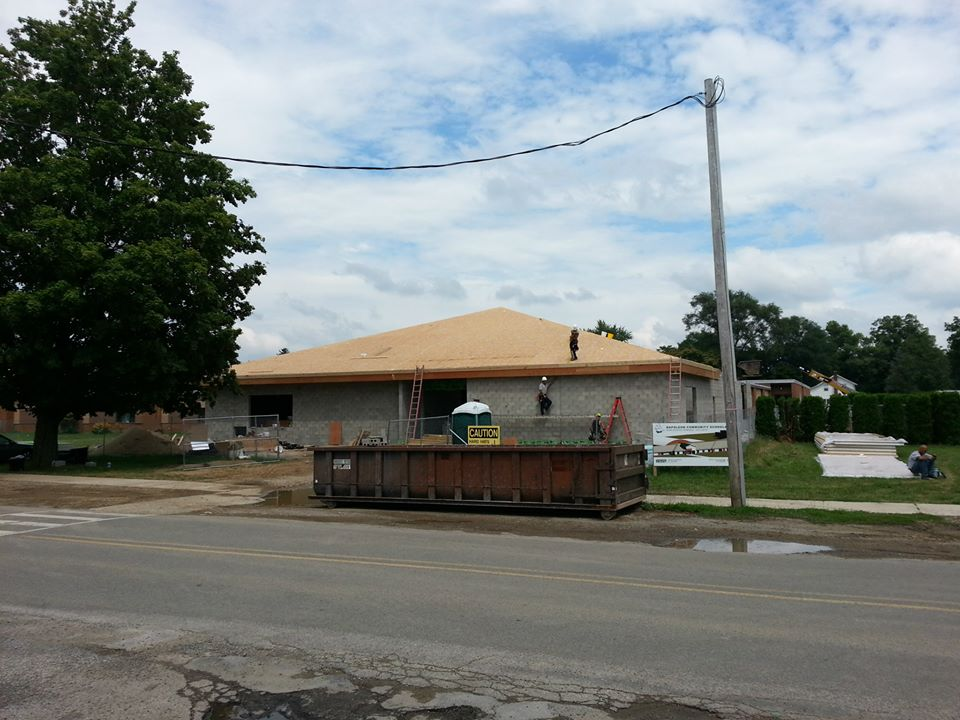
Science wing addition

In September 2013, district residents passed a $13.1 bond issue to renovate Napoleon High School. The bond issue allowed for the creation of state of the art science labs, as well as numerous upgrades to facilities, including a renovated cafetorium (cafeteria/auditorium multi-use space), new pitched roof replacing original flat roof, renovated weight room, gymnasium, and band room. The bond also provided for technology upgrades.

== Demographics ==
The demographic breakdown of the 426 students enrolled in 2013-2014 was:

- Male - 52.6%
- Female - 47.4%
- Native American/Alaskan - 0.5%
- Asian/Pacific islanders - 0.2%
- Black - 1.4%
- Hispanic - 4.2%
- White - 91.6%
- Multiracial - 2.1%

36.4% of the students were eligible for free or reduced lunch.

== Academics ==
Napoleon High School has performed higher than the state and county averages on the Michigan Merit Exam. In 2012, Napoleon ranked third in Social Studies proficiency within Jackson County.

== Athletics ==
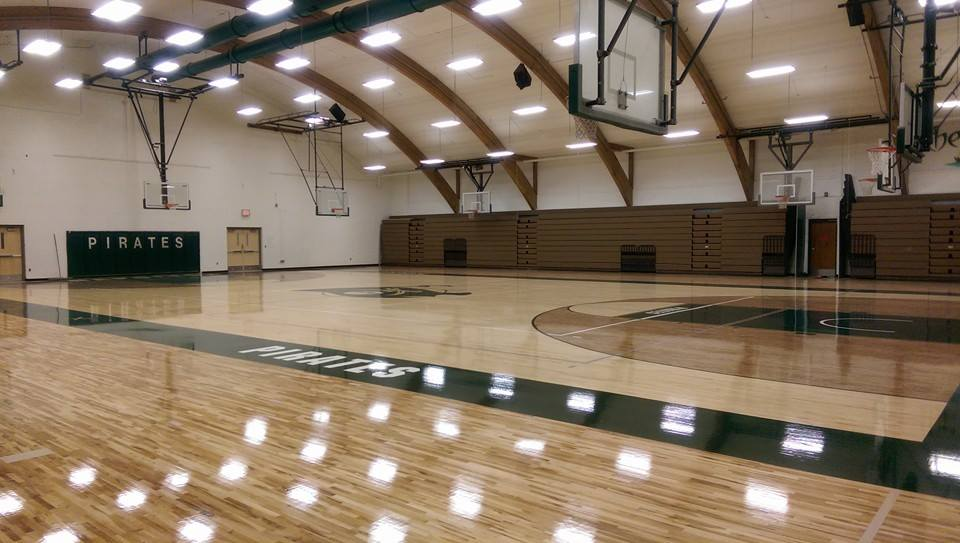
NHS gym

Sports currently available to Napoleon students include basketball, baseball/softball, cross country, competitive cheer, football, golf, track & field, volleyball, bowling, band, and wrestling. The school is a member of the MHSAA.

=== State championships ===
Between 1931, and 1949, 16 state championship cross country meets were held in the state of Michigan; during that time, Napoleon won nine state championships, and finished second five times.

Year	Sport
1931	Boys' cross country
1934	Boys' cross country
1935	Boys' cross country
1936	Boys' cross country
1939	Boys' cross country
1940	Boys' cross country
1943	Boys' cross country
1944	Boys' cross country
1949	Boys' cross country

== Notable alumni ==
- Patti Poppe - CEO of Pacific Gas and Electric Company
- Brian Stuard - PGA golfer
