= Napoleon, Michigan =

- Census-designated place (CDP) & unincorporated community
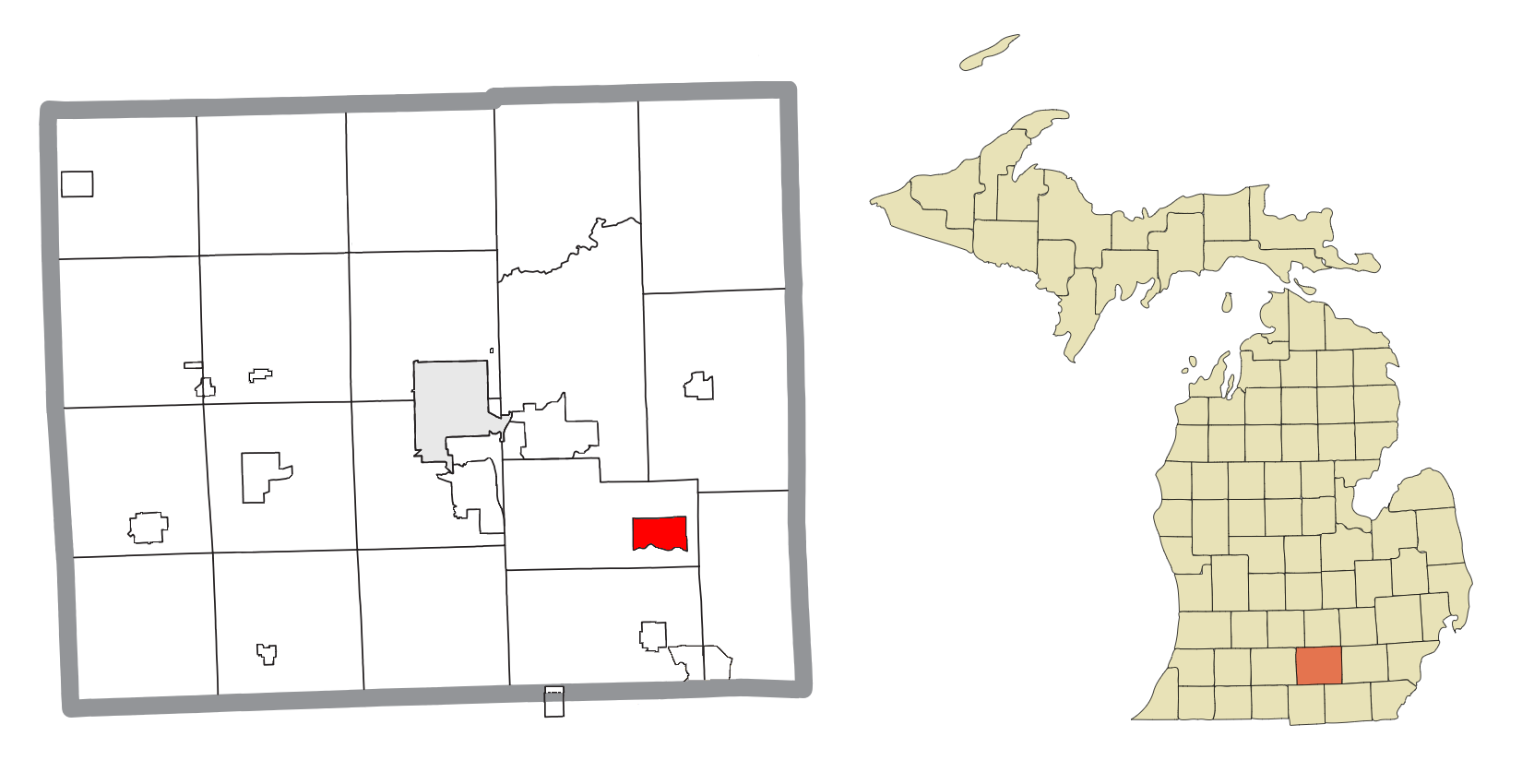
- Location within Jackson County

- Location within the state of Michigan Napoleon (the United States)
- Coordinates: 42°09′38″N 84°14′46″W
- Country: United States
- State: Michigan
- County: Jackson
- Township: Napoleon

Area
  - Total: 2.64 sq mi (6.85 km^{2})
  - Land: 2.62 sq mi (6.79 km^{2})
  - Water: 0.023 sq mi (0.06 km^{2})
- Elevation: 961 ft (293 m)

Population (2020)
  - Total: 1,131
  - Density: 431.6/sq mi (166.63/km^{2})
- Time zone: UTC-5 (Eastern (EST))
  - Summer (DST): UTC-4 (EDT)
- ZIP code(s): 49261
- Area code: 517
- FIPS code: 26-56620
- GNIS feature ID: 633212

Napoleon is an unincorporated community and census-designated place (CDP) in Jackson County in the U.S. state of Michigan. As of the 2020 census, Napoleon had a population of 1,131. It is located within Napoleon Township.

== Geography ==
According to the United States Census Bureau, the CDP has a total area of 2.64 square miles (6.84 km^{2}), of which 2.62 square miles (6.79 km^{2}) is land and 0.02 square miles (0.05 km^{2}) (0.76%) is water.

Napoleon is in southeastern Jackson County, in the eastern part of Napoleon Township. State highway M-50 passes through the center of town, leading northwest 10 miles (16 km) to Jackson, the county seat, and south 4 miles (6.4 km) to Brooklyn.

== Demographics ==
Historical population
Census	Pop.	Note	%±
2020	1,131		—
U.S. Decennial Census

As of the census of 2000, there were 1,254 people, 473 households, and 340 families residing in the CDP. The population density was 472.5 inhabitants per square mile (182.4/km^{2}). There were 498 housing units at an average density of 187.7 per square mile (72.5/km^{2}). The racial makeup of the CDP was 96.89% White, 0.24% Black or African American, 0.24% Native American, 0.08% Asian, 1.12% from other races, and 1.44% from two or more races. Hispanic or Latino of any race were 2.15% of the population.

There were 473 households, out of which 37.2% had children under the age of 18 living with them, 50.3% were married couples living together, 13.5% had a female householder with no husband present, and 28.1% were non-families. 24.3% of all households were made up of individuals, and 8.5% had someone living alone who was 65 years of age or older. The average household size was 2.65 and the average family size was 3.05.

In the CDP, the population was spread out, with 30.6% under the age of 18, 6.3% from 18 to 24, 30.6% from 25 to 44, 22.1% from 45 to 64, and 10.4% who were 65 years of age or older. The median age was 34 years. For every 100 females, there were 100.6 males. For every 100 females age 18 and over, there were 92.1 males.

The median income for a household in the CDP was $39,737, and the median income for a family was $41,464. Males had a median income of $31,842 versus $23,705 for females. The per capita income for the CDP was $14,932. About 8.5% of families and 9.3% of the population were below the poverty line, including 11.9% of those under age 18 and 9.9% of those age 65 or over.

== Education ==
The school system in Napoleon CDP is managed by the Napoleon Community Schools. This includes Napoleon High School and Napoleon Middle School, and Ezra Eby Elementary.

== Highways ==
- M-50
