= Jim Cashman (actor) =

American actor

- Occupation: Actor
- Years active: 1999–present

Jim Cashman is an American actor and writer, known for his role as "Jamie" in television and radio commercials for the Progressive Corporation beginning in 2014.

== Early life and career ==
Cashman is from Las Vegas, Nevada, and started his comedy career at The Groundlings sketch comedy troupe and school in Los Angeles, California. He wrote material for Benched, The Looney Tunes Show, and Saturday Night Live.

In his recurring role in the commercials, Cashman plays Jamie, a sidekick of fellow actor Stephanie Courtney in her role as Flo. He has appeared in several television series including It's Always Sunny in Philadelphia, Grey's Anatomy, and Just Shoot Me! He appeared in the film The Boss in 2016.

== Personal life ==
Cashman has been married to Michelle Noh since November 15, 2003.
