= Barbara Rentler =

American businesswoman

- Occupations: Former CEO, Ross stores Merchandising strategies, Ross stores
- Years active: 1986–present
- Spouse: James Tighe

Barbara Rentler (born between 1947 and 1948) is an American businesswoman, and was CEO of Ross Stores Inc, a Fortune 500 company, from 2014 to 2025.

== Career ==
Rentler joined Ross Stores in February 1986. She held a variety of merchandising jobs until February 2001, when she became Senior Vice President and General Merchandise Manager at Ross Dress for Less. Rentler held those positions until January 2004, when she became Senior Vice President and Chief Merchandising Officer at dd's DISCOUNTS.

From February 2005 until December 2006, Rentler was Executive Vice President and Chief Merchandising Officer of dd's DISCOUNTS. Beginning in December 2006 Rentler took on the responsibility of Executive Vice President of Merchandising. She was responsible for all Ross Apparel and Apparel-related products.

In December 2009, she was appointed the President and Chief Merchandising Officer at Ross Dress for Less. After less than five years, Rentler was promoted to chief executive officer on May 7, 2014. On June 1, 2014, she took over as CEO upon the retirement of the previous CEO, Michael Balmuth.

Rentler was the only woman among 100 individuals named to Forbes' "America's Most Innovative Leaders" list in 2019.

In March 2021, Ross Stores announced her appointment as Vice Board Chair, effective May 19, 2021.

While Rentler was expected to stay on as CEO of Ross Stores through 2026, it was announced in October 2024 that James Conroy will succeed Rentler as the company’s new CEO effective February 2, 2025. Rentler will stay with Ross in merchandising strategies through March 2027.

== Compensation ==
In 2023, Rentler received total compensation from Ross Stores of $18.1 million, or 2,100 times what the median employee at Ross Stores earned that same year.
