= Tricia Griffith =

American business executive (born 1964)

- Born: Susan Patricia Griffith; October 1964 (age 61–62)
- Education: Illinois State University, University of Pennsylvania, Wharton School
- Occupation: Business executive
- Years active: 1988–present
- Employer(s): The Progressive Corporation (President and CEO)

Tricia Griffith (born October 1964) is an American business executive who is the president and chief executive officer of the Progressive Corporation.

Griffith is a member of The Business Council.

== Early life and education ==
Griffith attended Illinois State University for her undergraduate degree, and then took part in the advanced management program at the Wharton School.

== Career ==
Griffith was appointed president and chief executive officer and elected to the Board of Directors of the Progressive Corporation in July 2016. She was the first female to hold this position in the history of the company.

Griffith joined Progressive as a claims representative in 1988 and has served in many key leadership positions during her tenure. She held several managerial positions in the Claims division before being named Chief Human Resources Officer in 2002. As Chief Human Resources Officer, Griffith launched Progressive's first-ever diversity and inclusion program, establishing the Progressive African American Network and LGBT Plus in 2007. In 2008, she returned to Claims as the group president, overseeing all claims functions. Prior to being named Chief Operating Officer of Personal Lines, Griffith was President of Customer Operations.

In 2018, Griffith was elected to the FedEx board of directors.

== Recognition ==
- In November 2018, Griffith was the first woman to be named Fortune's Businessperson of the Year.
- Griffith was featured as Fortune's 13th Most Powerful Businesswoman in November 2018.
- Forbes ranked Griffith as the 53rd most powerful woman in the world in 2023.
- She was ranked 22nd on Fortune's list of Most Powerful Women in 2023.

== See also ==
- List of women CEOs of Fortune 500 companies
