= Gina R. Boswell =

- Education: Boston University (BS); Yale School of Management (MBA)
- Occupation: Business executive
- Known for: Former chief executive officer of Bath & Body Works
- Board member of: The Clorox Company
- Awards: Yale Medal (2022); CEW Achiever of the Year (2011)

Gina R. Boswell is an American business executive in the consumer goods, beauty, and personal care industries. She is the former chief executive officer of Bath & Body Works and held additional senior executive roles at Unilever, Alberto-Culver, Avon, Ford Motor Company, and Estée Lauder.

== Early life and education ==
Boswell studied accounting at Boston University, where she graduated in 1984. She subsequently earned a master's degree in public and private management from Yale School of Management in 1989.

== Career ==
Following her graduation from Boston University, Boswell worked at Arthur Andersen, an accounting firm. She subsequently joined the management consulting firm Marakon before moving into the beauty and personal care industry at Estée Lauder, where she served for around seven years in the business development and strategy departments. From 1999 to 2003, Boswell served in executive positions at the Ford Motor Company. She then transitioned to Avon Products until 2008.

In 2008, Boswell was named president of global brands at Alberto-Culver. Following Unilever's acquisition of Alberto-Culver, Boswell joined Unilever's senior leadership team. She was named president of customer development for Unilever's United States operations in 2017. She left the company in 2019.

=== Bath & Body Works ===
In December 2022, Boswell assumed the role of Bath & Body Works chief executive. She succeeded interim chief executive Sarah Nash. During her tenure, Boswell oversaw product development, customer engagement, and brand partnerships.

Boswell departed from her position as CEO of Bath & Body Works in May 2025. She was succeeded by Daniel Heaf. At the same time, she also left the company's board of directors.

== Board memberships ==
Boswell has served on the boards of publicly traded companies such as ManpowerGroup, Wolverine World Wide, and ACCO Brands. In May 2025, The Clorox Company announced her election to its board of directors.

== Awards and recognition ==
Boswell was named Achiever of the Year by Cosmetic Executive Women in 2011. In 2005, she was named a Henry Crown Fellow of the Aspen Institute.

The next year, she was recognized as a "Woman to Watch" by Advertising Age and as "Marketer of the Year" by Women's Wear Daily. She was also included among Women's Wear Daily's "50 Most Influential People in Beauty" and recognized as a "Top 50 Brand Innovator" by Cosmetic Executive Women.

In 2017, Boswell received the "Directors to Watch" recognition from Directors & Boards, followed by the "Most Influential Corporate Directors" recognition from Women Inc. in 2018. In 2022, she received the Yale Medal for her service to the university. In 2023, Women's Wear Daily named Boswell to its list of the "25 Most Inspirational Women Leaders".
