= List of Fortune 500 computer software and information companies =

This is a list of software and information technology companies that are in the Fortune 500 list of the largest U.S. companies by revenue in the year of 2024.

Company	Type	2020 ranking
Microsoft	Computer Software	13
Oracle	Computer Software	89
Salesforce	Computer Software	123
Adobe	Computer Software	210
Intuit	Computer Software	297
ServiceNow	Computer Software	432
Workday	Computer Software	490
Apple	Computers, Office Equipment	3
Dell Technologies	Computers, Office Equipment	48
HP	Computers, Office Equipment	82
Hewlett Packard Enterprise	Computers, Office Equipment	147
Western Digital	Computers, Office Equipment	334
Super Micro Computer	Computers, Office Equipment	498
Nvidia	Semiconductors and Other Electronic Components	65
Intel	Semiconductors and Other Electronic Components	79
Qualcomm	Semiconductors and Other Electronic Components	117
Broadcom	Semiconductors and Other Electronic Components	118
Jabil	Semiconductors and Other Electronic Components	125
Micron Technology	Semiconductors and Other Electronic Components	134
Applied Materials	Semiconductors and Other Electronic Components	158
Advanced Micro Devices	Semiconductors and Other Electronic Components	181
Texas Instruments	Semiconductors and Other Electronic Components	234
Lam Research	Semiconductors and Other Electronic Components	237
Micron Technology	Semiconductors and Other Electronic Components	264
Analog Devices	Semiconductors and Other Electronic Components	335
KLA	Semiconductors and Other Electronic Components	382
Sanmina	Semiconductors and Other Electronic Components	433
Microchip Technology	Semiconductors and Other Electronic Components	447
ON Semiconductor	Semiconductors and Other Electronic Components	452
Cisco Systems	Network and Other Communications Equipment	74
Amphenol	Network and Other Communications Equipment	325
Motorola Solutions	Network and Other Communications Equipment	395
IBM	Information Technology Services	63
CDW	Information Technology Services	189
Cognizant Technology Solutions	Information Technology Services	213
Kyndryl Holdings	Information Technology Services	241
Leidos Holdings	Information Technology Services	266
DXC Technology	Information Technology Services	294
Booz Allen Hamilton Holding	Information Technology Services	422
Insight Enterprises	Information Technology Services	427
Science Applications International	Information Technology Services	479
Concentrix	Information Technology Services	499
Amazon	Internet Services and Retailing	2
Alphabet	Internet Services and Retailing	8
Meta Platforms	Internet Services and Retailing	30
Uber Technologies	Internet Services and Retailing	113
Coupang	Internet Services and Retailing	168
Booking Holdings	Internet Services and Retailing	190
Expedia Group	Internet Services and Retailing	315
Wayfair	Internet Services and Retailing	346
Chewy	Internet Services and Retailing	362
Qurate Retail	Internet Services and Retailing	370
eBay	Internet Services and Retailing	390
Airbnb	Internet Services and Retailing	396
DoorDash	Internet Services and Retailing	443
