= Rodney O. Martin Jr. =

American business executive (born 1952)

- Born: June 16, 1952 (age 74); Portland, Maine, United States
- Other name: Rod
- Education: Alfred University (B.A.)
- Occupation: Business executive
- Known for: Voya Financial

Rodney O. "Rod" Martin Jr. (born June 16, 1952) is an American business executive. He was the chairman and chief executive officer of Voya Financial, Inc. (NYSE: VOYA), a Fortune 500 financial services company based in New York, New York from 2011 through December 2022.

== Education ==
Martin graduated with a bachelor's degree in business administration from Alfred University in Alfred, New York.

== Professional career ==
Martin started his career in 1975 as an agent with Connecticut Mutual Life Insurance Company, where he spent more than 20 years, ultimately becoming president of Connecticut Mutual Insurance Services. In 1995, he became president and chief executive officer of the American General Life Insurance Company of New York. When it merged with the American International Group, he was in charge of their life insurance division. During his 10-year tenure at AIG, he was chairman and CEO of American Life Insurance Company (Alico) and chairman of American International Assurance (AIA).

In 2011, Martin joined Voya Financial as chairman and chief executive officer. Under Martin's leadership, Voya has achieved 400 basis points of improvement in Ongoing Business Adjusted Operating Return on Equity; generated strong growth in Ongoing Business operating earnings; returned $3 billion in excess capital to shareholders; and fostered a One Voya culture. Martin successfully prepared the company for an initial public offering (IPO) on the New York Stock Exchange in May 2013 – leading one of the top performing IPOs of that year.

Martin earned a total compensation of $9.59 million in 2016, which included a base salary of $1 million, stock awards worth $6.40 million, and other compensation totaling $2.19 million.

== Honors and organizations ==
Martin is a board member of the American Council of Life Insurers (ACLI); a board member of Junior Achievement; a fellow, Life Underwriter Training Council; and has been on the board of the Life Insurance Marketing and Research Association (LIMRA).

Martin is also a member of Catalyst CEO Champions for Change, the U.S. 30% Club, and the Committee Encouraging Corporate Philanthropy (CECP).
