= Flo (Progressive Insurance) =

Fictional salesperson appearing in a marketing campaign for Progressive Corporation

- Flo, as portrayed by actress Stephanie Courtney
- First appearance: 2008
- Created by: Arnold Worldwide
- Portrayed by: Stephanie Courtney
- Company: Progressive Corporation

In-universe information
- Alias: The Progressive Girl
- Gender: Female
- Occupation: Insurance salesperson
- Nationality: American

Flo is a fictional salesperson appearing in more than 100 advertisements for Progressive Insurance since 2008. Portrayed by actress and comedian Stephanie Courtney, the character has developed a fan base on social networks and has become an iconic advertising mascot.

== Broadcast history ==
The character debuted in 2008 through several television advertisements and has since appeared in radio, print, and web banners. The fictional upbeat store employee of Progressive Corporation was created by copywriter John Park and art director Steve Reepmeyer, at the Boston-based agency Arnold Worldwide. Flo has appeared in more than 100 advertisements.

In 2011, Progressive introduced Flo's Australian counterpart, Kitty, played by Holly Austin. In 2014, other recurring characters were added to the advertisements. Jim Cashman plays Jamie, Flo's sidekick. In 2020, another Progressive employee was added, Mara, portrayed by Natalie Palamides.

== Overview ==
Flo is a cashier and is recognizable by her extremely upbeat personality, brilliant white uniform, makeup, and retro hairstyle. According to Courtney, it takes one hour to prepare Flo's hair and another to apply her make-up. Referring to her work in The Groundlings, she said, "Flo could be one of my improv characters, always on and sort of cracked in a weird way." She thinks that the GEICO gecko "puts out more sexual vibes than Flo does".

In November 2014, Progressive aired its 100th advertisement featuring Flo and introduced other members of her family including her mother, father, brother, sister, and grandfather. All of these characters were also played by Courtney, who was reported to have spent about 12 hours doing hair and makeup transitions for the recording.

== Reception ==
In October 2009, the Boston Herald referred to Flo as "the commercial break's new sweetheart" and said Courtney was "attaining TV ad icon status". The same article also reported that she was the subject of a popular Halloween costume. There are multiple websites and social media groups that are either dedicated to or talking about her. The volume of commercials and the type of humor is off-putting to others, described as "love her or hate her" or "badvertising".

Advertising Age described Flo as "a weirdly sincere, post-modern Josephine the Plumber who just really wants to help. She has; the brand is flourishing." This was later echoed in an article from Duane Dudek in the Milwaukee Journal Sentinel on May 20, 2014, who credits Flo for inspiring a new trend of female commercial pitch people and cementing her legacy alongside Josephine and Palmolive Dishwashing Detergent's Madge the Manicurist.

Flo was added as a downloadable character in the video game ModNation Racers in late 2010, complete with her own Progressive kart.

== See also ==
- Dr. Rick
