= Napoleon Township, Michigan =

- Civil township
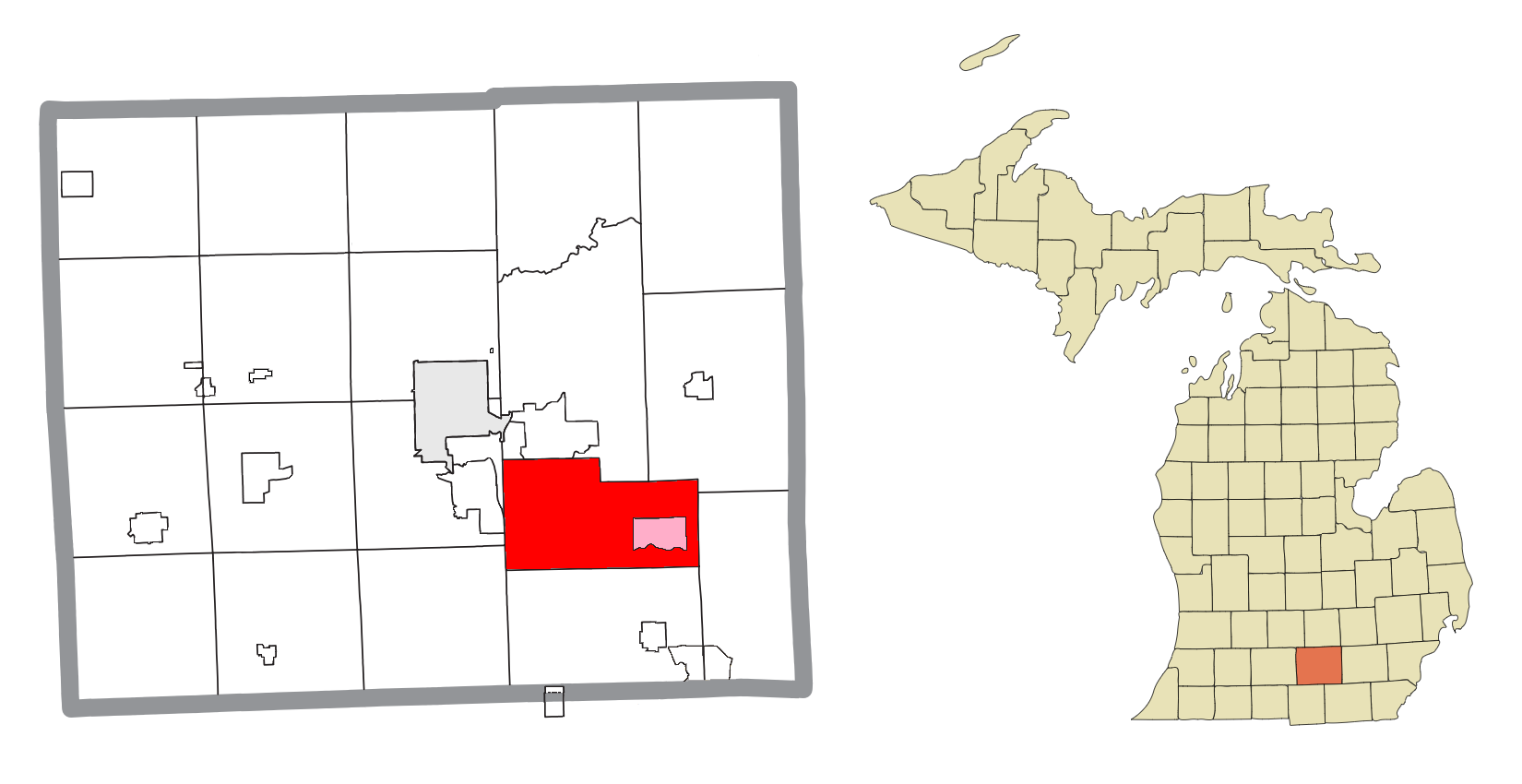
- Location within Jackson County (red) and the administered community of Napoleon (pink)

- Location within the state of Michigan Napoleon Township (the United States)
- Coordinates: 42°10′31″N 84°17′03″W
- Country: United States
- State: Michigan
- County: Jackson

Government
  - Supervisor: Daniel Wymer
  - Clerk: John Hummer

Area
  - Total: 31.41 sq mi (81.4 km^{2})
  - Land: 28.94 sq mi (75.0 km^{2})
  - Water: 2.47 sq mi (6.4 km^{2})
- Elevation: 968 ft (295 m)

Population (2020)
  - Total: 6,789
  - Density: 234.6/sq mi (90.58/km^{2})
- Time zone: UTC-5 (Eastern (EST))
  - Summer (DST): UTC-4 (EDT)
- ZIP code(s): 49201, 49203 (Jackson); 49234 (Clarklake); 49240 (Grass Lake); 49261 (Napoleon)
- Area code: 517
- FIPS code: 26-56640
- GNIS feature ID: 1626789
- Website: Official website

Napoleon Township is a civil township of Jackson County in the U.S. states of Michigan. The population was 6,789 at the 2020 census.

== Communities ==
- Ackerson was a flag station on the C. N. Railroad. It had a post office from December 1898 to February 1899 and again from November 1899 to August 1902.
- Napoleon is an unincorporated community and census-designated place located within the township.

== Geography ==
According to the United States Census Bureau, the township has a total area of 31.41 square miles (81.35 km^{2}), of which 28.94 square miles (74.95 km^{2}) is land and 2.47 square miles (6.40 km^{2}) (7.86%) is water.

The township is southeast of the center of Jackson County. U.S. Route 127 forms part of the western border, and state highway M-50 runs through the center of the township, connecting Napoleon village with Jackson, the county seat, 10 miles (16 km) to the northwest. Most of the township is part of the Grand River watershed flowing to Lake Michigan, except for the southeastern corner, which drains to the River Raisin and eventually Lake Erie.

== Demographics ==
As of the census of 2000, there were 6,962 people, 2,592 households, and 1,938 families residing in the township. The population density was 236.4 inhabitants per square mile (91.3/km^{2}). There were 2,824 housing units at an average density of 95.9 per square mile (37.0/km^{2}). The racial makeup of the township was 96.61% White, 0.86% African American, 0.32% Native American, 0.36% Asian, 0.69% from other races, and 1.16% from two or more races. Hispanic or Latino of any race were 1.55% of the population.

There were 2,592 households, out of which 35.4% had children under the age of 18 living with them, 60.3% were married couples living together, 9.6% had a female householder with no husband present, and 25.2% were non-families. 20.3% of all households were made up of individuals, and 7.0% had someone living alone who was 65 years of age or older. The average household size was 2.66 and the average family size was 3.04.

In the township the population was spread out, with 27.1% under the age of 18, 6.8% from 18 to 24, 29.6% from 25 to 44, 25.4% from 45 to 64, and 11.1% who were 65 years of age or older. The median age was 37 years. For every 100 females, there were 100.1 males. For every 100 females age 18 and over, there were 96.3 males.

The median income for a household in the township was $48,065, and the median income for a family was $51,875. Males had a median income of $40,789 versus $24,972 for females. The per capita income for the township was $22,436. About 3.4% of families and 4.0% of the population were below the poverty line, including 5.5% of those under age 18 and 1.8% of those age 65 or over.
