= Voya Financial =

American financial services company

Voya Financial, Inc.
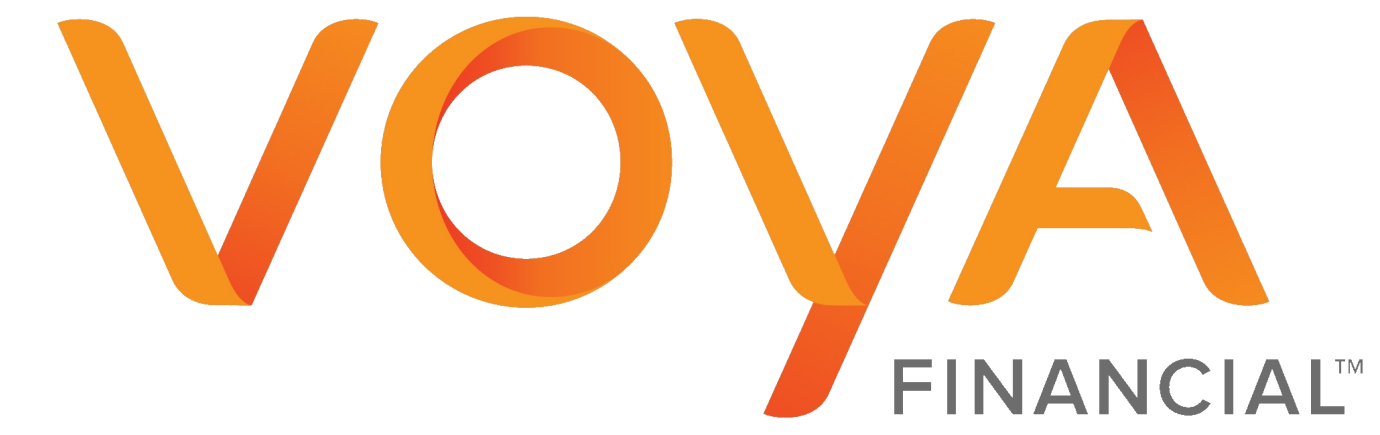

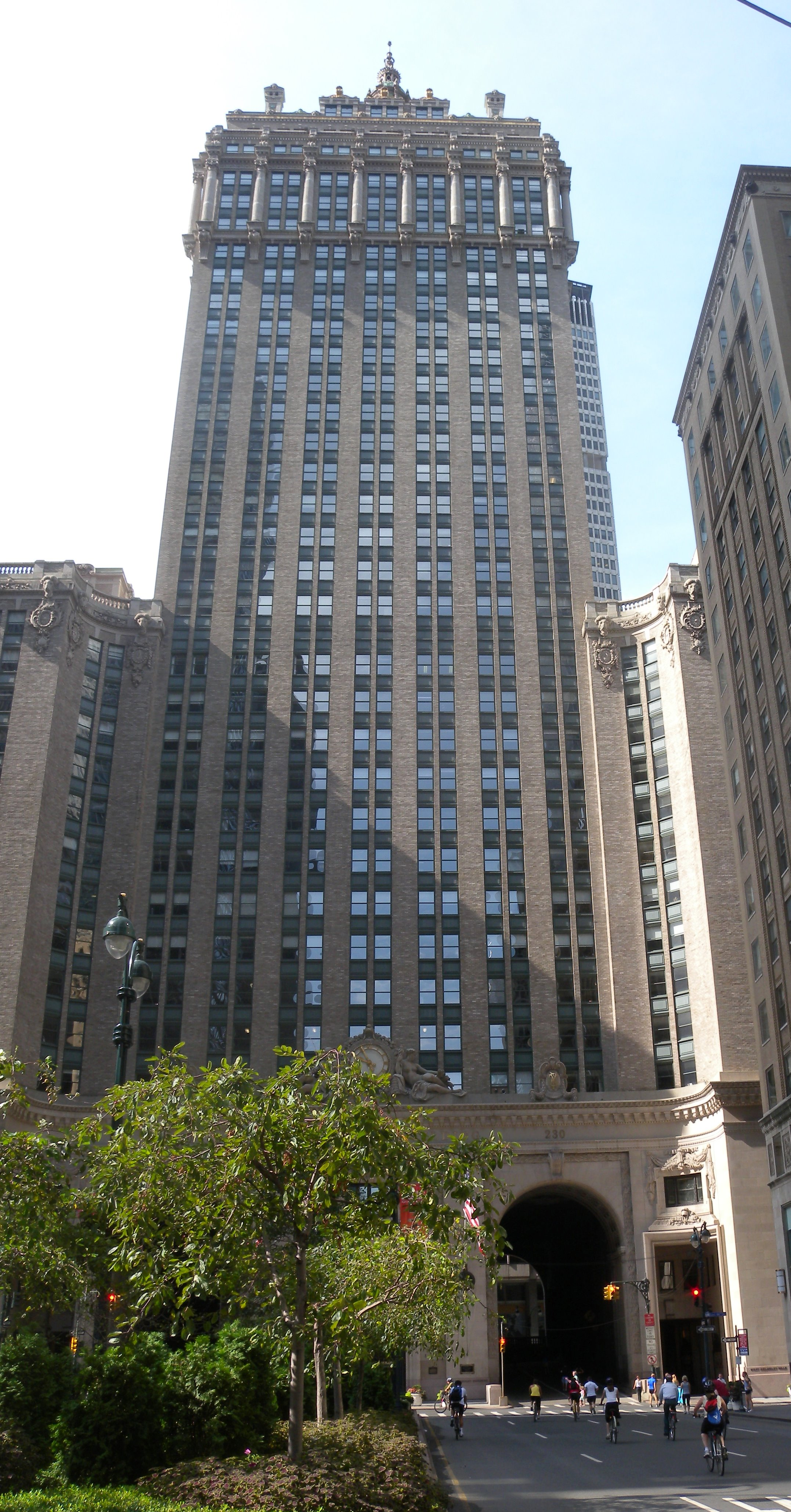
- Headquarters at Helmsley Building
- Type: Public company
- Traded as: NYSE: VOYA; S&P 400 component
- Industry: Financial services
- Predecessor: ING U.S.
- Founded: 1991; 35 years ago (As an ING subsidiary)
- Headquarters: Helmsley Building; New York City, U.S.
- Key people: Heather Lavallee (CEO); Michael S. Smith (CFO)
- Products: Retirement services Insurance; Asset management Employee benefits
- Revenue: ▼US$7.6 billion (2020)
- Operating income: ▲US$495 million (2020)
- Net income: ▲US$-158 million (2020)
- Total assets: ▲US$180 billion (2020)
- Total equity: ▼US$11.3 billion (2020)
- Number of employees: 9,000 (2024)
- Website: voya.com

Voya Financial is an American financial, retirement, investment and insurance company based in New York City. Voya began as ING U.S., the United States operating subsidiary of ING Group, which was spun off in 2013 and established independent financial backing through an initial public offering. In April 2014, the company rebranded itself as Voya Financial. Voya's predecessors had first entered the U.S. market in the 1970s by acquiring companies such as Wisconsin National, Midwestern United, Security Life of Denver, Equitable of Iowa, Furman Selz, Northwestern National/ReliaStar, and CitiStreet.

Voya Financial returned to the Fortune 500 list in 2024, coming in at #487 with $7.3 billion in revenue.

== Operations ==
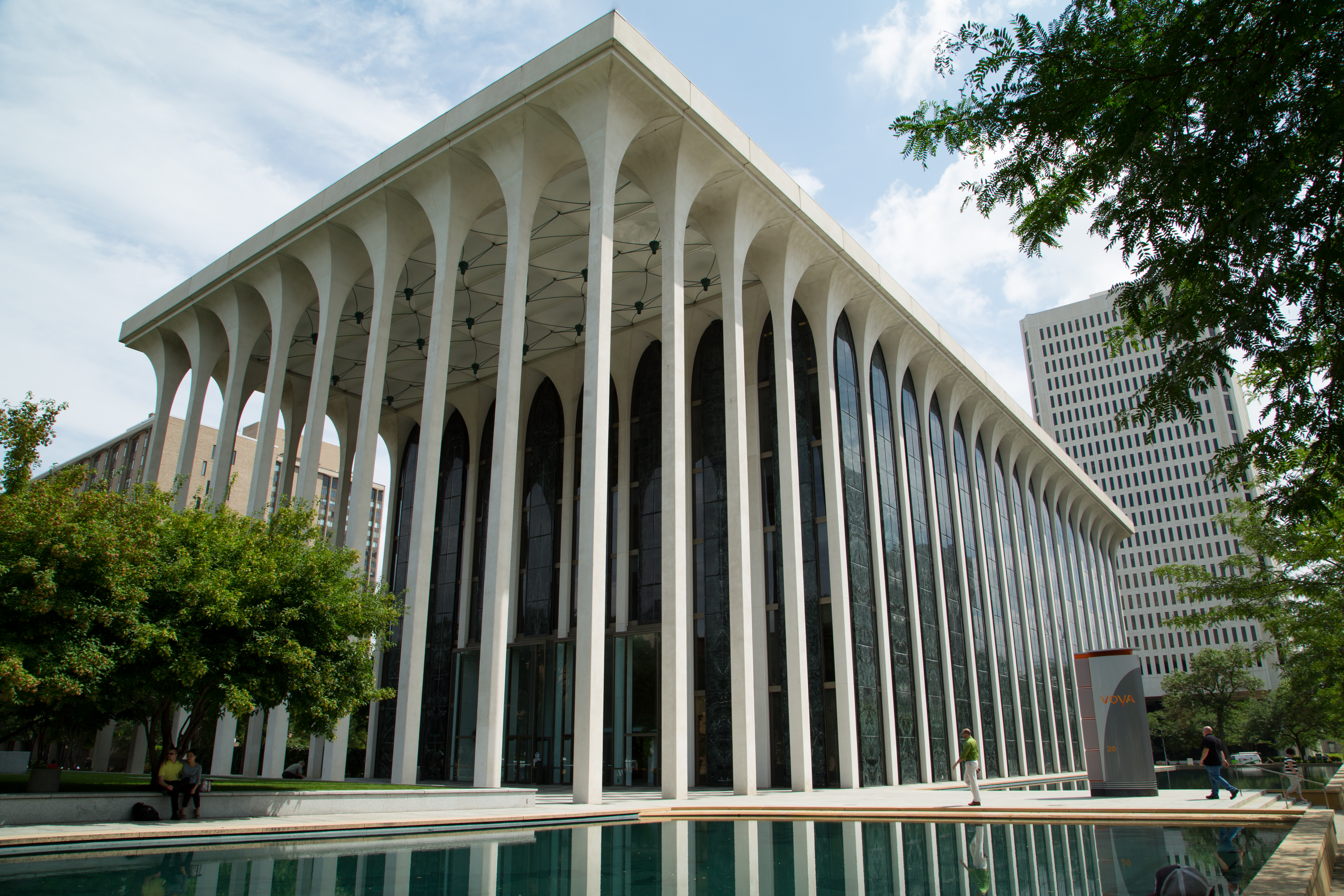
One of three Voya Financial buildings in Minneapolis

The company's main center for broker-dealer (the ING Financial Partners division) and annuities businesses is located in Des Moines, Iowa. This center was first established in 1997 and employed 400 as of late 2014. On July 31, 2017, Voya entered into an agreement with Cognizant to outsource a broad range of IT services, resulting in layoffs and jobs transferred to Cognizant.
