= Fortune 500 =

Annual list of largest US corporations

The July 24, 2006 issue of Fortune, featuring its Fortune 500 list

The Fortune 500 is an annual list compiled and published by Fortune magazine that ranks 500 of the largest United States corporations by total revenue for their respective fiscal years. The list includes publicly held companies, along with privately held companies for which revenues are publicly available. The concept of the Fortune 500 was created by Edgar P. Smith, a Fortune editor, and the first list was published in 1955. The Fortune 500 is more commonly used than its subset Fortune 100 or superset Fortune 1000.

== History ==
The Fortune 500, created by Edgar P. Smith, was first published in January 1955. The original top ten companies were General Motors, Jersey Standard, U.S. Steel, General Electric, Esmark, Anderson-Prichard Oil Corporation, Armour, Gulf Oil, Chrysler, Mobil, and DuPont.

== Methodology ==
The original Fortune 500 was limited to companies whose revenues were derived from manufacturing, mining, and energy exploration. At the same time, Fortune published companion "Fortune 50" lists of the 50 largest commercial banks (ranked by assets), utilities (ranked by assets), life insurance companies (ranked by assets), retailers (ranked by gross revenues) and transportation companies (ranked by revenues). Fortune magazine changed its methodology in 1994 to include service companies. With the change came 291 new entrants to the famous list including three in the Top 10.

== Influence ==
The companies on the 2026 Fortune 500 had combined revenue of $21 trillion and combined profits of $2.1 trillion.

== Overview ==
The following is the list of top 20 companies.

Fortune 500 list of 2026
Rank	Company	State	Industry	Revenue in USD
1	Amazon	Washington	Internet services and retailing	$716.9 billion
2	Walmart	Arkansas	General merchandisers	$713.2 billion
3	UnitedHealth Group	Minnesota	Health care: insurance and managed care	$447.6 billion
4	Apple	California	Computers, office equipment	$416.2 billion
5	McKesson Corporation	Texas	Wholesalers: health care	$403.4 billion
6	Alphabet Inc.	California	Internet services and retailing	$402.8 billion
7	CVS Health	Rhode Island	Health care: pharmacy and other services	$402.1 billion
8	Berkshire Hathaway	Nebraska	Insurance: property and casualty (stock)	$371.4 billion
9	ExxonMobil	Texas	Petroleum refining	$332.2 billion
10	Cencora	Pennsylvania	Wholesalers: health care	$321.3 billion
11	Microsoft	Washington	Computer software	$281.7 billion
12	Costco	Washington	General merchandisers	$275.2 billion
13	Cigna	Connecticut	Health care: pharmacy and other services	$274.9 billion
14	Cardinal Health	Ohio	Wholesalers: health care	$222.6 billion
15	Nvidia	California	Semiconductors and Other Electronic Components	$215.9 billion
16	Meta	California	Internet Services and Retailing	$201.0 billion
17	Elevance Health	Indiana	Health care: insurance and managed care	$199.1 billion
18	Centene	Missouri	Health care: insurance and managed care	$194.8 billion
19	Chevron Corporation	Texas	Petroleum refining	$189.0 billion
20	Ford Motor Company	Michigan	Motor vehicles & parts	$187.3 billion

=== Breakdown by state ===
This is the list of the states with ten or more companies within the Fortune 500 as of 2026.

Breakdown by state
Rank	State	Companies
1	Texas	57
2	California	56
3	New York	53
4	Illinois	29
4	Ohio	29
6	Virginia	24
7	Florida	22
8	Pennsylvania	20
9	Minnesota	17
10	Georgia	16
11	Connecticut	15
11	Massachusetts	15
11	New Jersey	15
14	Michigan	14
15	North Carolina	12
16	Tennessee	11

=== Breakdown by metropolitan area ===
This is the list of the top 10 metropolitan statistical areas with the most companies within the Fortune 500 as of 2026.

Breakdown by metropolitan area
Rank	Metropolitan area	Companies
1	New York City	49
2	Chicago	30
3	Houston	26
4	San Jose, California	21
5	Washington, D.C. (Note: Amazon is co-headquartered between Seattle and Arlington, Virginia, the latter being located in the Washington metropolitan area.)	20
6	Dallas	19
7	Atlanta	15
7	Minneapolis	15
9	Boston	14
9	San Francisco	14

== See also ==
- 40 Under 40
- Fortune Global 500
- Fortune India 500
- Fortune 1000
- List of largest companies in the United States by revenue
- List of largest companies by revenue
- List of Fortune 500 computer software and information companies
- List of S&P 500 companies
- List of women CEOs of Fortune 500 companies
- Forbes Global 2000
- Total Fortune 1000 companies by urban area list
