= 1976 United States House of Representatives elections =

House elections for the 95th U.S. Congress

- November 2, 1976

All 435 seats in the United States House of Representatives 218 seats needed for a majority
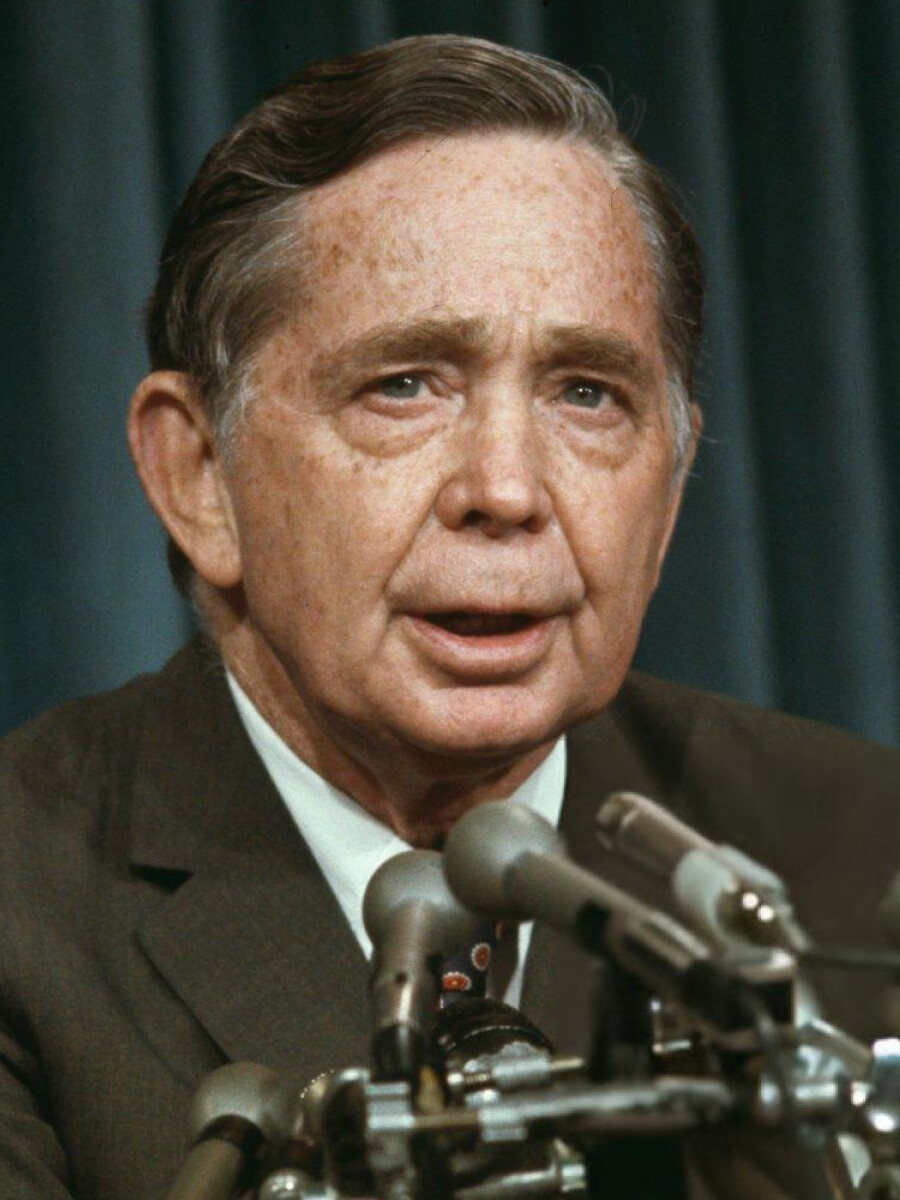

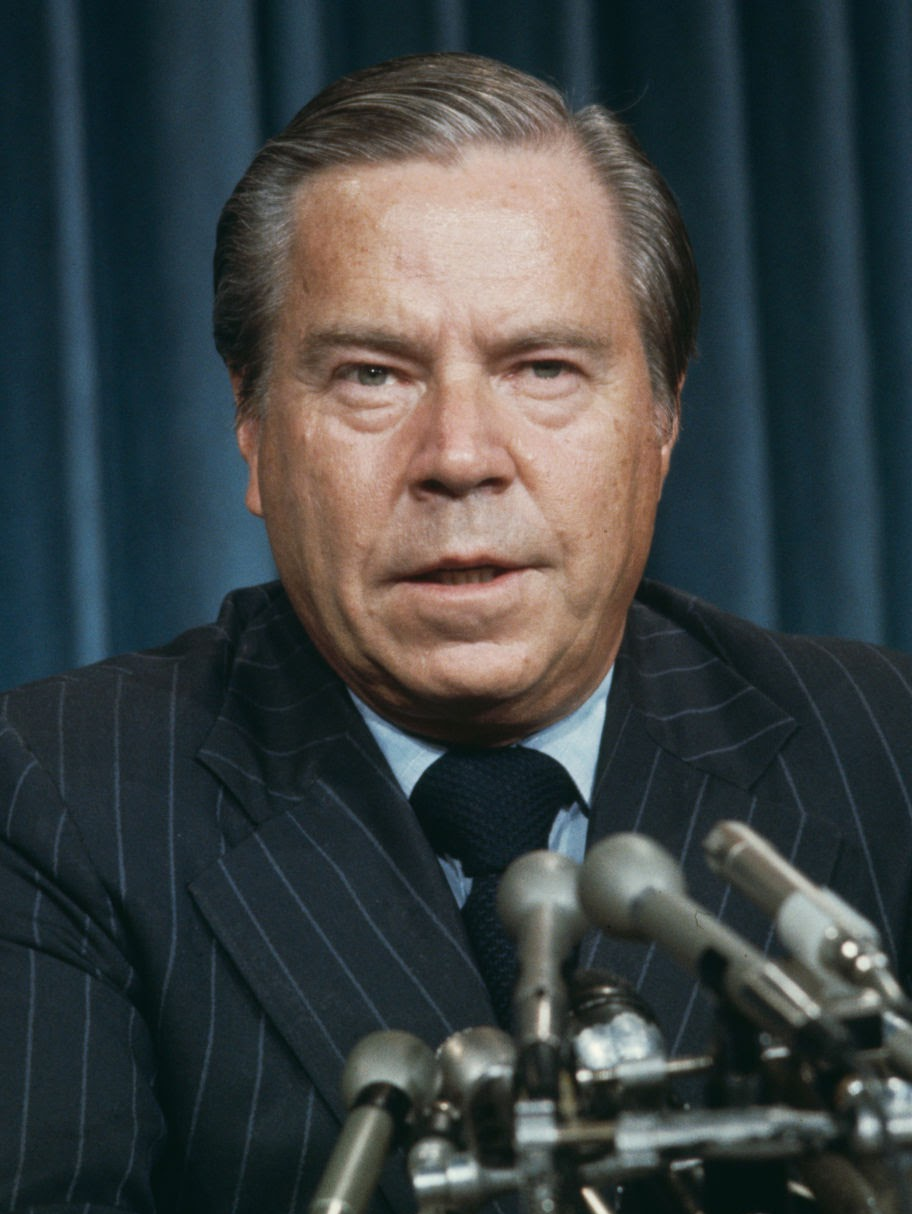
	Majority party	Minority party
Leader	Carl Albert (retired)	John Rhodes
Party	Democratic	Republican
Leader since	January 21, 1971	December 7, 1973
Leader's seat	Oklahoma 3rd	Arizona 1st
Last election	291 seats	144 seats
Seats won	292	143
Seat change	▲1	▼1
Popular vote	41,474,890	31,380,535
Percentage	55.9%	42.3%
Swing	▼1.6pp	▲1.6pp
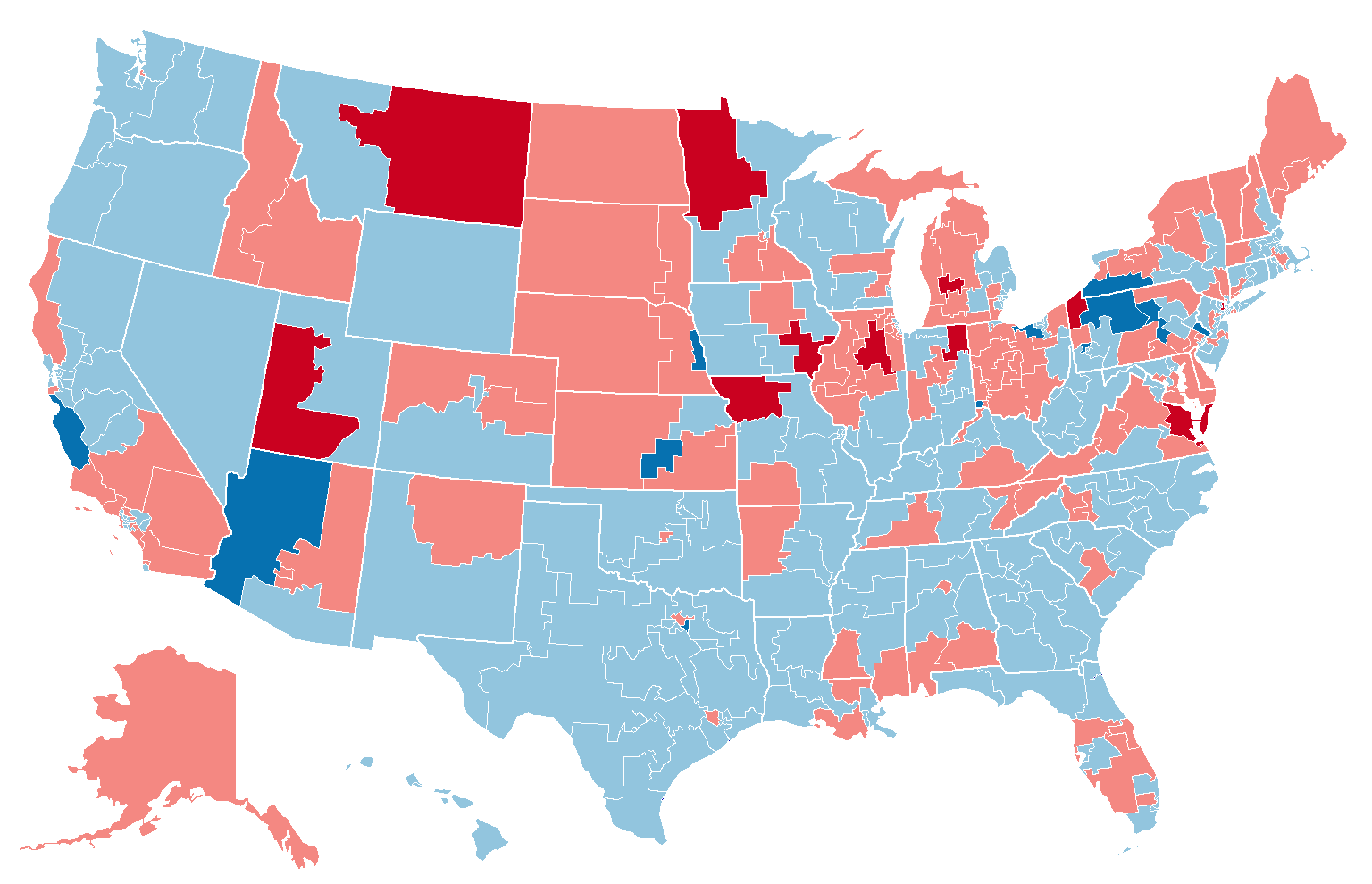
- Results: Democratic hold Democratic gain Republican hold Republican gain
Speaker before election
Carl Albert
Democratic
Elected Speaker
Tip O'Neil
Democratic

The 1976 United States House of Representatives elections were elections for the United States House of Representatives on November 2, 1976, to elect members to serve in the 95th United States Congress. They coincided with Jimmy Carter's election as president. Carter's narrow victory over Gerald Ford had limited coattails, and his Democratic Party gained a net of only one seat from the Republican Party in the House. The result was nevertheless disappointing to the Republicans, who were hoping to win back some of the seats they lost in the wake of the Watergate scandal two years earlier.

As of 2026, this election was the last time any party won at least 290 House seats, or a two-thirds supermajority. It is also the last congressional election in which Democrats won a House seat in Wyoming.

== Overall results ==
383 incumbent members sought reelection, but three were defeated in primaries and 12 defeated in the general election, for a total of 368 incumbents winning.

↓
292	143
Democratic	Republican

Parties	Seats				Popular vote		
Parties	1974	1976	+/-	Strength	Vote	%	Change
Democratic Party	291	292	▲1	67.1%	41,474,890	55.9%	▼1.6%
Republican Party	144	143	▼1	32.9%	31,380,535	42.3%	▲1.6%
Independents	Steady	Steady	Steady	Steady	587,897	0.8%	▲0.1%
American Party	Steady	Steady	Steady	Steady	117,738	0.2%	▼0.3%
Conservative Party	Steady	Steady	Steady	Steady	97,679	0.1%	▼0.1%
American Independent Party	Steady	Steady	Steady	Steady	81,864	0.1%	▲0.1%
Libertarian Party	Steady	Steady	Steady	Steady	71,791	0.1%	▲0.1%
Liberal Party	Steady	Steady	Steady	Steady	42,642	0.1%	Steady
U.S. Labor Party	Steady	Steady	Steady	Steady	37,527	0.1%	Steady
Peace and Freedom Party	Steady	Steady	Steady	Steady	34,738	<0.1%	▼0.1%
Independents for Godly Government Party	Steady	Steady	Steady	Steady	27,268	<0.1%	Steady
Silent Majority Party	Steady	Steady	Steady	Steady	14,543	<0.1%	Steady
Constitution Party	Steady	Steady	Steady	Steady	9,713	<0.1%	Steady
George Wallace Party	Steady	Steady	Steady	Steady	7,726	<0.1%	Steady
Individual Americans Independence Party	Steady	Steady	Steady	Steady	3,979	<0.1%	Steady
Peoples Independent Party	Steady	Steady	Steady	Steady	3,916	<0.1%	Steady
Raza Unida Party	Steady	Steady	Steady	Steady	3,588	<0.1%	Steady
Prohibition Party	Steady	Steady	Steady	Steady	3,141	<0.1%	Steady
Communist Party	Steady	Steady	Steady	Steady	2,947	<0.1%	Steady
Human Rights Party	Steady	Steady	Steady	Steady	2,700	<0.1%	Steady
People's Party	Steady	Steady	Steady	Steady	2,408	<0.1%	Steady
Bring Us Together Party	Steady	Steady	Steady	Steady	1,969	<0.1%	Steady
Politicians Are Crooks Party	Steady	Steady	Steady	Steady	1,814	<0.1%	Steady
Independent Taxpayers Watchdog Party	Steady	Steady	Steady	Steady	1,594	<0.1%	Steady
Pro Life Party	Steady	Steady	Steady	Steady	1,483	<0.1%	Steady
Regular Democracy Party	Steady	Steady	Steady	Steady	1,431	<0.1%	Steady
White Power Party	Steady	Steady	Steady	Steady	1,338	<0.1%	Steady
Mayflower Party	Steady	Steady	Steady	Steady	1,314	<0.1%	Steady
Workers Party	Steady	Steady	Steady	Steady	1,253	<0.1%	Steady
Consumer Action Party	Steady	Steady	Steady	Steady	1,150	<0.1%	Steady
National Democratic Party	Steady	Steady	Steady	Steady	1,021	<0.1%	Steady
Citizens for Haas Party	Steady	Steady	Steady	Steady	743	<0.1%	Steady
Jobs, Equality, Peace Party	Steady	Steady	Steady	Steady	636	<0.1%	Steady
Restoration Party	Steady	Steady	Steady	Steady	499	<0.1%	Steady
Co-Equal Citizens Party	Steady	Steady	Steady	Steady	432	<0.1%	Steady
Independent Conservative Party	Steady	Steady	Steady	Steady	287	<0.1%	Steady
Individual Needs Center Party	Steady	Steady	Steady	Steady	228	<0.1%	Steady
Revolutionary Party	Steady	Steady	Steady	Steady	214	<0.1%	Steady
Others	Steady	Steady	Steady	Steady	231,924	0.3%	▲0.3%
Total	435	435	0	100.0%	74,259,164	100.0%	—

Source: Election Statistics – Office of the Clerk

Popular vote
Democratic	55.85%
Republican	42.26%
Others	1.89%

House seats
Democratic	67.13%
Republican	32.87%

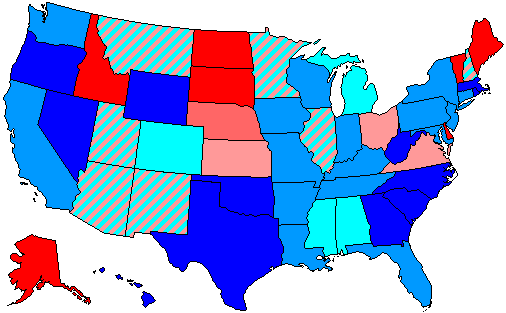
House seats by party holding plurality in state: 80+% Democratic / 80+% Republican; 60+ to 80% Democratic / 60+ to 80% Republican; Up to 60% Democratic / Up to 60% Republican

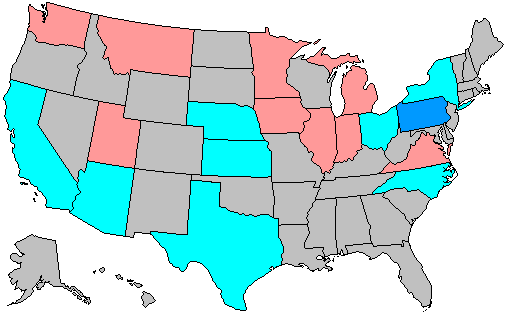
6+ Democratic gain / 6+ Republican gain; 3–5 Democratic gain / 3–5 Republican gain; 1–2 Democratic gain / 1–2 Republican gain; No net change

== Special elections ==
District	Incumbent			This race	
District	Member	Party	First elected	Results	Candidates
New York 39	James F. Hastings	Republican	1968	Incumbent resigned January 20, 1976 to become president of Associated Industries of New York State. New member elected March 2, 1976. Democratic gain.	✓ Stan Lundine (Democratic) 61.2%; John T. Calkins (Republican) 38.8%
Texas 22	Robert R. Casey	Democratic	1958	Incumbent resigned January 22, 1976, to become commissioner to the United States Maritime Commission. New member elected April 3, 1976. Republican gain. Winner subsequently lost re-election in November, see below.	✓ Ron Paul (Republican) 56.2%; Robert Gammage (Democratic) 43.9%
Texas 1	Wright Patman	Democratic	1928	Incumbent died March 7, 1976. New member elected June 19, 1976. Democratic hold.	✓ Sam B. Hall Jr. (Democratic) 72.2%; Glen Jones (Democratic) 22.0%; James Hogan (Republican) 4.9%; Fred Hudson (Democratic) 0.9%
Missouri 6	Jerry Litton	Democratic	1972	Incumbent died August 3, 1976. New member elected November 2, 1976. Republican gain. Winner was also elected to the next term, see below.	✓ Tom Coleman (Republican) 60.9%; Morgan Maxfield (Democratic) 39.1%
Massachusetts 7	Torbert Macdonald	Democratic	1954	Incumbent died May 21, 1976. New member elected November 2, 1976. Democratic hold. Winner was also elected to the next term, see below.	✓ Ed Markey (Democratic) 77.0%; Richard Daly (Republican) 17.6%; James J. Murphy (Independent) 3.3%; Harry G. Chickles (Independent) 2.3%
Pennsylvania 1	William A. Barrett	Democratic	1944; 1946 (Lost); 1948	Incumbent died April 12, 1976. New member elected November 2, 1976. Democratic hold.	✓ Michael Myers (Democratic) 74.4%; Samuel N. Fanelli (Republican) 25.6%

== Alabama ==
District	Incumbent			This race	
District	Member	Party	First elected	Results	Candidates
Alabama 1	Jack Edwards	Republican	1964	Incumbent re-elected.	✓ Jack Edwards (Republican) 62.5%; Bill Davenport (Democratic) 37.5%
Alabama 2	William Louis Dickinson	Republican	1964	Incumbent re-elected.	✓ William Louis Dickinson (Republican) 57.6%; J. Carole Keahey (Democratic) 42.4%
Alabama 3	Bill Nichols	Democratic	1966	Incumbent re-elected.	✓ Bill Nichols (Democratic) 99.0%; Ogburn Gardner (Proh) 1.0%
Alabama 4	Tom Bevill	Democratic	1966	Incumbent re-elected.	✓ Tom Bevill (Democratic) 80.4%; Leonard Wilson (Republican) 19.6%
Alabama 5	Robert E. Jones Jr.	Democratic	1947 (Special)	Incumbent retired. Democratic hold.	✓ Ronnie Flippo (Democratic); Unopposed
Alabama 6	John Hall Buchanan Jr.	Republican	1964	Incumbent re-elected.	✓ John Hall Buchanan Jr. (Republican) 56.7%; Mel Bailey (Democratic) 42.7%; Billy E. Dorsey (Nat Dem) 0.6%
Alabama 7	Walter Flowers	Democratic	1968	Incumbent re-elected.	✓ Walter Flowers (Democratic); Unopposed

== Alaska ==
District	Incumbent			This race	
District	Member	Party	First elected	Results	Candidates
Alaska at-large	Don Young	Republican	1973 (Special)	Incumbent re-elected.	✓ Don Young (Republican) 71.0%; Eben Hopson (Democratic) 29.0%

== Arizona ==
District	Incumbent			This race	
District	Member	Party	First elected	Results	Candidates
Arizona 1	John Jacob Rhodes	Republican	1952	Incumbent re-elected.	✓ John Jacob Rhodes (Republican) 57.3%; Pat Fullinwider (Democratic) 40.7%; Sumner Duncan Dodge (Libertarian) 1.4%; Harry Braun (Independent) 0.6%
Arizona 2	Mo Udall	Democratic	1961 (Special)	Incumbent re-elected.	✓ Mo Udall (Democratic) 58.2%; Laird Guttersen (Republican) 39.4%; Michael Emerling (Libertarian) 2.4%
Arizona 3	Sam Steiger	Republican	1966	Incumbent retired to run for U.S. senator. Democratic gain.	✓ Bob Stump (Democratic) 47.5%; Fred Koory Jr. (Republican) 42.3%; Bill McCune (Independent) 10.2%
Arizona 4	John Bertrand Conlan	Republican	1972	Incumbent retired to run for U.S. senator. Republican hold.	✓ Eldon Rudd (Republican) 48.6%; Tony Mason (Democratic) 48.2%; Pat Harper (Libertarian) 3.1%

== Arkansas ==
District	Incumbent			This race	
District	Member	Party	First elected	Results	Candidates
Arkansas 1	William Vollie Alexander Jr.	Democratic	1968	Incumbent re-elected.	✓ William Vollie Alexander Jr. (Democratic) 68.9%; Harlan Holleman (Republican) 31.1%
Arkansas 2	Wilbur Mills	Democratic	1938	Incumbent retired. Democratic hold.	✓ Jim Guy Tucker (Democratic) 86.4%; James J. Kelly (Republican) 13.6%; Joe McNew (Write-in) 0.005%
Arkansas 3	John Paul Hammerschmidt	Republican	1966	Incumbent re-elected.	✓ John Paul Hammerschmidt (Republican); Unopposed
Arkansas 4	Ray Thornton	Democratic	1972	Incumbent re-elected.	✓ Ray Thornton (Democratic); Unopposed

== California ==
District	Incumbent			This race	
District	Member	Party	First elected	Results	Candidates
California 1	Harold T. Johnson	Democratic	1958	Incumbent re-elected.	✓ Harold T. Johnson (Democratic) 73.9%; James E. Taylor (Republican) 26.1%
California 2	Donald H. Clausen	Republican	1963	Incumbent re-elected.	✓ Donald H. Clausen (Republican) 56.0%; Oscar Klee (Democratic) 41.0%; Robert B. "Bob" Allred (Peace and Freedom) 3.0%
California 3	John E. Moss	Democratic	1952	Incumbent re-elected.	✓ John E. Moss (Democratic) 72.9%; George R. Marsh Jr. (Republican) 27.1%
California 4	Robert L. Leggett	Democratic	1962	Incumbent re-elected.	✓ Robert L. Leggett (Democratic) 50.2%; Albert Dehr (Republican) 49.8%
California 5	John L. Burton	Democratic	1974	Incumbent re-elected.	✓ John L. Burton (Democratic) 61.8%; Branwell Fanning (Republican) 38.2%
California 6	Phillip Burton	Democratic	1964	Incumbent re-elected.	✓ Phillip Burton (Democratic) 66.1%; Tom Spinosa (Republican) 27.0%; Emily L. Siegel (Peace and Freedom) 5.0%; Raymond O. "Ray" Heaps (American Independent) 1.9%
California 7	George Miller	Democratic	1974	Incumbent re-elected.	✓ George Miller (Democratic) 74.7%; Robert L. Vickers (Republican) 23.3%; Melvin E. Stanley (American Independent) 2.0%
California 8	Ron Dellums	Democratic	1970	Incumbent re-elected.	✓ Ron Dellums (Democratic) 62.1%; Philip Stiles Breck Jr. (Republican) 34.7%; Robert J. Evans (Peace and Freedom) 3.2%
California 9	Pete Stark	Democratic	1972	Incumbent re-elected.	✓ Pete Stark (Democratic) 70.8%; James K. Mills (Republican) 27.1%; Albert L. Sargis (Peace and Freedom) 2.1%
California 10	Don Edwards	Democratic	1962	Incumbent re-elected.	✓ Don Edwards (Democratic) 72.0%; Herb Smith (Republican) 24.5%; Edmon V. Kaiser (American Independent) 3.5%
California 11	Leo Ryan	Democratic	1972	Incumbent re-elected.	✓ Leo Ryan (Democratic) 61.1%; Bob Jones (Republican) 35.4%; Nicholas W. Kudrovzeff (American Independent) 3.5%
California 12	Pete McCloskey	Republican	1967	Incumbent re-elected.	✓ Pete McCloskey (Republican) 66.2%; David Harris (Democratic) 31.3%; Joseph David "Joss" Cooney (American Independent) 2.5%
California 13	Norman Mineta	Democratic	1974	Incumbent re-elected.	✓ Norman Mineta (Democratic) 66.8%; Ernie Konnyu (Republican) 31.2%; William Pollock Herrell (American Independent) 2.1%
California 14	John J. McFall	Democratic	1956	Incumbent re-elected.	✓ John J. McFall (Democratic) 72.5%; Roger A. Blain (Republican) 27.5%
California 15	B. F. Sisk	Democratic	1954	Incumbent re-elected.	✓ B. F. Sisk (Democratic) 72.2%; Carol O. Harner (Republican) 27.8%
California 16	Burt L. Talcott	Republican	1962	Lost re-election Democratic gain.	✓ Leon Panetta (Democratic) 53.4%; Burt L. Talcott (Republican) 46.6%
California 17	John Hans Krebs	Democratic	1974	Incumbent re-elected.	✓ John Hans Krebs (Democratic) 65.7%; Henry J. Andreas (Republican) 34.3%
California 18	William M. Ketchum	Republican	1972	Incumbent re-elected.	✓ William M. Ketchum (Republican) 64.2%; Dean Close (Democratic) 35.8%
California 19	Robert J. Lagomarsino	Republican	1974	Incumbent re-elected.	✓ Robert J. Lagomarsino (Republican) 64.4%; Dan Sisson (Democratic) 35.6%
California 20	Barry Goldwater Jr.	Republican	1969	Incumbent re-elected.	✓ Barry Goldwater Jr. (Republican) 67.2%; Patti Lear Corman (Democratic) 32.8%
California 21	James C. Corman	Democratic	1960	Incumbent re-elected.	✓ James C. Corman (Democratic) 66.5%; Erwin "Ed" Hogan (Republican) 28.8%; Bill Hill (Peace and Freedom) 4.7%
California 22	Carlos Moorhead	Republican	1972	Incumbent re-elected.	✓ Carlos Moorhead (Republican) 62.6%; Robert L. Salley (Democratic) 37.4%
California 23	Thomas M. Rees	Democratic	1965	Incumbent retired. Democratic hold.	✓ Anthony Beilenson (Democratic) 60.2%; Thomas F. Bartman (Republican) 39.8%
California 24	Henry Waxman	Democratic	1974	Incumbent re-elected.	✓ Henry Waxman (Democratic) 67.8%; David Irving Simmons (Republican) 32.2%
California 25	Edward R. Roybal	Democratic	1962	Incumbent re-elected.	✓ Edward R. Roybal (Democratic) 71.9%; Jim Madrid (Republican) 22.0%; Marilyn Seals (Peace and Freedom) 6.1%
California 26	John H. Rousselot	Republican	1960; 1962 (defeated); 1970 (Special)	Incumbent re-elected.	✓ John H. Rousselot (Republican) 65.6%; Bruce Latta (Democratic) 34.4%
California 27	Alphonzo E. Bell Jr.	Republican	1960	Incumbent retired to run for U.S. senator. Republican hold.	✓ Bob Dornan (Republican) 54.7%; Gary Familian (Democratic) 45.3%
California 28	Yvonne Brathwaite Burke	Democratic	1972	Incumbent re-elected.	✓ Yvonne Brathwaite Burke (Democratic) 80.2%; Edward S. Skinner (Republican) 19.8%
California 29	Augustus Hawkins	Democratic	1962	Incumbent re-elected.	✓ Augustus Hawkins (Democratic) 85.4%; Michael D. Germonprez (Republican) 11.2%; Sheila Leburg (Independent) 3.3%
California 30	George E. Danielson	Democratic	1970	Incumbent re-elected.	✓ George E. Danielson (Democratic) 74.4%; Harry Couch (Republican) 25.6%
California 31	Charles H. Wilson	Democratic	1962	Incumbent re-elected.	✓ Charles H. Wilson (Democratic); Unopposed
California 32	Glenn M. Anderson	Democratic	1968	Incumbent re-elected.	✓ Glenn M. Anderson (Democratic) 72.2%; Clifford O. Young (Republican) 27.8%
California 33	Del M. Clawson	Republican	1963	Incumbent re-elected.	✓ Del M. Clawson (Republican) 55.1%; Ted Snyder (Democratic) 44.9%
California 34	Mark W. Hannaford	Democratic	1974	Incumbent re-elected.	✓ Mark W. Hannaford (Democratic) 50.7%; Dan Lungren (Republican) 49.3%
California 35	James F. Lloyd	Democratic	1974	Incumbent re-elected.	✓ James F. Lloyd (Democratic) 53.3%; Louis Brutocao (Republican) 46.7%
California 36	George Brown Jr.	Democratic	1962; 1970 (Retired); 1972	Incumbent re-elected.	✓ George Brown Jr. (Democratic) 61.6%; Grant Carner (Republican) 33.5%; William Emery Pasley (American Independent) 5.0%
California 37	Shirley Neil Pettis	Republican	1975	Incumbent re-elected.	✓ Shirley Neil Pettis (Republican) 71.1%; Douglas C. Nilson Jr. (Democratic) 26.1%; Bernard Wahl (American Independent) 2.8%
California 38	Jerry M. Patterson	Democratic	1974	Incumbent re-elected.	✓ Jerry M. Patterson (Democratic) 63.6%; James "Jim" Combs (Republican) 36.4%
California 39	Charles E. Wiggins	Republican	1966	Incumbent re-elected.	✓ Charles E. Wiggins (Republican) 58.6%; William E. "Bill" Farris (Democratic) 41.4%
California 40	Andrew J. Hinshaw	Republican	1972	Lost renomination Republican hold.	✓ Robert Badham (Republican) 59.3%; Vivian Hall (Democratic) 40.7%
California 41	Bob Wilson	Republican	1952	Incumbent re-elected.	✓ Bob Wilson (Republican) 57.7%; King Golden Jr. (Democratic) 42.3%
California 42	Lionel Van Deerlin	Democratic	1962	Incumbent re-elected.	✓ Lionel Van Deerlin (Democratic) 76.0%; Wes Marden (Republican) 24.0%
California 43	Clair Burgener	Republican	1972	Incumbent re-elected.	✓ Clair Burgener (Republican) 65.0%; Pat Kelly (Democratic) 35.0%

== Colorado ==
District	Incumbent			This race	
District	Member	Party	First elected	Results	Candidates
Colorado 1	Pat Schroeder	Democratic	1972	Incumbent re-elected.	✓ Pat Schroeder (Democratic) 53.2%; Don Friedman (Republican) 46.2%; Priscilla Schenk (Socialist Workers) 0.4%; Lann Meyers (Labor) 0.3%
Colorado 2	Tim Wirth	Democratic	1974	Incumbent re-elected.	✓ Tim Wirth (Democratic) 50.5%; Ed Scott (Republican) 49.5%
Colorado 3	Frank Evans	Democratic	1964	Incumbent re-elected.	✓ Frank Evans (Democratic) 51.0%; Melvin H. Takaki (Republican) 47.0%; Alfredo Archer (La Raza Unida) 1.4%; Henry John Olshaw (American) 0.7%
Colorado 4	James Paul Johnson	Republican	1972	Incumbent re-elected.	✓ James Paul Johnson (Republican) 54.0%; Daniel M. Ogden Jr. (Democratic) 34.8%; Dick Davis (Independent) 9.2%; Henry Thiel Jr. (Independent) 1.9%
Colorado 5	William L. Armstrong	Republican	1972	Incumbent re-elected.	✓ William L. Armstrong (Republican) 66.4%; Dorothy Hores (Democratic) 33.6%

== Connecticut ==
District	Incumbent			This race	
District	Member	Party	First elected	Results	Candidates
Connecticut 1	William R. Cotter	Democratic	1970	Incumbent re-elected.	✓ William R. Cotter (Democratic) 57.1%; Lucien P. Di Fazio Jr. (Republican) 41.8%; Charlie A. Burke (George Wallace) 0.6%; Donna C. McDonough (Labor) 0.5%
Connecticut 2	Chris Dodd	Democratic	1974	Incumbent re-elected.	✓ Chris Dodd (Democratic) 65.1%; Richard M. Jackson (Republican) 34.1%; Anthony Discepolo (Independent) 0.8%
Connecticut 3	Robert Giaimo	Democratic	1958	Incumbent re-elected.	✓ Robert Giaimo (Democratic) 54.4%; John G. Pucciano (Republican) 43.7%; Joelle R. Fishman (C) 1.3%; Robert G. Cossette (George Wallace) 0.6%
Connecticut 4	Stewart McKinney	Republican	1970	Incumbent re-elected.	✓ Stewart McKinney (Republican) 61.0%; Geoffrey G. Peterson (Democratic) 37.1%; Richard H. G. Cunningham (George Wallace) 1.6%; Zoltan Toth Solymossy (Conservative) 0.3%
Connecticut 5	Ronald A. Sarasin	Republican	1972	Incumbent re-elected.	✓ Ronald A. Sarasin (Republican) 66.5%; Michael J. Adanti (Democratic) 32.7%; William Kozak Jr. (George Wallace) 0.7%
Connecticut 6	Toby Moffett	Democratic	1974	Incumbent re-elected.	✓ Toby Moffett (Democratic) 56.6%; Thomas F. Upson (Republican) 43.0%; Louis J. Marietta (Independent) 0.4%

== Delaware ==
District	Incumbent			This race	
District	Member	Party	First elected	Results	Candidates
Delaware at-large	Pete du Pont	Republican	1970	Incumbent retired to run for governor of Delaware. Republican hold.	✓ Thomas B. Evans Jr. (Republican) 51.4%; Samuel L. Shipley (Democratic) 47.6%; Robert G. LoPresti (American) 0.4%; Raymond R. Green (Proh) 0.3%; Joseph B. Hollon Sr. (Soc-Lab) 0.2%; Philip Valenti (Labor) 0.07%

== Florida ==
District	Incumbent			This race	
District	Member	Party	First elected	Results	Candidates
Florida 1	Bob Sikes	Democratic	1940; 1944 (resigned); 1944	Incumbent re-elected.	✓ Bob Sikes (Democratic); Unopposed
Florida 2	Don Fuqua	Democratic	1962	Incumbent re-elected.	✓ Don Fuqua (Democratic); Unopposed
Florida 3	Charles E. Bennett	Democratic	1948	Incumbent re-elected.	✓ Charles E. Bennett (Democratic); Unopposed
Florida 4	Bill Chappell	Democratic	1968	Incumbent re-elected.	✓ Bill Chappell (Democratic); Unopposed
Florida 5	Richard Kelly	Republican	1974	Incumbent re-elected.	✓ Richard Kelly (Republican) 59.0%; JoAnn Saunders (Democratic) 41.0%
Florida 6	Bill Young	Republican	1970	Incumbent re-elected.	✓ Bill Young (Republican) 65.2%; Gabriel Cazares (Democratic) 34.8%; Wally Staff (Write-in) 0.01%
Florida 7	Sam Gibbons	Democratic	1962	Incumbent re-elected.	✓ Sam Gibbons (Democratic) 65.7%; Dusty Owens (Republican) 34.3%
Florida 8	James A. Haley	Democratic	1952	Incumbent retired. Democratic hold.	✓ Andy Ireland (Democratic) 58.0%; Bob Johnson (Republican) 42.0%
Florida 9	Louis Frey Jr.	Republican	1968	Incumbent re-elected.	✓ Louis Frey Jr. (Republican) 78.1%; Joseph A. Rosier (Democratic) 21.9%
Florida 10	Skip Bafalis	Republican	1972	Incumbent re-elected.	✓ Skip Bafalis (Republican) 66.3%; Bill Sikes (Democratic) 33.7%
Florida 11	Paul Rogers	Democratic	1954	Incumbent re-elected.	✓ Paul Rogers (Democratic) 91.1%; Clyde Adams (American) 8.9%
Florida 12	J. Herbert Burke	Republican	1966	Incumbent re-elected.	✓ J. Herbert Burke (Republican) 53.9%; Charles Friedman (Democratic) 46.1%; Bob Davis (Write-in) 0.03%
Florida 13	William Lehman	Democratic	1972	Incumbent re-elected.	✓ William Lehman (Democratic) 78.3%; Lee Arnold Spiegelman (Republican) 21.7%
Florida 14	Claude Pepper	Democratic	1962	Incumbent re-elected.	✓ Claude Pepper (Democratic) 72.9%; Evelio S. Estrella (Republican) 27.1%
Florida 15	Dante Fascell	Democratic	1954	Incumbent re-elected.	✓ Dante Fascell (Democratic) 70.4%; Paul R. Cobb (Republican) 29.6%

== Georgia ==
District	Incumbent			This race	
District	Member	Party	First elected	Results	Candidates
Georgia 1	Ronald "Bo" Ginn	Democratic	1972	Incumbent re-elected.	✓ Ronald "Bo" Ginn (Democratic); Unopposed
Georgia 2	Dawson Mathis	Democratic	1970	Incumbent re-elected.	✓ Dawson Mathis (Democratic); Unopposed
Georgia 3	Jack Brinkley	Democratic	1966	Incumbent re-elected.	✓ Jack Brinkley (Democratic) 88.7%; Steven Dugan (Republican) 11.3%
Georgia 4	Elliott H. Levitas	Democratic	1974	Incumbent re-elected.	✓ Elliott H. Levitas (Democratic) 68.3%; George T. Warren II (Republican) 31.7%
Georgia 5	Andrew Young	Democratic	1972	Incumbent re-elected.	✓ Andrew Young (Democratic) 66.7%; Edward W. Gadrix (Republican) 33.3%
Georgia 6	John Flynt	Democratic	1954	Incumbent re-elected.	✓ John Flynt (Democratic) 51.7%; Newt Gingrich (Republican) 48.3%
Georgia 7	Larry McDonald	Democratic	1974	Incumbent re-elected.	✓ Larry McDonald (Democratic) 55.1%; Quincy Collins (Republican) 44.9%
Georgia 8	W. S. Stuckey Jr.	Democratic	1966	Incumbent retired. Democratic hold.	✓ Billy Lee Evans (Democratic) 69.6%; Billy Adams (Republican) 30.4%
Georgia 9	Phillip M. Landrum	Democratic	1952	Incumbent retired. Democratic hold.	✓ Ed Jenkins (Democratic) 79.1%; Louise Wofford (Republican) 20.9%
Georgia 10	Robert Grier Stephens Jr.	Democratic	1960	Incumbent retired. Democratic hold.	✓ Doug Barnard Jr. (Democratic); Unopposed

== Hawaii ==
District	Incumbent			This race	
District	Member	Party	First elected	Results	Candidates
Hawaii 1	Spark Matsunaga	Democratic	1962	Incumbent retired to run for U.S. senator. Democratic hold.	✓ Cecil Heftel (Democratic) 43.6%; Frederick Rohlfing (Republican) 39.1%; Kathy Joyce Hoshijo (Independent) 17.3%
Hawaii 2	Patsy Mink	Democratic	1964	Incumbent retired to run for U.S. senator. Democratic hold.	✓ Daniel Akaka (Democratic) 79.5%; Hank Inouye (Republican) 15.3%; Bill Penaroza (Independent) 2.2%; Dexter L. Cate (Peoples) 1.5%; Don Smith (Libertarian) 1.4%

== Idaho ==
District	Incumbent			This race	
District	Member	Party	First elected	Results	Candidates
Idaho 1	Steve Symms	Republican	1972	Incumbent re-elected.	✓ Steve Symms (Republican) 54.6%; Ken Pursley (Democratic) 45.4%
Idaho 2	George V. Hansen	Republican	1964; 1968 (retired); 1974	Incumbent re-elected.	✓ George V. Hansen (Republican) 50.6%; Stan Kress (Democratic) 49.4%

== Illinois ==
District	Incumbent			This race	
District	Member	Party	First elected	Results	Candidates
Illinois 1	Ralph Metcalfe	Democratic	1970	Incumbent re-elected.	✓ Ralph Metcalfe (Democratic) 92.3%; A. A. Rayner Jr. (Republican) 7.4%; Debra Simonsen (Workers) 0.2%; Andrew C. Pulley (Socialist Workers) 0.1%
Illinois 2	Morgan F. Murphy	Democratic	1970	Incumbent re-elected.	✓ Morgan F. Murphy (Democratic) 84.7%; Spencer Leak (Republican) 15.3%
Illinois 3	Marty Russo	Democratic	1974	Incumbent re-elected.	✓ Marty Russo (Democratic) 58.9%; Ronald Buikema (Republican) 40.5%; Frank Collin (White Power) 0.7%
Illinois 4	Ed Derwinski	Republican	1958	Incumbent re-elected.	✓ Ed Derwinski (Republican) 65.8%; Ronald A. Rodger (Democratic) 34.2%
Illinois 5	John G. Fary	Democratic	1975	Incumbent re-elected.	✓ John G. Fary (Democratic) 76.9%; Vincent Krok (Republican) 23.1%
Illinois 6	Henry Hyde	Republican	1974	Incumbent re-elected.	✓ Henry Hyde (Republican) 60.6%; Marilyn D. Clancy (Democratic) 39.4%
Illinois 7	Cardiss Collins	Democratic	1973	Incumbent re-elected.	✓ Cardiss Collins (Democratic) 84.8%; Newell Ward (Republican) 15.2%
Illinois 8	Dan Rostenkowski	Democratic	1958	Incumbent re-elected.	✓ Dan Rostenkowski (Democratic) 80.5%; John F. Urbaszewski (Republican) 19.5%
Illinois 9	Sidney R. Yates	Democratic	1948; 1962 (retired); 1964	Incumbent re-elected.	✓ Sidney R. Yates (Democratic) 72.2%; Thomas J. Wajerski (Republican) 27.8%
Illinois 10	Abner Mikva	Democratic	1968; 1972 (defeated); 1974	Incumbent re-elected.	✓ Abner Mikva (Democratic) 50.0%; Samuel H. Young (Republican) 50.0%
Illinois 11	Frank Annunzio	Democratic	1964	Incumbent re-elected.	✓ Frank Annunzio (Democratic) 67.4%; Daniel C. Reber (Republican) 32.6%
Illinois 12	Phil Crane	Republican	1969	Incumbent re-elected.	✓ Phil Crane (Republican) 72.8%; Edwin L. Frank (Democratic) 27.2%
Illinois 13	Robert McClory	Republican	1962	Incumbent re-elected.	✓ Robert McClory (Republican) 66.8%; James J. Cummings (Democratic) 30.3%; Donald G. DesLauriers (Independent) 2.9%
Illinois 14	John N. Erlenborn	Republican	1964	Incumbent re-elected.	✓ John N. Erlenborn (Republican) 74.4%; Marie Agnes Fese (Democratic) 25.6%
Illinois 15	Tim Lee Hall	Democratic	1974	Lost re-election Republican gain.	✓ Tom Corcoran (Republican) 53.9%; Tim Lee Hall (Democratic) 46.1%
Illinois 16	John B. Anderson	Republican	1960	Incumbent re-elected.	✓ John B. Anderson (Republican) 67.9%; Stephen Eytalis (Democratic) 32.1%
Illinois 17	George M. O'Brien	Republican	1972	Incumbent re-elected.	✓ George M. O'Brien (Republican) 58.2%; Merlin Karlock (Democratic) 41.8%
Illinois 18	Robert H. Michel	Republican	1956	Incumbent re-elected.	✓ Robert H. Michel (Republican) 57.7%; Matthew Ryan (Democratic) 42.3%
Illinois 19	Tom Railsback	Republican	1966	Incumbent re-elected.	✓ Tom Railsback (Republican) 68.5%; John Craver (Democratic) 31.5%
Illinois 20	Paul Findley	Republican	1960	Incumbent re-elected.	✓ Paul Findley (Republican) 63.6%; Peter F. Mack (Democratic) 36.4%
Illinois 21	Ed Madigan	Republican	1972	Incumbent re-elected.	✓ Ed Madigan (Republican) 74.5%; Anna Wall Scott (Democratic) 25.5%
Illinois 22	George E. Shipley	Democratic	1958	Incumbent re-elected.	✓ George E. Shipley (Democratic) 61.4%; Ralph Y. McGinnis (Republican) 38.6%
Illinois 23	Melvin Price	Democratic	1944	Incumbent re-elected.	✓ Melvin Price (Democratic) 78.6%; Sam P. Drenovac (Republican) 21.4%
Illinois 24	Paul Simon	Democratic	1974	Incumbent re-elected.	✓ Paul Simon (Democratic) 67.4%; Peter G. Prineas (Republican) 32.6%

== Indiana ==
District	Incumbent			This race	
District	Member	Party	First elected	Results	Candidates
Indiana 1	Ray Madden	Democratic	1942	Lost renomination Democratic hold.	✓ Adam Benjamin Jr. (Democratic) 71.3%; Robert J. Billings (Republican) 28.7%
Indiana 2	Floyd Fithian	Democratic	1974	Incumbent re-elected.	✓ Floyd Fithian (Democratic) 54.7%; William W. Erwin (Republican) 44.5%; James Hensley Logan (American) 0.8%
Indiana 3	John Brademas	Democratic	1958	Incumbent re-elected.	✓ John Brademas (Democratic) 56.9%; Thomas L. Thorson (Republican) 43.1%
Indiana 4	J. Edward Roush	Democratic	1958; 1968 (defeated); 1970	Lost re-election Republican gain.	✓ Dan Quayle (Republican) 54.4%; J. Edward Roush (Democratic) 44.6%; Gail E. Gran (American) 1.0%
Indiana 5	Elwood Hillis	Republican	1970	Incumbent re-elected.	✓ Elwood Hillis (Republican) 61.7%; William C. Stout (Democratic) 38.3%
Indiana 6	David W. Evans	Democratic	1974	Incumbent re-elected.	✓ David W. Evans (Democratic) 54.9%; David G. Crane (Republican) 45.1%
Indiana 7	John T. Myers	Republican	1966	Incumbent re-elected.	✓ John T. Myers (Republican) 62.7%; John E. Tipton (Democratic) 37.3%
Indiana 8	Philip H. Hayes	Democratic	1974	Incumbent retired to run for U.S. senator. Democratic hold.	✓ David L. Cornwell (Democratic) 50.5%; Belden Bell (Republican) 49.5%
Indiana 9	Lee H. Hamilton	Democratic	1964	Incumbent re-elected.	✓ Lee H. Hamilton (Democratic); Unopposed
Indiana 10	Philip Sharp	Democratic	1974	Incumbent re-elected.	✓ Philip Sharp (Democratic) 59.8%; Bill Frazier (Republican) 40.2%
Indiana 11	Andrew Jacobs Jr.	Democratic	1964; 1972 (defeated); 1974	Incumbent re-elected.	✓ Andrew Jacobs Jr. (Democratic) 60.4%; Lawrence L. Buell (Republican) 39.0%; John A. Einemann (American) 0.6%

== Iowa ==
District	Incumbent			This race	
District	Member	Party	First elected	Results	Candidates
Iowa 1	Edward Mezvinsky	Democratic	1972	Lost re-election Republican gain.	✓ Jim Leach (Republican) 51.9%; Edward Mezvinsky (Democratic) 47.8%; Larry D. Smith (American) 0.2%
Iowa 2	Mike Blouin	Democratic	1974	Incumbent re-elected.	✓ Mike Blouin (Democratic) 50.3%; Tom Riley (Republican) 49.1%; James D. Roberson (Independent) 0.4%; Lorin E. Oxley (American) 0.2%
Iowa 3	Chuck Grassley	Republican	1974	Incumbent re-elected.	✓ Chuck Grassley (Republican) 56.5%; Stephen J. Rapp (Democratic) 43.5%
Iowa 4	Neal Edward Smith	Democratic	1958	Incumbent re-elected.	✓ Neal Edward Smith (Democratic) 69.1%; Charles E. Minor (Republican) 30.9%
Iowa 5	Tom Harkin	Democratic	1974	Incumbent re-elected.	✓ Tom Harkin (Democratic) 64.9%; Kenneth R. Fulk (Republican) 34.1%; Verlyn LeRoy Hayes (American) 1.0%
Iowa 6	Berkley Bedell	Democratic	1974	Incumbent re-elected.	✓ Berkley Bedell (Democratic) 67.4%; Joanne D. Soper (Republican) 31.5%; William David Mincer (American) 1.1%

== Kansas ==
District	Incumbent			This race	
District	Member	Party	First elected	Results	Candidates
Kansas 1	Keith Sebelius	Republican	1968	Incumbent re-elected.	✓ Keith Sebelius (Republican) 73.1%; Randy Yowell (Democratic) 26.9%
Kansas 2	Martha Keys	Democratic	1974	Incumbent re-elected.	✓ Martha Keys (Democratic) 50.7%; Ross Freeman (Republican) 47.4%; Charles V. "Chuck" Ijams (American) 1.1%; David Scoggin (Proh) 0.8%
Kansas 3	Larry Winn	Republican	1966	Incumbent re-elected.	✓ Larry Winn (Republican) 68.7%; Philip S. Rhoads (Democratic) 29.0%; William W. Hyatt (American) 2.3%
Kansas 4	Garner E. Shriver	Republican	1960	Lost re-election Democratic gain.	✓ Dan Glickman (Democratic) 50.3%; Garner E. Shriver (Republican) 48.5%; Robert A. Cowdrey (American) 1.3%
Kansas 5	Joe Skubitz	Republican	1962	Incumbent re-elected.	✓ Joe Skubitz (Republican) 60.7%; Virgil Leon Olson (Democratic) 36.2%; Glen L. Rutherford (American) 3.2%

== Kentucky ==
District	Incumbent			This race	
District	Member	Party	First elected	Results	Candidates
Kentucky 1	Carroll Hubbard	Democratic	1974	Incumbent re-elected.	✓ Carroll Hubbard (Democratic) 82.0%; Bob Bersky (Republican) 18.0%
Kentucky 2	William Natcher	Democratic	1953 (Special)	Incumbent re-elected.	✓ William Natcher (Democratic) 60.4%; Walter A. Baker (Republican) 39.6%
Kentucky 3	Romano Mazzoli	Democratic	1970	Incumbent re-elected.	✓ Romano Mazzoli (Democratic) 57.2%; Denzil J. Ramsey (Republican) 41.2%; William P. Chambers (American) 1.6%
Kentucky 4	Gene Snyder	Republican	1962; 1964 (defeated); 1966	Incumbent re-elected.	✓ Gene Snyder (Republican) 55.9%; Edward J. Winterberg (Democratic) 44.1%
Kentucky 5	Tim Lee Carter	Republican	1964	Incumbent re-elected.	✓ Tim Lee Carter (Republican) 66.6%; Charles C. Smith (Democratic) 32.7%; Albert G. J. Cullum (American) 0.7%
Kentucky 6	John B. Breckinridge	Democratic	1972	Incumbent re-elected.	✓ John B. Breckinridge (Democratic) 94.0%; Anthony A. McCord (Republican) 6.0%
Kentucky 7	Carl D. Perkins	Democratic	1948	Incumbent re-elected.	✓ Carl D. Perkins (Democratic) 71.3%; Granville Thomas (Republican) 28.7%

== Louisiana ==
District	Incumbent			This race	
District	Member	Party	First elected	Results	Candidates
Louisiana 1	F. Edward Hébert	Democratic	1940	Incumbent retired. Democratic hold.	✓ Richard Alvin Tonry (Democratic) 47.2%; Bob Livingston (Republican) 43.4%; John R. Rarick (Independent) 9.4%
Louisiana 2	Lindy Boggs	Democratic	1973	Incumbent re-elected.	✓ Lindy Boggs (Democratic) 92.6%; Jules W. "Ted" Hillery (Independent) 7.4%
Louisiana 3	Dave Treen	Republican	1972	Incumbent re-elected.	✓ Dave Treen (Republican) 73.3%; David H. "Pro" Scheuermann Jr. (Democratic) 26.7%
Louisiana 4	Joe Waggonner	Democratic	1961	Incumbent re-elected.	✓ Joe Waggonner (Democratic); Unopposed
Louisiana 5	Otto Passman	Democratic	1946	Lost renomination Democratic hold.	✓ Jerry Huckaby (Democratic) 52.5%; Frank Spooner (Republican) 47.5%
Louisiana 6	Henson Moore	Republican	1974	Incumbent re-elected.	✓ Henson Moore (Republican) 65.2%; J. D. De Blieux (Democratic) 34.8%
Louisiana 7	John Breaux	Democratic	1972	Incumbent re-elected.	✓ John Breaux (Democratic) 83.3%; Charles F. "Chuck" Huff (Republican) 16.7%
Louisiana 8	Gillis William Long	Democratic	1962; 1964 (lost renomination); 1972	Incumbent re-elected.	✓ Gillis William Long (Democratic) 94.2%; Kent Courtney (Independent) 5.8%

== Maine ==
District	Incumbent			This race	
District	Member	Party	First elected	Results	Candidates
Maine 1	David F. Emery	Republican	1974	Incumbent re-elected.	✓ David F. Emery (Republican) 57.4%; Frederick D. Barton (Democratic) 42.6%
Maine 2	William Cohen	Republican	1972	Incumbent re-elected.	✓ William Cohen (Republican) 77.1%; Leighton Cooney (Democratic) 19.7%; Jacqueline Francis Kaye (Independent) 3.2%

== Maryland ==
District	Incumbent			This race	
District	Member	Party	First elected	Results	Candidates
Maryland 1	Robert Bauman	Republican	1973	Incumbent re-elected.	✓ Robert Bauman (Republican) 54.1%; Roy Dyson (Democratic) 45.9%
Maryland 2	Clarence Long	Democratic	1962	Incumbent re-elected.	✓ Clarence Long (Democratic) 70.9%; John M. Seney (Republican) 18.0%; Ronald A. Meroney (Independent) 11.1%
Maryland 3	Paul Sarbanes	Democratic	1970	Incumbent retired to run for U.S. senator. Democratic hold.	✓ Barbara Mikulski (Democratic) 74.6%; Samuel A. Culotta (Republican) 25.4%
Maryland 4	Marjorie Holt	Republican	1972	Incumbent re-elected.	✓ Marjorie Holt (Republican) 57.7%; Werner Fornos (Democratic) 42.3%
Maryland 5	Gladys Spellman	Democratic	1974	Incumbent re-elected.	✓ Gladys Spellman (Democratic) 57.7%; John B. Burcham Jr. (Republican) 42.3%
Maryland 6	Goodloe Byron	Democratic	1970	Incumbent re-elected.	✓ Goodloe Byron (Democratic) 70.8%; Arthur T. Bond (Republican) 29.2%
Maryland 7	Parren Mitchell	Democratic	1970	Incumbent re-elected.	✓ Parren Mitchell (Democratic) 94.4%; William Salisbury (Independent) 5.6%
Maryland 8	Gilbert Gude	Republican	1966	Incumbent retired. Republican hold.	✓ Newton Steers (Republican) 46.8%; Lanny Davis (Democratic) 42.2%; Robin Ficker (Independent) 11.0%

== Massachusetts ==
District	Incumbent			This race	
District	Member	Party	First elected	Results	Candidates
Massachusetts 1	Silvio O. Conte	Republican	1958	Incumbent re-elected.	✓ Silvio O. Conte (Republican) 63.8%; Edward A. McColgan (Democratic) 36.2%
Massachusetts 2	Edward Boland	Democratic	1952	Incumbent re-elected.	✓ Edward Boland (Democratic) 72.4%; Thomas P. Swank (Republican) 22.4%; John D. McCarthy (Labor) 5.3%
Massachusetts 3	Joseph D. Early	Democratic	1974	Incumbent re-elected.	✓ Joseph D. Early (Democratic); Unopposed
Massachusetts 4	Robert Drinan	Democratic	1970	Incumbent re-elected.	✓ Robert Drinan (Democratic) 52.1%; Arthur D. Mason (Republican) 47.9%
Massachusetts 5	Paul Tsongas	Democratic	1974	Incumbent re-elected.	✓ Paul Tsongas (Democratic) 67.3%; Roger P. Durkin (Republican) 32.7%
Massachusetts 6	Michael J. Harrington	Democratic	1969	Incumbent re-elected.	✓ Michael J. Harrington (Democratic) 54.8%; William E. Bronson (Republican) 41.3%; Lillian Cundari McGowan (Independent) 3.9%
Massachusetts 7	Vacant			Torbert Macdonald (D) died May 21, 1976. New member elected. Democratic hold. Winner was also elected to fill the unexpired term, see above.	✓ Ed Markey (Democratic) 76.9%; Richard W. Daly (Republican) 17.6%; James J. Murphy (Independent) 3.3%; Harry G. Chickles (Independent) 2.3%
Massachusetts 8	Tip O'Neill	Democratic	1952	Incumbent re-elected.	✓ Tip O'Neill (Democratic) 74.4%; William A. Barnstead (Republican) 18.7%; Florenzo Di Donato (Independent) 4.6%; Leo F. Kahian (American) 2.2%
Massachusetts 9	Joe Moakley	Democratic	1972	Incumbent re-elected.	✓ Joe Moakley (Democratic) 69.6%; Robert G. Cunningham (Republican) 23.1%; Joseph M. O'Loughlin (Independent) 5.3%; James "Mac" Warren (Socialist Workers) 2.0%
Massachusetts 10	Margaret Heckler	Republican	1966	Incumbent re-elected.	✓ Margaret Heckler (Republican); Unopposed
Massachusetts 11	James A. Burke	Democratic	1958	Incumbent re-elected.	✓ James A. Burke (Democratic) 69.0%; Danielle De Benedictis (Independent) 31.0%
Massachusetts 12	Gerry Studds	Democratic	1972	Incumbent re-elected.	✓ Gerry Studds (Democratic); Unopposed

== Michigan ==
District	Incumbent			This race	
District	Member	Party	First elected	Results	Candidates
Michigan 1	John Conyers Jr.	Democratic	1964	Incumbent re-elected.	✓ John Conyers Jr. (Democratic) 92.4%; Issac Hood (Republican) 6.5%; Hector M. McGregor (American Independent) 0.5%; B. R. Washington (Socialist Workers) 0.2%; Thomas W. Jones (Libertarian) 0.2%; Carolyn Nelson (Labor) 0.2%
Michigan 2	Marvin L. Esch	Republican	1966	Incumbent retired to run for U.S. senator. Republican hold.	✓ Carl Pursell (Republican) 49.8%; Edward C. Pierce (Democratic) 49.6%; Philip S. Carroll (Human Rights) 0.3%; Lawrence McKenna (Libertarian) 0.2%; Ronald G. Ziegler (Labor) 0.1%
Michigan 3	Garry E. Brown	Republican	1966	Incumbent re-elected.	✓ Garry E. Brown (Republican) 50.6%; Howard Wolpe (Democratic) 48.6%; Timothy W. Walter (American Independent) 0.6%; Charles H. Todd (Libertarian) 0.2%; Leda J. Stevens (Labor) 0.06%
Michigan 4	J. Edward Hutchinson	Republican	1962	Incumbent retired. Republican hold.	✓ David Stockman (Republican) 60.0%; Richard E. Daugherty (Democratic) 38.8%; Karl Friske (American Independent) 1.0%; Russell Severance (Libertarian) 0.2%; David M. Hilty (Labor) 0.07%
Michigan 5	Richard F. Vander Veen	Democratic	1974	Lost re-election Republican gain.	✓ Harold S. Sawyer (Republican) 53.3%; Richard F. Vander Veen (Democratic) 46.2%; Joe Berman (Libertarian) 0.2%; Gary D. Powell (Labor) 0.2%
Michigan 6	Milton Robert Carr	Democratic	1974	Incumbent re-elected.	✓ Milton Robert Carr (Democratic) 52.7%; Clifford W. Taylor (Republican) 46.5%; James F. McClure (Human Rights) 0.7%; Andrew Rotstein (Labor) 0.09%
Michigan 7	Donald Riegle	Democratic	1966	Incumbent retired to run for U.S. senator. Democratic hold.	✓ Dale E. Kildee (Democratic) 70.0%; Robin Widgery (Republican) 28.3%; Jimmy L. Sabin (American Independent) 0.8%; Max Dean (Labor) 0.5%; Benjamin G. Hoffman (Libertarian) 0.4%
Michigan 8	J. Bob Traxler	Democratic	1974	Incumbent re-elected.	✓ J. Bob Traxler (Democratic) 59.0%; E. Brady Denton (Republican) 40.4%; Charles G. Johns (American Independent) 0.5%; David W. Thill (Labor) 0.1%
Michigan 9	Guy Vander Jagt	Republican	1966	Incumbent re-elected.	✓ Guy Vander Jagt (Republican) 70.0%; Stephen E. Fawley (Democratic) 29.4%; DeLoyd G. Hesselink (American Independent) 0.5%; Joy Powell (Labor) 0.10%; William G. Friesser (Soc-Lab) 0.06%
Michigan 10	Elford Albin Cederberg	Republican	1952	Incumbent re-elected.	✓ Elford Albin Cederberg (Republican) 56.5%; Donald J. Albosta (Democratic) 42.8%; Lawrence Dean (American Independent) 0.6%; Joseph D. D'Urso (Labor) 0.1%
Michigan 11	Philip Ruppe	Republican	1966	Incumbent re-elected.	✓ Philip Ruppe (Republican) 54.8%; Francis D. Brouillette (Democratic) 44.8%; Elizabeth D. Pape (American Independent) 0.2%; Edward W. Aho (Human Rights) 0.1%; John C. Hoffman (Labor) 0.07%
Michigan 12	James G. O'Hara	Democratic	1958	Incumbent retired to run for U.S. senator. Democratic hold.	✓ David Bonior (Democratic) 52.4%; David M. Serotkin (Republican) 47.2%; Gregory J. Clark (Libertarian) 0.2%; Marielle Hammett Kronberg (Labor) 0.2%
Michigan 13	Charles Diggs	Democratic	1954	Incumbent re-elected.	✓ Charles Diggs (Democratic) 89.0%; Richard A. Golden (Republican) 9.6%; Raymond Houle (American Independent) 0.5%; John Hawkins (Socialist Workers) 0.4%; Melvin Brown (Labor) 0.3%; Harold L. DeWaters (Libertarian) 0.2%
Michigan 14	Lucien Nedzi	Democratic	1961	Incumbent re-elected.	✓ Lucien Nedzi (Democratic) 66.5%; John Edward Getz (Republican) 32.8%; Maurice Geary (Human Rights) 0.3%; Marshall F. Moser (Libertarian) 0.2%; Martha Hilty (Labor) 0.1%; Mark Severs (Socialist Workers) 0.1%
Michigan 15	William D. Ford	Democratic	1964	Incumbent re-elected.	✓ William D. Ford (Democratic) 74.0%; James D. Walaskay (Republican) 24.7%; Aldi C. Fuhrmann (American Independent) 0.5%; Kathryn M. Augustin (Libertarian) 0.5%; John Sarkisian (Soc-Lab) 0.2%; Allen Douglas (Labor) 0.1%
Michigan 16	John D. Dingell Jr.	Democratic	1955	Incumbent re-elected.	✓ John D. Dingell Jr. (Democratic) 75.9%; William E. Rostron (Republican) 22.7%; Buck Miller Slayter (American Independent) 0.6%; Samuel S. Hancock (Libertarian) 0.3%; Susann L. Dalto (Labor) 0.3%; Donald A. Bechler (Socialist Workers) 0.2%
Michigan 17	William M. Brodhead	Democratic	1974	Incumbent re-elected.	✓ William M. Brodhead (Democratic) 64.2%; James W. Burdick (Republican) 34.4%; Arve Bakken (American Independent) 0.8%; Christy L. Wallace (Socialist Workers) 0.3%; C. M. Novess III (Libertarian) 0.2%; Scott Elliott (Labor) 0.1%
Michigan 18	James J. Blanchard	Democratic	1974	Incumbent re-elected.	✓ James J. Blanchard (Democratic) 66.1%; John E. Olsen (Republican) 32.8%; David Wengel Drexler (American Independent) 0.6%; Frank G. Rising (Libertarian) 0.2%; K. Martin Keller (Labor) 0.2%; James C. Horvath (Soc-Lab) 0.1%
Michigan 19	William Broomfield	Republican	1956	Incumbent re-elected.	✓ William Broomfield (Republican) 66.7%; Dorthea Becker (Democratic) 32.6%; John Omar Muotka (American Independent) 0.4%; Therese S. Barbone (Libertarian) 0.3%; Thomas Simpson (Labor) 0.1%

== Minnesota ==
District	Incumbent			This race	
District	Member	Party	First elected	Results	Candidates
Minnesota 1	Al Quie	Ind.-Republican	1958	Incumbent re-elected.	✓ Al Quie (Republican) 68.2%; Robert C. "Bob" Olson Jr. (DFL) 30.5%; Lloyd Duwe (American) 1.3%
Minnesota 2	Tom Hagedorn	Ind.-Republican	1974	Incumbent re-elected.	✓ Tom Hagedorn (Republican) 60.3%; Gloria Griffin (DFL) 39.7%
Minnesota 3	Bill Frenzel	Ind.-Republican	1970	Incumbent re-elected.	✓ Bill Frenzel (Republican) 66.1%; Jerome W. Coughlin (DFL) 32.0%; Clifford C. Mathias (American) 2.0%
Minnesota 4	Joseph Karth	DFL	1958	Incumbent retired. Democratic hold.	✓ Bruce Vento (DFL) 66.4%; Andrew Engebretson (Republican) 29.8%; Alan W. Uhl (Independent) 1.5%; Thomas F. Piotrowski (Libertarian) 1.4%; Ralph Schwartz (Socialist Workers) 0.9%
Minnesota 5	Donald M. Fraser	DFL	1962	Incumbent re-elected.	✓ Donald M. Fraser (DFL) 70.7%; Richard M. Erdall (Republican) 26.0%; Jack O. Kirkham (American) 1.6%; Chris Frank (Socialist Workers) 0.9%; Franklin T. Haws (Libertarian) 0.5%; Jean T. Brust (Workers) 0.3%
Minnesota 6	Rick Nolan	DFL	1974	Incumbent re-elected.	✓ Rick Nolan (DFL) 59.8%; James "Jim" Anderson (Republican) 40.2%
Minnesota 7	Bob Bergland	DFL	1970	Incumbent re-elected.	✓ Bob Bergland (DFL) 72.3%; Bob Leiseth (Republican) 26.3%; Stanley A. Carlson (Libertarian) 1.3%
Minnesota 8	Jim Oberstar	DFL	1974	Incumbent re-elected.	✓ Jim Oberstar (DFL) Unopposed

== Mississippi ==
District	Incumbent			This race	
District	Member	Party	First elected	Results	Candidates
Mississippi 1	Jamie Whitten	Democratic	1941	Incumbent re-elected.	✓ Jamie Whitten (Democratic); Unopposed
Mississippi 2	David R. Bowen	Democratic	1972	Incumbent re-elected.	✓ David R. Bowen (Democratic) 63.0%; Roland Byrd (Republican) 35.7%; H. B. Wells (American) 1.2%
Mississippi 3	Sonny Montgomery	Democratic	1966	Incumbent re-elected.	✓ Sonny Montgomery (Democratic) 93.9%; Dorothy Colby Cleveland (Republican) 6.1%
Mississippi 4	Thad Cochran	Republican	1972	Incumbent re-elected.	✓ Thad Cochran (Republican) 76.0%; Sterling P. Davis (Democratic) 21.6%; B. L. Norman (American) 1.4%; Luther G. Latham (Independent) 0.9%
Mississippi 5	Trent Lott	Republican	1972	Incumbent re-elected.	✓ Trent Lott (Republican) 68.2%; Gerald Blessey (Democratic) 31.8%

== Missouri ==
District	Incumbent			This race	
District	Member	Party	First elected	Results	Candidates
Missouri 1	Bill Clay	Democratic	1968	Incumbent re-elected.	✓ Bill Clay (Democratic) 65.6%; Robert L. Witherspoon (Republican) 34.4%
Missouri 2	James W. Symington	Democratic	1968	Incumbent retired to run for U.S. senator. Democratic hold.	✓ Robert A. Young (Democratic) 51.1%; Robert O. Snyder (Republican) 48.9%
Missouri 3	Leonor Sullivan	Democratic	1952	Incumbent retired. Democratic hold.	✓ Dick Gephardt (Democratic) 63.7%; Joseph L. Badaracco (Republican) 36.3%
Missouri 4	William J. Randall	Democratic	1959	Incumbent retired. Democratic hold.	✓ Ike Skelton (Democratic) 55.9%; Richard A. King (Republican) 44.1%
Missouri 5	Richard Bolling	Democratic	1948	Incumbent re-elected.	✓ Richard Bolling (Democratic) 68.0%; Joanne M. Collins (Republican) 28.1%; William F. "Bill" Moore (Independent) 3.9%
Missouri 6	Vacant			Jerry Litton (D) died August 3, 1976. Republican gain. Winner was also elected to fill the unexpired term, see above.	✓ Tom Coleman (Republican) 58.5%; Morgan Maxfield (Democratic) 40.5%; Raymond W. Thompson (Independent) 0.9%
Missouri 7	Gene Taylor	Republican	1972	Incumbent re-elected.	✓ Gene Taylor (Republican) 62.0%; Dolan G. Hawkins (Democratic) 38.0%
Missouri 8	Richard Howard Ichord Jr.	Democratic	1960	Incumbent re-elected.	✓ Richard Howard Ichord Jr. (Democratic) 67.3%; Charles R. Leick (Republican) 30.6%; Stuart M. Leiderman (Independent) 2.1%
Missouri 9	William L. Hungate	Democratic	1964	Incumbent retired. Democratic hold.	✓ Harold Volkmer (Democratic) 55.9%; Joe Frappier (Republican) 44.1%
Missouri 10	Bill Burlison	Democratic	1968	Incumbent re-elected.	✓ Bill Burlison (Democratic) 72.1%; Joe Carron (Republican) 27.9%

== Montana ==
District	Incumbent			This race	
District	Member	Party	First elected	Results	Candidates
Montana 1	Max Baucus	Democratic	1974	Incumbent re-elected.	✓ Max Baucus (Democratic) 66.4%; W. D. "Bill" Diehl (Republican) 33.6%
Montana 2	John Melcher	Democratic	1969	Incumbent retired to run for U.S. senator. Republican gain.	✓ Ron Marlenee (Republican) 55.0%; Thomas E. Towe (Democratic) 45.0%

== Nebraska ==
District	Incumbent			This race	
District	Member	Party	First elected	Results	Candidates
Nebraska 1	Charles Thone	Republican	1970	Incumbent re-elected.	✓ Charles Thone (Republican) 73.2%; Pauline F. Anderson (Democratic) 26.8%
Nebraska 2	John Y. McCollister	Republican	1970	Incumbent retired to run for U.S. senator. Democratic gain.	✓ John Joseph Cavanaugh III (Democratic) 54.6%; Lee Terry (Republican) 45.4%
Nebraska 3	Virginia D. Smith	Republican	1974	Incumbent re-elected.	✓ Virginia D. Smith (Republican) 72.9%; James Thomas Hansen (Democratic) 24.7%; William W. Steen (American) 2.4%

== Nevada ==
District	Incumbent			This race	
District	Member	Party	First elected	Results	Candidates
Nevada at-large	James David Santini	Democratic	1974	Incumbent re-elected.	✓ James David Santini (Democratic) 77.1%; Walden Charles Earhart (Republican) 12.1%; Janine M. Hansen (Independent) 6.0%; None of These Candidates 3.4%; James Burns (Libertarian) 1.4%

== New Hampshire ==
District	Incumbent			This race	
District	Member	Party	First elected	Results	Candidates
New Hampshire 1	Norman D'Amours	Democratic	1974	Incumbent re-elected.	✓ Norman D'Amours (Democratic) 68.1%; John Adams (Republican) 30.4%; John H. O'Brien (Libertarian) 1.5%
New Hampshire 2	James Colgate Cleveland	Republican	1962	Incumbent re-elected.	✓ James Colgate Cleveland (Republican) 60.5%; J. Joseph Grandmaison (Democratic) 39.5%

== New Jersey ==
District	Incumbent			This race	
District	Member	Party	First elected	Results	Candidates
New Jersey 1	James Florio	Democratic	1974	Incumbent re-elected.	✓ James Florio (Democratic) 70.1%; Joseph I. McCullough Jr. (Republican) 28.9%; Vernon A. Smith (Libertarian) 0.4%; Thomas C. Sloan (Independent) 0.4%; Robert Bowen (Labor) 0.2%
New Jersey 2	William J. Hughes	Democratic	1974	Incumbent re-elected.	✓ William J. Hughes (Democratic) 61.7%; James R. Hurley (Republican) 38.3%
New Jersey 3	James J. Howard	Democratic	1964	Incumbent re-elected.	✓ James J. Howard (Democratic) 62.1%; Ralph A. Siciliano (Republican) 37.1%; Walter M. Swirsky (Libertarian) 0.8%
New Jersey 4	Frank Thompson	Democratic	1954	Incumbent re-elected.	✓ Frank Thompson (Democratic) 66.3%; Joseph S. Indyk (Republican) 32.1%; John Valjean Mahalchik (Independent) 0.8%; Jack Moyers (Libertarian) 0.6%; Elliot Greenspan (Labor) 0.2%
New Jersey 5	Millicent Fenwick	Republican	1974	Incumbent re-elected.	✓ Millicent Fenwick (Republican) 66.9%; Frank R. Nero (Democratic) 31.3%; Jane T. Rehmke (Libertarian) 0.8%; John Giammarco (Pro-Life) 0.7%; Joseph R. Viola Jr. (Independent) 0.2%
New Jersey 6	Edwin B. Forsythe	Republican	1970	Incumbent re-elected.	✓ Edwin B. Forsythe (Republican) 58.8%; Catherine A. Costa (Democratic) 39.7%; Richard D. Amber (American) 0.5%; Samuel E. Brown (Libertarian) 0.5%; Joseph J. Byrne (Independent) 0.4%; Marc David Silverstein (Independent) 0.1%
New Jersey 7	Andrew Maguire	Democratic	1974	Incumbent re-elected.	✓ Andrew Maguire (Democratic) 56.5%; James J. Sheehan (Republican) 43.5%
New Jersey 8	Robert A. Roe	Democratic	1970	Incumbent re-elected.	✓ Robert A. Roe (Democratic) 70.6%; Bessie Doty (Republican) 29.0%; Gilbert G. Doll (Libertarian) 0.4%
New Jersey 9	Henry Helstoski	Democratic	1964	Lost re-election Republican gain.	✓ Harold C. Hollenbeck (Republican) 53.1%; Henry Helstoski (Democratic) 44.3%; Herbert H. Shaw (Independent) 0.9%; Frank J. Primich (Libertarian) 0.9%; James J. Terlizzi (Independent) 0.8%
New Jersey 10	Peter W. Rodino	Democratic	1948	Incumbent re-elected.	✓ Peter W. Rodino (Democratic) 82.6%; Tony Grandison (Republican) 16.0%; Kathleen A. McAdam (Libertarian) 0.8%; Lawrence Stewart (Socialist Workers) 0.3%; Charles Mack (Labor) 0.2%
New Jersey 11	Joseph Minish	Democratic	1962	Incumbent re-elected.	✓ Joseph Minish (Democratic) 67.6%; Charles A. Poekel Jr. (Republican) 31.1%; Warren T. Kupchik (Libertarian) 0.9%; Joseph A. Rogers (Independent) 0.3%
New Jersey 12	Matthew John Rinaldo	Republican	1972	Incumbent re-elected.	✓ Matthew John Rinaldo (Republican) 73.1%; Richard A. Buggelli (Democratic) 26.3%; Paul M. Geyer (American) 0.3%; Vincent Miskell (Labor) 0.3%
New Jersey 13	Helen Meyner	Democratic	1974	Incumbent re-elected.	✓ Helen Meyner (Democratic) 50.4%; William E. Schluter (Republican) 47.9%; F. Edward De Mott (Independent) 1.0%; Joseph Mayer (Independent) 0.7%
New Jersey 14	Dominick V. Daniels	Democratic	1958	Incumbent retired. Democratic hold.	✓ Joseph A. LeFante (Democratic) 49.9%; Anthony Louis Campenni (Republican) 45.2%; Kenneth C. McCarthy (Independent) 2.7%; David L. Jones Jr. (Independent) 1.3%; Stuart Bronn (Labor) 0.3%; Robert Ryley (Libertarian) 0.3%; Edward W. Bergonzi (Workers) 0.3%
New Jersey 15	Edward J. Patten	Democratic	1962	Incumbent re-elected.	✓ Edward J. Patten (Democratic) 59.0%; Charles W. Wiley (Republican) 30.3%; Dennis F. Adams (Independent) 8.1%; Michael Klein (Peoples) 2.2%; Bruce E. Todd (Labor) 0.4%

== New Mexico ==
District	Incumbent			This race	
District	Member	Party	First elected	Results	Candidates
New Mexico 1	Manuel Lujan Jr.	Republican	1968	Incumbent re-elected.	✓ Manuel Lujan Jr. (Republican) 72.1%; Raymond Garcia (Democratic) 27.4%; Martin Molloy (La Raza Unida) 0.5%
New Mexico 2	Harold L. Runnels	Democratic	1970	Incumbent re-elected.	✓ Harold L. Runnels (Democratic) 70.3%; Donald W. Trubey (Republican) 29.7%

== New York ==
District	Incumbent			This race	
District	Member	Party	First elected	Results	Candidates
New York 1	Otis G. Pike	Democratic	1960	Incumbent re-elected.	✓ Otis G. Pike (Democratic) 65.3%; Salvatore Nicosia (Republican) 29.7%; Seth Morgan (Con) 4.9%
New York 2	Thomas J. Downey	Democratic	1974	Incumbent re-elected.	✓ Thomas J. Downey (Democratic) 57.1%; Peter F. Cohalan (Republican) 42.4%; Rochelle Davidson (Lib) 0.6%
New York 3	Jerome Ambro	Democratic	1974	Incumbent re-elected.	✓ Jerome Ambro (Democratic) 52.0%; Howard T. Hogan Jr. (Republican) 46.8%; Hy York (Lib) 1.3%
New York 4	Norman F. Lent	Republican	1970	Incumbent re-elected.	✓ Norman F. Lent (Republican) 55.8%; Gerald P. Halpern (Democratic) 44.2%
New York 5	John W. Wydler	Republican	1962	Incumbent re-elected.	✓ John W. Wydler (Republican) 55.7%; Allard K. Lowenstein (Democratic) 44.3%
New York 6	Lester L. Wolff	Democratic	1964	Incumbent re-elected.	✓ Lester L. Wolff (Democratic) 61.8%; Vincent R. Balletta Jr. (Republican) 33.3%; Nelson J. Gammans (Con) 4.9%
New York 7	Joseph P. Addabbo	Democratic	1960	Incumbent re-elected.	✓ Joseph P. Addabbo (Democratic) 94.7%; William H. Whitman (Con) 4.7%; Keith E. Jones (Socialist Workers) 0.7%
New York 8	Benjamin Stanley Rosenthal	Democratic	1962	Incumbent re-elected.	✓ Benjamin Stanley Rosenthal (Democratic) 77.8%; Albert Lemishow (Republican) 21.9%; Harry Brown (Socialist Workers) 0.3%
New York 9	James J. Delaney	Democratic	1944; 1946 (defeated); 1948	Incumbent re-elected.	✓ James J. Delaney (Democratic) 95.1%; Alan M. Kluger (Lib) 4.9%
New York 10	Mario Biaggi	Democratic	1968	Incumbent re-elected.	✓ Mario Biaggi (Democratic) 91.6%; Joanne S. Fuchs (Con) 5.1%; John P. Hagan (Lib) 3.3%
New York 11	James H. Scheuer	Democratic	1964; 1972 (defeated); 1974	Incumbent re-elected.	✓ James H. Scheuer (Democratic) 74.1%; Arthur Cuccia (Republican) 16.8%; Bryan F. Levinson (Con) 5.5%; Joseph Rothenberg (Lib) 3.6%
New York 12	Shirley Chisholm	Democratic	1968	Incumbent re-elected.	✓ Shirley Chisholm (Democratic) 87.0%; Horace L. Morancie (Republican) 10.8%; Martin S. Shepherd Jr. (Con) 2.2%
New York 13	Stephen J. Solarz	Democratic	1974	Incumbent re-elected.	✓ Stephen J. Solarz (Democratic) 83.7%; Jack N. Dobosh (Republican) 16.3%
New York 14	Fred Richmond	Democratic	1974	Incumbent re-elected.	✓ Fred Richmond (Democratic) 85.0%; Frank X. Gargiulo (Republican) 13.7%; Patricia Wright (Socialist Workers) 1.0%; Adele Flateau (Workers) 0.3%
New York 15	Leo C. Zeferetti	Democratic	1974	Incumbent re-elected.	✓ Leo C. Zeferetti (Democratic) 63.2%; Ronald J. D'Angelo (Republican) 30.7%; Arthur J. Paone (Lib) 6.0%
New York 16	Elizabeth Holtzman	Democratic	1972	Incumbent re-elected.	✓ Elizabeth Holtzman (Democratic) 82.9%; Gladys Pemberton (Republican) 17.1%
New York 17	John M. Murphy	Democratic	1962	Incumbent re-elected.	✓ John M. Murphy (Democratic) 65.6%; Kenneth J. Grossberger (Republican) 20.4%; John M. Peters (Con) 7.7%; Ned Schneier (Lib) 6.4%
New York 18	Ed Koch	Democratic	1968	Incumbent re-elected.	✓ Ed Koch (Democratic) 75.7%; Sonia Landau (Republican) 20.1%; James W. McConnell (Con) 4.3%
New York 19	Charles B. Rangel	Democratic	1970	Incumbent re-elected.	✓ Charles B. Rangel (Democratic) 97.0%; Benton Cole (Con) 2.3%; Helen Halyard (Workers) 0.7%
New York 20	Bella Abzug	Democratic	1970	Incumbent retired to run for U.S. senator. Democratic hold.	✓ Theodore S. Weiss (Democratic) 83.2%; Denise T. Weiseman (Republican) 12.8%; Herman Dinsmore (Con) 3.0%; Diane Steinberg (Workers) 1.0%
New York 21	Herman Badillo	Democratic	1970	Incumbent re-elected.	✓ Herman Badillo (Democratic) 98.6%; Lawrence W. Lindsley (Con) 1.4%
New York 22	Jonathan Brewster Bingham	Democratic	1964	Incumbent re-elected.	✓ Jonathan Brewster Bingham (Democratic) 86.4%; Paul Slotkin (Republican) 10.4%; Patrick J. Bonner (Con) 3.2%
New York 23	Peter A. Peyser	Republican	1970	Incumbent retired to run for U.S. senator. Republican hold.	✓ Bruce F. Caputo (Republican) 53.6%; J. Edward Meyer (Democratic) 46.4%
New York 24	Richard Ottinger	Democratic	1964; 1970 (retired); 1974	Incumbent re-elected.	✓ Richard Ottinger (Democratic) 54.5%; David V. Hicks (Republican) 44.3%; Edmund D. Assante (Lib) 1.2%
New York 25	Hamilton Fish IV	Republican	1968	Incumbent re-elected.	✓ Hamilton Fish IV (Republican) 70.5%; Minna Post Peyser (Democratic) 29.5%
New York 26	Benjamin A. Gilman	Republican	1972	Incumbent re-elected.	✓ Benjamin A. Gilman (Republican) 65.3%; John R. Maloney (Democratic) 32.9%; Eugene R. Victor (Lib) 1.9%
New York 27	Matthew F. McHugh	Democratic	1974	Incumbent re-elected.	✓ Matthew F. McHugh (Democratic) 66.6%; William H. Harter (Republican) 33.4%
New York 28	Samuel S. Stratton	Democratic	1958	Incumbent re-elected.	✓ Samuel S. Stratton (Democratic) 79.0%; Mary A. Bradt (Republican) 20.5%; Christopher Lewis (Labor) 0.5%
New York 29	Edward W. Pattison	Democratic	1974	Incumbent re-elected.	✓ Edward W. Pattison (Democratic) 47.0%; Joseph A. Martino (Republican) 45.0%; James E. De Young (Con) 7.2%; Patricia O. Brooks (Independent) 0.6%; Rocco A. Ferran (Independent) 0.2%
New York 30	Robert C. McEwen	Republican	1964	Incumbent re-elected.	✓ Robert C. McEwen (Republican) 55.7%; Norma A. Bartle (Democratic) 44.3%
New York 31	Donald J. Mitchell	Republican	1972	Incumbent re-elected.	✓ Donald J. Mitchell (Republican) 66.5%; Anita Maxwell (Democratic) 33.5%
New York 32	James M. Hanley	Democratic	1964	Incumbent re-elected.	✓ James M. Hanley (Democratic) 54.8%; George C. Wortley (Republican) 44.1%; Earl W. Colvin (Lib) 1.1%
New York 33	William F. Walsh	Republican	1972	Incumbent re-elected.	✓ William F. Walsh (Republican) 68.5%; Charles R. Welch (Democratic) 26.7%; William C. Elkins (Con) 3.3%; Lillian E. Reiner (Lib) 1.5%
New York 34	Frank Horton	Republican	1962	Incumbent re-elected.	✓ Frank Horton (Republican) 65.9%; William C. Larsen (Democratic) 30.3%; Thomas D. Cook (Con) 3.8%
New York 35	Barber Conable	Republican	1964	Incumbent re-elected.	✓ Barber Conable (Republican) 64.3%; Michael Macaluso Jr. (Democratic) 35.7%
New York 36	John J. LaFalce	Democratic	1974	Incumbent re-elected.	✓ John J. LaFalce (Democratic) 66.6%; Ralph J. Argen (Republican) 33.4%
New York 37	Henry J. Nowak	Democratic	1974	Incumbent re-elected.	✓ Henry J. Nowak (Democratic) 78.2%; Calvin Kimbrough (Republican) 18.5%; Stephen Grimm (Con) 3.3%
New York 38	Jack Kemp	Republican	1970	Incumbent re-elected.	✓ Jack Kemp (Republican) 78.2%; Peter J. Geraci (Democratic) 21.8%
New York 39	Stan Lundine	Democratic	1976	Incumbent re-elected.	✓ Stan Lundine (Democratic) 61.8%; Richard A. Snowden (Republican) 38.2%

== North Carolina ==
District	Incumbent			This race	
District	Member	Party	First elected	Results	Candidates
North Carolina 1	Walter B. Jones Sr.	Democratic	1966	Incumbent re-elected.	✓ Walter B. Jones Sr. (Democratic) 75.9%; Joseph M. Ward (Republican) 22.5%; Michael M. Parker (American) 1.6%
North Carolina 2	Lawrence H. Fountain	Democratic	1952	Incumbent re-elected.	✓ Lawrence H. Fountain (Democratic); Unopposed
North Carolina 3	David N. Henderson	Democratic	1960	Incumbent retired. Democratic hold.	✓ Charles Orville Whitley (Democratic) 68.7%; Willard J. Blanchard (Republican) 31.3%
North Carolina 4	Ike Franklin Andrews	Democratic	1972	Incumbent re-elected.	✓ Ike Franklin Andrews (Democratic) 60.6%; Johnnie L. Gallemore Jr. (Republican) 39.4%
North Carolina 5	Stephen L. Neal	Democratic	1974	Incumbent re-elected.	✓ Stephen L. Neal (Democratic) 54.2%; Wilmer Mizell (Republican) 45.6%; Geoffrey M. Hooks (Labor) 0.1%
North Carolina 6	L. Richardson Preyer	Democratic	1968	Incumbent re-elected.	✓ L. Richardson Preyer (Democratic) 96.3%; Carl Wagle (Libertarian) 2.0%; Marion Porter (Labor) 1.7%
North Carolina 7	Charlie Rose	Democratic	1972	Incumbent re-elected.	✓ Charlie Rose (Democratic) 81.3%; Mike Vaughan (Republican) 18.7%
North Carolina 8	Bill Hefner	Democratic	1974	Incumbent re-elected.	✓ Bill Hefner (Democratic) 65.7%; Carl Eagle (Republican) 32.5%; Bradford V. Ligon (American) 1.4%; Franklin H. Bell (Labor) 0.4%
North Carolina 9	James G. Martin	Republican	1972	Incumbent re-elected.	✓ James G. Martin (Republican) 53.5%; Arthur Goodman Jr. (Democratic) 46.1%; Harley Schlanger (Labor) 0.4%
North Carolina 10	Jim Broyhill	Republican	1962	Incumbent re-elected.	✓ Jim Broyhill (Republican) 59.8%; John J. Hunt (Democratic) 40.2%
North Carolina 11	Roy A. Taylor	Democratic	1960	Incumbent retired. Democratic hold.	✓ V. Lamar Gudger (Democratic) 50.9%; Bruce Briggs (Republican) 48.1%; Roy Underwood (American) 1.0%

== North Dakota ==
District	Incumbent			This race	
District	Member	Party	First elected	Results	Candidates
North Dakota at-large	Mark Andrews	Republican	1963	Incumbent re-elected.	✓ Mark Andrews (Republican) 62.5%; Lloyd Omdahl (Democratic) 36%; Russell Kleppe (American) 1.6%

== Ohio ==
District	Incumbent			This race	
District	Member	Party	First elected	Results	Candidates
Ohio 1	Bill Gradison	Republican	1974	Incumbent re-elected.	✓ Bill Gradison (Republican) 64.8%; William F. Bowen (Democratic) 33.6%; Christopher L. Martison (Independent) 1.6%
Ohio 2	Donald D. Clancy	Republican	1960	Lost re-election Democratic gain.	✓ Tom Luken (Democratic) 51.4%; Donald D. Clancy (Republican) 48.6%
Ohio 3	Charles W. Whalen Jr.	Republican	1966	Incumbent re-elected.	✓ Charles W. Whalen Jr. (Republican) 69.4%; Leonard E. Stubbs Jr. (Democratic) 23.3%; Wilmer Mark Hurst (Independent) 4.0%; John R. Austin (Independent) 3.4%
Ohio 4	Tennyson Guyer	Republican	1972	Incumbent re-elected.	✓ Tennyson Guyer (Republican) 70.1%; Clinton G. Dorsey (Democratic) 29.9%
Ohio 5	Del Latta	Republican	1958	Incumbent re-elected.	✓ Del Latta (Republican) 67.4%; Bruce Edwards (Democratic) 32.6%
Ohio 6	Bill Harsha	Republican	1960	Incumbent re-elected.	✓ Bill Harsha (Republican) 61.5%; Ted Strickland (Democratic) 38.5%
Ohio 7	Bud Brown	Republican	1965	Incumbent re-elected.	✓ Bud Brown (Republican) 64.9%; Dorothy Franke (Democratic) 35.1%
Ohio 8	Tom Kindness	Republican	1974	Incumbent re-elected.	✓ Tom Kindness (Republican) 68.7%; John W. Griffin (Democratic) 28.8%; Joseph F. Payton (Independent) 2.6%
Ohio 9	Thomas L. Ashley	Democratic	1954	Incumbent re-elected.	✓ Thomas L. Ashley (Democratic) 54.2%; Carty Finkbeiner (Republican) 44.0%; Edward Silvio Emery (Independent) 0.9%; Lynn Galonsky (Independent) 0.9%
Ohio 10	Clarence E. Miller	Republican	1966	Incumbent re-elected.	✓ Clarence E. Miller (Republican) 68.8%; James A. Plummer (Democratic) 31.2%
Ohio 11	J. William Stanton	Republican	1964	Incumbent re-elected.	✓ J. William Stanton (Republican) 71.7%; Thomas R. West Jr. (Democratic) 28.3%
Ohio 12	Samuel L. Devine	Republican	1958	Incumbent re-elected.	✓ Samuel L. Devine (Republican) 46.5%; Fran Ryan (Democratic) 45.7%; William R. Moss (Independent) 7.9%
Ohio 13	Charles Adams Mosher	Republican	1960	Incumbent retired. Democratic gain.	✓ Donald J. Pease (Democratic) 66.0%; Woodrow W. Mathna (Republican) 30.4%; Patricia A. Cortez (Independent) 3.5%
Ohio 14	John F. Seiberling	Democratic	1970	Incumbent re-elected.	✓ John F. Seiberling (Democratic) 74.1%; James E. Houston (Republican) 24.3%; Steven P. Meyer (Independent) 1.6%
Ohio 15	Chalmers Wylie	Republican	1966	Incumbent re-elected.	✓ Chalmers Wylie (Republican) 65.5%; Manley L. McGee (Republican) 34.5%
Ohio 16	Ralph Regula	Republican	1972	Incumbent re-elected.	✓ Ralph Regula (Republican) 66.8%; John G. Freedom (Democratic) 32.0%; Harold B. Festerly (American) 1.1%; Mark F. Vanvoorhis (Workers) 0.04%
Ohio 17	John M. Ashbrook	Republican	1960	Incumbent re-elected.	✓ John M. Ashbrook (Republican) 56.8%; John C. McDonald (Democratic) 43.2%
Ohio 18	Wayne Hays	Democratic	1948	Incumbent resigned. Democratic hold.	✓ Douglas Applegate (Democratic) 62.9%; Ralph R. McCoy (Republican) 24.6%; William Crabbe (Independent) 11.6%; John Dwight Bashline (Independent) 0.9%
Ohio 19	Charles J. Carney	Democratic	1970	Incumbent re-elected.	✓ Charles J. Carney (Democratic) 50.2%; Jack C. Hunter (Republican) 47.9%; Kenneth Zurbrugg (Independent) 1.3%; Karl T. Untch (Independent) 0.6%
Ohio 20	James V. Stanton	Democratic	1970	Incumbent retired to run for U.S. senator. Democratic hold.	✓ Mary Rose Oakar (Democratic) 81.0%; Raymond J. Grabow (Independent) 16.9%; Theodore Held III (Independent) 2.2%
Ohio 21	Louis Stokes	Democratic	1968	Incumbent re-elected.	✓ Louis Stokes (Democratic) 83.8%; Barbara Sparks (Republican) 11.3%; Anthony R. Curry (Independent) 4.8%
Ohio 22	Charles Vanik	Democratic	1954	Incumbent re-elected.	✓ Charles Vanik (Democratic) 72.7%; Harry A. Hanna (Republican) 24.2%; Thomas W. Lippitt (American) 3.1%
Ohio 23	Ronald M. Mottl	Democratic	1974	Incumbent re-elected.	✓ Ronald M. Mottl (Democratic) 73.2%; Michael T. Scanlon (Republican) 26.8%

== Oklahoma ==
District	Incumbent			This race	
District	Member	Party	First elected	Results	Candidates
Oklahoma 1	James R. Jones	Democratic	1972	Incumbent re-elected.	✓ James R. Jones (Democratic) 54.0%; Jim Inhofe (Republican) 45.1%; W. D. Mackintosh (Independent) 0.9%
Oklahoma 2	Ted Risenhoover	Democratic	1974	Incumbent re-elected.	✓ Ted Risenhoover (Democratic) 54.0%; Bud Stewart (Republican) 46.0%
Oklahoma 3	Carl Albert	Democratic	1946	Incumbent retired. Democratic hold.	✓ Wes Watkins (Democratic) 82.0%; Gerald Beasley Jr. (Republican) 17.2%; Jack C. Finley (Independent) 0.8%
Oklahoma 4	Tom Steed	Democratic	1948	Incumbent re-elected.	✓ Tom Steed (Democratic) 74.9%; M. C. Stanley (Republican) 22.0%; Paul E. Trent (Independent) 3.1%
Oklahoma 5	John Jarman	Republican	1950	Incumbent retired. Republican hold.	✓ Mickey Edwards (Republican) 49.9%; Tom Dunlap (Democratic) 47.4%; Max Wolfley (Independent) 0.9%; Donald F. Parker (Independent) 0.9%; Jim Smith (Independent) 0.6%; Robert O. Buchanan (Independent) 0.5%
Oklahoma 6	Glenn English	Democratic	1974	Incumbent re-elected.	✓ Glenn English (Democratic) 71.1%; Carol McCurley (Republican) 28.9%

== Oregon ==
District	Incumbent			This race	
District	Member	Party	First elected	Results	Candidates
Oregon 1	Les AuCoin	Democratic	1974	Incumbent re-elected.	✓ Les AuCoin (Democratic) 58.7%; Phil Bladine (Republican) 41.3%
Oregon 2	Al Ullman	Democratic	1956	Incumbent re-elected.	✓ Al Ullman (Democratic) 72.0%; Thomas H. Mercer (Republican) 28.0%
Oregon 3	Robert B. Duncan	Democratic	1962; 1966 (retired); 1974	Incumbent re-elected.	✓ Robert B. Duncan (Democratic) 84.0%; Martin Simon (Independent) 16.0%
Oregon 4	Jim Weaver	Democratic	1974	Incumbent re-elected.	✓ Jim Weaver (Democratic) 50.0%; Jerry Lausmann (Republican) 35.1%; Jim Howard (Independent) 9.0%; Theodora Nathan (Independent) 5.8%

== Pennsylvania ==
District	Incumbent			This race	
District	Member	Party	First elected	Results	Candidates
Pennsylvania 1	William A. Barrett	Democratic	1944; 1946 (defeated); 1948	Incumbent died. Democratic hold.	✓ Michael Myers (Democratic) 73.5%; Samuel N. Fanelli (Republican) 25.2%; Clare Fraenzl (Socialist Workers) 0.8%; Henry D. Moss (Labor) 0.4%
Pennsylvania 2	Robert N. C. Nix Sr.	Democratic	1958	Incumbent re-elected.	✓ Robert N. C. Nix Sr. (Democratic) 73.5%; Jesse W. Woods Jr. (Republican) 25.4%; Tony Austin (Socialist Workers) 0.7%; Willie Thomas (Independent Conservative) 0.2%; Dennis Grant (Workers) 0.1%
Pennsylvania 3	William J. Green III	Democratic	1964	Incumbent retired to run for U.S. senator. Democratic hold.	✓ Raymond Lederer (Democratic) 73.2%; Terence J. Schade (Republican) 26.3%; Steven S. Douglas (Labor) 0.5%
Pennsylvania 4	Joshua Eilberg	Democratic	1966	Incumbent re-elected.	✓ Joshua Eilberg (Democratic) 67.5%; James E. Mugford (Republican) 32.5%
Pennsylvania 5	Richard T. Schulze	Republican	1974	Incumbent re-elected.	✓ Richard T. Schulze (Republican) 59.5%; Anthony Campolo (Democratic) 40.5%
Pennsylvania 6	Gus Yatron	Democratic	1968	Incumbent re-elected.	✓ Gus Yatron (Democratic) 73.8%; Stephen Postupack (Republican) 25.5%; Garland M. Fisher (Const) 0.7%
Pennsylvania 7	Robert W. Edgar	Democratic	1974	Incumbent re-elected.	✓ Robert W. Edgar (Democratic) 54.1%; John M. Kenney (Republican) 45.9%; Samuel Cinger (Labor) 0.06%
Pennsylvania 8	Edward G. Biester Jr.	Republican	1966	Incumbent retired. Democratic gain.	✓ Peter H. Kostmayer (Democratic) 49.5%; John S. Renninger (Republican) 48.8%; Robert B. Graham (Const) 1.7%
Pennsylvania 9	Bud Shuster	Republican	1972	Incumbent re-elected.	✓ Bud Shuster (Republican); Unopposed
Pennsylvania 10	Joseph M. McDade	Republican	1962	Incumbent re-elected.	✓ Joseph M. McDade (Republican) 62.6%; Edward Mitchell (Democratic) 37.4%
Pennsylvania 11	Dan Flood	Democratic	1944; 1946 (defeated); 1948; 1952 (defeated); 1954	Incumbent re-elected.	✓ Dan Flood (Democratic) 70.8%; Howard G. Williams (Republican) 29.2%
Pennsylvania 12	John Murtha	Democratic	1974	Incumbent re-elected.	✓ John Murtha (Democratic) 67.7%; Theodore L. Humes (Republican) 32.3%
Pennsylvania 13	Lawrence Coughlin	Republican	1968	Incumbent re-elected.	✓ Lawrence Coughlin (Republican) 63.4%; Gertrude Strick (Democratic) 36.6%
Pennsylvania 14	William S. Moorhead	Democratic	1958	Incumbent re-elected.	✓ William S. Moorhead (Democratic) 71.7%; John F. Bradley (Republican) 27.1%; Carla M. Hoag (Socialist Workers) 0.9%; Scott Brody (Labor) 0.3%
Pennsylvania 15	Fred B. Rooney	Democratic	1963	Incumbent re-elected.	✓ Fred B. Rooney (Democratic) 65.2%; Alice B. Sivulich (Republican) 34.5%; Mary Jane Coates (Labor) 0.3%
Pennsylvania 16	Edwin D. Eshleman	Republican	1966	Incumbent retired. Republican hold.	✓ Robert Smith Walker (Republican) 62.3%; Michael J. Minney (Democratic) 37.0%; Richard A. Haas (Citizens) 0.5%; Martin P. Ross (Labor) 0.2%
Pennsylvania 17	Herman T. Schneebeli	Republican	1960	Incumbent retired. Democratic gain.	✓ Allen E. Ertel (Democratic) 50.7%; H. J. Hepford (Republican) 48.5%; Vernon M. Dublin (Const) 0.8%
Pennsylvania 18	John Heinz	Republican	1971	Incumbent retired to run for U.S. senator. Democratic gain.	✓ Doug Walgren (Democratic) 59.5%; Robert J. Casey (Republican) 40.5%
Pennsylvania 19	William F. Goodling	Republican	1974	Incumbent re-elected.	✓ William F. Goodling (Republican) 70.6%; Richard P. Noll (Democratic) 29.4%
Pennsylvania 20	Joseph M. Gaydos	Democratic	1968	Incumbent re-elected.	✓ Joseph M. Gaydos (Democratic) 75.0%; John P. Kostelac (Republican) 24.7%; Joseph A. Billington (Labor) 0.4%
Pennsylvania 21	John Herman Dent	Democratic	1958	Incumbent re-elected.	✓ John Herman Dent (Democratic) 59.4%; Robert H. Miller (Republican) 40.6%
Pennsylvania 22	Thomas E. Morgan	Democratic	1944	Incumbent retired. Democratic hold.	✓ Austin Murphy (Democratic) 55.3%; Roger R. Fischer (Republican) 43.9%; Arthur E. Wilson (American) 0.8%
Pennsylvania 23	Albert W. Johnson	Republican	1963	Lost re-election Democratic gain.	✓ Joseph S. Ammerman (Democratic) 56.5%; Albert W. Johnson (Republican) 43.5%
Pennsylvania 24	Joseph P. Vigorito	Democratic	1964	Lost re-election Republican gain.	✓ Marc L. Marks (Republican) 55.4%; Joseph P. Vigorito (Democratic) 43.8%; Robert Hereford (American) 0.8%
Pennsylvania 25	Gary A. Myers	Republican	1974	Incumbent re-elected.	✓ Gary A. Myers (Republican) 56.8%; Eugene V. Atkinson (Democratic) 43.2%

== Rhode Island ==
District	Incumbent			This race	
District	Member	Party	First elected	Results	Candidates
Rhode Island 1	Fernand St. Germain	Democratic	1960	Incumbent re-elected.	✓ Fernand St. Germain (Democratic) 62.4%; John J. Slocum Jr. (Republican) 36.4%; Ann M. Morrissey (Independent) 1.2%
Rhode Island 2	Edward Beard	Democratic	1974	Incumbent re-elected.	✓ Edward Beard (Democratic) 76.5%; Thomas V. Iannitti (Republican) 22.5%; Pasquale F. Pacia (Independent) 1.0%

== South Carolina ==
District	Incumbent			This race	
District	Member	Party	First elected	Results	Candidates
South Carolina 1	Mendel Jackson Davis	Democratic	1971	Incumbent re-elected.	✓ Mendel Jackson Davis (Democratic) 68.9%; Lonnie Rowell (Republican) 31.1%
South Carolina 2	Floyd Spence	Republican	1970	Incumbent re-elected.	✓ Floyd Spence (Republican) 57.5%; Clyde Burns Livingston (Democratic) 41.8%; John O'Neal (Independent) 0.7%
South Carolina 3	Butler Derrick	Democratic	1974	Incumbent re-elected.	✓ Butler Derrick (Democratic); Unopposed
South Carolina 4	James Mann	Democratic	1968	Incumbent re-elected.	✓ James Mann (Democratic) 73.6%; Robert L. Watkins (Republican) 26.4%
South Carolina 5	Kenneth Lamar Holland	Democratic	1974	Incumbent re-elected.	✓ Kenneth Lamar Holland (Democratic) 51.4%; Bobby Richardson (Republican) 48.3%; Harold Hough (Independent) 0.2%
South Carolina 6	John Jenrette	Democratic	1974	Incumbent re-elected.	✓ John Jenrette (Democratic) 55.5%; Edward Lunn Young (Republican) 44.0%; Clarence C. Dillingham (Independent) 0.5%

== South Dakota ==
District	Incumbent			This race	
District	Member	Party	First elected	Results	Candidates
South Dakota 1	Larry Pressler	Republican	1974	Incumbent re-elected.	✓ Larry Pressler (Republican) 79.8%; James V. Guffey (Democratic) 19.4%; Donald Stevens (Independent) 0.8%
South Dakota 2	James Abdnor	Republican	1972	Incumbent re-elected.	✓ James Abdnor (Republican) 69.9%; Grace Mickelson (Democratic) 30.1%

== Tennessee ==
District	Incumbent			This race	
District	Member	Party	First elected	Results	Candidates
Tennessee 1	Jimmy Quillen	Republican	1962	Incumbent re-elected.	✓ Jimmy Quillen (Republican) 58.0%; Lloyd Blevins (Democratic) 41.2%; Robert Joseph Bobic (Independent) 0.6%; Mary S. Joyner (Independent) 0.3%
Tennessee 2	John Duncan Sr.	Republican	1964	Incumbent re-elected.	✓ John Duncan Sr. (Republican) 62.8%; Mike Rowland (Democratic) 37.2%
Tennessee 3	Marilyn Lloyd	Democratic	1974	Incumbent re-elected.	✓ Marilyn Lloyd (Democratic) 67.5%; LaMar Baker (Republican) 31.1%; Tom Dover (American) 1.3%; Wendell H. Hill Jr. (Libertarian) 0.1%
Tennessee 4	Joe L. Evins	Democratic	1946	Incumbent retired. Democratic hold.	✓ Al Gore (Democratic) 94.0%; William H. McGlamery (Independent) 6.0%
Tennessee 5	Clifford Allen	Democratic	1975	Incumbent re-elected.	✓ Clifford Allen (Democratic) 92.4%; Roger Bissell (Independent) 7.6%
Tennessee 6	Robin Beard	Republican	1972	Incumbent re-elected.	✓ Robin Beard (Republican) 64.4%; Ross Bass (Democratic) 35.6%
Tennessee 7	Ed Jones	Democratic	1969	Incumbent re-elected.	✓ Ed Jones (Democratic); Unopposed
Tennessee 8	Harold Ford Sr.	Democratic	1974	Incumbent re-elected.	✓ Harold Ford Sr. (Democratic) 60.7%; Andy Allissandratos (Republican) 38.5%; Mark F. Flanagan (Independent) 0.9%

== Texas ==
District	Incumbent			This race	
District	Member	Party	First elected	Results	Candidates
Texas 1	Sam B. Hall Jr.	Democratic	1976	Incumbent re-elected.	✓ Sam B. Hall Jr. (Democratic) 83.7%; James Hogan (Republican) 16.3%
Texas 2	Charles Wilson	Democratic	1972	Incumbent re-elected.	✓ Charles Wilson (Democratic) 95.0%; James William Doyle III (American) 5.0%
Texas 3	James M. Collins	Republican	1968	Incumbent re-elected.	✓ James M. Collins (Republican) 74.0%; Les Shackelford Jr. (Democratic) 26.0%
Texas 4	Ray Roberts	Democratic	1962	Incumbent re-elected.	✓ Ray Roberts (Democratic) 62.7%; Frank S. Glenn (Republican) 37.3%
Texas 5	Alan Steelman	Republican	1972	Incumbent retired to run for U.S. senator. Democratic gain.	✓ Jim Mattox (Democratic) 54.0%; Nancy Judy (Republican) 44.6%; Sam McDonnell (American) 1.5%
Texas 6	Olin E. Teague	Democratic	1946	Incumbent re-elected.	✓ Olin E. Teague (Democratic) 65.9%; Wes Mowery (Republican) 33.4%; Harley L. Pinon (American) 0.7%
Texas 7	Bill Archer	Republican	1970	Incumbent re-elected.	✓ Bill Archer (Republican); Unopposed
Texas 8	Robert C. Eckhardt	Democratic	1966	Incumbent re-elected.	✓ Robert C. Eckhardt (Democratic) 60.7%; Nick Gearhart (Republican) 39.2%; Gene Lantz (Socialist Workers) 0.1%
Texas 9	Jack Brooks	Democratic	1952	Incumbent re-elected.	✓ Jack Brooks (Democratic); Unopposed
Texas 10	J. J. Pickle	Democratic	1963	Incumbent re-elected.	✓ J. J. Pickle (Democratic) 76.8%; Paul McClure (Republican) 23.2%
Texas 11	William R. Poage	Democratic	1936	Incumbent re-elected.	✓ William R. Poage (Democratic) 57.4%; Jack Burgess (Republican) 42.6%
Texas 12	Jim Wright	Democratic	1954	Incumbent re-elected.	✓ Jim Wright (Democratic) 75.8%; W. R. Durham (Republican) 23.8%; Larry Kutchinski (American) 0.4%
Texas 13	Jack Hightower	Democratic	1974	Incumbent re-elected.	✓ Jack Hightower (Democratic) 59.3%; Robert Price (Republican) 40.4%; William K. Hathcock (American) 0.3%
Texas 14	John Andrew Young	Democratic	1956	Incumbent re-elected.	✓ John Andrew Young (Democratic) 61.4%; L. Dean Holford (Republican) 38.6%
Texas 15	Kika de la Garza	Democratic	1964	Incumbent re-elected.	✓ Kika de la Garza (Democratic) 74.4%; Robert Lendol McDonald (Republican) 25.6%
Texas 16	Richard Crawford White	Democratic	1964	Incumbent re-elected.	✓ Richard Crawford White (Democratic) 57.8%; Vic Shackelford (Republican) 42.2%
Texas 17	Omar Burleson	Democratic	1946	Incumbent re-elected.	✓ Omar Burleson (Democratic); Unopposed
Texas 18	Barbara Jordan	Democratic	1972	Incumbent re-elected.	✓ Barbara Jordan (Democratic) 85.5%; Sam H. Wright (Republican) 14.0%; Sylvia Zapata (Socialist Workers) 0.5%
Texas 19	George H. Mahon	Democratic	1934	Incumbent re-elected.	✓ George H. Mahon (Democratic) 54.6%; Jim Reese (Republican) 45.4%
Texas 20	Henry B. González	Democratic	1961	Incumbent re-elected.	✓ Henry B. González (Democratic); Unopposed
Texas 21	Bob Krueger	Democratic	1974	Incumbent re-elected.	✓ Bob Krueger (Democratic) 71.0%; Bobby A. Locke (Republican) 26.7%; Ramon E. Carrillo (La Raza Unida) 1.2%; Ed Gallion (American) 1.0%
Texas 22	Ron Paul	Republican	April 3, 1976 (Special)	Lost re-election Democratic gain.	✓ Robert Gammage (Democratic) 50.1%; Ron Paul (Republican) 49.9%
Texas 23	Abraham Kazen	Democratic	1966	Incumbent re-elected.	✓ Abraham Kazen (Democratic); Unopposed
Texas 24	Dale Milford	Democratic	1972	Incumbent re-elected.	✓ Dale Milford (Democratic) 63.4%; Leo Berman (Republican) 36.1%; Earl W. Armstrong (American) 0.5%

== Utah ==
District	Incumbent			This race	
District	Member	Party	First elected	Results	Candidates
Utah 1	K. Gunn McKay	Democratic	1970	Incumbent re-elected.	✓ K. Gunn McKay (Democratic) 58.2%; Joe H. Ferguson (Republican) 39.8%; Harry B. Gerlach (American) 2.0%
Utah 2	Allan Howe	Democratic	1974	Lost re-election Republican gain.	✓ David Daniel Marriott (Republican) 52.4%; Allan Howe (Democratic) 40.1%; Daryl J. McCarty (Write-in) 7.4%

== Vermont ==
District	Incumbent			This race	
District	Member	Party	First elected	Results	Candidates
Vermont at-large	Jim Jeffords	Republican	1974	Incumbent re-elected.	✓ Jim Jeffords (Republican) 67.3%; John A. Burgess (Democratic) 32.7%

== Virginia ==
District	Incumbent			This race	
District	Member	Party	First elected	Results	Candidates
Virginia 1	Thomas N. Downing	Democratic	1958	Incumbent retired. Republican gain.	✓ Paul Trible (Republican) 48.6%; Robert E. Quinn (Democratic) 47.5%; Mary B. McClaine (Independent) 4.0%
Virginia 2	G. William Whitehurst	Republican	1968	Incumbent re-elected.	✓ G. William Whitehurst (Republican) 65.7%; Robert E. Washington (Democratic) 34.3%
Virginia 3	David E. Satterfield III	Democratic	1964	Incumbent re-elected.	✓ David E. Satterfield III (Democratic) 88.1%; Alan Robert Ogden (Independent) 11.9%
Virginia 4	Robert Daniel	Republican	1972	Incumbent re-elected.	✓ Robert Daniel (Republican) 53.0%; J. W. "Billy" O'Brien (Democratic) 47.0%
Virginia 5	Dan Daniel	Democratic	1968	Incumbent re-elected.	✓ Dan Daniel (Democratic); Unopposed
Virginia 6	M. Caldwell Butler	Republican	1972	Incumbent re-elected.	✓ M. Caldwell Butler (Republican) 62.2%; Warren D. Saunders (Independent) 37.8%
Virginia 7	J. Kenneth Robinson	Republican	1970	Incumbent re-elected.	✓ J. Kenneth Robinson (Republican) 81.8%; James B. Hutt Jr. (Independent) 18.2%
Virginia 8	Herbert Harris	Democratic	1974	Incumbent re-elected.	✓ Herbert Harris (Democratic) 51.6%; James R. Tate (Republican) 42.6%; Michael D. Cannon (Independent) 5.8%
Virginia 9	William C. Wampler	Republican	1952; 1954 (defeated); 1966	Incumbent re-elected.	✓ William C. Wampler (Republican) 57.3%; Charles J. Horne (Democratic) 42.7%
Virginia 10	Joseph L. Fisher	Democratic	1974	Incumbent re-elected.	✓ Joseph L. Fisher (Democratic) 54.7%; Vincent F. Callahan Jr. (Republican) 38.9%; E. Stanley Rittenhouse (Independent) 6.4%

== Washington ==
District	Incumbent			This race	
District	Member	Party	First elected	Results	Candidates
Washington 1	Joel Pritchard	Republican	1972	Incumbent re-elected.	✓ Joel Pritchard (Republican) 71.9%; Dave Wood (Democratic) 25.8%; Alan M. Gottlieb (Libertarian) 1.9%; Patrick Ruckert (Labor) 0.4%
Washington 2	Lloyd Meeds	Democratic	1964	Incumbent re-elected.	✓ Lloyd Meeds (Democratic) 49.3%; John Nance Garner (Republican) 49.0%; Tom Bly (Const) 0.9%; Carol Ruckert (Labor) 0.8%
Washington 3	Don Bonker	Democratic	1974	Incumbent re-elected.	✓ Don Bonker (Democratic) 70.8%; Chuck Elhart (Republican) 28.0%; David Kilber (Labor) 1.1%
Washington 4	Mike McCormack	Democratic	1970	Incumbent re-elected.	✓ Mike McCormack (Democratic) 57.8%; Dick Granger (Republican) 41.0%; Jeff W. Busby (Const) 0.8%; Ted Andromidas (Labor) 0.5%
Washington 5	Tom Foley	Democratic	1964	Incumbent re-elected.	✓ Tom Foley (Democratic) 58.0%; Duane Alton (Republican) 40.6%; D. E. Bear Sandahl (Libertarian) 0.9%; Ira Liebowitz (Labor) 0.5%
Washington 6	Floyd Hicks	Democratic	1964	Incumbent retired. Democratic hold.	✓ Norm Dicks (Democratic) 73.5%; Robert M. Reynolds (Republican) 25.3%; Michael Duane (Labor) 1.2%
Washington 7	Brock Adams	Democratic	1964	Incumbent re-elected.	✓ Brock Adams (Democratic) 73.0%; Raymond Pritchard (Republican) 25.4%; Gene Goosman (Const) 0.9%; Marianna Wertz (Labor) 0.7%

== West Virginia ==
District	Incumbent			This race	
District	Member	Party	First elected	Results	Candidates
West Virginia 1	Bob Mollohan	Democratic	1952; 1956 (retired); 1968	Incumbent re-elected.	✓ Bob Mollohan (Democratic) 58.0%; John F. McCuskey (Republican) 42.0%
West Virginia 2	Harley Orrin Staggers	Democratic	1948	Incumbent re-elected.	✓ Harley Orrin Staggers (Democratic) 73.6%; Jim Sloan (Republican) 26.4%
West Virginia 3	John M. Slack Jr.	Democratic	1958	Incumbent re-elected.	✓ John M. Slack Jr. (Democratic); Unopposed
West Virginia 4	Ken Hechler	Democratic	1958	Incumbent retired to run for governor. New member elected. Democratic hold.	✓ Nick Rahall (Democratic) 45.6%; Ken Hechler (Write-in) 36.6%; Steve Goodman (Republican) 17.8%

== Wisconsin ==
District	Incumbent			This race	
District	Member	Party	First elected	Results	Candidates
Wisconsin 1	Les Aspin	Democratic	1970	Incumbent re-elected.	✓ Les Aspin (Democratic) 64.9%; William W. Petrie (Republican) 34.0%; Eugene R. Zimmerman (American) 1.1%
Wisconsin 2	Robert Kastenmeier	Democratic	1958	Incumbent re-elected.	✓ Robert Kastenmeier (Democratic) 65.6%; Elizabeth T. Miller (Republican) 34.4%
Wisconsin 3	Alvin Baldus	Democratic	1974	Incumbent re-elected.	✓ Alvin Baldus (Democratic) 58.1%; Adolf L. Gundersen (Republican) 41.9%
Wisconsin 4	Clement J. Zablocki	Democratic	1948	Incumbent re-elected.	✓ Clement J. Zablocki (Democratic); Unopposed
Wisconsin 5	Henry S. Reuss	Democratic	1954	Incumbent re-elected.	✓ Henry S. Reuss (Democratic) 77.8%; Robert L. Hicks (Republican) 21.0%; R. Julian Chapman (Independent) 0.9%; John E. Sokoly (Independent) 0.3%
Wisconsin 6	William A. Steiger	Republican	1966	Incumbent re-elected.	✓ William A. Steiger (Republican) 63.4%; Joseph C. Smith (Democratic) 36.6%
Wisconsin 7	Dave Obey	Democratic	1969	Incumbent re-elected.	✓ Dave Obey (Democratic) 73.3%; Frank A. Savino (Republican) 26.1%; George Olishkewych (American) 0.7%
Wisconsin 8	Robert John Cornell	Democratic	1974	Incumbent re-elected.	✓ Robert John Cornell (Democratic) 50.9%; Harold Vernon Froehlich (Republican) 46.9%; Donald D. Hoeft (American) 2.2%
Wisconsin 9	Bob Kasten	Republican	1974	Incumbent re-elected.	✓ Bob Kasten (Republican) 65.9%; Lynn M. McDonald (Democratic) 34.1%

== Wyoming ==
District	Incumbent			This race	
District	Member	Party	First elected	Results	Candidates
Wyoming at-large	Teno Roncalio	Democratic	1964; 1966 (retired); 1970	Incumbent re-elected.	✓ Teno Roncalio (Democratic) 56.4%; Larry Hart (Republican) 43.6%

== See also ==
- 1976 United States elections
  - 1976 United States gubernatorial elections
  - 1976 United States presidential election
  - 1976 United States Senate elections
- 94th United States Congress
- 95th United States Congress

== Works cited ==
- Abramson, Paul; Aldrich, John; Rohde, David (1995). Change and Continuity in the 1992 Elections. CQ Press. ISBN 0871878399.
- "Reagan Says G.O.P. Needs New Name and New Support". The Washington Post. November 20, 1976. p. 13.
- "Reagan Suggests GOP should R.I.P.". The Washington Post. November 19, 1976. p. 16.
