= Weston E. Vivian =

American politician (1924–2020)

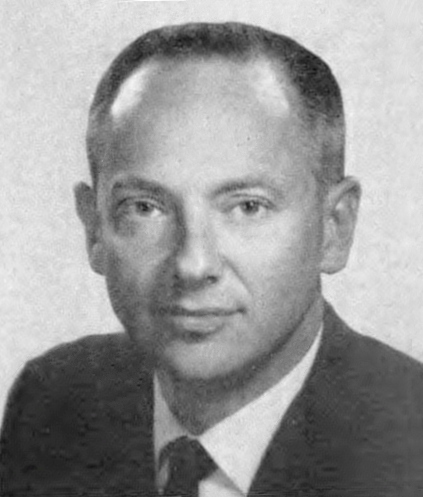

Member of the U.S. House of Representatives from Michigan's 2nd district
- In office January 3, 1965 – January 3, 1967
- Preceded by: George Meader
- Succeeded by: Marvin L. Esch

Personal details
- Born: Weston Edward Vivian; October 25, 1924 Pushthrough, Dominion of Newfoundland
- Died: December 4, 2020 (aged 96) Ann Arbor, Michigan, U.S.
- Party: Democratic
- Education: Union College; Massachusetts Institute of Technology; University of Michigan at Ann Arbor
- Occupation: Engineer

Weston Edward "Wes" Vivian (October 25, 1924 – December 4, 2020) was an American World War II veteran, electrical engineer and politician from the state of Michigan. He served one term in the United States House of Representatives from 1965 to 1967.

== Biography ==
Vivian was born in Pushthrough in the Dominion of Newfoundland, and moved to the United States with his parents on September 5, 1929, settling in Cranston, Rhode Island where he attended school. He served in the United States Navy as an enlisted man and officer from 1943 to 1946.

He received a B.S. at Union College, Schenectady, New York, in 1945, and a Master of Science at the Massachusetts Institute of Technology, Cambridge in 1949, and a Doctor of Philosophy at the University of Michigan, Ann Arbor in 1959. He was a candidate for city council of Ann Arbor from 1958 to 1959 and a research engineer and lecturer at the University of Michigan from 1951 to 1959. He was chairman of the Ann Arbor City Democratic Committee from 1959 to 1960.

=== Tenure in Congress ===
In 1964, Vivian was elected as a Democrat from Michigan's 2nd congressional district to the 89th United States Congress, serving from January 3, 1965, to January 3, 1967. He was known as one of the Michigan Five Fluke Freshmen and was an unsuccessful candidate for reelection in 1966 to the Ninetieth Congress, being defeated by then-state Representative Marvin L. Esch. Vivian remains the last Democrat to represent the 2nd district, and the only one since 1935.

=== Later career ===
Vivian later served as vice president of Vicom Industries, Inc. in Ann Arbor and became a lecturer at the Institute of Public Policy Studies, University of Michigan. He also became a telecommunications consultant. He was a Unitarian and a member of the NAACP.

=== Death ===
He died in Ann Arbor, Michigan on December 4, 2020, at the age of 96.

U.S. House of Representatives
Preceded by George Meader	United States Representative for the 2nd congressional district of Michigan; 1965 – 1967	Succeeded by Marvin L. Esch
