= George Meader =

American politician (1907–1994)

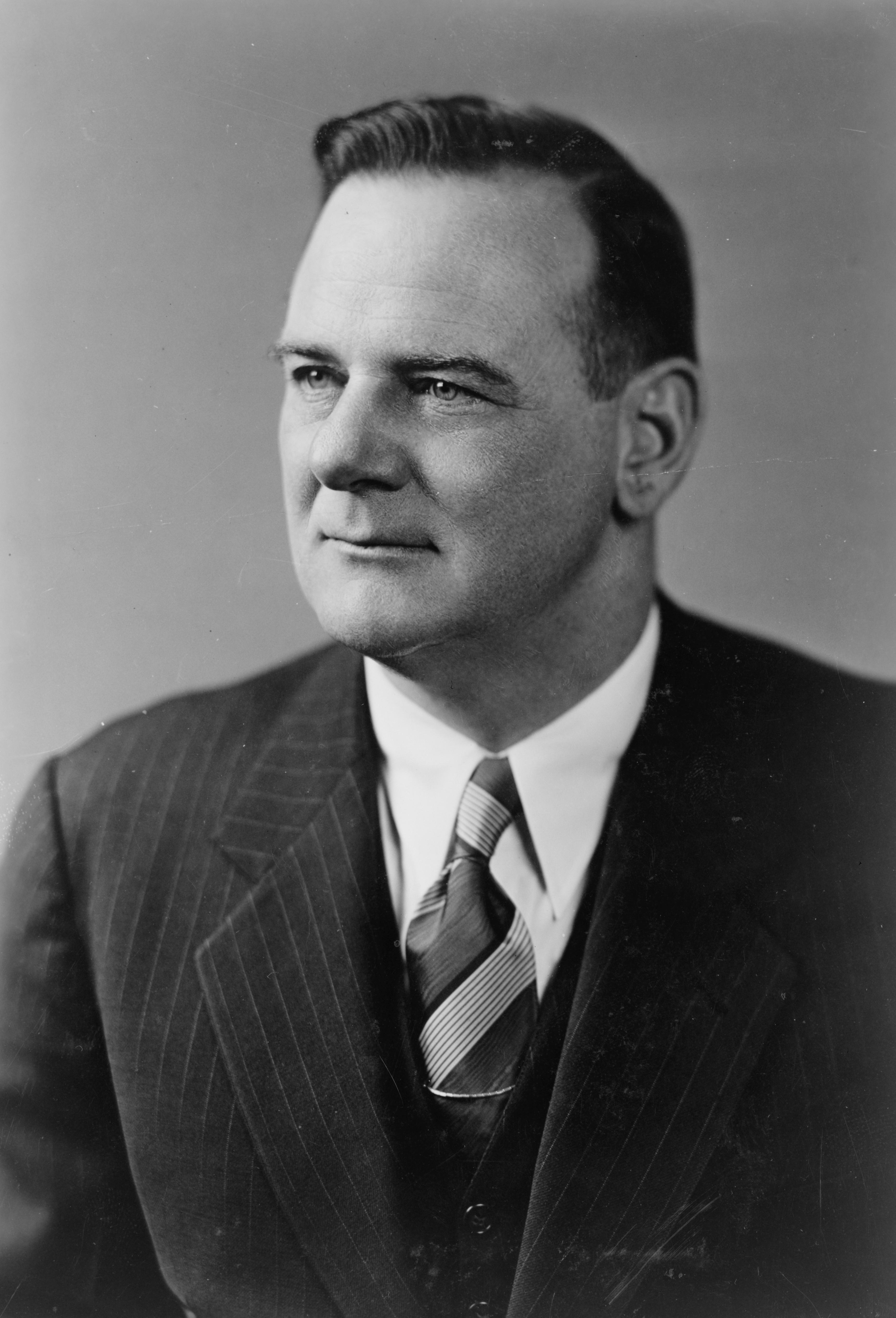

Member of the U.S. House of Representatives from Michigan's 2nd district
- In office January 3, 1951 – January 3, 1965
- Preceded by: Earl C. Michener
- Succeeded by: Weston E. Vivian

Personal details
- Born: September 13, 1907 Benton Harbor, Michigan
- Died: October 15, 1994 (aged 87) Ann Arbor, Michigan
- Resting place: Forest Hill Cemetery; Ann Arbor, Michigan, U.S.
- Party: Republican
- Education: Ohio Wesleyan University
- Alma mater: University of Michigan (A.B.); University of Michigan Law School (J.D.)
- Occupation: Lawyer; politician

George Meader (September 13, 1907 – October 15, 1994), was a Republican politician from the US state of Michigan.

== Early life ==
Meader was born on September 13, 1907, in Benton Harbor, Michigan, and attended the public schools of various cities in Michigan. He was a student at Ohio Wesleyan University from 1923 to 1925 and graduated from the University of Michigan, A.B. in 1927 and from the University of Michigan Law School, J.D. in 1931. He was admitted to the bar in 1932.

== Career ==
Meader commenced the practice of law in Ann Arbor. He served as prosecuting attorney of Washtenaw County from 1941 to 1943. He was assistant counsel to the United States Senate special committee investigating the national defense program from July 1, 1943, to October 1, 1945, and chief counsel from October 1, 1945, to July 15, 1947. He practiced law from 1948 to 1950 and was chief counsel of the United States Senate Banking and Currency subcommittee investigating the Reconstruction Finance Corporation in 1950.

In 1948, Meader made an unsuccessful run to defeat incumbent U.S. Representative Earl C. Michener in the Republican primary election. In 1950, after Michener retired, Meader won both the Republican primary and the general election to be elected from Michigan's 2nd congressional district to the 82nd United States Congress. He was subsequently re-elected to the six succeeding Congresses, serving from January 3, 1951, to January 3, 1965. Meader voted in favor of the Civil Rights Act of 1957 and the 24th Amendment to the U.S. Constitution, but voted against the Civil Rights Acts of 1960 and 1964.

In 1964, Meader lost the general election to Democrat Weston E. Vivian. In 1966, he lost in the Republican primary to Marvin L. Esch, who went on to defeat Vivian in the general election. He then served as associate counsel on the Joint Committee on the Organization of the Congress from March 1965 to April 1967 and chief counsel until September 1968.

Meader resumed the private practice of law and served as staff counsel of the Joint Committee on Congressional Operations from 1971 to 1975. He was a resident of Washington, D.C., until his death. He was a member of Kiwanis.

== Personal life ==
Meader died on October 15, 1994, in Ann Arbor. He was buried at Forest Hill Cemetery in Ann Arbor.

U.S. House of Representatives
Preceded by Earl C. Michener	United States Representative for the 2nd congressional district of Michigan; 1951–1965	Succeeded by Weston E. Vivian
