= Marvin L. Esch =

American politician

Marvin Leonel Esch
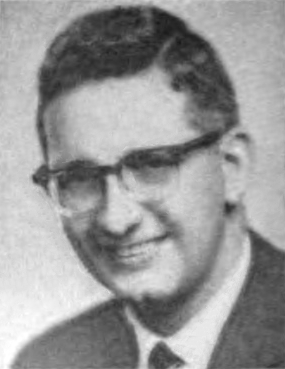

Member of the U.S. House of Representatives from Michigan's 2nd district
- In office January 3, 1967 – January 3, 1977
- Preceded by: Weston E. Vivian
- Succeeded by: Carl Pursell

Member of the Michigan House of Representatives from the 53rd district
- In office 1965–1966
- Preceded by: District established
- Succeeded by: Raymond J. Smit

Personal details
- Born: August 4, 1927 Flinton, Pennsylvania, U.S.
- Died: June 19, 2010 (aged 82) Ann Arbor, Michigan, U.S.
- Party: Republican
- Spouse: Olga (m. 1950)
- Children: 3
- Education: University of Michigan

Marvin Leonel Esch (August 4, 1927 – June 19, 2010) was an American politician from the U.S. state of Michigan and a member of the Republican Party. He served in the U.S. House of Representatives from 1967 to 1977 before unsuccessfully seeking a seat in the United States Senate in the 1976 election. Following his political career, Esch became active in business and political activism, becoming director of public affairs for the U.S. Steel Corporation and director of programs and seminars for the American Enterprise Institute.

== Biography ==
Esch was born in Flinton in Cambria County, Pennsylvania. He received his secondary education in Akron, Ohio, and Jackson, Michigan. He attended the University of Michigan at Ann Arbor, earning an A.B. in 1950, an M.A. in 1951, and a Ph.D. in 1957. He served in the U.S. Maritime Service and the United States Army. He was a member of the faculty at Wayne State University, Detroit, Michigan and a member of the Michigan State House of Representatives, where he represented the 53rd district, from 1965 to 1966.

=== Political activity ===
In 1966, Esch defeated former U.S. Representative George Meader in the Republican primary elections for Michigan's 2nd congressional district. He went on to defeat incumbent Democrat Wes E. Vivian, one of the "Five Fluke Freshmen", in the general election to be elected to the 90th United States Congress. He was re-elected to the four succeeding Congresses, serving from January 3, 1967 to January 3, 1977. He was not a candidate for reelection to the Ninety-fifth Congress in 1976, but was an unsuccessful candidate for election to the United States Senate, losing in the general election to Democrat Donald W. Riegle, Jr. He won 47% of the vote in that race.

=== Post-political career ===
He was director of public affairs for the U.S. Steel Corporation from 1977 to 1980, the director of programs and seminars for the American Enterprise Institute from 1981 to 1987, and a private advocate. He was an emeritus trustee of the John F. Kennedy Center for the Performing Arts. He was a resident of Ann Arbor, Michigan.

U.S. House of Representatives
Preceded by Weston E. Vivian	Member of the U.S. House of Representatives from Michigan's 2nd congressional district 1967–1977	Succeeded by Carl D. Pursell
Party political offices
Preceded by Lenore Romney	Republican nominee for United States Senator from Michigan (Class 1); 1976	Succeeded by Philip Ruppe
