= Jerry Lausmann =

- Born: March 30, 1930; Portland, Oregon, United States
- Died: January 6, 2012 (aged 81); Medford, Oregon, United States

Jerry Stewart Lausmann (March 3, 1930 – January 6, 2012), was the second longest-serving mayor of Medford, Oregon.

== Early life ==
Jerry Stewart Lausmann was born March 3, 1930, in Portland, Oregon. He was adopted by Anton and Grace Lausmann. When he was 12, the family moved to Medford, Oregon, where Anton started a sawmill. He graduated from Medford High in 1948, and spent three years in the U.S. Navy before graduating from Oregon State University. He also attended St. Mary's College in Winona, Minnesota.

Lausmann married his first wife Sally Moffitt on 12/27/1951, but they divorced in 1953. He married Catherine Kennedy in 1955. His next marriage was to a woman named Marion and they divorced in 1963. Lausmann married Donnis O. Briesath on June 5, 1965, in Winona County, Minnesota.

Jerry took over his father's lumber company after his father was unable to run it, and the company eventually diversified into real estate. He invented the Smokeless Burner, and held three patents for it in Canada, Japan, and the United States.

Jerry was also an occasional member of his father Anton's musical group, Lausmann's Lousy Loggers Band.

His four children were Ann Lausmann-Istel, Tony Lausmann, Craig Lausmann, and Sharon Smale-Lausmann. These children were all born prior to his marriage to Donnis.

== Politics ==
Lausmann ran for Congress twice unsuccessfully in the 1970s. He was elected mayor of Medford in 1986. He was mayor of Medford for six consecutive 2-year terms, and was the second longest-serving mayor the history of the city. He was the mayor of Medford until 1998. In 1999, he was chosen as the "Citizen of the Year" by the Medford Chamber of Commerce.

Lausmann died on January 6, 2012, at Rogue Valley Manor, where he lived with Donnis since spring 2011. He is entombed in the Medford IOOF Cemetery mausoleum.
