= 1976 United States Senate election in Michigan =

- November 2, 1976
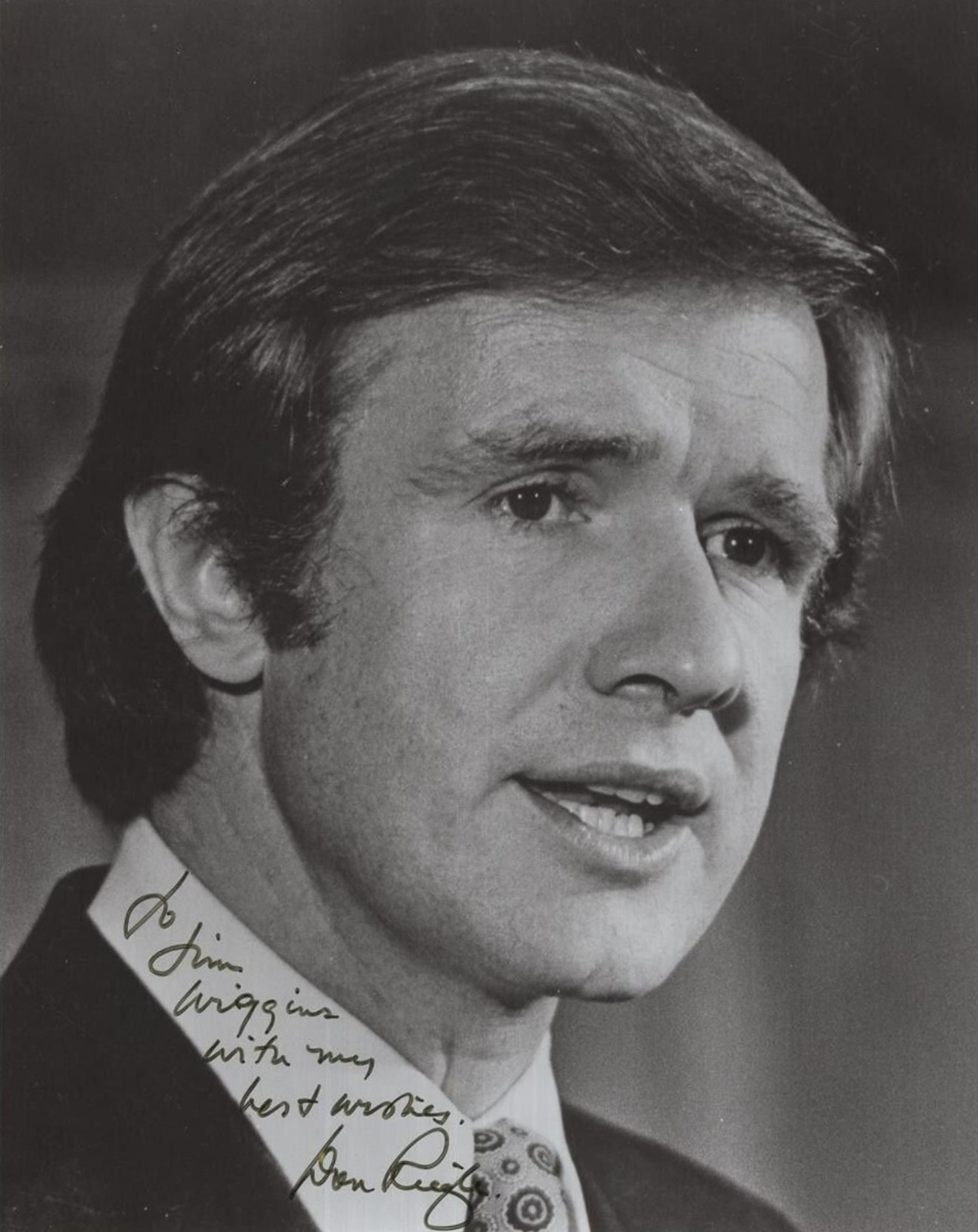

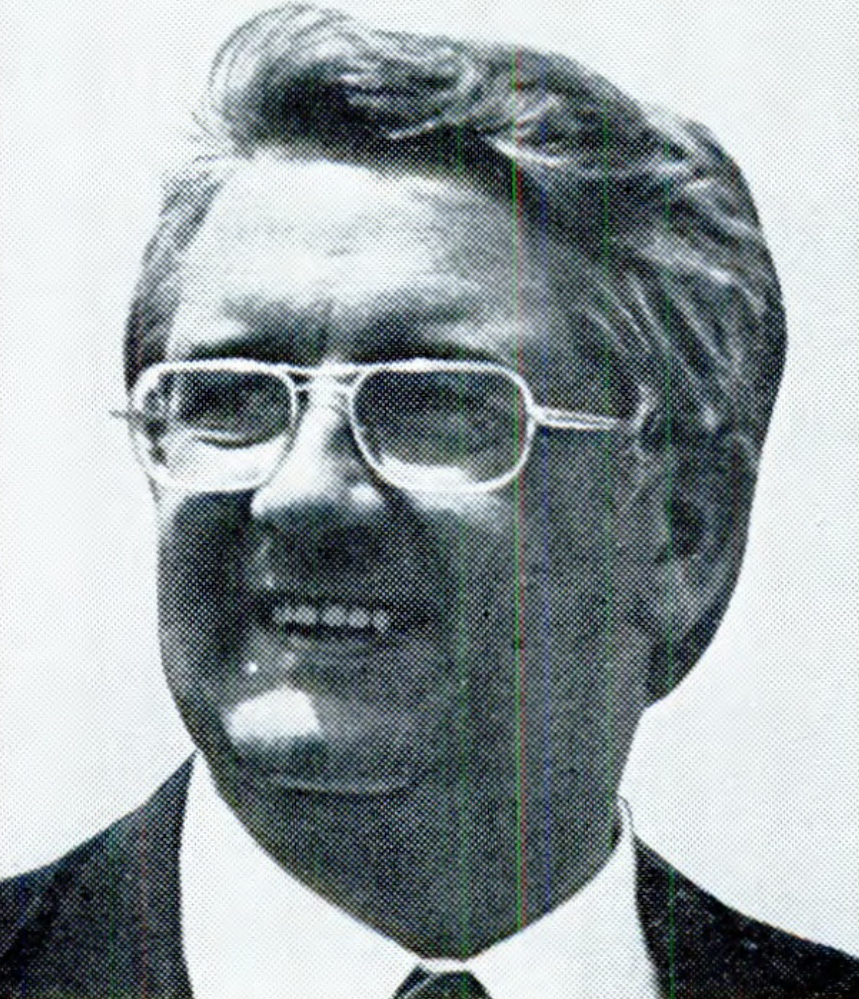
| Nominee | Don Riegle | Marvin Esch |
| Party | Democratic | Republican |
| Popular vote | 1,831,031 | 1,635,087 |
| Percentage | 52.46% | 46.85% |
- County results Riegle: 40–50% 50–60% 60–70% Esch: 40–50% 50–60% 60–70% 70–80%
U.S. senator before election
Philip Hart
Democratic
Elected U.S. Senator
Don Riegle
Democratic

The 1976 United States Senate election in Michigan took place on November 2, 1976. Incumbent Democratic U.S. Senator Philip Hart decided to retire instead of seeking a fourth term because he had terminal cancer. Republican turned Democrat Representative Donald Riegle won the open seat, keeping it in Democrats' hands despite Gerald Ford's victory in the concurrent presidential election.

== Democratic primary ==
=== Candidates ===
- Richard H. Austin, Michigan Secretary of State
- James L. Elsman
- James G. O'Hara, U.S. Representative from Utica
- Donald Riegle, U.S. Representative from Flint

=== Results ===
1976 Democratic U.S. Senate primary
| Party | Candidate | Votes | % |
|---|---|---|---|
| Democratic | Donald Riegle | 325,705 | 44.31% |
| Democratic | Richard H. Austin | 208,310 | 28.34% |
| Democratic | James G. O'Hara | 170,473 | 23.19% |
| Democratic | James L. Elsman | 30,655 | 4.17% |
| Total votes | | 735,143 | 100.00% |

== Republican primary ==
=== Candidates ===
- Deane Baker
- Thomas E. Brennan, former Justice of the Michigan Supreme Court
- Marvin L. Esch, U.S. Representative from Ann Arbor
- Robert J. Huber, former U.S. Representative from Troy and candidate for U.S. Senate in 1970

=== Results ===
1976 Republican U.S. Senate primary
| Party | Candidate | Votes | % |
|---|---|---|---|
| Republican | Marvin L. Esch | 209,250 | 44.23% |
| Republican | Thomas E. Brennan | 129,917 | 27.46% |
| Republican | Robert J. Huber | 82,092 | 17.35% |
| Republican | Deane Baker | 51,852 | 10.96% |
| Total votes | | 473,111 | 100.00% |

== General election ==
=== Results ===
General election results
| Party | Candidate | Votes | % | ±% |
|---|---|---|---|---|
| Democratic | Don Riegle | 1,831,031 | 52.46% | ▼14.38 |
| Republican | Marvin Esch | 1,635,087 | 46.85% | ▲13.96 |
| Libertarian | Bette Jane Erwin | 8,842 | 0.25% | N/A |
| Human Rights | Theodore G. Albert | 7,281 | 0.21% | N/A |
| Socialist Workers | Paula L. Reimers | 3,399 | 0.10% | ▼0.05 |
| Socialist Labor | Frank Girard | 2,554 | 0.07% | ▼0.06 |
| U.S. Labor | Peter A. Signorelli | 2,218 | 0.06% | N/A |
| Total votes | | 3,490,412 | 100.00% | |
| Democratic hold | | Swing | | |

== Aftermath ==
Incumbent Senator Hart died of melanoma on December 26, and Riegle was appointed to finish the remaining days of his final term in office, giving him seniority over his freshman colleagues.

== See also ==
- 1976 United States Senate elections
