= 1972 United States House of Representatives elections =

House elections for the 93rd U.S. Congress

- November 7, 1972

All 435 seats in the United States House of Representatives 218 seats needed for a majority
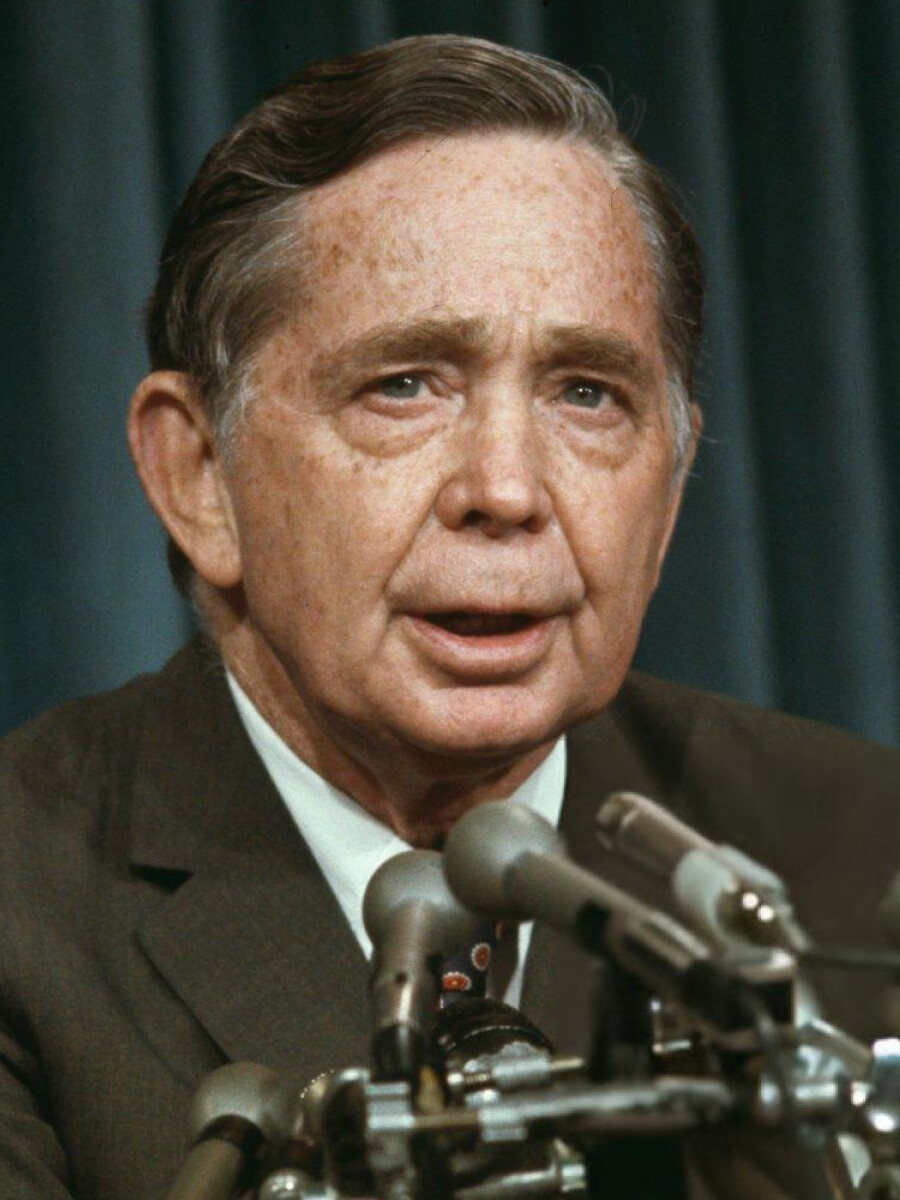

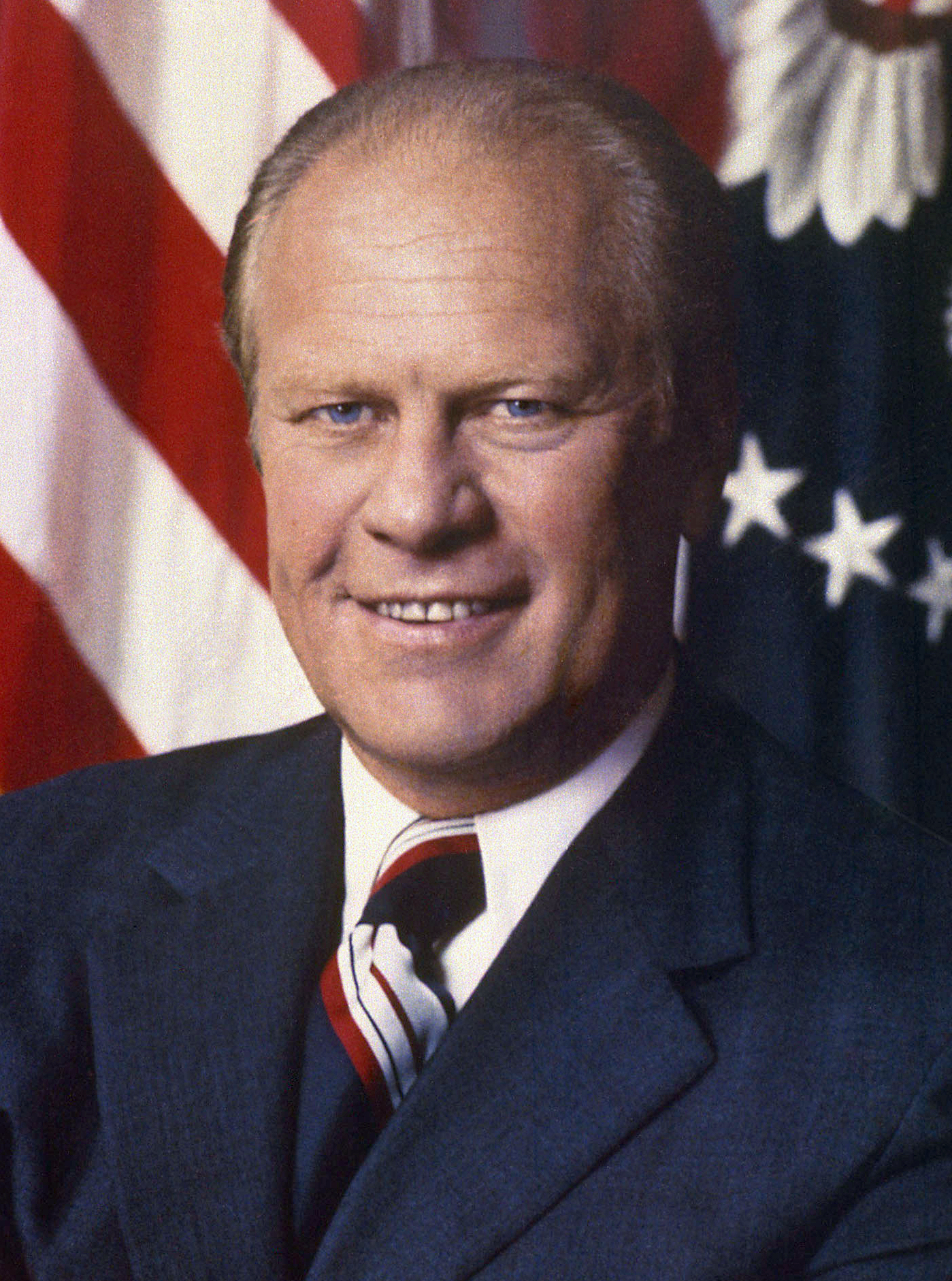
	Majority party	Minority party
Leader	Carl Albert	Gerald Ford
Party	Democratic	Republican
Leader since	January 21, 1971	January 3, 1965
Leader's seat	Oklahoma 3rd	Michigan 5th
Last election	255 seats	180 seats
Seats won	242	192
Seat change	▼13	▲12
Popular vote	36,780,100	33,064,172
Percentage	51.7%	46.4%
Swing	▼1.9pp	▲1.5pp
	Third party
Party	Independent
Last election	0 seats
Seats won	1
Seat change	▲1
Popular vote	137,664
Percentage	0.2%
Swing	Steady
- Results: Democratic hold Democratic gain Republican hold Republican gain Independent gain
Speaker before election
Carl Albert
Democratic
Elected Speaker
Carl Albert
Democratic

The 1972 United States House of Representatives elections were held on November 7, 1972, to elect U.S. representatives to serve in the 93rd United States Congress. This was the first election held after the 1970 United States redistricting cycle. It coincided with the landslide reelection victory of President Richard M. Nixon. Nixon's Republican Party managed to gain a net of twelve House of Representatives seats from the Democratic Party, although the Democrats retained a majority.

This was the first election in which citizens at least 18 years of age (instead of 21 and older) could vote, due to the recent passage of the 26th Amendment. This was the last time until 2022 that a Democrat would win a House seat in Alaska, and the first time since 1888 that a Republican won a House seat in Louisiana.

== Special elections ==
Six special elections were also held throughout the year, six before November and one concurrent with the November general election.

District	Incumbent			This race	
District	Member	Party	First elected	Results	Candidates
Vermont at-large	Robert Stafford	Republican	1960	Incumbent resigned September 16, 1971 when appointed U.S. Senator. New member elected January 7, 1972. Republican hold. Winner was re-elected in November.	✓ Richard W. Mallary (Republican) 55.80%; J. William O'Brien (Democratic) 37.60%; Doris Lake (Liberty Union) 4.70%; Anthony N. Doria (Independent) 1.89%
Alabama 3	George W. Andrews	Democratic	1944 (Special)	Incumbent died December 25, 1971. New member elected April 4, 1972. Democratic hold. Winner did not run for re-election in November.	✓ Elizabeth B. Andrews (Democratic); Unopposed; (See Widow's succession)
Illinois 15	Charlotte Thompson Reid	Republican	1962	Incumbent resigned October 7, 1971 to become Commissioner on the Federal Communications Commission. New member elected April 4, 1972. Republican hold. Winner was re-elected in November.	✓ Cliffard D. Carlson (Republican) 54.79%; Tim Lee Hall (Democratic) 45.21%
Pennsylvania 27	James G. Fulton	Republican	1944	Incumbent died October 6, 1971. New member elected April 25, 1972. Republican hold. Winner was not renominated in primary for election to full term in November (see below).	✓ William Sheldrick Conover (Republican) 51.05%; Doug Walgren (Democratic) 46.25%; Willard Holt (Constitution) 2.70%
Louisiana 7	Edwin Edwards	Democratic	1965 (Special)	Incumbent resigned May 9, 1972 when elected governor of Louisiana. New member elected September 30, 1972. Democratic hold. Winner was re-elected in November.	✓ John Breaux (Democratic); Unopposed
Virginia 6	Richard Harding Poff	Republican	1952	Incumbent resigned August 29, 1972 to become judge of the Supreme Court of Virginia. New member elected November 7, 1972. Republican hold. Winner was also elected the same day to the next term.	✓ M. Caldwell Butler (Republican) 51.8%; Willis M. Anderson (Democratic) 39.8%; Roy R. White (Independent) 8.4%

== Results ==
392 incumbent members sought reelection, but 13 were defeated in primaries and 13 defeated in the general election, for a total of 366 incumbents winning.

↓
242	1	192
Democratic	(Note: There was 1 Independent Democrat (Note: Joe Moakley was elected as an Independent Democrat, but before he took office changed his party affiliation to Democratic.))	Republican

Parties	Seats				Popular vote		
Parties	1970	1972	+/-	Strength	Vote	%	Change
Democratic Party	255	242	▼13	55.6%	36,780,100	51.7%	▼1.9%
Republican Party	180	192	▲12	44.2%	33,064,172	46.5%	▲1.6%
American Independent Party	0	0	Steady	0.0%	233,967	0.3%	▲0.1%
Conservative Party	0	0	Steady	0.0%	376,863	0.3%	▼0.1%
Liberal Party	0	0	Steady	0.0%	251,807	0.2%	▲0.1%
Independent	0	1	▲1	0.2%	137,664	0.2%	Steady
Peace and Freedom Party	0	0	Steady	0.0%	63,894	0.1%	Steady
Socialist Workers Party	0	0	Steady	0.0%	51,815	0.1%	▲0.1%
Prohibition Party	0	0	Steady	0.0%	10,902	<0.1%	Steady
Socialist Labor Party	0	0	Steady	0.0%	10,835	<0.1%	Steady
Communist Party	0	0	Steady	0.0%	2,076	<0.1%	Steady
Others	0	0	Steady	0.0%	206,386	<0.1%	▼0.1%
Total	435	435	Steady	100.0%	71,188,405	100.0%	Steady

Source: "Election Statistics". Office of the Clerk.

Popular vote
Democratic	51.67%
Republican	46.45%
Others	1.88%

House seats
Democratic	55.63%
Republican	44.14%
Others	0.23%

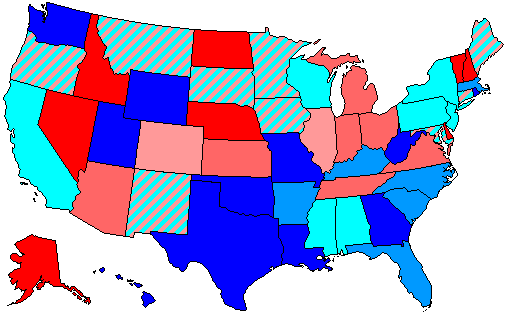
House seats by party holding plurality in state: 80+% Democratic / 80+% Republican; 60+ to 80% Democratic / 60+ to 80% Republican; up to 60% Democratic / up to 60% Republican

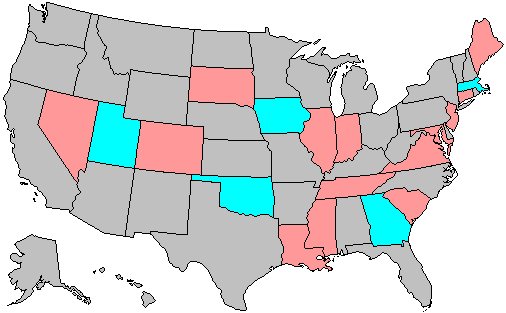
Change in seats: 6+ Democratic gain / 6+ Republican gain; 3–5 Democratic gain / 3–5 Republican gain; 1–2 Democratic gain / 1–2 Republican gain; no net change

Results shaded according to winner's share of vote

== Incumbents retiring ==
=== Democratic gains ===
- Georgia 5: Fletcher Thompson (R) retired to run for U.S. senator, succeeded by Andrew Young (D)
- New York 6: Seymour Halpern (R), retired, succeeded by Lester L. Wolff (D), who was redistricted
- Oklahoma 1: Page Belcher (R), retired, succeeded by James R. Jones (D)

=== Democratic holds ===
- Arkansas 4: David Pryor (D), retired to run for U.S. senator, succeeded by Ray Thornton (D)
- Illinois 11: Roman C. Pucinski (D), retired, succeeded by Frank Annunzio (D), who was redistricted
- Kentucky 6: William P. Curlin Jr. (D), retired, succeeded by John B. Breckinridge (D)
- Louisiana 8: Speedy Long (D), redistricted and retired, succeeded by Gillis William Long (D), who previously held the seat in the 88th Congress
- Maryland 3: Edward Garmatz (D), redistricted and retired, succeeded by Paul Sarbanes (D)
- Mississippi 2: Thomas Abernethy (D), redistricted and retired, succeeded by David R. Bowen (D)
- Missouri 6: William Raleigh Hull Jr. (D), retired, succeeded by Jerry Litton (D)
- North Carolina 4: Nick Galifianakis (D), retired to run for U.S. senator, succeeded by Ike Franklin Andrews (D)
- North Carolina 7: Alton Lennon (D), retired, succeeded by Charlie Rose (D)
- North Dakota 2: Arthur A. Link (D), redistricted retired to run for governor, succeeded by Mark Andrews (R), who was redistricted
- Oklahoma 2: Ed Edmondson (D), retired to run for U.S. senator, succeeded by Clem McSpadden (D)
- Tennessee 7: Ray Blanton (D), retired to run for U.S. senator, succeeded by Ed Jones (D), who was redistricted
- Texas 2: John Dowdy (D), retired, succeeded by Charles Wilson (D)

=== Republican gains ===
- Alabama 2: Elizabeth B. Andrews (D), redistricted and retired, succeeded by William Louis Dickinson (R)
- Illinois 11: Roman C. Pucinski (D), retired, succeeded by Frank Annunzio (D), who was redistricted
- Louisiana 3: Patrick T. Caffery (D), retired, succeeded by Dave Treen (R)
- Maine 2: William Hathaway (D), retired to run for U.S. senator, succeeded by William Cohen (R)
- Mississippi 4: Charles H. Griffin (D), redistricted and retired, succeeded by Thad Cochran (R)
- Mississippi 5: William M. Colmer (D), retired, succeeded by Trent Lott (R)
- South Dakota 2: James Abourezk (D), retired to run for U.S. senator, succeeded by James Abdnor (R)
- Virginia 4: Watkins Moorman Abbitt (D), retired, succeeded by Robert Daniel (R)

=== Republican holds ===
- California 20: H. Allen Smith (R), retired, succeeded by Carlos Moorhead (R)
- Idaho 1: James A. McClure (R), retired to run for U.S. senator, succeeded by Steve Symms (R)
- Illinois 15: Cliffard D. Carlson (R), retired, succeeded by Leslie C. Arends (R), who was redistricted
- Illinois 21: William L. Springer (R), retired, succeeded by Edward Rell Madigan (R)
- Missouri 7: Durward Gorham Hall (R), retired, succeeded by Gene Taylor (R)
- New Jersey 12: Florence P. Dwyer (R), retired, succeeded by Matthew John Rinaldo (R)
- New York 31: Alexander Pirnie (R), redistricted and retired, succeeded by Donald J. Mitchell (R)
- New York 33: John H. Terry (R), redistricted and retired, succeeded by William F. Walsh (R)
- North Carolina 9: Charles R. Jonas (R), retired, succeeded by James G. Martin (R)
- Ohio 4: William Moore McCulloch (R), retired, succeeded by Tennyson Guyer (R)
- Ohio 8: Jackson Edward Betts (R), retired, succeeded by Walter E. Powell (R), who was redistricted
- Ohio 16: Frank T. Bow (R), retired, succeeded by Ralph Regula (R)
- Pennsylvania 2: J. Irving Whalley (R), retired, succeeded by John P. Saylor (R), who was redistricted
- Virginia 8: William L. Scott (R), retired to run for U.S. senator, succeeded by Stanford Parris (R)
- Washington 1: Thomas Pelly (R), retired, succeeded by Joel Pritchard (R)
- Wisconsin 8: John W. Byrnes (R), retired, succeeded by Harold Vernon Froehlich (R)

== Incumbents defeated ==
=== Incumbents defeated in primary ===
1. California 8: George P. Miller (D)
2. California 39: John G. Schmitz (R)
3. Colorado 4: Wayne Aspinall (D)
4. Georgia 1: George Elliott Hagan (D)
5. Michigan 19: Jack H. McDonald (R)
6. Nevada at-large: Walter S. Baring Jr. (D)
7. New Jersey 13: Cornelius Edward Gallagher (D)
8. New York 18: Emanuel Celler (D)
9. New York 22: James H. Scheuer (D)
10. Pennsylvania 3: James A. Byrne (D)
11. Pennsylvania 22: William Sheldrick Conover (R)
12. South Carolina 6: John L. McMillan (D)
13. West Virginia 4: James Kee (D)

=== Incumbents defeated in general election ===
1. Colorado 1: Mike McKevitt (R)
2. Connecticut 5: John S. Monagan (D)
3. Illinois 10: Abner J. Mikva (D)
4. Indiana 11: Andrew Jacobs Jr. (D)
5. Iowa 1: Fred Schwengel (R)
6. Iowa 4: John Henry Kyl (R)
7. Massachusetts 9: Louise Day Hicks (D)
8. New York 26: John G. Dow (D)
9. Tennessee 6: William Anderson (D)
10. Texas 5: Earle Cabell (D)
11. Texas 13: Graham B. Purcell Jr. (D)
12. Utah 2: Sherman P. Lloyd (R)
13. Wisconsin 7: Alvin E. O'Konski (R)

== Alabama ==
Alabama was reapportioned from eight to seven seats and eliminated the old 3rd district, dividing it between the old 2nd and 4th, and making compensating boundary changes elsewhere.

District	Incumbent			This race	
District	Member	Party	First elected	Results	Candidates
Alabama 1	Jack Edwards	Republican	1964	Incumbent re-elected.	✓ Jack Edwards (Republican) 76.5%; O. W. "Bill" McCrory (Democratic) 17.8%; Thomas McAboy Jr. (National Democratic Party of Alabama) 5.7%
Alabama 2	William Louis Dickinson	Republican	1964	Incumbent re-elected.	✓ William Louis Dickinson (Republican) 54.9%; Ben C. Reeves (Democratic) 41.5%; Richard Boone (National Democratic Party of Alabama) 3.4%; Llewellyn B. Garth (Conservative) 0.3%
Alabama 2	Elizabeth B. Andrews; Redistricted from the 3rd district	Democratic	1972 (Special)	Incumbent retired. Democratic loss.	✓ William Louis Dickinson (Republican) 54.9%; Ben C. Reeves (Democratic) 41.5%; Richard Boone (National Democratic Party of Alabama) 3.4%; Llewellyn B. Garth (Conservative) 0.3%
Alabama 3	Bill Nichols; Redistricted from the 4th district	Democratic	1966	Incumbent re-elected.	✓ Bill Nichols (Democratic) 75.6%; Robert M. Kerr (Republican) 20.6%; John Ford (National Democratic Party of Alabama) 2.6%; James R. Connell (Prohibition) 1.3%
Alabama 4	Tom Bevill; Redistricted from the 7th district	Democratic	1966	Incumbent re-elected.	✓ Tom Bevill (Democratic) 69.6%; Ed Nelson (Republican) 30.0%; Daisy Williams (Prohibition) 0.5%
Alabama 5	Robert E. Jones Jr. Redistricted from the 8th district	Democratic	1947 (Special)	Incumbent re-elected.	✓ Robert E. Jones Jr. (Democratic) 74.2%; Dieter J. Schrader (Republican) 24.4%; Shirley Irwin (National Democratic Party of Alabama) 1.4%
Alabama 6	John Hall Buchanan Jr.	Republican	1964	Incumbent re-elected.	✓ John Hall Buchanan Jr. (Republican) 59.8%; Ben Erdreich (Democratic) 35.6%; Al Thomas (National Democratic Party of Alabama) 2.5%; Edna L. Bowling (Prohibition) 1.2%; Dan Scott (Conservative) 0.9%
Alabama 7	Walter Flowers; Redistricted from the 5th district	Democratic	1968	Incumbent re-elected.	✓ Walter Flowers (Democratic) 84.8%; Lewis Black (National Democratic Party of Alabama) 14.0%; Hal Radue (Conservative) 1.1%

== Alaska ==
Incumbent Nick Begich won re-election three weeks after having disappeared in a plane crash October 16; challenger Don Young would later win a March special election after Begich was declared dead on December 29.

District	Incumbent			This race	
District	Member	Party	First elected	Results	Candidates
Alaska at-large	Nick Begich	Democratic	1970	Incumbent re-elected posthumously.	✓ Nick Begich (Democratic) 56.2%; Don Young (Republican) 43.8%

== Arizona ==
Arizona was reapportioned from three seats to four, and carved a new district in the Phoenix suburbs and the northeast from parts of the existing districts.

District	Incumbent			This race	
District	Member	Party	First elected	Results	Candidates
Arizona 1	John Jacob Rhodes	Republican	1952	Incumbent re-elected.	✓ John Jacob Rhodes (Republican) 57.3%; Gerald A. Pollock (Democratic) 42.7%
Arizona 2	Mo Udall	Democratic	1961 (Special)	Incumbent re-elected.	✓ Mo Udall (Democratic) 63.5%; Gene Savoie (Republican) 36.5%
Arizona 3	Sam Steiger	Republican	1966	Incumbent re-elected.	✓ Sam Steiger (Republican) 63.0%; Ted Wyckoff (Democratic) 37.0%
Arizona 4	None (district created)			New seat. Republican gain.	✓ John Bertrand Conlan (Republican) 53.0%; Jack E. Brown (Democratic) 47.0%

== Arkansas ==
District	Incumbent			This race	
District	Member	Party	First elected	Results	Candidates
Arkansas 1	William Vollie Alexander Jr.	Democratic	1968	Incumbent re-elected.	✓ William Vollie Alexander Jr. (Democratic); Unopposed
Arkansas 2	Wilbur Mills	Democratic	1938	Incumbent re-elected.	✓ Wilbur Mills (Democratic); Unopposed
Arkansas 3	John Paul Hammerschmidt	Republican	1966	Incumbent re-elected.	✓ John Paul Hammerschmidt (Republican) 77.3%; Guy W. Hatfield (Democratic) 22.7%
Arkansas 4	David Pryor	Democratic	1966	Retired to run for U.S. senator. Democratic hold.	✓ Ray Thornton (Democratic) 83%; John Norman Warnock (American Independent) 17%

== California ==
California was reapportioned from 38 to 43 seats, adding one seat in the Bay Area, one in the Central Valley, and three in southern California; three went to Democrats, two to Republicans. Despite a retirement and two lost renominations, both parties held their seats in this election, bringing the Democrats up from 20 seats to 23 and the Republicans up from 18 seats to 20.

District	Incumbent			This race	
District	Member	Party	First elected	Results	Candidates
California 1	Donald H. Clausen	Republican	1963	Incumbent re-elected.	✓ Donald H. Clausen (Republican) 62.2%; William Nighswonger (Democratic) 34.1%; Jonathan T. Ames (Peace and Freedom) 3.7%
California 2	Harold T. Johnson	Democratic	1958	Incumbent re-elected.	✓ Harold T. Johnson (Democratic) 68.3%; Francis X. Callahan (Republican) 28.6%; Dorothy D. Paradis (American) 3.1%
California 3	John E. Moss	Democratic	1952	Incumbent re-elected.	✓ John E. Moss (Democratic) 69.9%; John Rakus (Republican) 30.1%
California 4	Robert L. Leggett	Democratic	1962	Incumbent re-elected.	✓ Robert L. Leggett (Democratic) 67.4%; Benjamin Chang (Republican) 32.6%
California 5	Phillip Burton	Democratic	1964	Incumbent re-elected.	✓ Phillip Burton (Democratic) 81.8%; Edlo E. Powell (Republican) 18.2%
California 6	William S. Mailliard	Republican	1952	Incumbent re-elected.	✓ William S. Mailliard (Republican) 52.0%; Roger Boas (Democratic) 48.0%
California 7	Ron Dellums	Democratic	1970	Incumbent re-elected.	✓ Ron Dellums (Democratic) 56.0%; Peter Hannaford (Republican) 38.0%; Frank V. Cortese (American) 6.0%
California 8	George P. Miller	Democratic	1944	Incumbent lost renomination. Democratic hold.	✓ Pete Stark (Democratic) 52.9%; Lew M. Warden Jr. (Republican) 47.1%
California 9	Don Edwards	Democratic	1962	Incumbent re-elected.	✓ Don Edwards (Democratic) 72.3%; Herb Smith (Republican) 25.2%; Edmon V. Kaiser (American) 2.6%
California 10	Charles S. Gubser	Republican	1952	Incumbent re-elected.	✓ Charles S. Gubser (Republican) 64.6%; B. Frank Gillette (Democratic) 35.4%
California 11	None (district created)			New seat. Democratic gain.	✓ Leo Ryan (Democratic) 60.4%; Charles E. Chase (Republican) 37.0%; Nicholas W. Kudrovzeff (American) 2.6%
California 12	Burt L. Talcott	Republican	1962	Incumbent re-elected.	✓ Burt L. Talcott (Republican) 54.0%; Julian Camacho (Democratic) 43.1%; Stanley K. Monteith (American) 2.9%
California 13	Charles M. Teague	Republican	1954	Incumbent re-elected.	✓ Charles M. Teague (Republican) 73.9%; Lester Dean Cleveland (Democratic) 26.1%
California 14	Jerome Waldie	Democratic	1966	Incumbent re-elected.	✓ Jerome Waldie (Democratic) 77.6%; Floyd E. Sims (Republican) 22.4%
California 15	John J. McFall	Democratic	1956	Incumbent re-elected.	✓ John J. McFall (Democratic); Unopposed
California 16	B. F. Sisk	Democratic	1954	Incumbent re-elected.	✓ B. F. Sisk (Democratic) 79.1%; Carol O. Harner (Republican) 20.9%
California 17	Pete McCloskey; Redistricted from the 11th district	Republican	1967	Incumbent re-elected.	✓ Pete McCloskey (Republican) 60.2%; James Stewart (Democratic) 39.8%
California 18	Bob Mathias	Republican	1966	Incumbent re-elected.	✓ Bob Mathias (Republican) 66.5%; Vincent J. Lavery (Democratic) 33.5%
California 19	Chet Holifield	Democratic	1942	Incumbent re-elected.	✓ Chet Holifield (Democratic) 67.2%; Kenneth M. Fisher (Republican) 27.9%; Joe Harris (Peace and Freedom) 4.9%
California 20	H. Allen Smith	Republican	1956	Incumbent retired. Republican hold.	✓ Carlos Moorhead (Republican) 57.4%; John Binkley (Democratic) 42.6%
California 21	Augustus Hawkins	Democratic	1962	Incumbent re-elected.	✓ Augustus Hawkins (Democratic) 82.9%; Rayfield Lundy (Republican) 17.1%
California 22	James C. Corman	Democratic	1960	Incumbent re-elected.	✓ James C. Corman (Democratic) 67.6%; Bruce P. Wolfe (Republican) 29.3%; Ralph L. Shroyer (Peace and Freedom) 3.1%
California 23	Del M. Clawson	Republican	1963	Incumbent re-elected.	✓ Del M. Clawson (Republican) 61.4%; Conrad G. Tuohey (Democratic) 38.6%
California 24	John H. Rousselot	Republican	1960; 1962 (defeated); 1970 (Special)	Incumbent re-elected.	✓ John H. Rousselot (Republican) 70.1%; Luther Mandell (Democratic) 29.9%
California 25	Charles E. Wiggins	Republican	1966	Incumbent re-elected.	✓ Charles E. Wiggins (Republican) 64.9%; Leslie W. Craven (Democratic) 31.9%; Alfred Romirez (American) 3.1%
California 26	Thomas M. Rees	Democratic	1965	Incumbent re-elected.	✓ Thomas M. Rees (Democratic) 68.6%; Philip Robert Rutta (Republican) 27.9%; Mike Timko (Peace and Freedom) 3.5%
California 27	Barry Goldwater Jr.	Republican	1969	Incumbent re-elected.	✓ Barry Goldwater Jr. (Republican) 57.4%; Mark S. Novak (Democratic) 42.6%
California 28	Alphonzo E. Bell Jr.	Republican	1960	Incumbent re-elected.	✓ Alphonzo E. Bell Jr. (Republican) 60.7%; Michael Shapiro (Democratic) 37.5%; Jack Hampton (Peace and Freedom) 1.8%
California 29	George E. Danielson	Democratic	1970	Incumbent re-elected.	✓ George E. Danielson (Democratic) 62.8%; Richard E. Ferraro Jr. (Republican) 33.5%; John W. Blaine (Peace and Freedom) 3.7%
California 30	Edward R. Roybal	Democratic	1962	Incumbent re-elected.	✓ Edward R. Roybal (Democratic) 68.4%; Bill Brophy (Republican) 28.6%; Lewis B. McCammon (Peace and Freedom) 3.0%
California 31	Charles H. Wilson	Democratic	1962	Incumbent re-elected.	✓ Charles H. Wilson (Democratic) 52.3%; Ben Valentine (Republican) 42.5%; Roberta Lynn Wood (Peace and Freedom) 5.2%
California 32	Craig Hosmer	Republican	1952	Incumbent re-elected.	✓ Craig Hosmer (Republican) 65.9%; Dennis Murray (Democratic) 32.0%; John S. Donohue (Peace and Freedom) 2.2%
California 33	Jerry Pettis	Republican	1966	Incumbent re-elected.	✓ Jerry Pettis (Republican) 75.1%; Ken Thompson (Democratic) 24.9%
California 34	Richard T. Hanna	Democratic	1962	Incumbent re-elected.	✓ Richard T. Hanna (Democratic) 67.2%; John D. Ratterree (Republican) 28.9%; Lee R. Rayburn (American Independent) 3.9%
California 35	Glenn M. Anderson; Redistricted from the 17th district	Democratic	1968	Incumbent re-elected.	✓ Glenn M. Anderson (Democratic) 74.8%; Vernon E. Brown (Republican) 25.2%
California 36	None (district created)			New seat. Republican gain.	✓ William M. Ketchum (Republican) 52.7%; Timothy Lemucchi (Democratic) 43.5%; Bill Armour (American) 3.8%
California 37	None (district created)			New seat. Democratic gain.	✓ Yvonne Brathwaite Burke (Democratic) 73.2%; Gregg Tria (Republican) 24.7%; John Haag (Peace and Freedom) 2.1%
California 38	None (district created)			New seat. Democratic gain.	✓ George Brown Jr. (Democratic) 56.3%; Howard J. Snider (Republican) 43.7%
California 39	John G. Schmitz; Redistricted from the 35th district	Republican	1970	Incumbent lost renomination. Republican hold.	✓ Andrew J. Hinshaw (Republican) 65.7%; John Woodland Black (Democratic) 34.3%
California 40	Bob Wilson; Redistricted from the 36th district	Republican	1952	Incumbent re-elected.	✓ Bob Wilson (Republican) 67.8%; Frank Caprio (Democratic) 30.3%; Fritjof Thygeson (Peace and Freedom) 1.9%
California 41	Lionel Van Deerlin; Redistricted from the 37th district	Democratic	1962	Incumbent re-elected.	✓ Lionel Van Deerlin (Democratic) 74.1%; D. Richard Kau (Republican) 25.9%
California 42	None (district created)			New seat. Republican gain.	✓ Clair Burgener (Republican) 67.4%; Bob Lowe (Democratic) 29.2%; Armin R. Moths (American) 3.4%
California 43	Victor Veysey; Redistricted from the 38th district	Republican	1970	Incumbent re-elected.	✓ Victor Veysey (Republican) 62.7%; Ernest Z. Robles (Democratic) 37.3%

== Colorado ==
Colorado was reapportioned from four to five seats, constructing a new 5th district east and south of Denver.

District	Incumbent			This race	
District	Member	Party	First elected	Results	Candidates
Colorado 1	Mike McKevitt	Republican	1970	Incumbent lost re-election. Democratic gain.	✓ Pat Schroeder (Democratic) 51.6%; Mike McKevitt (Republican) 47.5%; Marie Pauline Serna (La Raza Unida) 0.8%; Fern Gapin (Socialist Workers) 0.2%
Colorado 2	Donald G. Brotzman	Republican	1962; 1964 (defeated); 1966	Incumbent re-elected.	✓ Donald G. Brotzman (Republican) 66.3%; Francis W. Brush (Democratic) 33.4%; Joel Houtman (Socialist Workers) 0.3%
Colorado 3	Frank Evans	Democratic	1964	Incumbent re-elected.	✓ Frank Evans (Democratic) 66.3%; Chuck Brady (Republican) 33.7%
Colorado 4	Wayne N. Aspinall	Democratic	1948	Incumbent lost renomination. Republican gain.	✓ James Paul Johnson (Republican) 51.0%; Alan Merson (Democratic) 49.0%
Colorado 5	None (district created)			New seat. Republican gain.	✓ William L. Armstrong (Republican) 62.3%; Byron L. Johnson (Democratic) 36.5%; Pipp M. Boyls (Libertarian) 1.2%

== Connecticut ==
District	Incumbent			This race	
District	Member	Party	First elected	Results	Candidates
Connecticut 1	William R. Cotter	Democratic	1970	Incumbent re-elected.	✓ William R. Cotter (Democratic) 56.9%; Richard M. Rittenband (Republican) 41.9%; Charlie A. Burke (American Independent) 1.2%
Connecticut 2	Robert H. Steele	Republican	1970	Incumbent re-elected.	✓ Robert H. Steele (Republican) 65.9%; Roger Hilsman (Democratic) 34.1%
Connecticut 3	Robert Giaimo	Democratic	1958	Incumbent re-elected.	✓ Robert Giaimo (Democratic) 53.3%; Henry A. Povinelli (Republican) 46.7%
Connecticut 4	Stewart McKinney	Republican	1970	Incumbent re-elected.	✓ Stewart McKinney (Republican) 63.1%; James P. McLoughlin (Democratic) 36.9%
Connecticut 5	John S. Monagan	Democratic	1958	Incumbent lost re-election. Republican gain.	✓ Ronald A. Sarasin (Republican) 51.2%; John S. Monagan (Democratic) 48.8%
Connecticut 6	Ella Grasso	Democratic	1970	Incumbent re-elected.	✓ Ella Grasso (Democratic) 60.2%; John F. Walsh (Republican) 39.8%

== Delaware ==
District	Incumbent			This race	
District	Member	Party	First elected	Results	Candidates
Delaware at-large	Pete du Pont	Republican	1970	Incumbent re-elected.	✓ Pete du Pont (Republican) 62.5%; Norma Handloff (Democratic) 36.9%; Robert G. LoPresti (American) 0.5%; Rachel Dickerson (Prohibition) 0.1%

== Florida ==
Florida was reapportioned from 12 to 15 seats, adding a seat in central and two in south Florida.

District	Incumbent			This race	
District	Member	Party	First elected	Results	Candidates
Florida 1	Bob Sikes	Democratic	1940; 1944 (resigned); 1974	Incumbent re-elected.	✓ Bob Sikes (Democratic); Unopposed
Florida 2	Don Fuqua	Democratic	1962	Incumbent re-elected.	✓ Don Fuqua (Democratic); Unopposed
Florida 3	Charles E. Bennett	Democratic	1948	Incumbent re-elected.	✓ Charles E. Bennett (Democratic) 82.0%; John F. Bowen (Republican) 18.0%
Florida 4	Bill Chappell	Democratic	1968	Incumbent re-elected.	✓ Bill Chappell (Democratic) 55.9%; Bud Fleuchaus (Republican) 44.1%
Florida 5	None (district created)			New seat. Democratic gain.	✓ Bill Gunter (Democratic) 55.5%; Jack P. Insco (Republican) 44.5%
Florida 6	Bill Young; Redistricted from the 8th district	Republican	1970	Incumbent re-elected.	✓ Bill Young (Republican) 76.0%; Michael O. Plunkett (Democratic) 24.0%
Florida 7	Sam Gibbons; Redistricted from the 6th district	Democratic	1962	Incumbent re-elected.	✓ Sam Gibbons (Democratic) 68.0%; Robert A. Carter (Republican) 32.0%
Florida 8	James A. Haley; Redistricted from the 7th district	Democratic	1952	Incumbent re-elected.	✓ James A. Haley (Democratic) 57.8%; Roy Thompson Jr. (Republican) 42.2%
Florida 9	Louis Frey Jr. Redistricted from the 5th district	Republican	1968	Incumbent re-elected.	✓ Louis Frey Jr. (Republican); Unopposed
Florida 10	None (district created)			New seat. Republican gain.	✓ Skip Bafalis (Republican) 62.0%; Bill Sikes (Democratic) 38.0%
Florida 11	Paul Rogers; Redistricted from the 9th district	Democratic	1954	Incumbent re-elected.	✓ Paul Rogers (Democratic) 60.2%; Joel Karl Gustafson (Republican) 39.8%
Florida 12	J. Herbert Burke; Redistricted from the 10th district	Republican	1966	Incumbent re-elected.	✓ J. Herbert Burke (Republican) 62.8%; James T. Stephanis (Democratic) 37.2%
Florida 13	None (district created)			New seat. Democratic gain.	✓ William Lehman (Democratic) 61.6%; Paul D. Bethel (Republican) 38.4%
Florida 14	Claude Pepper; Redistricted from the 11th district	Democratic	1962	Incumbent re-elected.	✓ Claude Pepper (Democratic) 67.6%; Evelio S. Estrella (Republican) 32.4%
Florida 15	Dante Fascell; Redistricted from the 12th district	Democratic	1954	Incumbent re-elected.	✓ Dante Fascell (Democratic) 56.8%; Ellis B. Rubin (Republican) 43.2%

== Georgia ==
District	Incumbent			This race	
District	Member	Party	First elected	Results	Candidates
Georgia 1	George Elliott Hagan	Democratic	1960	Incumbent lost renomination. Democratic hold.	✓ Ronald "Bo" Ginn (Democratic); Unopposed
Georgia 2	Dawson Mathis	Democratic	1970	Incumbent re-elected.	✓ Dawson Mathis (Democratic); Unopposed
Georgia 3	Jack Brinkley	Democratic	1966	Incumbent re-elected.	✓ Jack Brinkley (Democratic); Unopposed
Georgia 4	Benjamin B. Blackburn	Republican	1966	Incumbent re-elected.	✓ Benjamin B. Blackburn (Republican) 75.9%; F. Odell Welborn (Democratic) 24.1%
Georgia 5	Fletcher Thompson	Republican	1966	Retired to run for U.S. senator. Democratic gain.	✓ Andrew Young (Democratic) 52.8%; Rodney Mims Cook Sr. (Republican) 47.2%
Georgia 6	John Flynt	Democratic	1954	Incumbent re-elected.	✓ John Flynt (Democratic); Unopposed
Georgia 7	John William Davis	Democratic	1960	Incumbent re-elected.	✓ John William Davis (Democratic) 58.3%; Charlie Sherrill (Republican) 41.7%
Georgia 8	W. S. Stuckey Jr.	Democratic	1966	Incumbent re-elected.	✓ W. S. Stuckey Jr. (Democratic) 62.4%; Ronnie Thompson (Republican) 37.6%
Georgia 9	Phillip M. Landrum	Democratic	1952	Incumbent re-elected.	✓ Phillip M. Landrum (Democratic); Unopposed
Georgia 10	Robert Grier Stephens Jr.	Democratic	1960	Incumbent re-elected.	✓ Robert Grier Stephens Jr. (Democratic); Unopposed

== Hawaii ==
District	Incumbent			This race	
District	Member	Party	First elected	Results	Candidates
Hawaii 1	Spark Matsunaga	Democratic	1962	Incumbent re-elected.	✓ Spark Matsunaga (Democratic) 54.7%; Fred W. Rohlfing (Republican) 45.3%
Hawaii 2	Patsy Mink	Democratic	1964	Incumbent re-elected.	✓ Patsy Mink (Democratic) 57.1%; Diana Hansen (Republican) 42.9%

== Idaho ==
District	Incumbent			This race	
District	Member	Party	First elected	Results	Candidates
Idaho 1	James A. McClure	Republican	1966	Retired to run for U.S. senator. Republican hold.	✓ Steve Symms (Republican) 55.6%; Ed Williams (Democratic) 44.4%
Idaho 2	Orval H. Hansen	Republican	1968	Incumbent re-elected.	✓ Orval H. Hansen (Republican) 69.2%; Willis H. Ludlow (Democratic) 27.0%; John L. Thiebert (American) 3.8%

== Illinois ==
District	Incumbent			This race	
District	Member	Party	First elected	Results	Candidates
Illinois 1	Ralph Metcalfe	Democratic	1970	Incumbent re-elected.	✓ Ralph Metcalfe (Democratic) 91.4%; Louis Coggs (Republican) 8.6%
Illinois 1	Abner Mikva; Redistricted from the 2nd district	Democratic	1968	Incumbent ran in the 10th district and lost re-election there. Democratic loss	✓ Ralph Metcalfe (Democratic) 91.4%; Louis Coggs (Republican) 8.6%
Illinois 2	Morgan F. Murphy; Redistricted from the 3rd district	Democratic	1970	Incumbent re-elected.	✓ Morgan F. Murphy (Democratic) 75.0%; James E. Doyle (Republican) 25.0%
Illinois 3	None (district created)			New seat. Republican gain.	✓ Robert P. Hanrahan (Republican) 62.3%; Daniel P. Coman (Democratic) 37.7%
Illinois 4	Ed Derwinski	Republican	1958	Incumbent re-elected.	✓ Ed Derwinski (Republican) 70.5%; C. F. 'Bob' Dore (Democratic) 29.5%
Illinois 5	John C. Kluczynski	Democratic	1950	Incumbent re-elected.	✓ John C. Kluczynski (Democratic) 72.8%; Leonard C. Jarzab (Republican) 27.2%
Illinois 6	Harold R. Collier; Redistricted from the 10th district	Republican	1956	Incumbent re-elected.	✓ Harold R. Collier (Republican) 61.2%; Michael R. Galasso (Democratic) 38.8%
Illinois 7	George W. Collins; Redistricted from the 6th district	Democratic	1970	Incumbent re-elected.	✓ George W. Collins (Democratic) 82.8%; Thomas J. Lento (Republican) 17.2%
Illinois 8	Dan Rostenkowski	Democratic	1958	Incumbent re-elected.	✓ Dan Rostenkowski (Democratic) 74.0%; Edward Stepnowski (Republican) 26.0%
Illinois 9	Sidney R. Yates	Democratic	1948; 1962 (retired); 1964	Incumbent re-elected.	✓ Sidney R. Yates (Democratic) 68.3%; Clark W. Fetridge (Republican) 31.7%
Illinois 10	None (district created)			New seat. Republican gain.	✓ Samuel H. Young (Republican) 51.6%; Abner Mikva (Democratic) 48.4%
Illinois 11	Roman Pucinski	Democratic	1958	Retired to run for U.S. senator. Democratic loss.	✓ Frank Annunzio (Democratic) 53.3%; John J. Hoellen Jr. (Republican) 46.7%
Illinois 11	Frank Annunzio; Redistricted from the 7th district	Democratic	1964	Incumbent re-elected.	✓ Frank Annunzio (Democratic) 53.3%; John J. Hoellen Jr. (Republican) 46.7%
Illinois 12	Phil Crane; Redistricted from the 13th district	Republican	1969	Incumbent re-elected.	✓ Phil Crane (Republican) 74.2%; Edwin L. Frank (Democratic) 25.8%
Illinois 13	Robert McClory; Redistricted from the 12th district	Republican	1962	Incumbent re-elected.	✓ Robert McClory (Republican) 61.5%; Stanley W. Beetham (Democratic) 38.5%
Illinois 14	John N. Erlenborn	Republican	1964	Incumbent re-elected.	✓ John N. Erlenborn (Republican) 72.8%; James M. Wall (Democratic) 27.2%
Illinois 15	Cliffard D. Carlson	Republican	1972 (Special)	Incumbent retired. Republican loss.	✓ Leslie C. Arends (Republican) 57.2%; Tim Lee Hall (Democratic) 42.8%
Illinois 15	Leslie C. Arends; Redistricted from the 17th district	Republican	1934	Incumbent re-elected.	✓ Leslie C. Arends (Republican) 57.2%; Tim Lee Hall (Democratic) 42.8%
Illinois 16	John B. Anderson	Republican	1960	Incumbent re-elected.	✓ John B. Anderson (Republican) 71.9%; John E. Devine Jr. (Democratic) 28.1%
Illinois 17	None (district created)			New seat. Republican gain.	✓ George M. O'Brien (Republican) 55.6%; John J. Houlihan (Democratic) 44.4%
Illinois 18	Robert H. Michel	Republican	1956	Incumbent re-elected.	✓ Robert H. Michel (Republican) 64.8%; Steven L. Nordvall (Democratic) 35.2%
Illinois 19	Tom Railsback	Republican	1966	Incumbent re-elected.	✓ Tom Railsback (Republican); Unopposed
Illinois 20	Paul Findley	Republican	1960	Incumbent re-elected.	✓ Paul Findley (Republican) 68.8%; Robert S. O'Shea (Democratic) 31.2%
Illinois 21	William L. Springer; Redistricted from the 22nd district	Republican	1950	Incumbent retired. Republican hold.	✓ Edward Rell Madigan (Republican) 54.8%; Lawrence E. Johnson (Democratic) 45.2%
Illinois 22	George E. Shipley; Redistricted from the 23rd district	Democratic	1958	Incumbent re-elected.	✓ George E. Shipley (Democratic) 56.5%; Robert B. Lamkin (Republican) 41.0%; Cleo A. Duzan (Independent) 2.4%
Illinois 23	Melvin Price; Redistricted from the 24th district	Democratic	1944	Incumbent re-elected.	✓ Melvin Price (Democratic) 75.1%; Robert Mays (Republican) 24.9%
Illinois 24	Kenneth J. Gray; Redistricted from the 21st district	Democratic	1954	Incumbent re-elected.	✓ Kenneth J. Gray (Democratic) 93.7%; Hugh Muldoon (Independent) 6.3%

== Indiana ==
District	Incumbent			This race	
District	Member	Party	First elected	Results	Candidates
Indiana 1	Ray Madden	Democratic	1942	Incumbent re-elected.	✓ Ray Madden (Democratic) 56.9%; Bruce R. Haller (Republican) 43.1%
Indiana 2	Earl Landgrebe	Republican	1968	Incumbent re-elected.	✓ Earl Landgrebe (Republican) 54.7%; Floyd Fithian (Democratic) 45.3%
Indiana 3	John Brademas	Democratic	1958	Incumbent re-elected.	✓ John Brademas (Democratic) 55.2%; Don M. Newman (Republican) 43.2%; Helen Calvin (American) 1.5%
Indiana 4	J. Edward Roush	Democratic	1958; 1968 (defeated); 1970	Incumbent re-elected.	✓ J. Edward Roush (Democratic) 51.5%; Allan E. Bloom (Republican) 48.5%
Indiana 5	Elwood Hillis	Republican	1970	Incumbent re-elected.	✓ Elwood Hillis (Republican) 64.1%; Kathleen Z. Williams (Democratic) 35.9%
Indiana 6	William G. Bray	Republican	1950	Incumbent re-elected.	✓ William G. Bray (Republican) 64.8%; David W. Evans (Democratic) 35.2%
Indiana 7	John T. Myers	Republican	1966	Incumbent re-elected.	✓ John T. Myers (Republican) 61.6%; Warren P. Henegar (Democratic) 38.4%
Indiana 8	Roger H. Zion	Republican	1966	Incumbent re-elected.	✓ Roger H. Zion (Republican) 63.4%; Richard L. Deen (Democratic) 36.6%
Indiana 9	Lee H. Hamilton	Democratic	1964	Incumbent re-elected.	✓ Lee H. Hamilton (Democratic) 62.9%; William A. Johnson (Republican) 37.1%
Indiana 10	David W. Dennis	Republican	1968	Incumbent re-elected.	✓ David W. Dennis (Republican) 57.2%; Philip Sharp (Democratic) 42.8%
Indiana 11	Andrew Jacobs Jr.	Democratic	1964	Incumbent lost re-election. Republican gain.	✓ William H. Hudnut III (Republican) 51.2%; Andrew Jacobs Jr. (Democratic) 48.8%

== Iowa ==
Iowa was reapportioned from seven seats to six, dividing the old 5th district around Des Moines between its neighbors. Its incumbent, Neal Smith, won again in the south-central Iowa 4th district.

District	Incumbent			This race	
District	Member	Party	First elected	Results	Candidates
Iowa 1	Fred Schwengel	Republican	1954; 1964 (defeated); 1966	Incumbent lost re-election. Democratic gain.	✓ Edward Mezvinsky (Democratic) 53.4%; Fred Schwengel (Republican) 45.7%; Lee E. Foster (American Independent) 1.0%
Iowa 2	John C. Culver	Democratic	1964	Incumbent re-elected.	✓ John C. Culver (Democratic) 59.2%; Theodore R. Ellsworth (Republican) 40.8%
Iowa 3	H. R. Gross	Republican	1948	Incumbent re-elected.	✓ H. R. Gross (Republican) 55.7%; Lyle D. Taylor (Democratic) 44.3%
Iowa 4	John Henry Kyl	Republican	1959 (special); 1964 (defeated); 1966	Incumbent lost re-election. Republican loss.	✓ Neal Smith (Democratic) 59.2%; John Henry Kyl (Republican) 40.8%
Iowa 4	Neal Smith; Redistricted from the 5th district	Democratic	1958	Incumbent re-elected.	✓ Neal Smith (Democratic) 59.2%; John Henry Kyl (Republican) 40.8%
Iowa 5	William J. Scherle; Redistricted from the 7th district	Republican	1966	Incumbent re-elected.	✓ William J. Scherle (Republican) 55.3%; Tom Harkin (Democratic) 44.7%
Iowa 6	Wiley Mayne	Republican	1966	Incumbent re-elected.	✓ Wiley Mayne (Republican) 52.5%; Berkley Bedell (Democratic) 47.5%

== Kansas ==
District	Incumbent			This race	
District	Member	Party	First elected	Results	Candidates
Kansas 1	Keith Sebelius	Republican	1968	Incumbent re-elected.	✓ Keith Sebelius (Republican) 77.2%; Morris Coover (Democratic) 21.6%; Daniel Scoggin (Prohibition) 1.2%
Kansas 2	William R. Roy	Democratic	1970	Incumbent re-elected.	✓ William R. Roy (Democratic) 60.6%; Charles D. McAtee (Republican) 37.1%; Bert Falley (Conservative) 1.8%; David Scoggin (Prohibition) 0.5%
Kansas 3	Larry Winn	Republican	1966	Incumbent re-elected.	✓ Larry Winn (Republican) 71.0%; Charles Barsotti (Democratic) 25.4%; Warren E. Redding (Conservative) 3.6%
Kansas 4	Garner E. Shriver	Republican	1960	Incumbent re-elected.	✓ Garner E. Shriver (Republican) 73.2%; John S. Stevens (Democratic) 24.8%; Wayne Nobbs Jr. (Prohibition) 2.0%
Kansas 5	Joe Skubitz	Republican	1962	Incumbent re-elected.	✓ Joe Skubitz (Republican) 72.3%; Lloyd L. Kitch Jr. (Democratic) 27.7%

== Kentucky ==
District	Incumbent			This race	
District	Member	Party	First elected	Results	Candidates
Kentucky 1	Frank Stubblefield	Democratic	1958	Incumbent re-elected.	✓ Frank Stubblefield (Democratic) 64.8%; Charles Thurman Banken Jr. (Republican) 33.7%; John M. Katterjohn (Independent) 1.5%
Kentucky 2	William Natcher	Democratic	1953 (Special)	Incumbent re-elected.	✓ William Natcher (Democratic) 61.5%; J. C. Carter (Republican) 38.5%
Kentucky 3	Romano Mazzoli	Democratic	1970	Incumbent re-elected.	✓ Romano Mazzoli (Democratic) 62.2%; Phil Kaelin Jr. (Republican) 37.0%; William P. Chambers (American) 0.9%
Kentucky 4	Gene Snyder	Republican	1962; 1964 (defeated); 1966	Incumbent re-elected.	✓ Gene Snyder (Republican) 73.8%; James W. Rogers (Democratic) 26.2%
Kentucky 5	Tim Lee Carter	Republican	1964	Incumbent re-elected.	✓ Tim Lee Carter (Republican) 73.5%; Lyle L. Willis (Democratic) 26.5%
Kentucky 6	William P. Curlin Jr.	Democratic	1971 (Special)	Incumbent retired. Democratic hold.	✓ John B. Breckinridge (Democratic) 52.4%; Laban P. Jackson (Republican) 46.8%; Thomas F. Lundeen (Peoples) 0.8%
Kentucky 7	Carl D. Perkins	Democratic	1948	Incumbent re-elected.	✓ Carl D. Perkins (Democratic) 61.9%; Robert Holcomb (Republican) 38.1%

== Louisiana ==
Louisiana stayed at eight house seats following the 1970 census, but the Eighth District's boundaries were radically altered. New governor Edwin W. Edwards ordered the district to take in territory far to the south and east of its traditional base of Alexandria, which included many African-American and progressive white voters. The change was largely regarded as an election deal between Edwards and former Rep. Gillis Long, who finished third in the Democratic primary in the 1971 Louisiana governor's election behind Edwards and J. Bennett Johnston. Long easily won back the Eighth District seat he lost in 1964 to cousin Speedy Long. Speedy Long retired when his home of LaSalle Parish was shifted to the Fifth District, where incumbent Otto Passman was entrenched.

District	Incumbent			This race	
District	Member	Party	First elected	Results	Candidates
Louisiana 1	F. Edward Hébert	Democratic	1940	Incumbent re-elected.	✓ F. Edward Hébert (Democratic); Unopposed
Louisiana 2	Hale Boggs	Democratic	1940; 1942 (lost renomination); 1946	Incumbent re-elected posthumously.	✓ Hale Boggs (Democratic); Unopposed
Louisiana 3	Patrick T. Caffery	Democratic	1968	Incumbent retired. Republican gain.	✓ Dave Treen (Republican) 54.0%; J. Louis Watkins Jr. (Democratic) 46.0%
Louisiana 4	Joe Waggonner	Democratic	1961	Incumbent re-elected.	✓ Joe Waggonner (Democratic); Unopposed
Louisiana 5	Otto Passman	Democratic	1946	Incumbent re-elected.	✓ Otto Passman (Democratic); Unopposed
Louisiana 6	John Rarick	Democratic	1966	Incumbent re-elected.	✓ John Rarick (Democratic); Unopposed
Louisiana 7	John Breaux	Democratic	1972 (Special)	Incumbent re-elected.	✓ John Breaux (Democratic); Unopposed
Louisiana 8	Speedy Long	Democratic	1964	Incumbent retired. Democratic hold.	✓ Gillis William Long (Democratic) 68.5%; S. R. Abramson (American) 16.8%; Roy C. Strickland (Republican) 14.6%

== Maine ==
District	Incumbent			This race	
District	Member	Party	First elected	Results	Candidates
Maine 1	Peter Kyros	Democratic	1966	Incumbent re-elected.	✓ Peter Kyros (Democratic) 59.4%; L. Robert Porteous Jr. (Republican) 40.6%
Maine 2	William Hathaway	Democratic	1964	Incumbent retired to run for U.S. senator. Republican gain.	✓ William Cohen (Republican) 54.4%; Elmer H. Violette (Democratic) 45.6%

== Maryland ==
Maryland's redistricting eliminated a seat in Baltimore in favor of an additional seat in the DC suburbs.

District	Incumbent			This race	
District	Member	Party	First elected	Results	Candidates
Maryland 1	William Oswald Mills	Republican	1971 (Special)	Incumbent re-elected.	✓ William Oswald Mills (Republican) 70.5%; John R. Hargreaves (Democratic) 29.5%
Maryland 2	Clarence Long	Democratic	1962	Incumbent re-elected.	✓ Clarence Long (Democratic) 65.8%; John J. Bishop Jr. (Republican) 34.2%
Maryland 3	Edward Garmatz	Democratic	1947 (Special)	Incumbent retired. Democratic loss.	✓ Paul Sarbanes (Democratic) 69.7%; Robert D. Morrow (Republican) 30.3%
Maryland 3	Paul Sarbanes; Redistricted from the 4th district	Democratic	1970	Incumbent re-elected.	✓ Paul Sarbanes (Democratic) 69.7%; Robert D. Morrow (Republican) 30.3%
Maryland 4	None (district created)			New seat. Republican gain.	✓ Marjorie Holt (Republican) 59.4%; Werner Fornos (Democratic) 40.6%
Maryland 5	Lawrence Hogan	Republican	1968	Incumbent re-elected.	✓ Lawrence Hogan (Republican) 62.9%; Edward T. Conroy (Democratic) 37.1%
Maryland 6	Goodloe Byron	Democratic	1970	Incumbent re-elected.	✓ Goodloe Byron (Democratic) 64.8%; Edward J. Mason (Republican) 35.2%
Maryland 7	Parren Mitchell	Democratic	1970	Incumbent re-elected.	✓ Parren Mitchell (Democratic) 80.0%; Verdell Adair (Republican) 20.0%
Maryland 8	Gilbert Gude	Republican	1966	Incumbent re-elected.	✓ Gilbert Gude (Republican) 63.9%; Joseph G. Anastasi (Democratic) 36.1%

== Massachusetts ==
Massachusetts' results

District	Incumbent			This race	
District	Member	Party	First elected	Results	Candidates
Massachusetts 1	Silvio O. Conte	Republican	1958	Incumbent re-elected.	✓ Silvio O. Conte (Republican); Unopposed
Massachusetts 2	Edward Boland	Democratic	1952	Incumbent re-elected.	✓ Edward Boland (Democratic); Unopposed
Massachusetts 3	Harold Donohue; Redistricted from the 4th district	Democratic	1946	Incumbent re-elected.	✓ Harold Donohue (Democratic); Unopposed
Massachusetts 4	Robert Drinan; Redistricted from the 3rd district	Democratic	1970	Incumbent re-elected.	✓ Robert Drinan (Democratic) 49.6%; Martin A. Linsky (Republican) 45.0%; John Collins (Ind Con) 5.4%
Massachusetts 5	F. Bradford Morse	Republican	1960	Resigned when appointed to United Nations. Republican hold.	✓ Paul W. Cronin (Republican) 53.4%; John Kerry (Democratic) 44.7%; Roger Durkin (Independent) 1.8%
Massachusetts 6	Michael J. Harrington	Democratic	1969 (Special)	Incumbent re-elected.	✓ Michael J. Harrington (Democratic) 64.1%; James Brady Moseley (Republican) 35.9%
Massachusetts 7	Torbert Macdonald	Democratic	1954	Incumbent re-elected.	✓ Torbert Macdonald (Democratic) 67.7%; Joan M. Aliberti (Republican) 32.3%
Massachusetts 8	Tip O'Neill	Democratic	1952	Incumbent re-elected.	✓ Tip O'Neill (Democratic) 88.7%; John Powers (Socialist Workers) 11.3%
Massachusetts 9	Louise Day Hicks	Democratic	1970	Incumbent lost re-election. Independent Democratic gain.	✓ Joe Moakley (Independent Democratic) 43.2%; Louise Day Hicks (Democratic) 41.1%; Howard M. Miller (Republican) 14.2%; Jeanne Lafferty (Independent) 1.5%
Massachusetts 10	Margaret Heckler	Republican	1966	Incumbent re-elected.	✓ Margaret Heckler (Republican); Unopposed
Massachusetts 11	James A. Burke	Democratic	1958	Incumbent re-elected.	✓ James A. Burke (Democratic); Unopposed
Massachusetts 12	Hastings Keith	Republican	1958	Incumbent retired. Democratic gain.	✓ Gerry Studds (Democratic) 50.3%; William D. Weeks (Republican) 49.7%

== Michigan ==
District	Incumbent			This race	
District	Member	Party	First elected	Results	Candidates
Michigan 1	John Conyers Jr.	Democratic	1964	Incumbent re-elected.	✓ John Conyers Jr. (Democratic) 88.4%; Walter F. Girardot (Republican) 10.8%; Nina J. Hubbard (American Independent) 0.5%; Maceo Carl Dixon (Socialist Workers) 0.2%
Michigan 2	Marvin L. Esch	Republican	1966	Incumbent re-elected.	✓ Marvin L. Esch (Republican) 56.0%; Marvin R. Stempien (Democratic) 43.3%; Henry W. Kroes Jr. (American Independent) 0.7%
Michigan 3	Garry E. Brown	Republican	1966	Incumbent re-elected.	✓ Garry E. Brown (Republican) 59.2%; James T. Brignall (Democratic) 39.9%; Marvin P. Lightvoet (American Independent) 0.9%
Michigan 4	J. Edward Hutchinson	Republican	1962	Incumbent re-elected.	✓ J. Edward Hutchinson (Republican) 67.3%; Charles Jameson (Democratic) 32.7%
Michigan 5	Gerald Ford	Republican	1948	Incumbent re-elected.	✓ Gerald Ford (Republican) 61.1%; Jean McKee (Democratic) 37.7%; Dwight W. Johnson (American Independent) 1.1%; Frank Girard (Soc-Lab) 0.1%; Alan Lee Maki (Communist) 0.07%
Michigan 6	Charles E. Chamberlain	Republican	1956	Incumbent re-elected.	✓ Charles E. Chamberlain (Republican) 50.6%; Milton Robert Carr (Democratic) 49.4%
Michigan 7	Donald Riegle	Republican	1966	Incumbent re-elected.	✓ Donald Riegle (Republican) 70.1%; Eugene L. Mattison (Democratic) 29.9%
Michigan 8	R. James Harvey	Republican	1960	Incumbent re-elected.	✓ R. James Harvey (Republican) 59.3%; Jerome T. Hart (Democratic) 39.4%; John B. Lipinski (American Independent) 1.3%
Michigan 9	Guy Vander Jagt	Republican	1966	Incumbent re-elected.	✓ Guy Vander Jagt (Republican) 69.4%; Lawrence H. Olson (Democratic) 29.5%; DeLoyd G. Hesselink (American Independent) 1.1%
Michigan 10	Elford Albin Cederberg	Republican	1952	Incumbent re-elected.	✓ Elford Albin Cederberg (Republican) 66.7%; Benjamin D. Graves (Democratic) 30.9%; Richard Friske (American Independent) 2.4%
Michigan 11	Philip Ruppe	Republican	1966	Incumbent re-elected.	✓ Philip Ruppe (Republican) 69.4%; James E. McNamara (Democratic) 29.8%; James P. Hoy (American Independent) 0.8%
Michigan 12	James G. O'Hara	Democratic	1958	Incumbent re-elected.	✓ James G. O'Hara (Democratic) 50.8%; David M. Serotkin (Republican) 49.2%
Michigan 13	Charles Diggs	Democratic	1954	Incumbent re-elected.	✓ Charles Diggs (Democratic) 85.6%; Leonard T. Edwards (Republican) 13.3%; Raymond D. Moon (American Independent) 0.6%; Nanci Kinker (Socialist Workers) 0.4%
Michigan 14	Lucien Nedzi	Democratic	1961 (Special)	Incumbent re-elected.	✓ Lucien Nedzi (Democratic) 54.9%; Robert V. McGrath (Republican) 45.1%
Michigan 15	William D. Ford	Democratic	1964	Incumbent re-elected.	✓ William D. Ford (Democratic) 65.8%; Ernest C. Fackler (Republican) 32.9%; Aldi C. Fuhrmann (American Independent) 1.3%
Michigan 16	John D. Dingell Jr.	Democratic	1955 (Special)	Incumbent re-elected.	✓ John D. Dingell Jr. (Democratic) 68.1%; William E. Rostron (Republican) 29.8%; Peter P. Gayner (American Independent) 2.2%
Michigan 17	Martha W. Griffiths	Democratic	1954	Incumbent re-elected.	✓ Martha W. Griffiths (Democratic) 66.4%; Ralph E. Judd (Republican) 32.5%; Hector M. McGregor (American Independent) 0.8%; Christy L. Wallace (Socialist Workers) 0.3%
Michigan 18	None (district created)			New seat. Republican gain.	✓ Robert J. Huber (Republican) 52.6%; Daniel S. Cooper (Democratic) 47.4%
Michigan 19	Jack H. McDonald	Republican	1966	Incumbent lost renomination. Republican loss.	✓ William Broomfield (Republican) 70.4%; George Montgomery (Democratic) 28.6%; Henry Lloyd George (American Independent) 1.0%
Michigan 19	William Broomfield; Redistricted from the 18th district	Republican	1956	Incumbent re-elected.	✓ William Broomfield (Republican) 70.4%; George Montgomery (Democratic) 28.6%; Henry Lloyd George (American Independent) 1.0%

== Minnesota ==
District	Incumbent			This race	
District	Member	Party	First elected	Results	Candidates
Minnesota 1	Al Quie	Republican	1958	Incumbent re-elected.	✓ Al Quie (Republican) 70.7%; Charles S. Thompson (Democratic (DFL)) 29.3%
Minnesota 2	Ancher Nelsen	Republican	1958	Incumbent re-elected.	✓ Ancher Nelsen (Republican) 57.1%; Charlie Turnbull (Democratic (DFL)) 42.9%
Minnesota 3	Bill Frenzel	Republican	1970	Incumbent re-elected.	✓ Bill Frenzel (Republican) 62.9%; Jim Bell (Democratic (DFL)) 31.3%; Donald H. Wright (Taxpayers) 5.8%
Minnesota 4	Joseph Karth	Democratic (DFL)	1958	Incumbent re-elected.	✓ Joseph Karth (Democratic (DFL)) 72.4%; Steve Thompson (Republican) 27.6%
Minnesota 5	Donald M. Fraser	Democratic (DFL)	1962	Incumbent re-elected.	✓ Donald M. Fraser (Democratic (DFL)) 65.8%; Allan Davisson (Republican) 24.4%; Norm Selby (Taxpayers) 7.7%; William E. Peterson (Socialist Workers) 2.1%
Minnesota 6	John M. Zwach	Republican	1966	Incumbent re-elected.	✓ John M. Zwach (Republican) 51.0%; Rick Nolan (Democratic (DFL)) 49.0%
Minnesota 7	Robert Bergland	Democratic (DFL)	1970	Incumbent re-elected.	✓ Robert Bergland (Democratic (DFL)) 59.0%; Jon O. Haaven (Republican) 41.0%
Minnesota 8	John Blatnik	Democratic (DFL)	1946	Incumbent re-elected.	✓ John Blatnik (Democratic (DFL)) 75.9%; Edward Johnson (Republican) 24.1%

== Mississippi ==
District	Incumbent			This race	
District	Member	Party	First elected	Results	Candidates
Mississippi 1	Jamie Whitten; Redistricted from the 2nd district	Democratic	1941 (Special)	Incumbent re-elected.	✓ Jamie Whitten (Democratic); Unopposed
Mississippi 2	Thomas Abernethy; Redistricted from the 1st district	Democratic	1942	Incumbent retired. Democratic hold.	✓ David R. Bowen (Democratic) 61.9%; Carl Butler (Republican) 34.7%; Robert J. Coleman (Independent) 2.5%; Norman Smith (Independent) 0.9%
Mississippi 3	Sonny Montgomery; Redistricted from the 4th district	Democratic	1966	Incumbent re-elected.	✓ Sonny Montgomery (Democratic); Unopposed
Mississippi 4	Charles H. Griffin; Redistricted from the 3rd district	Democratic	1968	Incumbent retired. Republican gain.	✓ Thad Cochran (Republican) 47.9%; Ellis B. Bodron (Democratic) 44.0%; Eddie L. McBride (Independent) 8.2%
Mississippi 5	William M. Colmer	Democratic	1932	Incumbent retired. Republican gain.	✓ Trent Lott (Republican) 55.3%; Ben Stone (Democratic) 44.2%; Earnest J. Creel (Independent) 0.5%

== Missouri ==
District	Incumbent			This race	
District	Member	Party	First elected	Results	Candidates
Missouri 1	Bill Clay	Democratic	1968	Incumbent re-elected.	✓ Bill Clay (Democratic) 64.0%; Richard O. Funsch (Republican) 36.0%
Missouri 2	James W. Symington	Democratic	1968	Incumbent re-elected.	✓ James W. Symington (Democratic) 63.5%; John W. 'Jack' Cooper Jr. (Republican) 36.5%
Missouri 3	Leonor Sullivan	Democratic	1952	Incumbent re-elected.	✓ Leonor Sullivan (Democratic) 69.3%; Albert Holst (Republican) 30.4%; Charles H. Byford (Independent) 0.3%
Missouri 4	William J. Randall	Democratic	1959 (Special)	Incumbent re-elected.	✓ William J. Randall (Democratic) 57.4%; Raymond E. Barrows (Republican) 42.6%
Missouri 5	Richard Walker Bolling	Democratic	1948	Incumbent re-elected.	✓ Richard Walker Bolling (Democratic) 62.8%; Vernon E. Rice (Republican) 35.6%; Stella Sollars (Independent) 1.6%
Missouri 6	William Raleigh Hull Jr.	Democratic	1954	Incumbent retired. Democratic hold.	✓ Jerry Litton (Democratic) 54.6%; Russell Sloan (Republican) 45.4%
Missouri 7	Durward Gorham Hall	Republican	1960	Incumbent retired. Republican hold.	✓ Gene Taylor (Republican) 63.7%; Bill Thomas (Democratic) 36.3%
Missouri 8	Richard Howard Ichord Jr.	Democratic	1960	Incumbent re-elected.	✓ Richard Howard Ichord Jr. (Democratic) 62.1%; David R. Countie (Republican) 37.9%
Missouri 9	William L. Hungate	Democratic	1964	Incumbent re-elected.	✓ William L. Hungate (Democratic) 66.5%; Robert L. Prange (Republican) 33.5%
Missouri 10	Bill Burlison	Democratic	1968	Incumbent re-elected.	✓ Bill Burlison (Democratic) 64.3%; Marion Francis Svendrowski (Republican) 35.7%

== Montana ==
District	Incumbent			This race	
District	Member	Party	First elected	Results	Candidates
Montana 1	Richard G. Shoup	Republican	1970	Incumbent re-elected.	✓ Richard G. Shoup (Republican) 53.7%; Arnold Olsen (Democratic) 46.3%
Montana 2	John Melcher	Democratic	1969 (Special)	Incumbent re-elected.	✓ John Melcher (Democratic) 76.1%; Dick Forester (Republican) 23.9%

== Nebraska ==
District	Incumbent			This race	
District	Member	Party	First elected	Results	Candidates
Nebraska 1	Charles Thone	Republican	1970	Incumbent re-elected.	✓ Charles Thone (Republican) 64.2%; Darrel E. Berg (Democratic) 35.8%
Nebraska 2	John Y. McCollister	Republican	1970	Incumbent re-elected.	✓ John Y. McCollister (Republican) 63.9%; Patrick L. Cooney (Democratic) 36.1%
Nebraska 3	David Martin	Republican	1960	Incumbent re-elected.	✓ David Martin (Republican) 69.6%; Warren Fitzgerald (Democratic) 30.4%

== Nevada ==
District	Incumbent			This race	
District	Member	Party	First elected	Results	Candidates
Nevada at-large	Walter S. Baring Jr.	Democratic	1948; 1952 (defeated); 1956	Incumbent lost renomination. Republican gain.	✓ David Towell (Republican) 52.2%; James Bilbray (Democratic) 47.8%

== New Hampshire ==
District	Incumbent			This race	
District	Member	Party	First elected	Results	Candidates
New Hampshire 1	Louis C. Wyman	Republican	1962; 1964 (defeated); 1966	Incumbent re-elected.	✓ Louis C. Wyman (Republican) 72.9%; Chester Earl Merrow (Democratic) 27.1%
New Hampshire 2	James Colgate Cleveland	Republican	1962	Incumbent re-elected.	✓ James Colgate Cleveland (Republican) 67.9%; Charles B. Officer (Democratic) 32.1%

== New Jersey ==
District	Incumbent			This race	
District	Member	Party	First elected	Results	Candidates
New Jersey 1	John E. Hunt	Republican	1966	Incumbent re-elected.	✓ John E. Hunt (Republican) 52.5%; James Florio (Democratic) 47.0%; Raymond V. S. Miller (Independent) 0.2%; Dominic W. Doganiero (Soc-Lab) 0.1%; Gerrit Hoogenrad (Socialist) 0.1%
New Jersey 2	Charles W. Sandman Jr.	Republican	1966	Incumbent re-elected.	✓ Charles W. Sandman Jr. (Republican) 65.7%; John D. Rose (Democratic) 34.3%
New Jersey 3	James J. Howard	Democratic	1964	Incumbent re-elected.	✓ James J. Howard (Democratic) 53.0%; William F. Dowd (Republican) 47.0%
New Jersey 4	Frank Thompson	Democratic	1954	Incumbent re-elected.	✓ Frank Thompson (Democratic) 58.0%; Peter P. Garibaldi (Republican) 42.0%
New Jersey 5	Peter Frelinghuysen Jr.	Republican	1952	Incumbent re-elected.	✓ Peter Frelinghuysen Jr. (Republican) 62.0%; Frederick M. Bohen (Democratic) 38.0%
New Jersey 6	Edwin B. Forsythe	Republican	1970	Incumbent re-elected.	✓ Edwin B. Forsythe (Republican) 62.8%; Francis P. Brennan (Democratic) 36.1%; Ida C. Ebert (Independent) 0.6%; Bernardo S. Doganiero (Soc-Lab) 0.5%
New Jersey 7	William B. Widnall	Republican	1950	Incumbent re-elected.	✓ William B. Widnall (Republican) 57.9%; Arthur J. Lesemann (Democratic) 39.9%; Martin E. Wendelken (Independent) 2.1%
New Jersey 8	Robert A. Roe	Democratic	1970	Incumbent re-elected.	✓ Robert A. Roe (Democratic) 63.1%; Walter E. Johnson (Republican) 36.9%
New Jersey 9	Henry Helstoski	Democratic	1964	Incumbent re-elected.	✓ Henry Helstoski (Democratic) 55.8%; Alfred D. Schiaffo (Republican) 44.2%
New Jersey 10	Peter W. Rodino	Democratic	1948	Incumbent re-elected.	✓ Peter W. Rodino (Democratic) 79.7%; Kenneth C. Miller (Republican) 20.3%
New Jersey 11	Joseph Minish	Democratic	1962	Incumbent re-elected.	✓ Joseph Minish (Democratic) 57.5%; Milton A. Waldor (Republican) 39.7%; Philip R. Nicolaus (Independent) 1.5%; James R. Klimaski (Peoples) 1.3%
New Jersey 12	Florence P. Dwyer	Republican	1956	Incumbent retired. Republican hold.	✓ Matthew John Rinaldo (Republican) 63.5%; Jerry Fitzgerald English (Democratic) 36.2%; Stanley Bogus (Independent) 0.4%
New Jersey 13	None (district created)			New seat. Republican gain.	✓ Joseph J. Maraziti (Republican) 55.7%; Helen Stevenson Meyner (Democratic) 42.9%; Samuel Golub (Independent) 1.4%
New Jersey 14	Dominick V. Daniels	Democratic	1958	Incumbent re-elected.	✓ Dominick V. Daniels (Democratic) 61.2%; Richard T. Bozzone (Republican) 34.3%; Edward F. Zampella (Independent) 3.1%; Perfecto Oyola (Independent) 0.9%; Vincent J. Carrino (Independent) 0.5%
New Jersey 14	Cornelius Gallagher; Redistricted from the 13th district	Democratic	1958	Incumbent lost renomination. Democratic loss.	✓ Dominick V. Daniels (Democratic) 61.2%; Richard T. Bozzone (Republican) 34.3%; Edward F. Zampella (Independent) 3.1%; Perfecto Oyola (Independent) 0.9%; Vincent J. Carrino (Independent) 0.5%
New Jersey 15	Edward J. Patten	Democratic	1962	Incumbent re-elected.	✓ Edward J. Patten (Democratic) 52.3%; Fuller H. Brooks (Republican) 47.7%

== New Mexico ==
District	Incumbent			This race	
District	Member	Party	First elected	Results	Candidates
New Mexico 1	Manuel Lujan Jr.	Republican	1968	Incumbent re-elected.	✓ Manuel Lujan Jr. (Republican) 55.7%; Eugene Gallegos (Democratic) 44.3%
New Mexico 2	Harold L. Runnels	Democratic	1970	Incumbent re-elected.	✓ Harold L. Runnels (Democratic) 72.2%; George E. Presson (Republican) 27.8%

== New York ==
District	Incumbent			This race	
District	Member	Party	First elected	Results	Candidates
New York 1	Otis G. Pike	Democratic	1960	Incumbent re-elected.	✓ Otis G. Pike (Democratic) 52.5%; Joseph H. Boyd Jr. (Republican) 36.9%; Robert D. L. Gardiner (Conservative) 9.5%; Robert P. Samek (Liberal) 1.1%
New York 2	James R. Grover Jr.	Republican	1962	Incumbent re-elected.	✓ James R. Grover Jr. (Republican) 65.8%; Fern Coste Dennison (Democratic) 32.7%; Robert Atlas (Liberal) 1.5%
New York 3	None (district created)			New seat. Republican gain.	✓ Angelo D. Roncallo (Republican) 53.1%; Carter F. Bales (Democratic) 37.6%; Lawrence P. Russo (Conservative) 7.6%; Leo E. James (Liberal) 1.7%
New York 4	Norman F. Lent; Redistricted from the 5th district	Republican	1970	Incumbent re-elected.	✓ Norman F. Lent (Republican) 62.4%; Elaine B. Horowitz (Democratic) 36.0%; Aaron M. Schein (Liberal) 1.7%
New York 5	John W. Wydler; Redistricted from the 4th district	Republican	1962	Incumbent re-elected.	✓ John W. Wydler (Republican) 62.4%; Ferne M. Steckler (Democratic) 31.7%; Vincent A. Joy (Conservative) 3.6%; Paul F. Harper (Liberal) 1.8%; Hedda Garza (Socialist Workers) 0.4%
New York 6	Seymour Halpern	Republican	1958	Incumbent retired. Republican loss.	✓ Lester L. Wolff (Democratic) 51.5%; John T. Gallagher (Republican) 48.5%
New York 6	Lester L. Wolff; Redistricted from the 3rd district	Democratic	1964	Incumbent re-elected.	✓ Lester L. Wolff (Democratic) 51.5%; John T. Gallagher (Republican) 48.5%
New York 7	Joseph P. Addabbo	Democratic	1960	Incumbent re-elected.	✓ Joseph P. Addabbo (Democratic) 75.0%; John E. Hall (Republican) 20.6%; Frank O. Wuertz (Conservative) 4.4%
New York 8	Benjamin Stanley Rosenthal	Democratic	1962	Incumbent re-elected.	✓ Benjamin Stanley Rosenthal (Democratic) 64.7%; Frank LaPina (Republican) 35.3%
New York 9	James J. Delaney	Democratic	1944; 1946 (defeated); 1948	Incumbent re-elected.	✓ James J. Delaney (Democratic) 93.4%; Loretta R. Gressey (Liberal) 6.6%
New York 10	Mario Biaggi; Redistricted from the 24th district	Democratic	1968	Incumbent re-elected.	✓ Mario Biaggi (Democratic) 93.9%; Michael S. Bank (Liberal) 6.1%
New York 11	Frank J. Brasco	Democratic	1966	Incumbent re-elected.	✓ Frank J. Brasco (Democratic) 63.9%; Melvin Solomon (Republican) 31.3%; Jessie I. Levine (Liberal) 4.8%
New York 12	Shirley Chisholm	Democratic	1968	Incumbent re-elected.	✓ Shirley Chisholm (Democratic) 87.9%; John Coleman (Republican) 9.7%; Martin S. Shepherd Jr. (Conservative) 1.6%; John C. Hawkins (Socialist Workers) 0.7%
New York 13	Bertram L. Podell	Democratic	1968	Incumbent re-elected.	✓ Bertram L. Podell (Democratic) 65.2%; Joseph F. Marcucci (Republican) 25.5%; Leonard M. Simon (Liberal) 5.3%; Michael P. Gioia (Communist) 4.1%
New York 14	John J. Rooney	Democratic	1944	Incumbent re-elected.	✓ John J. Rooney (Democratic) 53.9%; Allard K. Lowenstein (Liberal) 28.1%; Francis J. Voyticky (Republican) 17.5%; James Mendietta (Socialist Workers) 0.5%
New York 15	Hugh Carey	Democratic	1960	Incumbent re-elected.	✓ Hugh Carey (Democratic) 52.2%; John F. Gangemi (Republican) 43.0%; Franklin C. Jones (Conservative) 3.3%; Carl Saks (Liberal) 1.6%
New York 16	Emanuel Celler; Redistricted from the 10th district	Democratic	1922	Incumbent lost renomination and lost re-election as a Liberal. Democratic hold.	✓ Elizabeth Holtzman (Democratic) 65.6%; Nicholas R. Macchio Jr. (Republican) 22.9%; Emanuel Celler (Liberal) 7.0%; William Sampol (Conservative) 4.6%
New York 17	John M. Murphy; Redistricted from the 16th district	Democratic	1962	Incumbent re-elected.	✓ John M. Murphy (Democratic) 60.3%; Mario D. Belardino (Republican) 39.7%
New York 18	Ed Koch; Redistricted from the 17th district	Democratic	1968	Incumbent re-elected.	✓ Ed Koch (Democratic) 69.9%; Jane Pickens Langley (Republican) 29.3%; Rebecca Finch (Socialist Workers) 0.8%
New York 19	Charles B. Rangel; Redistricted from the 18th district	Democratic	1970	Incumbent re-elected.	✓ Charles B. Rangel (Democratic) 96.0%; Marshall L. Dodge III (Conservative) 2.3%; Bobby R. Washington (Socialist Workers) 0.9%; Jose Stevens (Communist) 0.8%
New York 20	William Fitts Ryan	Democratic	1960	Died in office. Democratic loss.	✓ Bella Abzug (Democratic) 55.7%; Priscilla Ryan (Liberal) 28.0%; Annette Flatto Levy (Republican) 11.7%; Harvey J. Michelman (Conservative) 4.1%; Joanna Misnik (Socialist Workers) 0.4%
New York 20	Bella Abzug; Redistricted from the 19th district	Democratic	1970	Incumbent re-elected.	✓ Bella Abzug (Democratic) 55.7%; Priscilla Ryan (Liberal) 28.0%; Annette Flatto Levy (Republican) 11.7%; Harvey J. Michelman (Conservative) 4.1%; Joanna Misnik (Socialist Workers) 0.4%
New York 21	Herman Badillo	Democratic	1970	Incumbent re-elected.	✓ Herman Badillo (Democratic) 86.9%; Manuel A. Ramos (Republican) 11.4%; Lillian Immediato (Conservative) 1.7%
New York 22	James H. Scheuer	Democratic	1964	Incumbent lost renomination. Democratic loss.	✓ Jonathan Brewster Bingham (Democratic) 76.5%; Charles A. Averello (Republican) 23.5%
New York 22	Jonathan Brewster Bingham; Redistricted from the 23rd district	Democratic	1964	Incumbent re-elected.	✓ Jonathan Brewster Bingham (Democratic) 76.5%; Charles A. Averello (Republican) 23.5%
New York 23	Peter A. Peyser; Redistricted from the 25th district	Republican	1970	Incumbent re-elected.	✓ Peter A. Peyser (Republican) 50.4%; Richard Ottinger (Democratic) 49.6%
New York 24	Ogden R. Reid; Redistricted from the 26th district	Democratic	1962 (Note: Reid was originally elected as a Republican. He switched parties in 1972.)	Incumbent re-elected.	✓ Ogden R. Reid (Democratic) 52.2%; Carl A. Vergari (Republican) 47.8%
New York 25	Hamilton Fish IV; Redistricted from the 28th district	Republican	1968	Incumbent re-elected.	✓ Hamilton Fish IV (Republican) 71.6%; John Burns III (Democratic) 26.9%; Robert P. Falisey (Liberal) 1.4%
New York 26	John G. Dow; Redistricted from the 27th district	Democratic	1964; 1968 (defeated); 1970	Incumbent lost re-election. Republican gain.	✓ Benjamin A. Gilman (Republican) 47.7%; John G. Dow (Democratic) 39.3%; Yale Rapkin (Conservative) 12.9%
New York 27	Howard W. Robison; Redistricted from the 33rd district	Republican	1958	Incumbent re-elected.	✓ Howard W. Robison (Republican) 62.2%; David H. Blazer (Democratic) 29.8%; Patrick M. O'Neil (Conservative) 5.2%; William J. Osby (Liberal) 2.9%
New York 28	Samuel S. Stratton; Redistricted from the 29th district	Democratic	1958	Incumbent re-elected.	✓ Samuel S. Stratton (Democratic) 80.0%; John F. Ryan Jr. (Republican) 20.0%
New York 29	Carleton J. King; Redistricted from the 30th district	Republican	1960	Incumbent re-elected.	✓ Carleton J. King (Republican) 69.9%; Harold B. Gordon (Democratic) 30.1%
New York 30	Robert C. McEwen; Redistricted from the 31st district	Republican	1964	Incumbent re-elected.	✓ Robert C. McEwen (Republican) 66.0%; Ernest J. Labaff (Democratic) 34.0%
New York 31	Alexander Pirnie; Redistricted from the 32nd district	Republican	1958	Incumbent retired. Republican hold.	✓ Donald J. Mitchell (Republican) 51.0%; Robert Castle (Democratic) 39.1%; Franklin Nichols (Action) 6.2%; John T. Buckley (Liberal) 3.7%
New York 32	James M. Hanley; Redistricted from the 35th district	Democratic	1964	Incumbent re-elected.	✓ James M. Hanley (Democratic) 57.2%; Leonard C. Koldin (Republican) 42.8%
New York 33	John H. Terry; Redistricted from the 34th district	Republican	1970	Incumbent retired. Republican hold.	✓ William F. Walsh (Republican) 71.4%; Clarence Kadys (Democratic) 28.6%
New York 34	Frank Horton; Redistricted from the 36th district	Republican	1962	Incumbent re-elected.	✓ Frank Horton (Republican) 72.1%; Jack Rubens (Democratic) 23.5%; Richard E. Lusink (Conservative) 2.8%; Rafael Martinez (Liberal) 1.6%
New York 35	Barber Conable; Redistricted from the 37th district	Republican	1964	Incumbent re-elected.	✓ Barber Conable (Republican) 67.9%; Terence J. Spencer (Democratic) 28.4%; Terence C. Brennan (Conservative) 2.6%; Alicia Burgos (Liberal) 1.1%
New York 36	Henry P. Smith III; Redistricted from the 40th district	Republican	1964	Incumbent re-elected.	✓ Henry P. Smith III (Republican) 57.3%; Max McCarthy (Democratic) 42.7%
New York 37	Thaddeus J. Dulski; Redistricted from the 41st district	Democratic	1958	Incumbent re-elected.	✓ Thaddeus J. Dulski (Democratic) 72.2%; William F. McLaughlin (Republican) 27.8%
New York 38	Jack Kemp; Redistricted from the 39th district	Republican	1970	Incumbent re-elected.	✓ Jack Kemp (Republican) 73.2%; Anthony P. LoRusso (Democratic) 26.8%
New York 39	James F. Hastings; Redistricted from the 38th district	Republican	1968	Incumbent re-elected.	✓ James F. Hastings (Republican) 71.9%; Wilbur White Jr. (Democratic) 28.1%

== North Carolina ==
District	Incumbent			This race	
District	Member	Party	First elected	Results	Candidates
North Carolina 1	Walter B. Jones Sr.	Democratic	1966	Incumbent re-elected.	✓ Walter B. Jones Sr. (Democratic) 68.8%; J. Jordan Bonner (Republican) 31.2%
North Carolina 2	Lawrence H. Fountain	Democratic	1952	Incumbent re-elected.	✓ Lawrence H. Fountain (Democratic) 71.6%; Erick P. Little (Republican) 28.4%
North Carolina 3	David N. Henderson	Democratic	1960	Incumbent re-elected.	✓ David N. Henderson (Democratic); Unopposed
North Carolina 4	Nick Galifianakis	Democratic	1966	Retired to run for U.S. senator. Democratic hold.	✓ Ike Franklin Andrews (Democratic) 50.4%; Jack Hawke (Republican) 49.6%
North Carolina 5	Wilmer Mizell	Republican	1968	Incumbent re-elected.	✓ Wilmer Mizell (Republican) 64.8%; Brooks Hays (Democratic) 35.2%
North Carolina 6	L. Richardson Preyer	Democratic	1968	Incumbent re-elected.	✓ L. Richardson Preyer (Democratic) 93.9%; Lynwood Bullock (American) 6.1%
North Carolina 7	Alton Lennon	Democratic	1956	Incumbent retired. Democratic hold.	✓ Charlie Rose (Democratic) 60.4%; Jerry C. Scott (Republican) 38.7%; Alvis H. Ballard (American) 0.9%
North Carolina 8	Earl B. Ruth	Republican	1968	Incumbent re-elected.	✓ Earl B. Ruth (Republican) 60.2%; Richard Clark (Democratic) 39.8%
North Carolina 9	Charles R. Jonas	Republican	1952	Incumbent retired. Republican hold.	✓ James G. Martin (Republican) 58.9%; James Beatty (Democratic) 41.1%
North Carolina 10	Jim Broyhill	Republican	1962	Incumbent re-elected.	✓ Jim Broyhill (Republican) 72.5%; Paul L. Beck (Democratic) 27.5%
North Carolina 11	Roy A. Taylor	Democratic	1960	Incumbent re-elected.	✓ Roy A. Taylor (Democratic) 59.6%; Jesse I. Ledbetter (Republican) 40.4%

== North Dakota ==
District	Incumbent			This race	
District	Member	Party	First elected	Results	Candidates
North Dakota at-large	Mark Andrews; Redistricted from the 1st district	Republican	1963 (Special)	Incumbent re-elected.	✓ Mark Andrews (Republican) 72.7%; Richard Ista (Democratic) 27.1%; Kenneth C. Gardner (Independent) 0.2%
North Dakota at-large	Arthur A. Link; Redistricted from the 2nd district	Democratic	1970	Incumbent retired to run for governor. Democratic loss.	✓ Mark Andrews (Republican) 72.7%; Richard Ista (Democratic) 27.1%; Kenneth C. Gardner (Independent) 0.2%

== Ohio ==
District	Incumbent			This race	
District	Member	Party	First elected	Results	Candidates
Ohio 1	William J. Keating	Republican	1970	Incumbent re-elected.	✓ William J. Keating (Republican) 70.3%; Karl F. Heiser (Democratic) 29.7%
Ohio 2	Donald D. Clancy	Republican	1960	Incumbent re-elected.	✓ Donald D. Clancy (Republican) 62.8%; Penny Manes (Democratic) 37.2%
Ohio 3	Charles W. Whalen Jr.	Republican	1966	Incumbent re-elected.	✓ Charles W. Whalen Jr. (Republican) 76.2%; John W. Lelak Jr. (Democratic) 23.8%
Ohio 4	William Moore McCulloch	Republican	1947 (Special)	Incumbent retired. Republican hold.	✓ Tennyson Guyer (Republican) 62.7%; Dimitri Nicholas (Democratic) 37.3%
Ohio 4	Jackson Edward Betts; Redistricted from the 8th district	Republican	1950	Incumbent retired. Republican loss.	✓ Tennyson Guyer (Republican) 62.7%; Dimitri Nicholas (Democratic) 37.3%
Ohio 5	Del Latta	Republican	1958	Incumbent re-elected.	✓ Del Latta (Republican) 72.7%; Bruce Edwards (Democratic) 27.3%
Ohio 6	Bill Harsha	Republican	1960	Incumbent re-elected.	✓ Bill Harsha (Republican); Unopposed
Ohio 7	Clarence J. Brown Jr.	Republican	1965 (Special)	Incumbent re-elected.	✓ Clarence J. Brown Jr. (Republican) 73.3%; Dorothy Franke (Independent) 26.7%
Ohio 8	Walter E. Powell; Redistricted from the 24th district	Republican	1970	Incumbent re-elected.	✓ Walter E. Powell (Republican) 52.2%; James D. Ruppert (Democratic) 47.8%
Ohio 9	Thomas L. Ashley	Democratic	1954	Incumbent re-elected.	✓ Thomas L. Ashley (Democratic) 69.1%; Joseph C. Richards (Republican) 30.9%
Ohio 10	Clarence E. Miller	Republican	1966	Incumbent re-elected.	✓ Clarence E. Miller (Republican) 73.2%; Robert H. Whealey (Democratic) 26.8%
Ohio 11	J. William Stanton	Republican	1964	Incumbent re-elected.	✓ J. William Stanton (Republican) 68.2%; Dennis M. Callahan (Democratic) 31.8%
Ohio 12	Samuel L. Devine	Republican	1958	Incumbent re-elected.	✓ Samuel L. Devine (Republican) 56.1%; James W. Goodrich (Democratic) 43.9%
Ohio 13	Charles Adams Mosher	Republican	1960	Incumbent re-elected.	✓ Charles Adams Mosher (Republican) 68.1%; John M. Ryan (Democratic) 31.9%
Ohio 14	John F. Seiberling	Democratic	1970	Incumbent re-elected.	✓ John F. Seiberling (Democratic) 74.4%; Norman W. Holt (Republican) 25.6%
Ohio 15	Chalmers P. Wylie	Republican	1966	Incumbent re-elected.	✓ Chalmers P. Wylie (Republican) 65.8%; Manley L. McGee (Democrat) 31.4%; Edward Price (American Independent) 2.7%
Ohio 16	Frank T. Bow	Republican	1950	Incumbent retired. Republican hold.	✓ Ralph Regula (Republican) 57.3%; Virgil L. Musser (Democratic) 42.7%
Ohio 17	John M. Ashbrook	Republican	1960	Incumbent re-elected.	✓ John M. Ashbrook (Republican) 57.4%; Raymond C. Beck (Democratic) 38.7%; Clifford J. Simpson (American Independent) 3.9%
Ohio 18	Wayne L. Hays	Democratic	1948	Incumbent re-elected.	✓ Wayne L. Hays (Democratic) 70.2%; Robert Stewart (Republican) 29.8%
Ohio 19	Charles J. Carney	Democratic	1970	Incumbent re-elected.	✓ Charles J. Carney (Democratic) 64.0%; Norman M. Parr (Republican) 36.0%
Ohio 20	James V. Stanton	Democratic	1970	Incumbent re-elected.	✓ James V. Stanton (Democratic) 84.3%; Thomas E. Vilt (Republican) 11.9%; Richard B. Kay (American Independent) 3.8%
Ohio 21	Louis Stokes	Democratic	1968	Incumbent re-elected.	✓ Louis Stokes (Democratic) 81.1%; James D. Johnson (Republican) 11.3%; Joseph Pirincin (Soc-Lab) 4.7%; Cecil Lampkins (Independent) 2.9%
Ohio 22	Charles Vanik	Democratic	1954	Incumbent re-elected.	✓ Charles Vanik (Democratic) 63.9%; Donald W. Gropp (Republican) 32.6%; Thomas W. Lippitt (American Independent) 1.8%; Caryl A. Loeb (Independent) 1.7%
Ohio 23	William Edwin Minshall Jr.	Republican	1954	Incumbent re-elected.	✓ William Edwin Minshall Jr. (Republican) 49.4%; Dennis Kucinich (Democratic) 47.3%; John O'Neill (Soc-Lab) 1.8%; Frederick D. Lyon (American Independent) 1.5%

== Oklahoma ==
District	Incumbent			This race	
District	Member	Party	First elected	Results	Candidates
Oklahoma 1	Page Belcher	Republican	1950	Incumbent retired. Democratic gain.	✓ James R. Jones (Democratic) 55.5%; James M. Hewgley Jr. (Republican) 44.5%
Oklahoma 2	Ed Edmondson	Democratic	1952	Retired to run for U.S. senator. Democratic hold.	✓ Clem McSpadden (Democratic) 71.1%; Emery H. Toliver (Republican) 28.9%
Oklahoma 3	Carl Albert	Democratic	1946	Incumbent re-elected.	✓ Carl Albert (Democratic) 93.4%; Harold J. Marshall (Independent) 6.6%
Oklahoma 4	Tom Steed	Democratic	1948	Incumbent re-elected.	✓ Tom Steed (Democratic) 71.3%; William E. Crozier (Republican) 28.7%
Oklahoma 5	John Jarman	Democratic	1950	Incumbent re-elected.	✓ John Jarman (Democratic) 60.4%; Llewellyn L. Keller II (Republican) 39.6%
Oklahoma 6	John Newbold Camp	Republican	1968	Incumbent re-elected.	✓ John Newbold Camp (Republican) 72.7%; William Patrick Schmitt (Democratic) 27.3%

== Oregon ==
District	Incumbent			This race	
District	Member	Party	First elected	Results	Candidates
Oregon 1	Wendell Wyatt	Republican	1964	Incumbent re-elected.	✓ Wendell Wyatt (Republican) 68.6%; Ralph E. Bunch (Democratic) 31.4%
Oregon 2	Albert C. Ullman	Democratic	1956	Incumbent re-elected.	✓ Albert C. Ullman (Democratic); Unopposed
Oregon 3	Edith Green	Democratic	1954	Incumbent re-elected.	✓ Edith Green (Democratic) 62.5%; Mike Walsh (Republican) 37.5%
Oregon 4	John R. Dellenback	Republican	1966	Incumbent re-elected.	✓ John R. Dellenback (Republican) 62.6%; Charles O. Porter (Democratic) 37.4%

== Pennsylvania ==
District	Incumbent			This race	
District	Member	Party	First elected	Results	Candidates
Pennsylvania 1	William A. Barrett	Democratic	1944; 1946 (defeated); 1948	Incumbent re-elected.	✓ William A. Barrett (Democratic) 66.1%; Gus A. Pedicone (Republican) 33.2%; Nancy Streve (Socialist Workers) 0.7%
Pennsylvania 2	Robert N. C. Nix Sr.	Democratic	1958	Incumbent re-elected.	✓ Robert N. C. Nix Sr. (Democratic) 70.1%; Frederick D. Bryant (Republican) 29.9%
Pennsylvania 3	James A. Byrne	Democratic	1952	Incumbent lost renomination. Democratic loss.	✓ William J. Green III (Democratic) 63.3%; Alfred Marroletti (Republican) 36.2%; Anthony Monteiro (Communist) 0.5%
Pennsylvania 3	William J. Green III; Redistricted from the 5th district	Democratic	1964	Incumbent re-elected.	✓ William J. Green III (Democratic) 63.3%; Alfred Marroletti (Republican) 36.2%; Anthony Monteiro (Communist) 0.5%
Pennsylvania 4	Joshua Eilberg	Democratic	1966	Incumbent re-elected.	✓ Joshua Eilberg (Democratic) 55.9%; William Pfender (Republican) 44.1%
Pennsylvania 5	John H. Ware III; Redistricted from the 9th district	Republican	1970	Incumbent re-elected.	✓ John H. Ware III (Republican) 64.7%; Brower Yerger (Democratic) 35.3%
Pennsylvania 6	Gus Yatron	Democratic	1968	Incumbent re-elected.	✓ Gus Yatron (Democratic) 64.5%; Eugene W. Hubler (Republican) 34.6%; Frank E. Huet (Const) 1.0%
Pennsylvania 7	Lawrence G. Williams	Republican	1966	Incumbent re-elected.	✓ Lawrence G. Williams (Republican) 60.6%; Stuart S. Bowie (Democratic) 39.4%
Pennsylvania 8	Edward G. Biester Jr.	Republican	1966	Incumbent re-elected.	✓ Edward G. Biester Jr. (Republican) 64.4%; Alan Williams (Democratic) 35.6%
Pennsylvania 9	None (district created)			New seat. Republican gain.	✓ Bud Shuster (Republican) 61.8%; Earl P. Collins (Democratic) 38.2%
Pennsylvania 10	Joseph M. McDade	Republican	1962	Incumbent re-elected.	✓ Joseph M. McDade (Republican) 73.6%; Stanley R. Coveleskie (Democratic) 26.4%
Pennsylvania 11	Daniel J. Flood	Democratic	1944; 1946 (defeated); 1948; 1952 (defeated); 1954	Incumbent re-elected.	✓ Daniel J. Flood (Democratic) 68.3%; Donald B. Ayers (Republican) 31.7%
Pennsylvania 12	J. Irving Whalley	Republican	1960	Incumbent retired. Republican loss.	✓ John P. Saylor (Republican) 68.1%; Joseph Murphy (Democratic) 31.9%
Pennsylvania 12	John P. Saylor; Redistricted from the 22nd district	Republican	1949 (Special)	Incumbent re-elected.	✓ John P. Saylor (Republican) 68.1%; Joseph Murphy (Democratic) 31.9%
Pennsylvania 13	R. Lawrence Coughlin	Republican	1968	Incumbent re-elected.	✓ R. Lawrence Coughlin (Republican) 66.6%; Katherine L. Camp (Democratic) 33.4%
Pennsylvania 14	William S. Moorhead	Democratic	1958	Incumbent re-elected.	✓ William S. Moorhead (Democratic) 59.3%; Roland S. Catarinella (Republican) 40.4%; Ronald N. Henderson (Communist) 0.3%
Pennsylvania 15	Fred B. Rooney	Democratic	1963 (Special)	Incumbent re-elected.	✓ Fred B. Rooney (Democratic) 60.8%; Wardell F. Steigerwalt (Republican) 39.2%
Pennsylvania 16	Edwin D. Eshleman	Republican	1966	Incumbent re-elected.	✓ Edwin D. Eshleman (Republican) 73.5%; Shirley S. Garrett (Democratic) 26.5%
Pennsylvania 17	Herman T. Schneebeli	Republican	1960	Incumbent re-elected.	✓ Herman T. Schneebeli (Republican) 72.2%; Donald J. Rippon (Democratic) 26.6%; Andrew J. Watson (Const) 1.2%
Pennsylvania 18	H. John Heinz III	Republican	1971 (Special)	Incumbent re-elected.	✓ H. John Heinz III (Republican) 72.8%; Douglas Walgren (Democratic) 27.2%
Pennsylvania 19	George Atlee Goodling	Republican	1960; 1964 (defeated); 1966	Incumbent re-elected.	✓ George Atlee Goodling (Republican) 57.5%; Richard P. Noll (Democratic) 41.2%; Paul H. Leese (Const) 1.2%
Pennsylvania 20	Joseph M. Gaydos	Democratic	1968	Incumbent re-elected.	✓ Joseph M. Gaydos (Democratic) 61.5%; William Hunt (Republican) 38.5%
Pennsylvania 21	John H. Dent	Democratic	1958	Incumbent re-elected.	✓ John H. Dent (Democratic) 62.0%; Thomas H. Young (Republican) 38.0%
Pennsylvania 22	Thomas E. Morgan; Redistricted from the 26th district	Democratic	1944	Incumbent re-elected.	✓ Thomas E. Morgan (Democratic) 60.8%; James R. Montgomery (Republican) 39.2%
Pennsylvania 22	William Sheldrick Conover; Redistricted from the 27th district	Republican	1972 (Special)	Incumbent lost renomination. Republican loss.	✓ Thomas E. Morgan (Democratic) 60.8%; James R. Montgomery (Republican) 39.2%
Pennsylvania 23	Albert W. Johnson	Republican	1963 (Special)	Incumbent re-elected.	✓ Albert W. Johnson (Republican) 56.5%; Ernest A. Kassab (Democratic) 43.5%
Pennsylvania 24	Joseph P. Vigorito	Democratic	1964	Incumbent re-elected.	✓ Joseph P. Vigorito (Democratic) 68.8%; Alvin W. Levenhagen (Republican) 31.2%
Pennsylvania 25	Frank M. Clark	Democratic	1954	Incumbent re-elected.	✓ Frank M. Clark (Democratic) 55.8%; Gary A. Myers (Republican) 44.2%

== Rhode Island ==
District	Incumbent			This race	
District	Member	Party	First elected	Results	Candidates
Rhode Island 1	Fernand St. Germain	Democratic	1960	Incumbent re-elected.	✓ Fernand St. Germain (Democratic) 62.4%; John M. Feeley (Republican) 34.7%; Walter J. Miska (Independent) 3.0%
Rhode Island 2	Robert Tiernan	Democratic	1967 (Special)	Incumbent re-elected.	✓ Robert Tiernan (Democratic) 63.1%; Donald P. Ryan (Republican) 36.9%

== South Carolina ==
District	Incumbent			This race	
District	Member	Party	First elected	Results	Candidates
South Carolina 1	Mendel Jackson Davis	Democratic	1971 (Special)	Incumbent re-elected.	✓ Mendel Jackson Davis (Democratic) 54.5%; J. Sidi Limehouse III (Republican) 45.5%
South Carolina 2	Floyd Spence	Republican	1970	Incumbent re-elected.	✓ Floyd Spence (Republican); Unopposed
South Carolina 3	William Jennings Bryan Dorn	Democratic	1946; 1948 (retired); 1950	Incumbent re-elected.	✓ William Jennings Bryan Dorn (Democratic) 75.2%; Roy Etheridge (Republican) 24.8%
South Carolina 4	James R. Mann	Democratic	1968	Incumbent re-elected.	✓ James R. Mann (Democratic) 66.1%; Wayne N. Whatley (Republican) 33.9%
South Carolina 5	Thomas S. Gettys	Democratic	1964	Incumbent re-elected.	✓ Thomas S. Gettys (Democratic) 60.9%; Lenard Phillips (Republican) 39.1%
South Carolina 6	John L. McMillan	Democratic	1938	Incumbent lost renomination. Republican gain.	✓ Edward Lunn Young (Republican) 54.4%; John Jenrette (Democratic) 45.6%

== South Dakota ==
District	Incumbent			This race	
District	Member	Party	First elected	Results	Candidates
South Dakota 1	Frank E. Denholm	Democratic	1970	Incumbent re-elected.	✓ Frank E. Denholm (Democratic) 60.5%; John Vickerman (Republican) 39.5%
South Dakota 2	James Abourezk	Democratic	1970	Retired to run for U.S. senator. Republican gain.	✓ James Abdnor (Republican) 54.9%; Pat McKeever (Democratic) 45.1%

== Tennessee ==
District	Incumbent			This race	
District	Member	Party	First elected	Results	Candidates
Tennessee 1	Jimmy Quillen	Republican	1962	Incumbent re-elected.	✓ Jimmy Quillen (Republican) 79.4%; Bernard H. Cantor (Democratic) 20.6%
Tennessee 2	John Duncan Sr.	Republican	1964	Incumbent re-elected.	✓ John Duncan Sr. (Republican); Unopposed
Tennessee 3	LaMar Baker	Republican	1970	Incumbent re-elected.	✓ LaMar Baker (Republican) 55.2%; Howard P. Sompayrac Jr. (Democratic) 41.8%; Sarah Delaney (American) 2.9%
Tennessee 4	Joe L. Evins	Democratic	1946	Incumbent re-elected.	✓ Joe L. Evins (Democratic) 81.1%; Billy Joe Finney (Republican) 18.9%
Tennessee 5	Richard Fulton	Democratic	1962	Incumbent re-elected.	✓ Richard Fulton (Democratic) 62.6%; Alfred T. Adams Jr. (Republican) 36.8%; Scott Douglas III (Independent) 0.4%; Lee Galvani (Independent) 0.1%
Tennessee 6	William Anderson	Democratic	1964	Incumbent lost re-election. Republican gain.	✓ Robin Beard (Republican) 55.3%; William Anderson (Democratic) 43.1%; William N. Doss (American) 1.6%
Tennessee 6	Ray Blanton; Redistricted from the 7th district	Democratic	1966	Incumbent retired to run for U.S. senator. Democratic loss.	✓ Robin Beard (Republican) 55.3%; William Anderson (Democratic) 43.1%; William N. Doss (American) 1.6%
Tennessee 7	Ed Jones; Redistricted from the 8th district	Democratic	1969 (Special)	Incumbent re-elected.	✓ Ed Jones (Democratic) 70.5%; Stockton Adkins (Republican) 29.5%
Tennessee 8	Dan Kuykendall; Redistricted from the 9th district	Republican	1966	Incumbent re-elected.	✓ Dan Kuykendall (Republican) 55.4%; J. O. Patterson Jr. (Democratic) 44.1%; Louis L. Porter (Independent) 0.5%

== Texas ==
District	Incumbent			This race	
District	Member	Party	First elected	Results	Candidates
Texas 1	Wright Patman	Democratic	1928	Incumbent re-elected.	✓ Wright Patman (Democratic); Unopposed
Texas 2	John Dowdy	Democratic	1952	Incumbent retired. Democratic hold.	✓ Charles Wilson (Democratic) 73.8%; Charles O. Brightwell (Republican) 26.2%
Texas 3	James M. Collins	Republican	1968	Incumbent re-elected.	✓ James M. Collins (Republican) 73.3%; George A. Hughes Jr. (Democratic) 26.7%
Texas 4	Ray Roberts	Democratic	1962	Incumbent re-elected.	✓ Ray Roberts (Democratic) 70.2%; James Russell (Republican) 29.8%
Texas 5	Earle Cabell	Democratic	1964	Incumbent lost re-election. Republican gain.	✓ Alan Steelman (Republican) 55.7%; Earle Cabell (Democratic) 44.3%
Texas 6	Olin E. Teague	Democratic	1946	Incumbent re-elected.	✓ Olin E. Teague (Democratic) 72.6%; Carl Nigliazzo (Republican) 27.4%
Texas 7	William Reynolds Archer Jr.	Republican	1970	Incumbent re-elected.	✓ William Reynolds Archer Jr. (Republican) 82.3%; Jim Brady (Democratic) 17.7%
Texas 8	Robert C. Eckhardt	Democratic	1966	Incumbent re-elected.	✓ Robert C. Eckhardt (Democratic) 64.6%; Lewis Emerich (Republican) 34.7%; Susan Ellis (Socialist Workers) 0.7%
Texas 9	Jack Brooks	Democratic	1952	Incumbent re-elected.	✓ Jack Brooks (Democratic) 66.2%; Randolph C. Reed (Republican) 33.8%
Texas 10	J. J. Pickle	Democratic	1963 (Special)	Incumbent re-elected.	✓ J. J. Pickle (Democratic) 91.2%; Mellissa Singler (Socialist Workers) 8.8%
Texas 11	William R. Poage	Democratic	1936	Incumbent re-elected.	✓ William R. Poage (Democratic); Unopposed
Texas 12	Jim Wright	Democratic	1954	Incumbent re-elected.	✓ Jim Wright (Democratic); Unopposed
Texas 13	Graham B. Purcell Jr.	Democratic	1962	Incumbent lost re-election. Democratic loss.	✓ Robert Price (Republican) 54.8%; Graham B. Purcell Jr. (Democratic) 45.2%
Texas 13	Robert Price; Redistricted from the 18th district	Republican	1966	Incumbent re-elected.	✓ Robert Price (Republican) 54.8%; Graham B. Purcell Jr. (Democratic) 45.2%
Texas 14	John Andrew Young	Democratic	1956	Incumbent re-elected.	✓ John Andrew Young (Democratic); Unopposed
Texas 15	Kika de la Garza	Democratic	1964	Incumbent re-elected.	✓ Kika de la Garza (Democratic); Unopposed
Texas 16	Richard Crawford White	Democratic	1964	Incumbent re-elected.	✓ Richard Crawford White (Democratic); Unopposed
Texas 17	Omar Burleson	Democratic	1946	Incumbent re-elected.	✓ Omar Burleson (Democratic); Unopposed
Texas 18	None (district created)			New seat. Democratic gain.	✓ Barbara Jordan (Democratic) 80.6%; Paul Merritt (Republican) 18.2%; Emmanuel Barrera (Socialist Workers) 1.2%
Texas 19	George H. Mahon	Democratic	1934	Incumbent re-elected.	✓ George H. Mahon (Democratic); Unopposed
Texas 20	Henry B. González	Democratic	1961 (Special)	Incumbent re-elected.	✓ Henry B. González (Democratic) 96.9%; Steve Wattenmaker (Socialist Workers) 3.1%
Texas 21	O. C. Fisher	Democratic	1942	Incumbent re-elected.	✓ O. C. Fisher (Democratic) 56.8%; Doug Harlan (Republican) 43.2%
Texas 22	Robert R. Casey	Democratic	1958	Incumbent re-elected.	✓ Robert R. Casey (Democratic) 70.2%; Jim Griffin (Republican) 29.0%; Frank Peto (Independent) 0.8%
Texas 23	Abraham Kazen	Democratic	1966	Incumbent re-elected.	✓ Abraham Kazen (Democratic); Unopposed
Texas 24	None (district created)			New seat. Democratic gain.	✓ Dale Milford (Democratic) 65.1%; Courtney G. Roberts (Republican) 34.9%

== Utah ==
District	Incumbent			This race	
District	Member	Party	First elected	Results	Candidates
Utah 1	K. Gunn McKay	Democratic	1970	Incumbent re-elected.	✓ K. Gunn McKay (Democratic) 55.4%; Robert K. Wolthuis (Republican) 42.0%; L. S. Brown (American) 2.6%
Utah 2	Sherman P. Lloyd	Republican	1962; 1964 (retired); 1966	Incumbent lost re-election. Democratic gain.	✓ Douglas W. Owens (Democratic) 48.9%; Sherman P. Lloyd (Republican) 39.4%; Bruce R. Bangerter (American Independent) 11.7%

== Vermont ==
District	Incumbent			This race	
District	Member	Party	First elected	Results	Candidates
Vermont at-large	Richard W. Mallary	Republican	1972 (Special)	Incumbent re-elected.	✓ Richard W. Mallary (Republican) 65.0%; William H. Meyer (Democratic) 35.0%

== Virginia ==
District	Incumbent			This race	
District	Member	Party	First elected	Results	Candidates
Virginia 1	Thomas N. Downing	Democratic	1958	Incumbent re-elected.	✓ Thomas N. Downing (Democratic) 78.1%; Kenneth D. Wells (Republican) 21.9%
Virginia 2	G. William Whitehurst	Republican	1968	Incumbent re-elected.	✓ G. William Whitehurst (Republican) 73.4%; L. Charles Burlage (Democratic) 26.6%
Virginia 3	David E. Satterfield III	Democratic	1964	Incumbent re-elected.	✓ David E. Satterfield III (Democratic); Unopposed
Virginia 4	Watkins Moorman Abbitt	Democratic	1948	Incumbent retired. Republican gain.	✓ Robert Daniel (Republican) 47.1%; Robert E. Gibson (Democratic) 37.5%; Robert R. Hardy (Independent) 7.1%; Others 5.1%; John G. Vonetes (Independent) 3.3%
Virginia 5	Dan Daniel	Democratic	1968	Incumbent re-elected.	✓ Dan Daniel (Democratic); Unopposed
Virginia 6	Richard Harding Poff	Republican	1952	Resigned to become justice of Supreme Court of Virginia. Republican hold.	✓ M. Caldwell Butler (Republican) 54.6%; Willis M. Anderson (Democratic) 39.2%; Roy R. White (Independent) 6.2%
Virginia 7	J. Kenneth Robinson	Republican	1970	Incumbent re-elected.	✓ J. Kenneth Robinson (Republican) 66.2%; Murat Williams (Democratic) 33.8%
Virginia 8	William L. Scott	Republican	1966	Retired to run for U.S. senator. Republican hold.	✓ Stanford Parris (Republican) 44.4%; Robert F. Horan (Democratic) 37.8%; William R. Durland (Independent) 13.7%; Robert E. Harris (Independent) 4.1%
Virginia 9	William C. Wampler	Republican	1952; 1954 (defeated); 1966	Incumbent re-elected.	✓ William C. Wampler (Republican) 71.9%; Zane Dale Christian (Democratic) 26.4%; Nicholas Ventura (Independent) 1.7%
Virginia 10	Joel T. Broyhill	Republican	1952	Incumbent re-elected.	✓ Joel T. Broyhill (Republican) 56.3%; Harold O. Miller (Democratic) 43.7%

== Washington ==
District	Incumbent			This race	
District	Member	Party	First elected	Results	Candidates
Washington 1	Thomas Pelly	Republican	1952	Incumbent retired. Republican hold.	✓ Joel Pritchard (Republican) 50.3%; John Hempelmann (Democratic) 49.1%; Craig Honts (Socialist Workers) 0.7%
Washington 2	Lloyd Meeds	Democratic	1964	Incumbent re-elected.	✓ Lloyd Meeds (Democratic) 60.4%; Bill Reams (Republican) 39.6%
Washington 3	Julia Butler Hansen	Democratic	1960	Incumbent re-elected.	✓ Julia Butler Hansen (Democratic) 66.3%; R. C. McConkey (Republican) 33.7%
Washington 4	Mike McCormack	Democratic	1970	Incumbent re-elected.	✓ Mike McCormack (Democratic) 52.1%; Steward Bledsoe (Republican) 47.9%
Washington 5	Tom Foley	Democratic	1964	Incumbent re-elected.	✓ Tom Foley (Democratic) 81.3%; Clarice L. R. Privette (Republican) 18.7%
Washington 6	Floyd Verne Hicks	Democratic	1964	Incumbent re-elected.	✓ Floyd Verne Hicks (Democratic) 72.1%; Thomas C. Lowry (Republican) 27.9%
Washington 7	Brock Adams	Democratic	1964	Incumbent re-elected.	✓ Brock Adams (Democratic) 87.6%; J. J. 'Tiny' Freeman (Republican) 12.4%

== West Virginia ==
District	Incumbent			This race	
District	Member	Party	First elected	Results	Candidates
West Virginia 1	Bob Mollohan	Democratic	1952; 1956 (retired); 1968	Incumbent re-elected.	✓ Bob Mollohan (Democratic) 69.4%; George E. Kapnicky (Republican) 30.6%
West Virginia 2	Harley O. Staggers	Democratic	1948	Incumbent re-elected.	✓ Harley O. Staggers (Democratic) 70.3%; David Dix (Republican) 29.7%
West Virginia 3	John M. Slack Jr.	Democratic	1958	Incumbent re-elected.	✓ John M. Slack Jr. (Democratic) 63.7%; T. David Higgins (Republican) 36.3%
West Virginia 4	Ken Hechler	Democratic	1958	Incumbent re-elected.	✓ Ken Hechler (Democratic) 61.0%; Joe Neal (Republican) 39.0%
West Virginia 4	James Kee; Redistricted from the 5th district	Democratic	1964	Incumbent lost renomination. Democratic loss.	✓ Ken Hechler (Democratic) 61.0%; Joe Neal (Republican) 39.0%

== Wisconsin ==
District	Incumbent			This race	
District	Member	Party	First elected	Results	Candidates
Wisconsin 1	Les Aspin	Democratic	1970	Incumbent re-elected.	✓ Les Aspin (Democratic) 64.4%; Merrill E. Stalbaum (Republican) 34.9%; Charles J. Fortner (American) 0.7%
Wisconsin 2	Robert W. Kastenmeier	Democratic	1958	Incumbent re-elected.	✓ Robert W. Kastenmeier (Democratic) 68.2%; J. Michael Kelly (Republican) 31.4%; Lavern F. Krohn (American) 0.5%
Wisconsin 3	Vernon Wallace Thomson	Republican	1960	Incumbent re-elected.	✓ Vernon Wallace Thomson (Republican) 54.7%; Walter Thoresen (Democratic) 44.6%; Keith Ellison (American) 0.7%
Wisconsin 4	Clement J. Zablocki	Democratic	1948	Incumbent re-elected.	✓ Clement J. Zablocki (Democratic) 75.7%; Phillip D. Mrozinski (Republican) 22.8%; Eugene Annell (American) 1.5%
Wisconsin 5	Henry S. Reuss	Democratic	1954	Incumbent re-elected.	✓ Henry S. Reuss (Democratic) 77.3%; Frederick Van Hecke (Republican) 20.4%; George Sprague (American) 1.7%; R. Julian Chapman (Independent) 0.6%
Wisconsin 6	William A. Steiger	Republican	1966	Incumbent re-elected.	✓ William A. Steiger (Republican) 65.8%; James A. Adams (Democratic) 32.0%; Valeria M. Sitter (American Independent) 2.1%
Wisconsin 7	Dave Obey	Democratic	1969 (Special)	Incumbent re-elected.	✓ Dave Obey (Democratic) 62.8%; Alvin E. O'Konski (Republican) 37.2%
Wisconsin 7	Alvin E. O'Konski; Redistricted from the 10th district	Republican	1942	Incumbent lost re-election. Republican loss.	✓ Dave Obey (Democratic) 62.8%; Alvin E. O'Konski (Republican) 37.2%
Wisconsin 8	John W. Byrnes	Republican	1944	Incumbent retired. Republican hold.	✓ Harold Vernon Froehlich (Republican) 50.4%; Robert J. Cornell (Democratic) 48.5%; Clyde Bunker (American) 1.1%
Wisconsin 9	Glenn R. Davis	Republican	1947 (special); 1956 (retired); 1964	Incumbent re-elected.	✓ Glenn R. Davis (Republican) 61.4%; Ralph A. Fine (Democratic) 36.7%; George Reed (American) 1.9%

== Wyoming ==
District	Incumbent			This race	
District	Member	Party	First elected	Results	Candidates
Wyoming at-large	Teno Roncalio	Democratic	1964; 1966 (retired); 1970	Incumbent re-elected.	✓ Teno Roncalio (Democratic) 51.7%; William Kidd (Republican) 48.3%

== Non-voting delegates ==
The non-voting delegate to the House of Representatives from the District of Columbia is elected for two-year terms, as are all other Representatives and Delegates minus the Resident Commissioner of Puerto Rico, who is elected to a four-year term.

=== District of Columbia ===
District of Columbia election
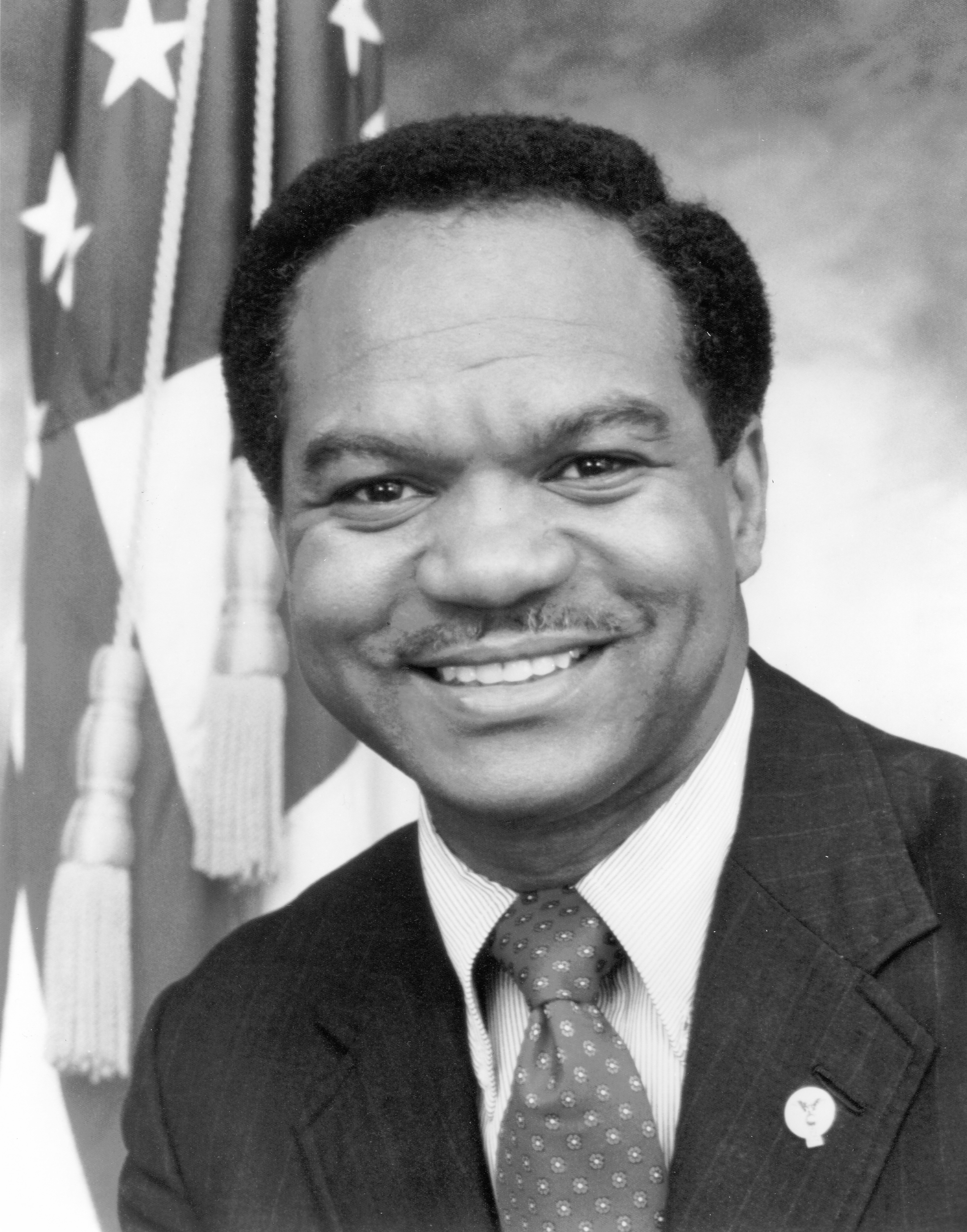
Candidate	Walter E. Fauntroy	William Chin-Lee	Charles I. Cassell
Party	Democratic	Republican	DC Statehood Green
Popular vote	95,300	39,487	18,730
Percentage	60.64%	25.12%	11.92%
Delegate before election
Walter E. Fauntroy
Democratic
Elected Delegate
Walter E. Fauntroy
Democratic

The election for the delegate from the District of Columbia featured winner Walter E. Fauntroy (D), who won his first re-election after winning the special election in the previous year.

Walter E. Fauntroy, a Democrat, sought re-election for his second term to the United States House of Representatives. Fauntroy was opposed in this election by Republican challenger William Chin-Lee, who received 25.12%, and Statehood Party candidate Charles I. Cassell, who received 11.92%. This resulted in Fauntroy being elected with 60.64% of the vote.

D.C. at-large congressional district election (1972)
Party	Candidate	Votes	%
Democratic	Walter E. Fauntroy (incumbent)	95,300	60.64
Republican	William Chin-Lee	39,487	25.12
DC Statehood Green	Charles I. Cassell	18,730	11.92
Independent	David H. Dabney	2,514	1.60
Socialist Workers	Herman Fagg	1,133	0.72
Total votes		157,164	100.00
Democratic hold			

=== United States Virgin Islands ===
Democrat Ron de Lugo was elected as the first delegate from United States Virgin Islands's at-large congressional district defeating Republican Victor Scheider.

US House election, 1972: U.S. Virgin Islands at-large district
Party	Candidate	Votes	%	±%
Democratic	Ron de Lugo	10,570	72.6%	
Republican	Victor Schneider	3,987	27.4%	
Majority		6,583	45.2%	
Turnout		14,557	100.0%	

== See also ==
- 1972 United States elections
  - 1972 United States gubernatorial elections
  - 1972 United States Senate elections
- 92nd United States Congress
- 93rd United States Congress

== Works cited ==
- Abramson, Paul; Aldrich, John; Rohde, David (1995). Change and Continuity in the 1992 Elections. CQ Press. ISBN 0871878399.
