= Senator Stone =

Senator Stone may refer to:

== Members of the United States Senate ==
- David Stone (politician) (1770–1818), U.S. Senator from North Carolina from 1801 to 1807 and 1813 to 1814
- Richard Stone (politician) (1928–2019), U.S. Senator from Florida from 1975 to 1980

== United States state senate members ==
- Ben Stone (politician) (born 1935), Mississippi State Senate
- Bill Stone (politician) (born 1965), Mississippi State Senate
- Charles W. Stone (1843–1912), Pennsylvania State Senate
- Claude Stone Jr. (1926–2014), Illinois State Senate
- Eben F. Stone (1822–1895), Massachusetts State Senate
- Jeff Stone (California and Nevada politician) (born 1956), California State Senate
- Jesse Stone (Georgia politician) (born 1956), Georgia State Senate
- John Marshall Stone (1830–1900), Mississippi State Senate
- John Young Stone (1843–1928), Iowa State Senate
- Matt Stone (politician) (fl. 2020s), Arkansas State Senate
- Norman R. Stone Jr. (1935–2023), Maryland State Senate
- T. Clarence Stone (1899–1969), North Carolina State Senate
- Thomas Stone (1743–1787), Maryland State Senate
- W. W. Stone (1840–1930), Mississippi State Senate

== See also ==
- John Thompson Stoneman (1831–1905), Iowa State Senate
