= Benjamin Stone =

Benjamin Stone may refer to:

== People ==
- Sir John Benjamin Stone (1838–1914), known as Benjamin Stone, English politician and photographer
- Benjamin Stone (actor) (born 1987), British actor
- Benjamin Clemens Stone (1933–1994), British–American botanist
- Ben Stone (politician) (born 1935), American politician

== In fiction ==
- Benjamin Stone (Law & Order), a character in the television series Law & Order, played by Michael Moriarty
- Dr. Benjamin Stone, a character in the film Doc Hollywood, played by Michael J. Fox
- Benjamin Stone, a character in the film Knocked Up, played by Seth Rogen
- Benjamin Stone, a character in the television series Manifest, played by Josh Dallas
