= Carter F. Bales =

American investor (1938–2019)

Carter Franklin Bales (1938–2019) was an American investor, asset manager, environmentalist, conservationist, philanthropist, and informal public servant. Bales co-founded NewWorld Capital Group, LLC, an environmental sector private investment firm, based in New York City. Mr. Bales served as the Chairman and Managing Partner.

== Early life and education ==
Bales graduated from Princeton University with a BA in Economics in 1960 and earned an MBA from Harvard Business School in 1965. He worked as a systems engineer at IBM in the early 1960s and served as Systems Design Chief for the First U.S. Army at Governors Island.

== Consulting career ==
Bales joined McKinsey & Company as a management consultant in 1965 and was elected a principal in 1969. From 1978 to 1998, he was a Director of McKinsey & Company. He founded McKinsey's practices in environmental management, information industries, state and local government, and media and communications, and also led the Firm's information technology practice. He served in McKinsey's Board of Directors for seven years and, early in that period, led a project to redefine the Firm's strategy.

Bales retired from McKinsey in 1998 but continued as an Emeritus Director and Senior Advisor to McKinsey on environmental and sustainability matters for many years.

Bales played the lead role in developing an approach to "issue mapping" in order to advise New York Mayor Lindsay's Policy Planning Council on cost-effective strategies for addressing complex urban problems. Its first application was an analysis of Local Law 14 which addressed the choice of allowing apartment houses to incinerate their refuse vs. the option of compacting refuse or hauling raw refuse by the City's Sanitation Department. Bales then played a lead role in forming and staffing an expanded program planning staff and a separate project management staff in City government to help ensure successful analysis and implementation of Mayoral policy decisions.

Bales, along with P.C. Chatterjee, Donald Gogel, and Anupam Puri, developed the concept of a “business system” and competitive cost analysis, which was introduced in a McKinsey Staff Paper and subsequently in several articles in The McKinsey Quarterly. A business system consists of the various elements of the system of activities that a company employs to make and deliver products or services to a target market. At each stage of the system, the company has a range of choices for performing the activities and balancing the overall system to deliver the product or service most cost-effectively. Competitive cost analysis allows a company to benchmark its activities against selected competitors in a target market.

== Business career ==
Carter Bales co-founded The Wicks Group of Companies, L.L.C. in 1989, a private equity firm focused of the U.S. information, education and media industries. He served as a Managing Partner of the Firm until assuming the Emeritus title in late 2006.

Bales then co-founded NewWorld Capital Group, L.L.C. in June 2009, a private investment firm focused on the environmental opportunities sector in the middle market in the United States and Canada, with special focus on energy efficiency, clean energy, water resources and reclamation, waste-to-value, and environmental products and services.

== Public service career ==
Early in his career, Bales served as Assistant Budget Director (Acting) for The City of New York, where he led the development of New York City's air pollution, solid waste management, and water supply programs, as well as developing the City's program planning and budgeting (PPBS) system, following on a period consulting to the Office of the Secretary of Defense on the nation's Five-Year Force Strategy and Financial Plan. Bales also played a leadership role in New York City's housing policy and its school decentralization program at that time.

A Democrat, Bales was the candidate to the U.S. House of Representatives from New York's 3rd congressional district in 1972, but lost the race to Angelo Roncallo in the Nixon Landslide.

== Philanthropy and environmentalism ==
Bales was active in environmental matters for more than four decades. In 2007, he worked with McKinsey to prepare the landmark report entitled. In 2008 and 2009, he worked with Project Catalyst and other initiatives in support of the UNFCCC process in framing the economics of environmental improvement strategies in the United States and elsewhere.

Bales serves on the boards of a number of environmental organizations, including The North Shore Land Alliance (where he is the Founding Chair), The Grand Canyon Trust (where he was formerly Vice Chair), the Adirondack Nature Conservancy, The Center for Market Innovation at the Natural Resources Defense Council, and the Advisory Council to Resources for the Future.

Previously, Bales was Vice Chairman and Chairman of the International Committee of the Board of Governors of The Nature Conservancy and Chairman of the Board of Trustees of The Nature Conservancy of New York.

In past years, Bales was Vice Chairman of the New York State Foundation for Science, Technology and Innovation (before it merged into the NYS Department of Economic Development), a Trustee and Special Advisor to the Echoing Green Foundation, Chairman of the Leadership Council of The Clean Economy Network, President of Cancer Research Institute, a trustee of Union Theological Seminary, and a trustee of the Episcopal School in the City of New York.

Bales received an Honorary Doctorate in Humane Letters from Skidmore College in 2009 for his environmental leadership.

Bales is a member of the Council on Foreign Relations.

Bales has published a number of articles and is a frequent speaker on environmental matters. His article, “Containing Climate Change” (co-authored with Rick Duke), appeared in Foreign Affairs (September–October 2008).

== Personal life ==
Carter F. Bales was married to Suzanne F. Bales (deceased). She was an author and lecturer on gardening. The couple have four children. They lived in Centre Island, New York.
