= 1970 United States House of Representatives elections in Nebraska =

- November 3, 1970

All 3 Nebraska seats to the United States House of Representatives
	Majority party	Minority party
Party	Republican	Democratic
Last election	3	0
Seats won	3	0
Seat change	Steady	Steady
Popular vote	242,507	164,558
Percentage	0.00%

The United States House of Representatives elections in Nebraska, 1970 was an election for Nebraska's delegation to the United States House of Representatives, which occurred as part of the general election of the House of Representatives on November 3, 1970.

== Overview ==
United States House of Representatives elections in Nebraska, 1970
Party	Votes	%	Before	After	+/–
Republican	242,507	0.00%	3	3	0
Democratic	164,558	0.00%	0	0	0
Independent	40,919	0.00%	0	0	-
Scattering	115	0.00%	0	0	-
Totals	448,499	100.00%	3	3	—

== Results ==
Final results from the Clerk of the House of Representatives:

=== District 1 ===
Nebraska's 1st congressional district election, 1970
Party	Candidate	Votes	%
Republican	Charles Thone	79,131	50.63
Independent	Clair Armstrong Callan	40,919	26.18
Democratic	George Bill Burrows	36,240	23.19
	Scattering	15	0.00
Total votes		156,305	100.00
Turnout			
Republican hold			

==== By county ====
County	Charles Thone Republican		Clair Armstrong Callan Independent		George Bill Burrows Democratic		Various candidates Other parties		Margin		Total
County	#	%	#	%	#	%	#	%	#	%	Total
Johnson	771	34.87%	363	16.42%	1,077	48.71%	0	0.00%	306	13.84%	2,211
Lancaster	22,918	48.01%	14,305	29.97%	10,515	22.03%	14	0.14%	8,613	18.04%	47,752
Saline	1,551	34.28%	1,743	38.53%	1,230	27.19%	0	0.00%	192	4.25%	4,524

=== District 2 ===
Nebraska's 2nd congressional district election, 1970
Party	Candidate	Votes	%
Republican	John Y. McCollister	69,671	51.88
Democratic	John Hlavacek	64,620	48.12
	Scattering	96	0.00
Total votes		134,387	100.00
Turnout			
Republican hold			

==== By county ====
County	John Y. McCollister Republican		John Hlavacek Democratic		Various candidates Other parties		Margin		Total
County	#	%	#	%	#	%	#	%	Total
Burt	1,826		1,227		0		599		3,053
Cass	2,342		2,877		0		535		5,219
Douglas	58,115		52,778		91		5,337		110,984
Sarpy	5,074		5,619		5		445		10,698
Washington	2,314		2,119		0		195		4,433
Totals	69,671	51.88%	64,620	48.12%	96	0.00%	5,051	3.76%	134,387

=== District 3 ===
Nebraska's 3rd congressional district election, 1970
Party	Candidate	Votes	%
Republican	David Martin	93,705	59.53
Democratic	Donald Searcy	63,698	40.47
N/A	Scattering	4	0.00
Total votes		157,407	100.00
Turnout			
Republican hold			

==== By county ====
County	David Martin Republican		Donald Searcy Democratic		Various candidates Other parties		Margin		Total
County	#	%	#	%	#	%	#	%	Total

== See also ==
- 92nd United States Congress
- Political party strength in Nebraska
- Political party strength in U.S. states
- 1970 United States House of Representatives elections
