= Roy C. Strickland =

- Born: September 20, 1942; Vicksburg; Warren County; Mississippi, U.S.
- Died: September 22, 2010 (aged 68); The Woodlands, Texas, U.S.
- Resting place: Forest Park Cemetery in The Woodlands, Texas
- Occupations: Businessman; real estate agent
- Political party: Republican candidate for the United States House of Representatives, 8th District, Louisiana, 1972

Notes
- Strickland sought office in two states, as a Republican in Louisiana in 1972, challenging Gillis William Long for the United States House of Representatives, and as an Independent in Montgomery County, Texas, for a county commission seat.

Roy Clifton Strickland (September 20, 1942 – September 22, 2010) was an American businessman in The Woodlands, Texas. He was a pioneer in the development of the Republican Party in the state of Louisiana. He challenged the Democratic candidate Gillis William Long, a member of the Long family, for the United States House of Representatives in 1972.

Strickland died on September 22, 2010, in The Woodlands, Texas, at the age of 68.
