= 1971 United States House of Representatives elections =

There were four Special elections in 1971 to the United States House of Representatives:

District	Incumbent			This race	
District	Member	Party	First elected	Results	Candidates
District of Columbia at-large	None (new seat)			New seat. Delegate's seat was re-established during previous congress. Democratic gain.	▌ ✓ Walter Fauntroy (Democratic) 58.44%; ▌John A. Nevius (Republican) 25.08%; ▌Julius Hobson (DC Statehood) 13.23%; Others: ▌Frank Kameny (Independent) 1.62%; ▌Douglas Moore (Independent) 1.12%; ▌James Harris (Socialist Workers) 0.37%
South Carolina 1	Vacant			Incumbent L. Mendel Rivers (D) died during previous congress. New member elected April 27, 1971. Democratic hold.	▌ ✓ Mendel J. Davis (Democratic) 48.27%; ▌James B. Edwards (Republican) 41.40%; ▌Victoria DeLee (United Citizens) 10.25%; ▌Elsie V. Carroll (Independent) 0.08%
Maryland 1	Rogers Morton	Republican	1962	Incumbent resigned January 29, 1971, after being appointed U.S. Secretary of the Interior. New member elected May 25, 1971. Republican hold.	▌ ✓ William O. Mills (Republican) 54.17%; ▌Elroy G. Boyer (Democratic) 45.83%
Pennsylvania 18	Robert J. Corbett	Republican	1938; 1940 (lost); 1944	Incumbent died April 25, 1971. New member elected November 2, 1971. Republican hold.	▌ ✓ John Heinz (Republican) 66.64%; ▌John E. Connelly (Democratic) 31.62%; ▌John E. Backman (Constitution) 1.74%
Kentucky 6	John C. Watts	Democratic		Incumbent died September 24, 1971. New member elected December 4, 1971. Democratic hold.	▌ ✓ William P. Curlin Jr. (Democratic) 52.57%; ▌Raymond Nutter (Republican) 38.10%; ▌Edgar A. Wallace (Independent) 7.19%; ▌Wasley S. Krogdahl (American) 2.15%
