= Ben Stone (politician) =

American politician in the state of Mississippi

Member of the Mississippi State Senate
- In office 1968–1979

Personal details
- Born: January 18, 1935 (age 91) Gulfport, Mississippi
- Party: Democratic
- Occupation: Attorney

Ben Harry Stone (born January 18, 1935) is an American politician in the state of Mississippi. He served in the Mississippi State Senate from 1968 to 1979.
