= 1962 United States House of Representatives elections =

House elections for the 88th U.S. Congress

- November 6, 1962

All 435 seats in the United States House of Representatives 218 seats needed for a majority
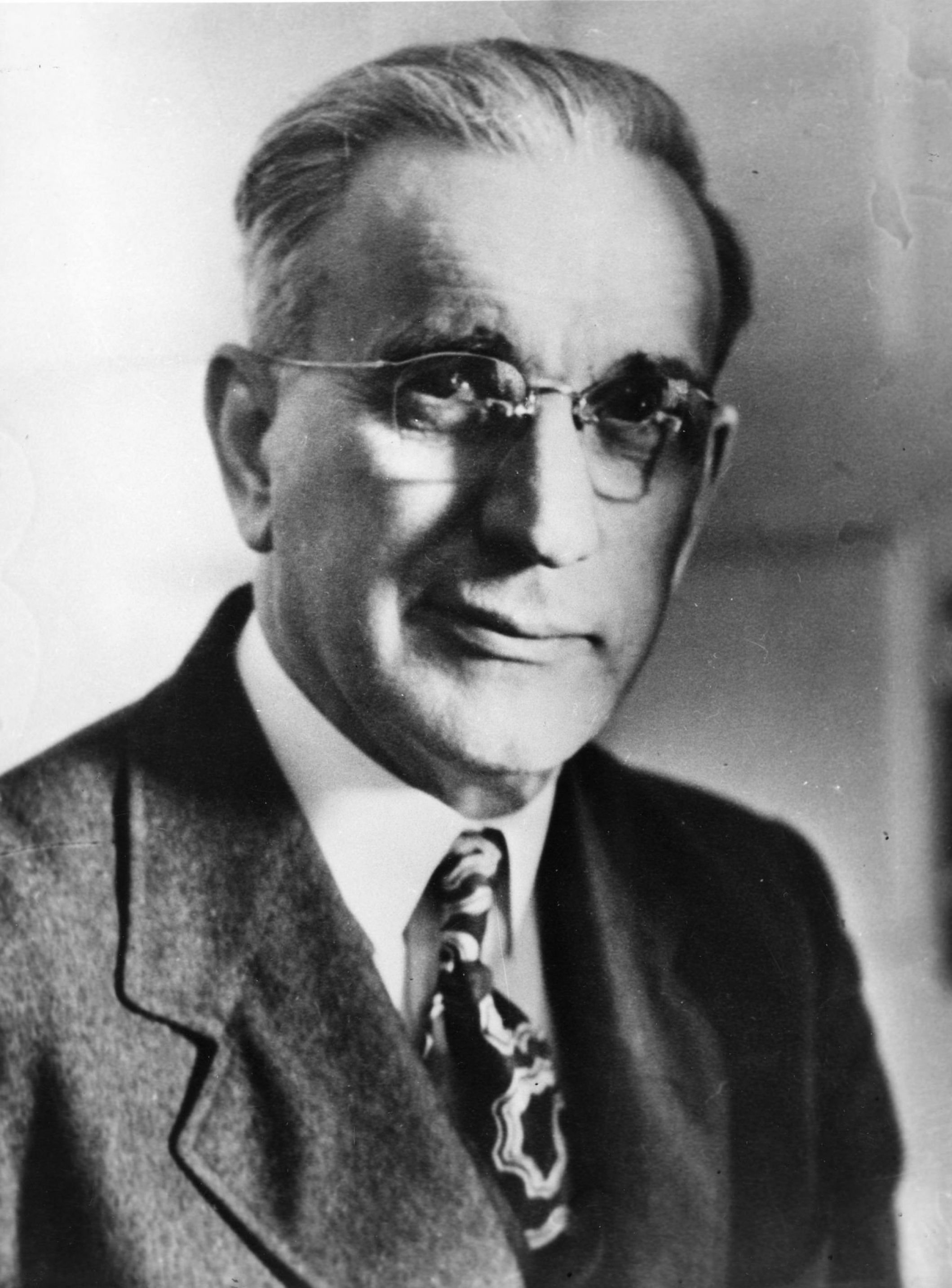

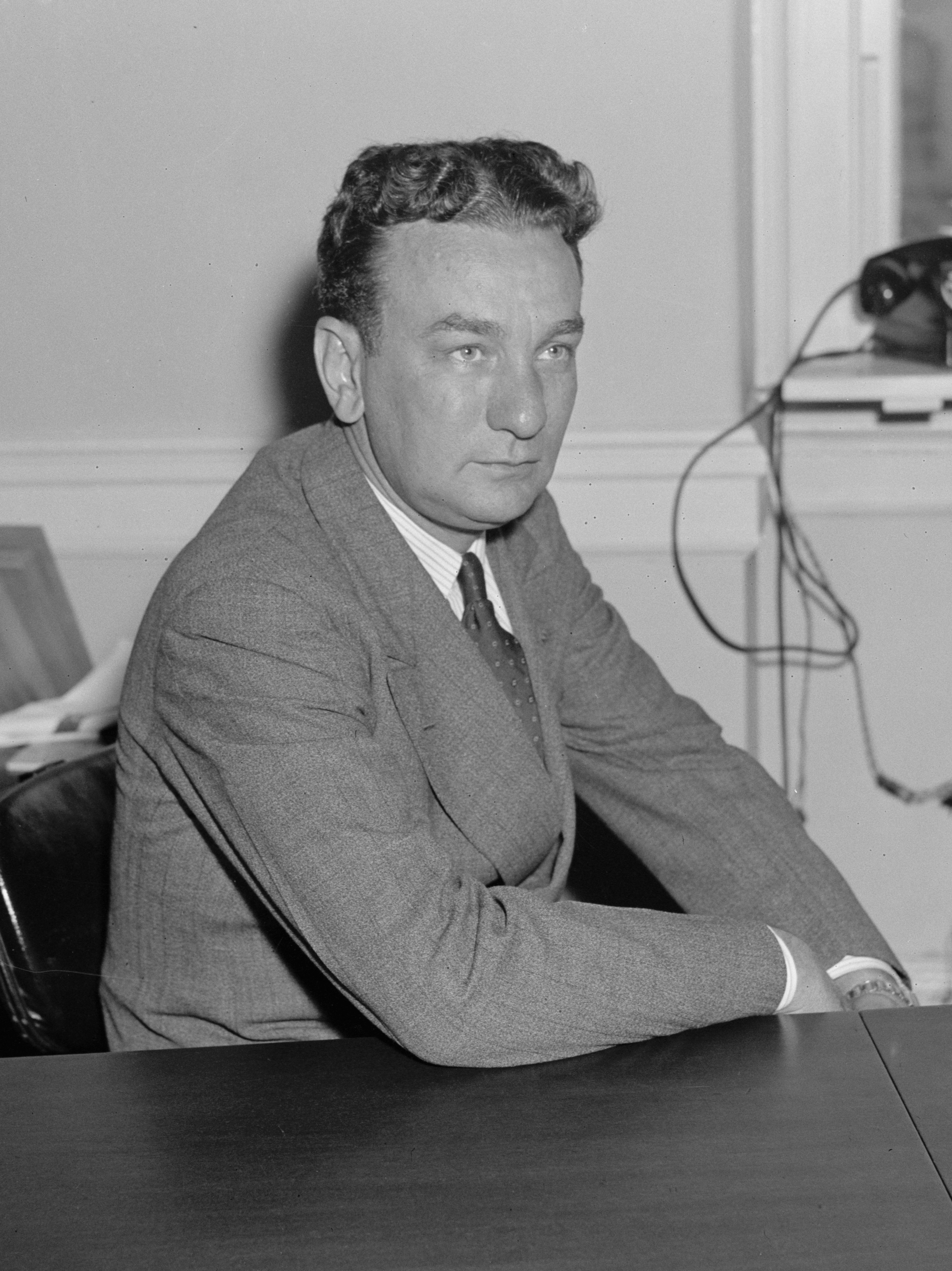
	Majority party	Minority party
Leader	John McCormack	Charles A. Halleck
Party	Democratic	Republican
Leader since	January 10, 1962	January 3, 1959
Leader's seat	Massachusetts 9th	Indiana 2nd
Last election	262 seats	175 seats
Seats won	259	176
Seat change	▼3	▲1
Popular vote	26,860,184	24,160,387
Percentage	52.4%	47.1%
Swing	▼2.4pp	▲2.3pp
Speaker before election
John McCormack
Democratic
Elected Speaker
John McCormack
Democratic

The 1962 United States House of Representatives elections was an election for the United States House of Representatives on November 6, 1962, to elect members to serve in the 88th United States Congress. They occurred in the middle of President John F. Kennedy's term. As in most midterm elections, Kennedy's Democratic Party lost seats to the opposition Republican Party, but retained a majority. House Democrats were expected to lose their majority, but the resolution over the Cuban Missile Crisis just a few weeks prior led to a rebound in approval for the Democrats under President Kennedy.

The number of seats up for election went back to 435, in accordance with reapportionment and redistricting resulting from the 1960 census. The membership had been increased temporarily to 437 in 1959, providing 1 seat each for the new states of Alaska and Hawaii, while the other 435 seats continued with the reapportionment resulting from the 1950 census.

This was the last midterm election cycle until 2022 in which a Democratic president experienced net losses for his party in the House while experiencing net gains in the Senate.

This is the earliest House election with elected members who are still alive: Alec G. Olson, D-MN, and Don Fuqua, D-FL.

== Overall results ==
402 incumbent members sought reelection, but 12 were defeated in primaries and 22 defeated in the general election for a total of 368 incumbents winning.

↓
259	176
Democratic	Republican

Parties	Seats				Popular Vote		
Parties	1960	1962	Change	Strength	Vote	%	Change
Democratic Party	262	259	▼3	59.3%	26,860,184	52.4%	▼2.4%
Republican Party	175	176	▲1	40.5%	24,160,387	47.1%	▲2.3%
Liberal Party	0	0	Steady	0.0%	94,208	0.2%	Steady
Independent	0	0	Steady	0.0%	80,484	0.2%	▲0.2%
Prohibition Party	0	0	Steady	0.0%	17,171	<0.1%	Steady
Conservative Party	0	0	Steady	0.0%	6,950	<0.1%	Steady
Socialist Labor Party	0	0	Steady	0.0%	2,611	<0.1%	Steady
Voters For Peace Party	0	0	Steady	0.0%	1,124	<0.1%	Steady
Socialist Workers Party	0	0	Steady	0.0%	730	<0.1%	Steady
Others	0	0	Steady	0.0%	19,139	<0.1%	▼0.1%
Total	437	435	▼2	100.0%	51,242,988	100.0%	——
Source: Election Statistics – Office of the Clerk

Popular vote
Democratic	52.42%
Republican	47.15%
Others	0.43%

House seats
Democratic	59.54%
Republican	40.46%

Results shaded according to winners share of the popular vote

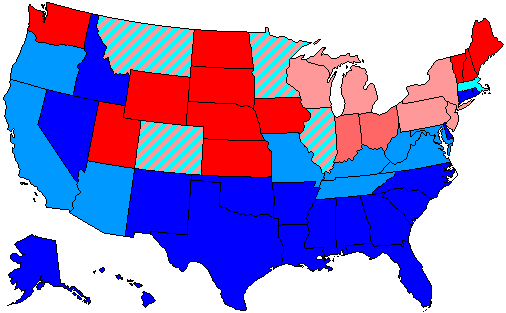
House seats by party holding plurality in state: 80+% Democratic / 80+% Republican; 60+% to 80% Democratic / 60+% to 80% Republican; up to 60% Democratic / up to 60% Republican; Stripes = 50/50 split

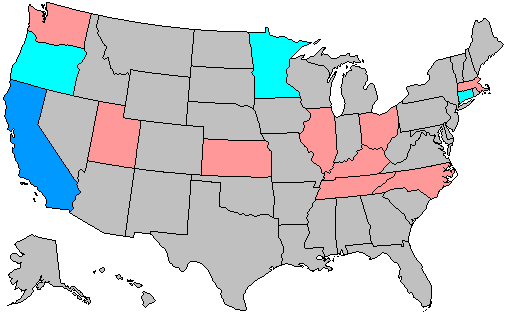
Change by party: 6+ Democratic gain / 6+ Republican gain; 3–5 Democratic gain / 3–5 Republican gain; 1–2 Democratic gain / 1–2 Republican gain; no net change

== Special elections ==
Elections are listed by date and district.

District	Incumbent			This race	
District	Representative	Party	First elected	Results	Candidates
Texas 13	Frank N. Ikard	Democratic	1951 (special)	Incumbent resigned December 15, 1961. New member elected January 27, 1962. Democratic hold; winner was subsequently re-elected.	▌ ✓ Graham B. Purcell Jr. (Democratic) 62.9%; ▌Joe Meissner (Republican) 37.1%
Texas 4	Sam Rayburn	Democratic	1912	Incumbent died November 16, 1961. New member elected January 30, 1962. Democratic hold; winner was subsequently re-elected.	▌ ✓ Ray Roberts (Democratic) 54.3%; ▌R. C. Slagle (Democratic) 46.7%
Michigan 14	Louis C. Rabaut	Democratic	1934	Incumbent died November 12, 1961. New member elected February 13, 1962. Democratic hold; winner was subsequently re-elected.	▌ ✓ Harold M. Ryan (Democratic) 50.5%; ▌Robert E. Waldron (Republican) 49.2%; ▌Charles Frazier (Socialist Labor) 0.28%
New York 6	Lester Holtzman	Democratic	1952	Incumbent resigned December 31, 1961. New member elected February 20, 1962. Democratic hold; winner was subsequently re-elected to the redistricted 8th district.	▌ ✓ Benjamin Rosenthal (Democratic) 44.5%; ▌Thomas F. Galvin (Republican) 43.8%; ▌Emil Levin (Emil Levin) 11.7%
South Carolina 2	John J. Riley	Democratic	1944	Incumbent died January 1, 1962. New member elected to finish her husband's term April 10, 1962. Democratic hold. Winner was not a candidate for re-election in November.	▌ ✓ Corinne Boyd Riley (Democratic) 100%

== Alabama ==
Alabama lost 1 seat in redistricting and elected all seats at-large as a method of determining which seat to eliminate.

District	Incumbent			Results	Candidates
District	Member	Party	First elected	Results	Candidates
Alabama at-large	George M. Grant; Redistricted from the 2nd district	Democratic	1938	Incumbent re-elected.	▌ ✓ George Huddleston Jr. (Democratic) 11.3%; ▌ ✓ Armistead I. Selden Jr. (Democratic) 11.0%; ▌ ✓ George W. Andrews (Democratic) 10.9%; ▌ ✓ George M. Grant (Democratic) 10.7%; ▌ ✓ Albert Rains (Democratic) 10.1%; ▌ ✓ Kenneth A. Roberts (Democratic) 10.0%; ▌ ✓ Robert E. Jones Jr. (Democratic) 9.6%; ▌ ✓ Carl Elliott (Democratic) 9.6%; ▌John H. Buchanan Jr. (Republican) 5.3%; ▌Thomas Abernethy (Republican) 5.2%; ▌Evan Foreman Jr. (Republican) 5.1%; ▌J. Chester Robinson (Republican) 1.2%
Alabama at-large	George W. Andrews; Redistricted from the 3rd district	Democratic	1944	Incumbent re-elected.	▌ ✓ George Huddleston Jr. (Democratic) 11.3%; ▌ ✓ Armistead I. Selden Jr. (Democratic) 11.0%; ▌ ✓ George W. Andrews (Democratic) 10.9%; ▌ ✓ George M. Grant (Democratic) 10.7%; ▌ ✓ Albert Rains (Democratic) 10.1%; ▌ ✓ Kenneth A. Roberts (Democratic) 10.0%; ▌ ✓ Robert E. Jones Jr. (Democratic) 9.6%; ▌ ✓ Carl Elliott (Democratic) 9.6%; ▌John H. Buchanan Jr. (Republican) 5.3%; ▌Thomas Abernethy (Republican) 5.2%; ▌Evan Foreman Jr. (Republican) 5.1%; ▌J. Chester Robinson (Republican) 1.2%
Alabama at-large	Kenneth A. Roberts; Redistricted from the 4th district	Democratic	1950	Incumbent re-elected.	▌ ✓ George Huddleston Jr. (Democratic) 11.3%; ▌ ✓ Armistead I. Selden Jr. (Democratic) 11.0%; ▌ ✓ George W. Andrews (Democratic) 10.9%; ▌ ✓ George M. Grant (Democratic) 10.7%; ▌ ✓ Albert Rains (Democratic) 10.1%; ▌ ✓ Kenneth A. Roberts (Democratic) 10.0%; ▌ ✓ Robert E. Jones Jr. (Democratic) 9.6%; ▌ ✓ Carl Elliott (Democratic) 9.6%; ▌John H. Buchanan Jr. (Republican) 5.3%; ▌Thomas Abernethy (Republican) 5.2%; ▌Evan Foreman Jr. (Republican) 5.1%; ▌J. Chester Robinson (Republican) 1.2%
Alabama at-large	Albert Rains; Redistricted from the 5th district	Democratic	1944	Incumbent re-elected.	▌ ✓ George Huddleston Jr. (Democratic) 11.3%; ▌ ✓ Armistead I. Selden Jr. (Democratic) 11.0%; ▌ ✓ George W. Andrews (Democratic) 10.9%; ▌ ✓ George M. Grant (Democratic) 10.7%; ▌ ✓ Albert Rains (Democratic) 10.1%; ▌ ✓ Kenneth A. Roberts (Democratic) 10.0%; ▌ ✓ Robert E. Jones Jr. (Democratic) 9.6%; ▌ ✓ Carl Elliott (Democratic) 9.6%; ▌John H. Buchanan Jr. (Republican) 5.3%; ▌Thomas Abernethy (Republican) 5.2%; ▌Evan Foreman Jr. (Republican) 5.1%; ▌J. Chester Robinson (Republican) 1.2%
Alabama at-large	Armistead I. Selden Jr. Redistricted from the 6th district	Democratic	1952	Incumbent re-elected.	▌ ✓ George Huddleston Jr. (Democratic) 11.3%; ▌ ✓ Armistead I. Selden Jr. (Democratic) 11.0%; ▌ ✓ George W. Andrews (Democratic) 10.9%; ▌ ✓ George M. Grant (Democratic) 10.7%; ▌ ✓ Albert Rains (Democratic) 10.1%; ▌ ✓ Kenneth A. Roberts (Democratic) 10.0%; ▌ ✓ Robert E. Jones Jr. (Democratic) 9.6%; ▌ ✓ Carl Elliott (Democratic) 9.6%; ▌John H. Buchanan Jr. (Republican) 5.3%; ▌Thomas Abernethy (Republican) 5.2%; ▌Evan Foreman Jr. (Republican) 5.1%; ▌J. Chester Robinson (Republican) 1.2%
Alabama at-large	Carl Elliott; Redistricted from the 7th district	Democratic	1948	Incumbent re-elected.	▌ ✓ George Huddleston Jr. (Democratic) 11.3%; ▌ ✓ Armistead I. Selden Jr. (Democratic) 11.0%; ▌ ✓ George W. Andrews (Democratic) 10.9%; ▌ ✓ George M. Grant (Democratic) 10.7%; ▌ ✓ Albert Rains (Democratic) 10.1%; ▌ ✓ Kenneth A. Roberts (Democratic) 10.0%; ▌ ✓ Robert E. Jones Jr. (Democratic) 9.6%; ▌ ✓ Carl Elliott (Democratic) 9.6%; ▌John H. Buchanan Jr. (Republican) 5.3%; ▌Thomas Abernethy (Republican) 5.2%; ▌Evan Foreman Jr. (Republican) 5.1%; ▌J. Chester Robinson (Republican) 1.2%
Alabama at-large	Robert E. Jones Jr. Redistricted from the 8th district	Democratic	1947 (special)	Incumbent re-elected.	▌ ✓ George Huddleston Jr. (Democratic) 11.3%; ▌ ✓ Armistead I. Selden Jr. (Democratic) 11.0%; ▌ ✓ George W. Andrews (Democratic) 10.9%; ▌ ✓ George M. Grant (Democratic) 10.7%; ▌ ✓ Albert Rains (Democratic) 10.1%; ▌ ✓ Kenneth A. Roberts (Democratic) 10.0%; ▌ ✓ Robert E. Jones Jr. (Democratic) 9.6%; ▌ ✓ Carl Elliott (Democratic) 9.6%; ▌John H. Buchanan Jr. (Republican) 5.3%; ▌Thomas Abernethy (Republican) 5.2%; ▌Evan Foreman Jr. (Republican) 5.1%; ▌J. Chester Robinson (Republican) 1.2%
Alabama at-large	George Huddleston Jr. Redistricted from the 9th district	Democratic	1954	Incumbent re-elected.	▌ ✓ George Huddleston Jr. (Democratic) 11.3%; ▌ ✓ Armistead I. Selden Jr. (Democratic) 11.0%; ▌ ✓ George W. Andrews (Democratic) 10.9%; ▌ ✓ George M. Grant (Democratic) 10.7%; ▌ ✓ Albert Rains (Democratic) 10.1%; ▌ ✓ Kenneth A. Roberts (Democratic) 10.0%; ▌ ✓ Robert E. Jones Jr. (Democratic) 9.6%; ▌ ✓ Carl Elliott (Democratic) 9.6%; ▌John H. Buchanan Jr. (Republican) 5.3%; ▌Thomas Abernethy (Republican) 5.2%; ▌Evan Foreman Jr. (Republican) 5.1%; ▌J. Chester Robinson (Republican) 1.2%
Alabama at-large	Frank W. Boykin; Redistricted from the 1st district	Democratic	1935 (special)	Incumbent lost renomination. Democratic loss.	▌ ✓ George Huddleston Jr. (Democratic) 11.3%; ▌ ✓ Armistead I. Selden Jr. (Democratic) 11.0%; ▌ ✓ George W. Andrews (Democratic) 10.9%; ▌ ✓ George M. Grant (Democratic) 10.7%; ▌ ✓ Albert Rains (Democratic) 10.1%; ▌ ✓ Kenneth A. Roberts (Democratic) 10.0%; ▌ ✓ Robert E. Jones Jr. (Democratic) 9.6%; ▌ ✓ Carl Elliott (Democratic) 9.6%; ▌John H. Buchanan Jr. (Republican) 5.3%; ▌Thomas Abernethy (Republican) 5.2%; ▌Evan Foreman Jr. (Republican) 5.1%; ▌J. Chester Robinson (Republican) 1.2%

== Alaska ==
State House Results

District	Incumbent			Results	Candidates
District	Member	Party	First elected	Results	Candidates
Alaska at-large	Ralph Rivers	Democratic	1958	Incumbent re-elected.	▌ ✓ Ralph Rivers (Democratic) 56.0%; ▌Lowell Thomas Jr. (Republican) 44.0%

== Arizona ==
Arizona gained one seat and formed a new third district out of the northern part of the state.

District	Incumbent			Results	Candidates
District	Member	Party	First elected	Results	Candidates
Arizona 1	John Jacob Rhodes	Republican	1952	Incumbent re-elected.	▌ ✓ John Jacob Rhodes (Republican) 58.7%; ▌Howard V. Peterson (Democratic) 41.3%
Arizona 2	Mo Udall	Democratic	1961 (special)	Incumbent re-elected.	▌ ✓ Mo Udall (Democratic) 58.3%; ▌Richard K. Burke (Republican) 41.7%
Arizona 3	None (new district)			New seat. Democratic gain.	▌ ✓ George F. Senner Jr. (Democratic) 56.0%; ▌John P. Clark (Republican) 44.0%

== Arkansas ==
Arkansas lost two seats and merged the 5th and 6th districts into the other districts. 5th district incumbent Dale Alford chose to run for governor rather than face Wilbur Mills in a primary, and 6th district incumbent Catherine Dorris Norrell retired after serving out the remainder of her husband's term.

District	Incumbent			Results	Candidates
District	Member	Party	First elected	Results	Candidates
Arkansas 1	Ezekiel C. Gathings	Democratic	1938	Incumbent re-elected.	▌ ✓ Ezekiel C. Gathings (Democratic); Unopposed
Arkansas 2	Wilbur Mills	Democratic	1938	Incumbent re-elected.	▌ ✓ Wilbur Mills (Democratic); Unopposed
Arkansas 2	Dale Alford; Redistricted from the 5th district	Democratic	1958	Incumbent retired to run for Governor of Arkansas. Democratic loss.	▌ ✓ Wilbur Mills (Democratic); Unopposed
Arkansas 3	James William Trimble	Democratic	1944	Incumbent re-elected.	▌ ✓ James William Trimble (Democratic) 69.3%; ▌Cy Carney Jr. (Republican) 30.7%
Arkansas 4	Oren Harris	Democratic	1940	Incumbent re-elected.	▌ ✓ Oren Harris (Democratic) 77.4%; ▌Warren Lieblong (Republican) 22.5%; ▌Frank Jarratt (Write-in) 0.03%
Arkansas 4	Catherine Dorris Norrell; Redistricted from the 6th district	Democratic	1961 (special)	Incumbent retired. Democratic loss.	▌ ✓ Oren Harris (Democratic) 77.4%; ▌Warren Lieblong (Republican) 22.5%; ▌Frank Jarratt (Write-in) 0.03%

== California ==
Eight new seats were gained in reapportionment, including 4 additional districts in Greater Los Angeles alone as well as others in San Diego, the Northern Central Valley, Alameda County, and the Central Coast, increasing the delegation from 30 to 38 seats. Seven of the new seats were won by Democrats, and one by a Republican. Two Republican incumbents lost re-election to Democrats and one Democratic incumbent lost to a Republican. Therefore, Democrats increased by nine seats and Republicans decreased by one.

District	Incumbent			Results	Candidates
District	Member	Party	First elected	Results	Candidates
California 1	Clem Miller	Democratic	1958	Incumbent died October 7, 1962 and re-elected posthumously.	▌ ✓ Clem Miller† (Democratic) 50.8%; ▌Don Clausen (Republican) 49.2%
California 2	Bizz Johnson	Democratic	1958	Incumbent re-elected.	▌ ✓ Bizz Johnson (Democratic) 64.6%; ▌Fredric H. Nagel (Republican) 35.4%
California 3	John E. Moss	Democratic	1952	Incumbent re-elected.	▌ ✓ John E. Moss (Democratic) 74.8%; ▌George W. G. Smith (Republican) 25.2%
California 4	None (new district)			New seat. Democratic gain.	▌ ✓ Robert Leggett (Democratic) 56.5%; ▌L. V. Honsinger (Republican) 43.5%
California 5	John F. Shelley	Democratic	1949 (special)	Incumbent re-elected.	▌ ✓ John F. Shelley (Democratic) 80.5%; ▌Roland S. Charles (Republican) 19.5%
California 6	William S. Mailliard; Redistricted from the 4th district	Republican	1952	Incumbent re-elected.	▌ ✓ William S. Mailliard (Republican) 58.7%; ▌John A. O'Connell (Democratic) 41.3%
California 7	Jeffery Cohelan	Democratic	1958	Incumbent re-elected.	▌ ✓ Jeffery Cohelan (Democratic) 64.5%; ▌Leonard L. Cantando (Republican) 35.5%
California 8	George P. Miller	Democratic	1944	Incumbent re-elected.	▌ ✓ George P. Miller (Democratic) 72.5%; ▌Harold Petersen (Republican) 27.5%
California 9	None (new district)			New seat. Democratic gain.	▌ ✓ Don Edwards (Democratic) 66.0%; ▌Joseph F. Donovan (Republican) 34.0%
California 10	Charles Gubser	Republican	1952	Incumbent re-elected.	▌ ✓ Charles Gubser (Republican) 60.7%; ▌James P. Thurber Jr. (Democratic) 39.3%
California 11	J. Arthur Younger; Redistricted from the 9th district	Republican	1952	Incumbent re-elected.	▌ ✓ J. Arthur Younger (Republican) 62.3%; ▌William J. Keller (Democratic) 37.7%
California 12	None (new district)			New seat. Republican gain.	▌ ✓ Burt Talcott (Republican) 61.3%; ▌William K. Steward (Democratic) 38.7%
California 13	Charles M. Teague	Republican	1954	Incumbent re-elected.	▌ ✓ Charles M. Teague (Republican) 64.9%; ▌George J. Holgate (Democratic) 35.1%
California 14	John F. Baldwin Jr. Redistricted from the 6th district	Republican	1954	Incumbent re-elected.	▌ ✓ John F. Baldwin Jr. (Republican) 62.9%; ▌Charles R. Weidner (Democratic) 37.1%
California 15	John J. McFall; Redistricted from the 11th district	Democratic	1956	Incumbent re-elected.	▌ ✓ John J. McFall (Democratic) 70.0%; ▌Arthur L. Young (Republican) 30.0%
California 16	B. F. Sisk; Redistricted from the 12th district	Democratic	1954	Incumbent re-elected.	▌ ✓ B. F. Sisk (Democratic) 71.9%; ▌Arthur L. Selland (Republican) 28.1%
California 17	Cecil R. King	Democratic	1942	Incumbent re-elected.	▌ ✓ Cecil R. King (Democratic) 67.2%; ▌Ted Bruinsma (Republican) 32.8%
California 18	Harlan Hagen; Redistricted from the 14th district	Democratic	1952	Incumbent re-elected.	▌ ✓ Harlan Hagen (Democratic) 58.9%; ▌G. Ray Arnett (Republican) 41.1%
California 19	Chet Holifield	Democratic	1942	Incumbent re-elected.	▌ ✓ Chet Holifield (Democratic) 61.6%; ▌Robert T. Ramsay (Republican) 38.4%
California 20	H. Allen Smith	Republican	1956	Incumbent re-elected.	▌ ✓ H. Allen Smith (Republican) 70.6%; ▌Leon Mayer (Democratic) 29.4%
California 21	None (new district)			New seat. Democratic gain.	▌ ✓ Augustus Hawkins (Democratic) 84.6%; ▌Herman Smith (Republican) 15.4%
California 22	James C. Corman	Democratic	1960	Incumbent re-elected.	▌ ✓ James C. Corman (Democratic) 53.6%; ▌Charles S. Foote (Republican) 46.4%
California 23	Clyde Doyle	Democratic	1948	Incumbent re-elected.	▌ ✓ Clyde Doyle (Democratic) 64.2%; ▌Del M. Clawson (Republican) 35.8%
California 24	Glenard P. Lipscomb	Republican	1953 (special)	Incumbent re-elected.	▌ ✓ Glenard P. Lipscomb (Republican) 70.3%; ▌Knox Mellon (Democratic) 29.7%
California 25	John H. Rousselot	Republican	1960	Incumbent lost re-election. Democratic gain.	▌ ✓ Ronald B. Cameron (Democratic) 53.6%; ▌John H. Rousselot (Republican) 46.4%
California 26	James Roosevelt	Democratic	1954	Incumbent re-elected.	▌ ✓ James Roosevelt (Democratic) 68.3%; ▌Daniel Beltz (Republican) 31.7%
California 27	Edgar W. Hiestand; Redistricted from the 21st district	Republican	1952	Incumbent lost re-election. Democratic gain.	▌ ✓ Everett G. Burkhalter (Democratic) 52.1%; ▌Edgar W. Hiestand (Republican) 47.9%
California 28	Alphonzo E. Bell Jr. Redistricted from the 16th district	Republican	1960	Incumbent re-elected.	▌ ✓ Alphonzo E. Bell Jr. (Republican) 64.0%; ▌Robert J. Felixson (Democratic) 36.0%
California 29	None (new district)			New seat. Democratic gain.	▌ ✓ George Brown Jr. (Democratic) 55.7%; ▌H. L. Richardson (Republican) 44.3%
California 30	Gordon L. McDonough; Redistricted from the 15th district	Republican	1944	Incumbent lost re-election. Democratic gain.	▌ ✓ Edward R. Roybal (Democratic) 56.5%; ▌Gordon L. McDonough (Republican) 43.5%
California 31	None (new district)			New seat. Democratic gain.	▌ ✓ Charles H. Wilson (Democratic) 52.2%; ▌Gordon Hahn (Republican) 47.8%
California 32	Craig Hosmer; Redistricted from the 18th district	Republican	1952	Incumbent re-elected.	▌ ✓ Craig Hosmer (Republican) 70.8%; ▌J. J. Johovich (Democratic) 29.2%
California 33	Harry R. Sheppard; Redistricted from the 27th district	Democratic	1936	Incumbent re-elected.	▌ ✓ Harry R. Sheppard (Democratic) 59.0%; ▌William R. Thomas (Republican) 41.0%
California 34	None (new district)			New seat. Democratic gain.	▌ ✓ Richard T. Hanna (Democratic) 55.9%; ▌Robert A. Geier (Republican) 44.1%
California 35	James B. Utt; Redistricted from the 28th district	Republican	1952	Incumbent re-elected.	▌ ✓ James B. Utt (Republican) 68.5%; ▌Burton Shamsky (Democratic) 31.5%
California 36	Bob Wilson; Redistricted from the 30th district	Republican	1952	Incumbent re-elected.	▌ ✓ Bob Wilson (Republican) 61.8%; ▌William C. Godfrey (Democratic) 38.2%
California 37	None (new district)			New seat. Democratic gain.	▌ ✓ Lionel Van Deerlin (Democratic) 51.4%; ▌Dick Wilson (Republican) 48.6%
California 38	Dalip Singh Saund; Redistricted from the 29th district	Democratic	1956	Incumbent lost re-election. Republican gain.	▌ ✓ Patrick M. Martin (Republican) 55.9%; ▌Dalip Singh Saund (Democratic) 44.1%

== Colorado ==
District	Incumbent			Results	Candidates
District	Member	Party	First elected	Results	Candidates
Colorado 1	Byron G. Rogers	Democratic	1950	Incumbent re-elected.	▌ ✓ Byron G. Rogers (Democratic) 56.0%; ▌William B. Chenoweth (Republican) 44.0%
Colorado 2	Peter H. Dominick	Republican	1960	Incumbent retired to run for U.S. senator. Republican hold.	▌ ✓ Donald G. Brotzman (Republican) 61.8%; ▌Conrad L. McBride (Democratic) 38.2%
Colorado 3	John Chenoweth	Republican	1950	Incumbent re-elected.	▌ ✓ John Chenoweth (Republican) 54.7%; ▌ Albert J. Tomsic (Democratic) 45.3%
Colorado 4	Wayne N. Aspinall	Democratic	1948	Incumbent re-elected.	▌ ✓ Wayne N. Aspinall (Democratic) 58.6%; ▌Leo L. Sommerville (Republican) 41.4%

== Connecticut ==
District	Incumbent			Results	Candidates
District	Member	Party	First elected	Results	Candidates
Connecticut 1	Emilio Q. Daddario	Democratic	1958	Incumbent re-elected.	▌ ✓ Emilio Q. Daddario (Democratic) 57.5%; ▌James F. Collins (Republican) 41.9%; ▌Donald B. LaCroix (Write-in) 0.6%
Connecticut 2	Horace Seely-Brown Jr.	Republican	1960	Incumbent retired to run for U.S. senator. Democratic gain.	▌ ✓ William St. Onge (Democratic) 50.8%; ▌Moses A. Savin (Republican) 49.2%
Connecticut 3	Robert Giaimo	Democratic	1958	Incumbent re-elected.	▌ ✓ Robert Giaimo (Democratic) 56.0%; ▌Daniel Reinhardsen (Republican) 44.0%
Connecticut 4	Abner W. Sibal	Republican	1960	Incumbent re-elected.	▌ ✓ Abner W. Sibal (Republican) 52.0%; ▌Francis X. Lennon Jr. (Democratic) 48.0%
Connecticut 5	John S. Monagan	Democratic	1958	Incumbent re-elected.	▌ ✓ John S. Monagan (Democratic) 58.5%; ▌John Rand (Republican) 41.5%
Connecticut at-large	Frank Kowalski	Democratic	1958	Incumbent retired to run for U.S. senator. Democratic hold.	▌ ✓ Bernard F. Grabowski (Democratic) 52.7%; ▌John Lupton (Republican) 47.3%

== Delaware ==
District	Incumbent			Results	Candidates
District	Member	Party	First elected	Results	Candidates
Delaware at-large	Harris McDowell	Democratic	1958	Incumbent re-elected.	▌ ✓ Harris McDowell (Democratic) 53.0%; ▌Wilmer F. Williams (Republican) 47.0%

== Florida ==
Florida gained 4 new districts at reapportionment: the 3rd around Miami, the 9th in the Panhandle, the 10th around Tampa, and the 11th in Orlando and the nearby Atlantic coast.

District	Incumbent			Results	Candidates
District	Member	Party	First elected	Results	Candidates
Florida 1	Bob Sikes; Redistricted from the 3rd district	Democratic	1940; 1944 (resigned); 1974	Incumbent re-elected.	▌ ✓ Bob Sikes (Democratic) 81.9%; ▌M. M. Woolley (Republican) 18.1%
Florida 2	Charles E. Bennett	Democratic	1948	Incumbent re-elected.	▌ ✓ Charles E. Bennett (Democratic); Unopposed
Florida 3	None (new district)			New seat. Democratic gain.	▌ ✓ Claude Pepper (Democratic) 57.6%; ▌Robert A. Peterson (Republican) 42.4%
Florida 4	Dante Fascell	Democratic	1954	Incumbent re-elected.	▌ ✓ Dante Fascell (Democratic) 64.5%; ▌J. C. McGlon Jr. (Republican) 35.5%
Florida 5	Syd Herlong	Democratic	1948	Incumbent re-elected.	▌ ✓ Syd Herlong (Democratic) 65.2%; ▌Hubert H. Hevey Jr. (Republican) 34.8%
Florida 6	Paul Rogers	Democratic	1954	Incumbent re-elected.	▌ ✓ Paul Rogers (Democratic) 64.2%; ▌Frederick A. Kibbe (Republican) 35.8%
Florida 7	James A. Haley	Democratic	1952	Incumbent re-elected.	▌ ✓ James A. Haley (Democratic) 66.8%; ▌F. Onell Rogers (Republican) 33.2%
Florida 8	D. R. Matthews	Democratic	1952	Incumbent re-elected.	▌ ✓ D. R. Matthews (Democratic); Unopposed
Florida 9	None (new district)			New seat. Democratic gain.	▌ ✓ Don Fuqua (Democratic) 75.4%; ▌Wilfred C. Varn (Republican) 24.6%
Florida 10	None (new district)			New seat. Democratic gain.	▌ ✓ Sam Gibbons (Democratic) 70.6%; ▌Victor A. Rule (Republican) 29.4%
Florida 11	None (new district)			New seat. Republican gain.	▌ ✓ Edward Gurney (Republican) 51.9%; ▌John A. Sutton (Democratic) 48.1%
Florida 12	William C. Cramer; Redistricted from the 1st district	Republican	1954	Incumbent re-elected.	▌ ✓ William C. Cramer (Republican) 64.5%; ▌Grover C. Criswell (Democratic) 35.5%

== Georgia ==
District	Incumbent			Results	Candidates
District	Member	Party	First elected	Results	Candidates
Georgia 1	G. Elliott Hagan	Democratic	1960	Incumbent re-elected.	▌ ✓ G. Elliott Hagan (Democratic); Unopposed
Georgia 2	J. L. Pilcher	Democratic	1953 (special)	Incumbent re-elected.	▌ ✓ J. L. Pilcher (Democratic); Unopposed
Georgia 3	Tic Forrester	Democratic	1950	Incumbent re-elected.	▌ ✓ Tic Forrester (Democratic); Unopposed
Georgia 4	John Flynt	Democratic	1954	Incumbent re-elected.	▌ ✓ John Flynt (Democratic); Unopposed
Georgia 5	James C. Davis	Democratic	1946	Incumbent lost renomination. Democratic hold.	▌ ✓ Charles L. Weltner (Democratic) 55.6%; ▌L. J. O'Callaghan (Republican) 44.4%
Georgia 6	Carl Vinson	Democratic	1914	Incumbent re-elected.	▌ ✓ Carl Vinson (Democratic); Unopposed
Georgia 7	John William Davis	Democratic	1960	Incumbent re-elected.	▌ ✓ John William Davis (Democratic) 72.4%; ▌E. Ralph Ivey (Republican) 27.6%
Georgia 8	Iris Faircloth Blitch	Democratic	1954	Incumbent retired. Democratic hold.	▌ ✓ J. Russell Tuten (Democratic); Unopposed
Georgia 9	Phillip M. Landrum	Democratic	1952	Incumbent re-elected.	▌ ✓ Phillip M. Landrum (Democratic); Unopposed
Georgia 10	Robert Grier Stephens Jr.	Democratic	1960	Incumbent re-elected.	▌ ✓ Robert Grier Stephens Jr. (Democratic); Unopposed

== Hawaii ==
Hawaii gained a second seat at reapportionment and elected both seats at-large.

District	Incumbent			Results	Candidates
District	Member	Party	First elected	Results	Candidates
Hawaii at-large	Daniel Inouye	Democratic	1959	Incumbent retired to run for U.S. senator. Democratic hold.	▌ ✓ Thomas Gill (Democratic) 33.9%; ▌ ✓ Spark Matsunaga (Democratic) 33.9%; ▌Albert W. Evensen (Republican) 19.5%; ▌Richard Sutton (Republican) 12.7%
Hawaii at-large	None (new district)			New seat. Democratic gain.	▌ ✓ Thomas Gill (Democratic) 33.9%; ▌ ✓ Spark Matsunaga (Democratic) 33.9%; ▌Albert W. Evensen (Republican) 19.5%; ▌Richard Sutton (Republican) 12.7%

== Idaho ==
District	Incumbent			Results	Candidates
District	Member	Party	First elected	Results	Candidates
Idaho 1	Gracie Pfost	Democratic	1952	Incumbent retired to run for U.S. senator. Democratic hold.	▌ ✓ Compton I. White Jr. (Democratic) 53.0%; ▌Erwin H. Schwiebert (Republican) 47.0%
Idaho 2	Ralph R. Harding	Democratic	1960	Incumbent re-elected.	▌ ✓ Ralph R. Harding (Democratic) 52.8%; ▌Orval H. Hansen (Republican) 47.2%

== Illinois ==
Illinois lost one seat at reapportionment, merging the existing 21st district into the 20th and 23rd, and the Chicago districts were realigned to give more representation to the suburbs.

District	Incumbent			Results	Candidates
District	Member	Party	First elected	Results	Candidates
Illinois 1	William L. Dawson	Democratic	1942	Incumbent re-elected.	▌ ✓ William L. Dawson (Democratic) 74.1%; ▌Benjamin C. Duster (Republican) 25.9%
Illinois 2	Barratt O'Hara	Democratic	1948; 1950 (lost); 1952	Incumbent re-elected.	▌ ✓ Barratt O'Hara (Democratic) 62.3%; ▌Philip G. Bixler (Republican) 37.7%
Illinois 3	William T. Murphy	Democratic	1958	Incumbent re-elected.	▌ ✓ William T. Murphy (Democratic) 51.6%; ▌Ernest E. Michaels (Republican) 48.4%
Illinois 4	Ed Derwinski	Republican	1958	Incumbent re-elected.	▌ ✓ Ed Derwinski (Republican) 64.9%; ▌Richard E. Friedman (Democratic) 35.1%
Illinois 5	John C. Kluczynski	Democratic	1950	Incumbent re-elected.	▌ ✓ John C. Kluczynski (Democratic) 63.4%; ▌Joseph Potempa (Republican) 36.6%
Illinois 6	Thomas J. O'Brien	Democratic	1942	Incumbent re-elected.	▌ ✓ Thomas J. O'Brien (Democratic) 77.7%; ▌Adolph Herda (Republican) 22.3%
Illinois 7	Roland V. Libonati	Democratic	1957 (special)	Incumbent re-elected.	▌ ✓ Roland V. Libonati (Democratic) 78.8%; ▌Joseph D. Day (Republican) 21.2%
Illinois 8	Dan Rostenkowski	Democratic	1958	Incumbent re-elected.	▌ ✓ Dan Rostenkowski (Democratic) 60.8%; ▌Irvin R. Techon (Republican) 39.2%
Illinois 9	Sidney R. Yates	Democratic	1948	Incumbent retired to run for U.S. senator. Democratic loss.	▌ ✓ Edward Rowan Finnegan (Democratic) 54.8%; ▌Thomas E. Ward (Republican) 45.2%
Illinois 9	Edward Rowan Finnegan; Redistricted from the 12th district	Democratic	1960	Incumbent re-elected.	▌ ✓ Edward Rowan Finnegan (Democratic) 54.8%; ▌Thomas E. Ward (Republican) 45.2%
Illinois 10	Harold R. Collier	Republican	1956	Incumbent re-elected.	▌ ✓ Harold R. Collier (Republican) 66.6%; ▌Joseph A. Salerno (Democratic) 33.4%
Illinois 11	Roman Pucinski	Democratic	1958	Incumbent re-elected.	▌ ✓ Roman Pucinski (Democratic) 52.7%; ▌Henry Hyde (Republican) 47.3%
Illinois 12	None (new district)			New seat. Republican gain.	▌ ✓ Robert McClory (Republican) 63.9%; ▌John C. Kimball (Democratic) 36.1%
Illinois 13	Marguerite S. Church	Republican	1950	Incumbent retired. Republican hold.	▌ ✓ Donald Rumsfeld (Republican) 63.7%; ▌John A. Kennedy (Democratic) 36.3%
Illinois 14	Elmer J. Hoffman	Republican	1958	Incumbent re-elected.	▌ ✓ Elmer J. Hoffman (Republican) 59.7%; ▌Jerome M. Ziegler (Democratic) 40.3%
Illinois 15	Noah M. Mason	Republican	1936	Incumbent retired. Republican hold.	▌ ✓ Charlotte Thompson Reid (Republican) 61.1%; ▌Stanley H. Cowan (Democratic) 38.9%
Illinois 16	John B. Anderson	Republican	1960	Incumbent re-elected.	▌ ✓ John B. Anderson (Republican) 66.9%; ▌Walter S. Busky (Democratic) 33.1%
Illinois 17	Leslie C. Arends	Republican	1934	Incumbent re-elected.	▌ ✓ Leslie C. Arends (Republican) 62.5%; ▌Donald M. Laughlin (Democratic) 37.5%
Illinois 18	Robert H. Michel	Republican	1956	Incumbent re-elected.	▌ ✓ Robert H. Michel (Republican) 61.2%; ▌Francis D. Nash (Democratic) 38.8%
Illinois 19	Robert B. Chiperfield	Republican	1938	Incumbent retired. Republican hold.	▌ ✓ Robert T. McLoskey (Republican) 55.9%; ▌David DeDoncker (Democratic) 44.1%
Illinois 20	Paul Findley	Republican	1960	Incumbent re-elected.	▌ ✓ Paul Findley (Republican) 52.9%; ▌Peter F. Mack Jr. (Democratic) 47.1%
Illinois 20	Peter F. Mack Jr. Redistricted from the 21st district	Democratic	1948	Incumbent lost re-election. Democratic loss.	▌ ✓ Paul Findley (Republican) 52.9%; ▌Peter F. Mack Jr. (Democratic) 47.1%
Illinois 21	Kenneth J. Gray; Redistricted from the 25th district	Democratic	1954	Incumbent re-elected.	▌ ✓ Kenneth J. Gray (Democratic) 60.0%; ▌Frank H. Walker (Republican) 40.0%
Illinois 22	William L. Springer	Republican	1950	Incumbent re-elected.	▌ ✓ William L. Springer (Republican) 59.7%; ▌Bob Wilson (Democratic) 40.3%
Illinois 23	George E. Shipley	Democratic	1958	Incumbent re-elected.	▌ ✓ George E. Shipley (Democratic) 51.7%; ▌Edward H. Jenison (Republican) 48.3%
Illinois 24	Melvin Price	Democratic	1944	Incumbent re-elected.	▌ ✓ Melvin Price (Democratic) 73.8%; ▌Kurt Glaser (Republican) 26.2%

== Indiana ==
District	Incumbent			Results	Candidates
District	Member	Party	First elected	Results	Candidates
Indiana 1	Ray Madden	Democratic	1942	Incumbent re-elected.	▌ ✓ Ray Madden (Democratic) 60.5%; ▌Harold Moody (Republican) 39.0%; Harry C. Beamer (Prohibition) 0.5%
Indiana 2	Charles A. Halleck	Republican	1935 (special)	Incumbent re-elected.	▌ ✓ Charles A. Halleck (Republican) 57.6%; ▌John J. Murray (Democratic) 42.4%
Indiana 3	John Brademas	Democratic	1958	Incumbent re-elected.	▌ ✓ John Brademas (Democratic) 51.9%; ▌Charles W. Ainlay (Republican) 48.1%
Indiana 4	E. Ross Adair	Republican	1950	Incumbent re-elected.	▌ ✓ E. Ross Adair (Republican) 55.6%; ▌Ronald R. Ross (Democratic) 44.4%
Indiana 5	J. Edward Roush	Democratic	1958	Incumbent re-elected.	▌ ✓ J. Edward Roush (Democratic) 51.6%; ▌George O. Chambers (Republican) 48.4%
Indiana 6	Richard L. Roudebush	Republican	1960	Incumbent re-elected.	▌ ✓ Richard L. Roudebush (Republican) 52.7%; ▌Fred Wampler (Democratic) 47.3%
Indiana 7	William G. Bray	Republican	1950	Incumbent re-elected.	▌ ✓ William G. Bray (Republican) 57.8%; ▌Elden C. Tipton (Democratic) 42.2%
Indiana 8	Winfield K. Denton	Democratic	1954	Incumbent re-elected.	▌ ✓ Winfield K. Denton (Democratic) 55.7%; ▌Earl J. Heseman (Republican) 44.3%
Indiana 9	Earl Wilson	Republican	1960	Incumbent re-elected.	▌ ✓ Earl Wilson (Republican) 52.1%; ▌John Pritchard (Democratic) 47.9%
Indiana 10	Ralph Harvey	Republican	1960	Incumbent re-elected.	▌ ✓ Ralph Harvey (Republican) 52.9%; ▌John E. Mitchell (Democratic) 47.1%
Indiana 11	Donald C. Bruce	Republican	1960	Incumbent re-elected.	▌ ✓ Donald C. Bruce (Republican) 54.2%; ▌Andrew Jacobs Jr. (Democratic) 45.8%

== Iowa ==
Iowa lost one seat at reapportionment and divided the existing 6th district in north-central Iowa among several neighboring districts with compensating boundary changes elsewhere. Incumbent Merwin Coad chose to retire rather than run against one of the other incumbents.

District	Incumbent			Results	Candidates
District	Member	Party	First elected	Results	Candidates
Iowa 1	Fred Schwengel	Republican	1954	Incumbent re-elected.	▌ ✓ Fred Schwengel (Republican) 61.1%; ▌Harold Stephens (Democratic) 38.9%
Iowa 2	James E. Bromwell	Republican	1960	Incumbent re-elected.	▌ ✓ James E. Bromwell (Republican) 52.8%; ▌Frank W. Less (Democratic) 47.2%
Iowa 3	H. R. Gross	Republican	1948	Incumbent re-elected.	▌ ✓ H. R. Gross (Republican) 56.7%; ▌Neel F. Hill (Democratic) 43.3%
Iowa 4	John Henry Kyl	Republican	1959 (special)	Incumbent re-elected.	▌ ✓ John Henry Kyl (Republican) 55.8%; ▌Gene W. Glenn (Democratic) 44.2%
Iowa 5	Neal Smith	Democratic	1958	Incumbent re-elected.	▌ ✓ Neal Smith (Democratic) 62.8%; ▌Sonja Egenes (Republican) 37.2%
Iowa 5	Merwin Coad; Redistricted from the 6th district	Democratic	1956	Incumbent retired. Democratic loss.	▌ ✓ Neal Smith (Democratic) 62.8%; ▌Sonja Egenes (Republican) 37.2%
Iowa 6	Charles B. Hoeven; Redistricted from the 8th district	Republican	1942	Incumbent re-elected.	▌ ✓ Charles B. Hoeven (Republican) 58.5%; ▌Donald W. Murray (Democratic) 41.5%
Iowa 7	Ben F. Jensen	Republican	1938	Incumbent re-elected.	▌ ✓ Ben F. Jensen (Republican) 56.1%; ▌Ed Peters (Democratic) 43.9%

== Kansas ==
Kansas lost one seat at reapportionment and redistricted from 6 to 5, combining the existing southwestern 5th and northwestern 6th districts into a single district, in which incumbents J. Floyd Breeding and Bob Dole ran against each other, and making modest boundary changes elsewhere.

District	Incumbent			Results	Candidates
District	Member	Party	First elected	Results	Candidates
Kansas 1	Bob Dole; Redistricted from the 6th district	Republican	1960	Incumbent re-elected.	▌ ✓ Bob Dole (Republican) 55.8%; ▌J. Floyd Breeding (Democratic) 44.2%
Kansas 1	J. Floyd Breeding; Redistricted from the 5th district	Democratic	1956	Incumbent lost re-election Democratic loss.	▌ ✓ Bob Dole (Republican) 55.8%; ▌J. Floyd Breeding (Democratic) 44.2%
Kansas 2	William H. Avery; Redistricted from the 1st district	Republican	1954	Incumbent re-elected.	▌ ✓ William H. Avery (Republican) 65.2%; ▌Harry F. Kehoe (Democratic) 34.8%
Kansas 3	Robert Ellsworth; Redistricted from the 2nd district	Republican	1960	Incumbent re-elected.	▌ ✓ Robert Ellsworth (Republican) 63.4%; ▌Bill Sparks (Democratic) 36.6%
Kansas 4	Garner E. Shriver	Republican	1960	Incumbent re-elected.	▌ ✓ Garner E. Shriver (Republican) 66.6%; ▌Lawrence J. Wetzel (Democratic) 33.4%
Kansas 5	Walter L. McVey Jr. Redistricted from the 3rd district	Republican	1960	Incumbent lost renomination. Republican hold.	▌ ✓ Joe Skubitz (Republican) 53.3%; ▌Wade A. Myers (Democratic) 46.7%

== Kentucky ==
Kentucky lost one seat at reapportionment. 5th district incumbent Brent Spence elected to retire, and his district was divided between several other districts with the lion's share going to the 4th.

District	Incumbent			Results	Candidates
District	Member	Party	First elected	Results	Candidates
Kentucky 1	Frank Stubblefield	Democratic	1958	Incumbent re-elected.	▌ ✓ Frank Stubblefield (Democratic); Unopposed
Kentucky 2	William Natcher	Democratic	1953 (special)	Incumbent re-elected.	▌ ✓ William Natcher (Democratic); Unopposed
Kentucky 3	Frank W. Burke	Democratic	1958	Incumbent lost re-election. Republican gain.	▌ ✓ Gene Snyder (Republican) 50.8%; ▌Frank W. Burke (Democratic) 49.2%
Kentucky 4	Frank Chelf	Democratic	1944	Incumbent re-elected.	▌ ✓ Frank Chelf (Democratic) 52.9%; ▌Clyde Middleton (Republican) 47.1%
Kentucky 4	Brent Spence; Redistricted from the 5th district	Democratic	1930	Incumbent retired. Democratic loss.	▌ ✓ Frank Chelf (Democratic) 52.9%; ▌Clyde Middleton (Republican) 47.1%
Kentucky 5	Eugene Siler; Redistricted from the 8th district	Republican	1954	Incumbent re-elected.	▌ ✓ Eugene Siler (Republican); Unopposed
Kentucky 6	John C. Watts	Democratic	1951 (special)	Incumbent re-elected.	▌ ✓ John C. Watts (Democratic); Unopposed
Kentucky 7	Carl D. Perkins	Democratic	1948	Incumbent re-elected.	▌ ✓ Carl D. Perkins (Democratic) 56.7%; ▌C. Alex Parker Jr. (Republican) 42.5%; ▌Rex Henrickson (Independent) 0.7%

== Louisiana ==
District	Incumbent			Results	Candidates
District	Member	Party	First elected	Results	Candidates
Louisiana 1	F. Edward Hébert	Democratic	1940	Incumbent re-elected.	▌ ✓ F. Edward Hébert (Democratic); Unopposed
Louisiana 2	Hale Boggs	Democratic	1940; 1942 (lost); 1946	Incumbent re-elected.	▌ ✓ Hale Boggs (Democratic) 67.2%; ▌Dave Treen (Republican) 32.8%
Louisiana 3	Edwin E. Willis	Democratic	1948	Incumbent re-elected.	▌ ✓ Edwin E. Willis (Democratic); Unopposed
Louisiana 4	Joe Waggonner	Democratic	1961 (special)	Incumbent re-elected.	▌ ✓ Joe Waggonner (Democratic); Unopposed
Louisiana 5	Otto Passman	Democratic	1946	Incumbent re-elected.	▌ ✓ Otto Passman (Democratic); Unopposed
Louisiana 6	James H. Morrison	Democratic	1942	Incumbent re-elected.	▌ ✓ James H. Morrison (Democratic); Unopposed
Louisiana 7	T. Ashton Thompson	Democratic	1952	Incumbent re-elected.	▌ ✓ T. Ashton Thompson (Democratic); Unopposed
Louisiana 8	Harold B. McSween	Democratic	1958	Incumbent lost renomination. Democratic hold.	▌ ✓ Gillis William Long (Democratic) 64.0%; ▌Jack W. Lewis (Republican) 36.0%

== Maine ==
Maine lost one seat at reapportionment, redistricting from 3 seats to 2 -- a 1st district containing the coastal parts of the existing 1st and 2nd districts, and a 2nd district containing the existing 3rd district and the rest of inland Maine.

District	Incumbent			Results	Candidates
District	Member	Party	First elected	Results	Candidates
Maine 1	Peter A. Garland	Republican	1960	Incumbent lost renomination. Republican loss.	▌ ✓ Stanley R. Tupper (Republican) 59.6%; ▌Ronald Kellam (Democratic) 40.4%
Maine 1	Stanley R. Tupper; Redistricted from the 2nd district	Republican	1960	Incumbent re-elected.	▌ ✓ Stanley R. Tupper (Republican) 59.6%; ▌Ronald Kellam (Democratic) 40.4%
Maine 2	Clifford McIntire; Redistricted from the 3rd district	Republican	1951 (special)	Incumbent re-elected.	▌ ✓ Clifford McIntire (Republican) 51.1%; ▌William Hathaway (Democratic) 48.9%

== Maryland ==
Maryland gained an eighth seat at reapportionment and chose to elect it at-large.

District	Incumbent			Results	Candidates
District	Member	Party	First elected	Results	Candidates
Maryland 1	Thomas Francis Johnson	Democratic	1958	Incumbent lost re-election. Republican gain.	▌ ✓ Rogers Morton (Republican) 53.2%; ▌Thomas Francis Johnson (Democratic) 46.8%
Maryland 2	Daniel Brewster	Democratic	1958	Incumbent retired to run for U.S. senator. Democratic hold.	▌ ✓ Clarence Long (Democratic) 51.9%; ▌J. Fife Symington Jr. (Republican) 48.1%
Maryland 3	Edward Garmatz	Democratic	1947 (special)	Incumbent re-elected.	▌ ✓ Edward Garmatz (Democratic); Unopposed
Maryland 4	George Hyde Fallon	Democratic	1944	Incumbent re-elected.	▌ ✓ George Hyde Fallon (Democratic) 72.3%; ▌John E. Brandau (Republican) 27.7%
Maryland 5	Richard Lankford	Democratic	1954	Incumbent re-elected.	▌ ✓ Richard Lankford (Democratic) 59.5%; ▌Joseph M. Baker Jr. (Republican) 40.5%
Maryland 6	Charles Mathias	Republican	1960	Incumbent re-elected.	▌ ✓ Charles Mathias (Republican) 60.9%; ▌John R. Foley (Democratic) 39.1%
Maryland 7	Samuel Friedel	Democratic	1952	Incumbent re-elected.	▌ ✓ Samuel Friedel (Democratic) 70.0%; ▌Caroline R. Ramsay (Republican) 30.0%
Maryland at-large	None (new district)			New seat. Democratic gain.	▌ ✓ Carlton R. Sickles (Democratic) 55.7%; ▌Newton Steers (Republican) 44.3%

== Massachusetts ==
Massachusetts lost two seats at reapportionment, one from each party.

District	Incumbent			Results	Candidates
District	Member	Party	First elected	Results	Candidates
Massachusetts 1	Silvio O. Conte	Republican	1958	Incumbent re-elected.	▌ ✓ Silvio O. Conte (Republican) 74.4%; ▌William K. Hefner (Democratic) 25.6%
Massachusetts 2	Edward Boland	Democratic	1952	Incumbent re-elected.	▌ ✓ Edward Boland (Democratic) 67.8%; ▌Samuel S. Rodman Jr. (Republican) 32.2%
Massachusetts 3	Philip J. Philbin	Democratic	1942	Incumbent re-elected.	▌ ✓ Philip J. Philbin (Democratic) 72.4%; ▌Frank Anthony (Republican) 27.6%
Massachusetts 4	Harold Donohue	Democratic	1946	Incumbent re-elected.	▌ ✓ Harold Donohue (Democratic) 90.5%; ▌Stanley E. Shogren (Prohibition) 9.5%
Massachusetts 5	F. Bradford Morse	Republican	1960	Incumbent re-elected.	▌ ✓ F. Bradford Morse (Republican) 57.4%; ▌Thomas J. Lane (Democratic) 42.6%
Massachusetts 5	Thomas J. Lane; Redistricted from the 7th district	Democratic	1941 (special)	Incumbent lost re-election. Democratic loss.	▌ ✓ F. Bradford Morse (Republican) 57.4%; ▌Thomas J. Lane (Democratic) 42.6%
Massachusetts 6	William H. Bates	Republican	1950	Incumbent re-elected.	▌ ✓ William H. Bates (Republican) 56.2%; ▌George J. O'Shea Jr. (Democratic) 43.8%
Massachusetts 7	Torbert Macdonald; Redistricted from the 8th district	Democratic	1954	Incumbent re-elected.	▌ ✓ Torbert Macdonald (Democratic) 71.6%; ▌Gordon F. Hughes (Republican) 28.4%
Massachusetts 8	Tip O'Neill; Redistricted from the 11th district	Democratic	1952	Incumbent re-elected.	▌ ✓ Tip O'Neill (Democratic) 73.0%; ▌Howard Greyber (Republican) 27.0%
Massachusetts 9	John W. McCormack; Redistricted from the 12th district	Democratic	1928	Incumbent re-elected.	▌ ✓ John W. McCormack (Democratic); Unopposed
Massachusetts 10	Laurence Curtis	Republican	1952	Incumbent retired to run for U.S. senator. Republican loss.	▌ ✓ Joseph W. Martin Jr. (Republican) 65.5%; ▌Edward F. Doolan (Democratic) 34.5%
Massachusetts 10	Joseph W. Martin Jr. Redistricted from the 14th district	Republican	1924	Incumbent re-elected.	▌ ✓ Joseph W. Martin Jr. (Republican) 65.5%; ▌Edward F. Doolan (Democratic) 34.5%
Massachusetts 11	James A. Burke; Redistricted from the 13th district	Democratic	1958	Incumbent re-elected.	▌ ✓ James A. Burke (Democratic) 64.3%; ▌Harry F. Stimpson Jr. (Republican) 35.7%
Massachusetts 12	Hastings Keith; Redistricted from the 9th district	Republican	1958	Incumbent re-elected.	▌ ✓ Hastings Keith (Republican) 64.2%; ▌Alexander Byron (Democratic) 35.8%

== Michigan ==
Michigan gained one seat at reapportionment, which it elected at-large rather than redistricting.

District	Incumbent			Results	Candidates
District	Member	Party	First elected	Results	Candidates
Michigan 1	Lucien Nedzi	Democratic	1961 (special)	Incumbent re-elected.	▌ ✓ Lucien Nedzi (Democratic) 89.2%; ▌Walter Czarnecki (Republican) 10.8%
Michigan 2	George Meader	Republican	1950	Incumbent re-elected.	▌ ✓ George Meader (Republican) 58.4%; ▌Thomas P. Payne (Democratic) 41.6%
Michigan 3	August E. Johansen	Republican	1954	Incumbent re-elected.	▌ ✓ August E. Johansen (Republican) 59.5%; ▌Paul H. Todd Jr. (Democratic) 40.5%
Michigan 4	Clare E. Hoffman	Republican	1934	Incumbent retired. Republican hold.	▌ ✓ J. Edward Hutchinson (Republican) 63.8%; ▌Edward Burns (Democratic) 36.2%
Michigan 5	Gerald Ford	Republican	1948	Incumbent re-elected.	▌ ✓ Gerald Ford (Republican) 67.0%; ▌William G. Reamon (Democratic) 33.0%
Michigan 6	Charles E. Chamberlain	Republican	1956	Incumbent re-elected.	▌ ✓ Charles E. Chamberlain (Republican) 54.5%; ▌Donald Hayworth (Democratic) 45.5%
Michigan 7	James G. O'Hara	Democratic	1958	Incumbent re-elected.	▌ ✓ James G. O'Hara (Democratic) 56.3%; ▌H. Charles Knill (Republican) 43.7%
Michigan 8	R. James Harvey	Republican	1960	Incumbent re-elected.	▌ ✓ R. James Harvey (Republican) 60.5%; ▌Jerome T. Hart (Democratic) 39.5%
Michigan 9	Robert P. Griffin	Republican	1956	Incumbent re-elected.	▌ ✓ Robert P. Griffin (Republican) 59.4%; ▌Donald G. Jennings (Democratic) 40.6%
Michigan 10	Al Cederberg	Republican	1952	Incumbent re-elected.	▌ ✓ Al Cederberg (Republican) 61.5%; ▌Hubert C. Evans (Democratic) 38.5%
Michigan 11	Victor A. Knox	Republican	1952	Incumbent re-elected.	▌ ✓ Victor A. Knox (Republican) 56.7%; ▌Warren P. Cleary (Democratic) 43.3%
Michigan 12	John B. Bennett	Republican	1946	Incumbent re-elected.	▌ ✓ John B. Bennett (Republican) 63.3%; ▌William J. Bolognesi (Democratic) 36.7%
Michigan 13	Charles Diggs	Democratic	1954	Incumbent re-elected.	▌ ✓ Charles Diggs (Democratic) 71.2%; ▌Robert B. Blackwell (Republican) 28.8%
Michigan 14	Harold M. Ryan	Democratic	1962 (special)	Incumbent re-elected.	▌ ✓ Harold M. Ryan (Democratic) 61.8%; ▌Lois V. Nair (Republican) 38.2%
Michigan 15	John Dingell	Democratic	1955 (special)	Incumbent re-elected.	▌ ✓ John Dingell (Democratic) 83.0%; ▌Ernest Richard (Republican) 17.0%
Michigan 16	John Lesinski Jr.	Democratic	1950	Incumbent re-elected.	▌ ✓ John Lesinski Jr. (Democratic) 67.9%; ▌Laverne O. Elliott (Republican) 32.1%
Michigan 17	Martha Griffiths	Democratic	1954	Incumbent re-elected.	▌ ✓ Martha Griffiths (Democratic) 59.3%; ▌James F. O'Neill (Republican) 40.7%
Michigan 18	William Broomfield	Republican	1956	Incumbent re-elected.	▌ ✓ William Broomfield (Republican) 59.6%; ▌George J. Fulkerson (Democratic) 40.4%
Michigan at-large	None (new district)			New seat. Democratic gain.	▌ ✓ Neil Staebler (Democratic) 52.0%; ▌Alvin Morell Bentley (Republican) 47.9%; ▌Ralph W. Muncy (Socialist Labor) 0.2%

== Minnesota ==
Minnesota lost one seat at reapportionment, and the 7th saw the largest change, with its territory split between the existing 2nd and 6th districts.

District	Incumbent			Results	Candidates
District	Member	Party	First elected	Results	Candidates
Minnesota 1	Al Quie	Republican	1958	Incumbent re-elected.	▌ ✓ Al Quie (Republican) 57.5%; ▌George Shepherd (DFL) 42.5%
Minnesota 2	Ancher Nelsen	Republican	1958	Incumbent re-elected.	▌ ✓ Ancher Nelsen (Republican) 62.2%; ▌Conrad Hammar (DFL) 37.8%
Minnesota 3	Clark MacGregor	Republican	1960	Incumbent re-elected.	▌ ✓ Clark MacGregor (Republican) 60.2%; ▌Irving R. Keldsen (DFL) 39.8%
Minnesota 4	Joseph Karth	DFL	1958	Incumbent re-elected.	▌ ✓ Joseph Karth (DFL) 59.5%; ▌Harry Strong (Republican) 40.5%
Minnesota 5	Walter Judd	Republican	1942	Incumbent lost re-election. DFL gain.	▌ ✓ Donald M. Fraser (DFL) 51.7%; ▌Walter Judd (Republican) 48.0%; ▌Joseph Johnson (Socialist Workers) 0.3%
Minnesota 6	Fred Marshall	DFL	1948	Incumbent retired. DFL hold.	▌ ✓ Alec G. Olson (DFL) 50.1%; ▌Robert J. Odegard (Republican) 49.9%
Minnesota 6	H. Carl Andersen; Redistricted from the 7th district	Republican	1938	Incumbent lost renomination. Republican loss.	▌ ✓ Alec G. Olson (DFL) 50.1%; ▌Robert J. Odegard (Republican) 49.9%
Minnesota 7	Odin Langen; Redistricted from the 9th district	Republican	1958	Incumbent re-elected.	▌ ✓ Odin Langen (Republican) 52.0%; ▌Harding C. Noblitt (DFL) 48.0%
Minnesota 8	John Blatnik	DFL	1946	Incumbent re-elected.	▌ ✓ John Blatnik (DFL) 65.7%; ▌Jerry H. Ketola (Republican) 34.3%

== Mississippi ==
Mississippi lost one seat at reapportionment, and merged the 2nd and 3rd districts without making other boundary changes.

District	Incumbent			Results	Candidates
District	Member	Party	First elected	Results	Candidates
Mississippi 1	Thomas Abernethy	Democratic	1942	Incumbent re-elected.	▌ ✓ Thomas Abernethy (Democratic); Unopposed
Mississippi 2	Jamie Whitten	Democratic	1941 (special)	Incumbent re-elected.	▌ ✓ Jamie Whitten (Democratic); Unopposed
Mississippi 2	Frank Ellis Smith; Redistricted from the 3rd district	Democratic	1950	Incumbent lost renomination. Democratic loss.	▌ ✓ Jamie Whitten (Democratic); Unopposed
Mississippi 3	John Bell Williams; Redistricted from the 4th district	Democratic	1946	Incumbent re-elected.	▌ ✓ John Bell Williams (Democratic); Unopposed
Mississippi 4	W. Arthur Winstead; Redistricted from the 5th district	Democratic	1942	Incumbent re-elected.	▌ ✓ W. Arthur Winstead (Democratic) 83.0%; ▌Sterling P. Davis Jr. (Independent) 17.0%
Mississippi 5	William M. Colmer; Redistricted from the 6th district	Democratic	1932	Incumbent re-elected.	▌ ✓ William M. Colmer (Democratic); Unopposed

== Missouri ==
Missouri lost one seat at reapportionment, and merged the 11th and 8th districts with compensating boundary changes to other districts.

District	Incumbent			Results	Candidates
District	Member	Party	First elected	Results	Candidates
Missouri 1	Frank M. Karsten	Democratic	1946	Incumbent re-elected.	▌ ✓ Frank M. Karsten (Democratic) 70.7%; ▌Charles F. Cherry (Republican) 29.3%
Missouri 2	Thomas B. Curtis	Republican	1950	Incumbent re-elected.	▌ ✓ Thomas B. Curtis (Republican) 56.3%; ▌Philip V. Maher (Democratic) 43.7%
Missouri 3	Leonor Sullivan	Democratic	1952	Incumbent re-elected.	▌ ✓ Leonor Sullivan (Democratic) 70.5%; ▌J. Marvin Krause (Republican) 29.5%
Missouri 4	William J. Randall	Democratic	1959 (special)	Incumbent re-elected.	▌ ✓ William J. Randall (Democratic) 53.9%; ▌John D. Fox (Republican) 46.1%
Missouri 5	Richard W. Bolling	Democratic	1948	Incumbent re-elected.	▌ ✓ Richard W. Bolling (Democratic) 58.9%; ▌Walter McCarty (Republican) 41.1%
Missouri 6	William R. Hull Jr.	Democratic	1954	Incumbent re-elected.	▌ ✓ William R. Hull Jr. (Democratic) 55.3%; ▌Ethan H. Campbell (Republican) 44.7%
Missouri 7	Durward G. Hall	Republican	1960	Incumbent re-elected.	▌ ✓ Durward G. Hall (Republican) 57.7%; ▌Jim Thomas (Democratic) 42.3%
Missouri 8	Richard H. Ichord Jr.	Democratic	1960	Incumbent re-elected.	▌ ✓ Richard H. Ichord Jr. (Democratic) 59.0%; ▌David W. Bernhardt (Republican) 41.0%
Missouri 8	Morgan M. Moulder; Redistricted from the 11th district	Democratic	1948	Incumbent retired. Democratic loss.	▌ ✓ Richard H. Ichord Jr. (Democratic) 59.0%; ▌David W. Bernhardt (Republican) 41.0%
Missouri 9	Clarence Cannon	Democratic	1922	Incumbent re-elected.	▌ ✓ Clarence Cannon (Democratic) 60.5%; ▌Anthony C. Schroeder (Republican) 39.5%
Missouri 10	Paul C. Jones	Democratic	1948	Incumbent re-elected.	▌ ✓ Paul C. Jones (Democratic) 60.6%; ▌Truman Farrow (Republican) 39.4%

== Montana ==
District	Incumbent			Results	Candidates
District	Member	Party	First elected	Results	Candidates
Montana 1	Arnold Olsen	Democratic	1960	Incumbent re-elected.	▌ ✓ Arnold Olsen (Democratic) 52.8%; ▌Wayne Montgomery (Republican) 47.2%
Montana 2	James F. Battin	Republican	1960	Incumbent re-elected.	▌ ✓ James F. Battin (Republican) 55.4%; ▌Leo Graybill Jr. (Democratic) 44.6%

== Nebraska ==
Nebraska lost one seat at reapportionment and split the southern 1st district between the eastern 3rd and western 4th districts.

District	Incumbent			Results	Candidates
District	Member	Party	First elected	Results	Candidates
Nebraska 1	Phil Weaver	Republican	1954	Incumbent lost renomination. Republican loss.	▌ ✓ Ralph F. Beermann (Republican) 50.3%; ▌Clair A. Callan (Democratic) 44.4%; ▌George C. Menkens (write-in) 5.3%
Nebraska 1	Ralph F. Beermann; Redistricted from the 3rd district	Republican	1960	Incumbent re-elected.	▌ ✓ Ralph F. Beermann (Republican) 50.3%; ▌Clair A. Callan (Democratic) 44.4%; ▌George C. Menkens (write-in) 5.3%
Nebraska 2	Glenn Cunningham	Republican	1956	Incumbent re-elected.	▌ ✓ Glenn Cunningham (Republican) 69.4%; ▌Thomas N. Bonner (Democratic) 30.6%
Nebraska 3	David Martin; Redistricted from the 4th district	Republican	1960	Incumbent re-elected.	▌ ✓ David Martin (Republican) 65.6%; ▌John A. Hoffman (Democratic) 34.4%

== Nevada ==
District	Incumbent			Results	Candidates
District	Member	Party	First elected	Results	Candidates
Nevada at-large	Walter S. Baring Jr.	Democratic	1948; 1952 (lost); 1956	Incumbent re-elected.	▌ ✓ Walter S. Baring Jr. (Democratic) 71.6%; ▌Carlton J. Adair (Republican) 28.4%

== New Hampshire ==
District	Incumbent			Results	Candidates
District	Member	Party	First elected	Results	Candidates
New Hampshire 1	Chester E. Merrow	Republican	1942	Incumbent retired to run for U.S. senator. Republican hold.	▌ ✓ Louis C. Wyman (Republican) 53.1%; ▌J. Oliva Huot (Democratic) 46.9%
New Hampshire 2	Perkins Bass	Republican	1954	Incumbent retired to run for U.S. senator. Republican hold.	▌ ✓ James Colgate Cleveland (Republican) 57.5%; ▌Eugene S. Daniell (Democratic) 42.5%

== New Jersey ==
New Jersey gained one seat and formed a 15th district out of parts of the existing 3rd and 5th districts around Perth Amboy without making substantial changes elsewhere.

District	Incumbent			Results	Candidates
District	Member	Party	First elected	Results	Candidates
New Jersey 1	William T. Cahill	Republican	1958	Incumbent re-elected.	▌ ✓ William T. Cahill (Republican) 58.8%; ▌Neil F. Deighan (Democratic) 41.0%; ▌Albert Ronis (Socialist Labor) 0.2%
New Jersey 2	Milton W. Glenn	Republican	1957 (special)	Incumbent re-elected.	▌ ✓ Milton W. Glenn (Republican) 52.7%; ▌Paul R. Porreca (Democratic) 46.7%; ▌Elvin Baker (Socialist Labor) 0.5%
New Jersey 3	James C. Auchincloss	Republican	1942	Incumbent re-elected.	▌ ✓ James C. Auchincloss (Republican) 56.9%; ▌Peter J. Gannon (Democratic) 43.1%
New Jersey 4	Frank Thompson	Democratic	1954	Incumbent re-elected.	▌ ✓ Frank Thompson (Democratic) 63.8%; ▌Ephraim Tomlinson II (Republican) 35.9%; ▌Bernardo S. Doganiero (Socialist Labor) 0.3%
New Jersey 5	Peter Frelinghuysen Jr.	Republican	1952	Incumbent re-elected.	▌ ✓ Peter Frelinghuysen Jr. (Republican) 66.0%; ▌Eugene M. Friedman (Democratic) 33.2%; ▌Frank Consalvo (Conservative) 0.8%
New Jersey 6	Florence P. Dwyer	Republican	1956	Incumbent re-elected.	▌ ✓ Florence P. Dwyer (Republican) 59.6%; ▌Lillian W. Egolf (Democratic) 39.8%; ▌John H. Wisner Jr. (Conservative) 0.6%
New Jersey 7	William B. Widnall	Republican	1950	Incumbent re-elected.	▌ ✓ William B. Widnall (Republican) 61.4%; ▌J. Emmet Cassidy (Democratic) 37.8%; ▌Robert A. Kretzer (Conservative) 0.5%; ▌James McKinley (Independent) 0.3%
New Jersey 8	Charles S. Joelson	Democratic	1960	Incumbent re-elected.	▌ ✓ Charles S. Joelson (Democratic) 65.0%; ▌Walter W. Porter Jr. (Republican) 34.2%; ▌Harry Santhouse (Socialist Labor) 0.4%; ▌Charles R. Checkley (Conservative) 0.4%
New Jersey 9	Frank C. Osmers Jr.	Republican	1938; 1942 (retired); 1951 (special)	Incumbent re-elected.	▌ ✓ Frank C. Osmers Jr. (Republican) 56.9%; ▌Donald R. Sorkow (Democratic) 42.2%; ▌Arthur A. Wacker (Conservative) 0.6%; ▌Nathan Karp (Socialist Labor) 0.3%
New Jersey 10	Peter W. Rodino	Democratic	1948	Incumbent re-elected.	▌ ✓ Peter W. Rodino (Democratic) 72.8%; ▌Charles A. Baretski (Republican) 26.5%; ▌Frank J. DeGeorge (Conservative) 0.5%; ▌William Kirkland (Independent) 0.3%
New Jersey 11	Hugh J. Addonizio	Democratic	1948	Incumbent resigned June 30, 1962 to run for Mayor of Newark. Democratic hold.	▌ ✓ Joseph Minish (Democratic) 59.5%; ▌Frank A. Palmieri (Republican) 37.4%; ▌Samuel Voltaggio (Independent) 2.6%; ▌Marjorie H. Schwester (Conservative) 0.5%
New Jersey 12	George M. Wallhauser	Republican	1958	Incumbent re-elected.	▌ ✓ George M. Wallhauser (Republican) 52.5%; ▌Robert R. Peacock (Democratic) 46.6%; ▌Harrison P. Smith Jr. (Conservative) 0.5%; ▌Harry Press (Socialist Labor) 0.2%; ▌Ruth F. Shiminsky (Socialist Workers) 0.1%
New Jersey 13	Neil Gallagher	Democratic	1958	Incumbent re-elected.	▌ ✓ Neil Gallagher (Democratic) 77.0%; ▌Eugene P. Kenny (Republican) 21.0%; ▌Thomas Quinn (Independent) 2.0%
New Jersey 14	Dominick V. Daniels	Democratic	1958	Incumbent re-elected.	▌ ✓ Dominick V. Daniels (Democratic) 70.6%; ▌Michael J. Bell (Republican) 27.8%; ▌Kenneth Walsh (Conservative) 1.6%
New Jersey 15	None (new district)			New seat. Democratic gain.	▌ ✓ Edward J. Patten (Democratic) 56.7%; ▌Bernard F. Rodgers (Republican) 43.3%

== New Mexico ==
District	Incumbent			Results	Candidates
District	Member	Party	First elected	Results	Candidates
New Mexico at-large	Joseph Montoya	Democratic	1957 (special)	Incumbent re-elected.	▌ ✓ Thomas G. Morris (Democratic) 31.7%; ▌ ✓ Joseph Montoya (Democratic) 26.7%; ▌Jack C. Redman (Republican) 24.1%; ▌Junio Lopez (Republican) 17.5%
New Mexico at-large	Thomas G. Morris	Democratic	1958	Incumbent re-elected.	▌ ✓ Thomas G. Morris (Democratic) 31.7%; ▌ ✓ Joseph Montoya (Democratic) 26.7%; ▌Jack C. Redman (Republican) 24.1%; ▌Junio Lopez (Republican) 17.5%

== New York ==
New York lost 2 seats at reapportionment; after redistricting, Long Island actually gained two seats while Manhattan lost two and Brooklyn and Upstate New York lost one each. As of 2020, this would be the last time Republicans would win the most congressional districts in New York.

District	Incumbent			Results	Candidates
District	Member	Party	First elected	Results	Candidates
New York 1	Otis G. Pike	Democratic	1960	Incumbent re-elected.	▌ ✓ Otis G. Pike (Democratic) 61.7%; ▌Walter M. Ormsby (Republican) 38.3%
New York 2	None (new district)			New seat. Republican gain.	▌ ✓ James R. Grover Jr. (Republican) 55.7%; ▌Robert J. Flynn (Democratic) 44.3%
New York 3	Steven Derounian; Redistricted from the 2nd district	Republican	1952	Incumbent re-elected.	▌ ✓ Steven Derounian (Republican) 59.2%; ▌George Soll (Democratic) 40.8%
New York 4	None (new district)			New seat. Republican gain.	▌ ✓ John W. Wydler (Republican) 56.4%; ▌Joseph A. Daley (Democratic) 42.7%; ▌Harry H. Purvis (Independent) 0.9%
New York 5	Frank J. Becker; Redistricted from the 3rd district	Republican	1952	Incumbent re-elected.	▌ ✓ Frank J. Becker (Republican) 57.5%; ▌Franklin Bear (Democratic) 42.5%
New York 6	Seymour Halpern; Redistricted from the 4th district	Republican	1958	Incumbent re-elected.	▌ ✓ Seymour Halpern (Republican) 63.3%; ▌Leonard L. Finz (Democratic) 36.7%
New York 7	Joseph P. Addabbo; Redistricted from the 5th district	Democratic	1960	Incumbent re-elected.	▌ ✓ Joseph P. Addabbo (Democratic) 59.3%; ▌George Archinal (Republican) 40.7%
New York 8	Benjamin Rosenthal; Redistricted from the 6th district	Democratic	1962 (special)	Incumbent re-elected.	▌ ✓ Benjamin Rosenthal (Democratic) 66.4%; ▌Arthur McCrossen (Republican) 33.6%
New York 9	James J. Delaney; Redistricted from the 7th district	Democratic	1944; 1946 (lost); 1948	Incumbent re-elected.	▌ ✓ James J. Delaney (Democratic) 58.7%; ▌Charles H. Cohen (Republican) 35.1%; ▌Mark Starr (Liberal) 6.2%
New York 10	Emanuel Celler; Redistricted from the 11th district	Democratic	1922	Incumbent re-elected.	▌ ✓ Emanuel Celler (Democratic) 81.0%; ▌Seymour Besunder (Republican) 19.0%
New York 11	Eugene Keogh; Redistricted from the 9th district	Democratic	1936	Incumbent re-elected.	▌ ✓ Eugene Keogh (Democratic) 71.6%; ▌Abraham L. Banner (Republican) 28.4%
New York 12	Edna F. Kelly; Redistricted from the 10th district	Democratic	1949 (special)	Incumbent re-elected.	▌ ✓ Edna F. Kelly (Democratic) 70.0%; ▌Louis London Goldberg (Republican) 30.0%
New York 13	Abraham J. Multer	Democratic	1947 (special)	Incumbent re-elected.	▌ ✓ Abraham J. Multer (Democratic) 74.6%; ▌Melvyn M. Rothman (Republican) 25.4%
New York 14	John J. Rooney	Democratic	1944	Incumbent re-elected.	▌ ✓ John J. Rooney (Democratic) 70.9%; ▌Leon F. Nadrowski (Republican) 29.1%
New York 14	Victor Anfuso; Redistricted from the 8th district	Democratic	1954	Incumbent retired to run for New York Supreme Court. Democratic loss.	▌ ✓ John J. Rooney (Democratic) 70.9%; ▌Leon F. Nadrowski (Republican) 29.1%
New York 15	Hugh Carey; Redistricted from the 12th district	Democratic	1960	Incumbent re-elected.	▌ ✓ Hugh Carey (Democratic) 50.2%; ▌Francis E. Dorn (Republican) 49.8%
New York 16	John H. Ray; Redistricted from the 15th district	Republican	1952	Incumbent retired. Democratic gain.	▌ ✓ John M. Murphy (Democratic) 47.5%; ▌Robert T. Connor (Republican) 45.9%; ▌George B. Murphy (Liberal) 6.6%
New York 17	John Lindsay	Republican	1958	Incumbent re-elected.	▌ ✓ John Lindsay (Republican) 68.7%; ▌Martin B. Dworkis (Democratic) 31.3%
New York 18	Adam Clayton Powell Jr. Redistricted from the 16th district	Democratic	1944	Incumbent re-elected.	▌ ✓ Adam Clayton Powell Jr. (Democratic) 69.6%; ▌Ramon A. Martinez (Republican) 21.6%; ▌Mae P. Watts (Liberal) 8.8%
New York 19	Leonard Farbstein	Democratic	1956	Incumbent re-elected.	▌ ✓ Leonard Farbstein (Democratic) 58.5%; ▌Richard S. Aldrich (Republican) 30.5%; ▌Bentley Kassal (Liberal) 11.0%
New York 20	William Fitts Ryan	Democratic	1960	Incumbent re-elected.	▌ ✓ William Fitts Ryan (Democratic) 72.6%; ▌Gilbert A. Robinson (Republican) 27.4%
New York 20	Herbert Zelenko; Redistricted from the 21st district	Democratic	1954	Incumbent lost renomination. Democratic loss.	▌ ✓ William Fitts Ryan (Democratic) 72.6%; ▌Gilbert A. Robinson (Republican) 27.4%
New York 21	James C. Healey; Redistricted from the 22nd district	Democratic	1956	Incumbent re-elected.	▌ ✓ James C. Healey (Democratic) 67.4%; ▌Stanley L. Slater (Republican) 21.0%; ▌Lillian Gulker (Liberal) 11.6%
New York 22	Jacob H. Gilbert; Redistricted from the 23rd district	Democratic	1960	Incumbent re-elected.	▌ ✓ Jacob H. Gilbert (Democratic) 70.4%; ▌Oscar Gonzalez-Suarez (Republican) 20.5%; ▌David Grand (Liberal) 9.1%
New York 23	Charles A. Buckley; Redistricted from the 24th district	Democratic	1934	Incumbent re-elected.	▌ ✓ Charles A. Buckley (Democratic) 54.4%; ▌John J. Parker (Republican) 30.9%; ▌John P. Hagan (Liberal) 14.6%
New York 24	Paul A. Fino; Redistricted from the 25th district	Republican	1952	Incumbent re-elected.	▌ ✓ Paul A. Fino (Republican) 60.1%; ▌Alfred E. Santangelo (Democratic) 35.9%; ▌Frank Leff (Liberal) 4.0%
New York 24	Alfred E. Santangelo; Redistricted from the 18th district	Democratic	1956	Incumbent lost re-election. Democratic loss.	▌ ✓ Paul A. Fino (Republican) 60.1%; ▌Alfred E. Santangelo (Democratic) 35.9%; ▌Frank Leff (Liberal) 4.0%
New York 25	Robert R. Barry; Redistricted from the 27th district	Republican	1958	Incumbent re-elected.	▌ ✓ Robert R. Barry (Republican) 61.5%; ▌A. Frank Reel (Democratic) 38.5%
New York 26	Edwin B. Dooley	Republican	1956	Incumbent lost renomination. Republican hold.	▌ ✓ Ogden Reid (Republican) 60.9%; ▌Stanley W. Church (Democratic) 39.1%
New York 27	Katharine St. George; Redistricted from the 28th district	Republican	1946	Incumbent re-elected.	▌ ✓ Katharine St. George (Republican) 57.9%; ▌William F. Ward Jr. (Democratic) 42.1%
New York 28	J. Ernest Wharton; Redistricted from the 29th district	Republican	1950	Incumbent re-elected.	▌ ✓ J. Ernest Wharton (Republican) 64.1%; ▌Morton E. Gilday (Democratic) 35.9%
New York 29	Leo W. O'Brien; Redistricted from the 30th district	Democratic	1952	Incumbent re-elected.	▌ ✓ Leo W. O'Brien (Democratic) 60.1%; ▌Wolfgang J. Riemer (Republican) 39.9%
New York 30	Carleton J. King; Redistricted from the 31st district	Republican	1960	Incumbent re-elected.	▌ ✓ Carleton J. King (Republican) 63.7%; ▌William W. Egan (Democratic) 33.9%; ▌Harold T. Smith (Liberal) 2.4%
New York 31	Clarence E. Kilburn; Redistricted from the 33rd district	Republican	1940	Incumbent re-elected.	▌ ✓ Clarence E. Kilburn (Republican) 60.0%; ▌Francis G. Healey (Democratic) 40.0%
New York 32	Alexander Pirnie; Redistricted from the 34th district	Republican	1958	Incumbent re-elected.	▌ ✓ Alexander Pirnie (Republican) 57.6%; ▌Virgil C. Crisafulli (Democratic) 42.4%
New York 33	Howard W. Robison; Redistricted from the 37th district	Republican	1958	Incumbent re-elected.	▌ ✓ Howard W. Robison (Republican) 66.8%; ▌Theodore W. Maurer (Democratic) 29.9%; ▌Harrop Freeman (Liberal) 3.3%
New York 34	R. Walter Riehlman; Redistricted from the 35th district	Republican	1946	Incumbent re-elected.	▌ ✓ R. Walter Riehlman (Republican) 54.8%; ▌Lee Alexander (Democratic) 43.4%; ▌John Arneson (Liberal) 1.8%
New York 35	Samuel S. Stratton; Redistricted from the 32nd district	Democratic	1958	Incumbent re-elected.	▌ ✓ Samuel S. Stratton (Democratic) 54.5%; ▌Janet Hill Gordon (Republican) 45.5%
New York 35	John Taber; Redistricted from the 36th district	Republican	1922	Incumbent retired. Republican loss.	▌ ✓ Samuel S. Stratton (Democratic) 54.5%; ▌Janet Hill Gordon (Republican) 45.5%
New York 36	Jessica M. Weis; Redistricted from the 38th district	Republican	1958	Incumbent retired. Republican hold.	▌ ✓ Frank Horton (Republican) 59.3%; ▌Arthur B. Curran Jr. (Democratic) 40.7%
New York 37	Harold C. Ostertag; Redistricted from the 39th district	Republican	1950	Incumbent re-elected.	▌ ✓ Harold C. Ostertag (Republican) 64.3%; ▌Norman C. Katner (Democratic) 35.7%
New York 38	Charles Goodell; Redistricted from the 43rd district	Republican	1959 (special)	Incumbent re-elected.	▌ ✓ Charles Goodell (Republican) 68.3%; ▌T. Joseph Lynch (Democratic) 30.3%; ▌Leo M. Brushingham (Liberal) 1.3%
New York 39	John R. Pillion; Redistricted from the 42nd district	Republican	1952	Incumbent re-elected.	▌ ✓ John R. Pillion (Republican) 62.6%; ▌Angelo S. D'Eloia (Democratic) 35.1%; ▌Walter Bratek (Liberal) 2.3%
New York 40	William E. Miller	Republican	1950	Incumbent re-elected.	▌ ✓ William E. Miller (Republican) 52.0%; ▌E. Dent Lackey (Democratic) 48.0%
New York 41	Thaddeus J. Dulski	Democratic	1958	Incumbent re-elected.	▌ ✓ Thaddeus J. Dulski (Democratic) 71.5%; ▌Daniel J. Kij (Republican) 28.5%

== North Carolina ==
District	Incumbent			Results	Candidates
District	Member	Party	First elected	Results	Candidates
North Carolina 1	Herbert Covington Bonner	Democratic	1940	Incumbent re-elected.	▌ ✓ Herbert Covington Bonner (Democratic); Unopposed
North Carolina 2	Lawrence H. Fountain	Democratic	1952	Incumbent re-elected.	▌ ✓ Lawrence H. Fountain (Democratic); Unopposed
North Carolina 3	David N. Henderson	Democratic	1960	Incumbent re-elected.	▌ ✓ David N. Henderson (Democratic); Unopposed
North Carolina 4	Harold D. Cooley	Democratic	1934	Incumbent re-elected.	▌ ✓ Harold D. Cooley (Democratic) 58.1%; ▌George E. Ward (Republican) 41.9%
North Carolina 5	Ralph James Scott	Democratic	1956	Incumbent re-elected.	▌ ✓ Ralph James Scott (Democratic) 59.2%; ▌A. M. Snipes (Republican) 40.8%
North Carolina 6	Horace R. Kornegay	Democratic	1960	Incumbent re-elected.	▌ ✓ Horace R. Kornegay (Democratic) 59.9%; ▌Blackwell P. Robinson (Republican) 40.1%
North Carolina 7	Alton Lennon	Democratic	1956	Incumbent re-elected.	▌ ✓ Alton Lennon (Democratic) 77.0%; ▌James E. Walsh Jr. (Republican) 23.0%
North Carolina 8	Alvin Paul Kitchin	Democratic	1956	Incumbent lost re-election. Democratic loss.	▌ ✓ Charles R. Jonas (Republican) 56.0%; ▌Alvin Paul Kitchin (Democratic) 44.0%
North Carolina 8	Charles R. Jonas; Redistricted from the 10th district	Republican	1952	Incumbent re-elected.	▌ ✓ Charles R. Jonas (Republican) 56.0%; ▌Alvin Paul Kitchin (Democratic) 44.0%
North Carolina 9	Hugh Quincy Alexander	Democratic	1952	Incumbent lost re-election. Republican gain.	▌ ✓ Jim Broyhill (Republican) 50.5%; ▌Hugh Quincy Alexander (Democratic) 49.5%
North Carolina 10	Basil Whitener; Redistricted from the 11th district	Democratic	1956	Incumbent re-elected.	▌ ✓ Basil Whitener (Democratic) 55.1%; ▌Carrol M. Barringer (Republican) 44.9%
North Carolina 11	Roy A. Taylor; Redistricted from the 12th district	Democratic	1960	Incumbent re-elected.	▌ ✓ Roy A. Taylor (Democratic) 55.2%; ▌Robert Brown (Republican) 44.8%

== North Dakota ==
District	Incumbent			Results	Candidates
District	Member	Party	First elected	Results	Candidates
North Dakota 1	Hjalmar Nygaard; Redistricted from the at-large district	Republican	1960	Incumbent re-elected.	▌ ✓ Hjalmar Nygaard (Republican) 54.6%; ▌Scott Anderson (Democratic-NPL) 45.4%
North Dakota 2	Don L. Short; Redistricted from the at-large district	Republican	1958	Incumbent re-elected.	▌ ✓ Don L. Short (Republican) 54.0%; ▌Robert Vogel (Democratic-NPL) 46.0%

== Ohio ==
District	Incumbent			Results	Candidates
District	Member	Party	First elected	Results	Candidates
Ohio 1	Gordon H. Scherer	Republican	1952	Incumbent retired. Republican hold.	▌ ✓ Carl West Rich (Republican) 62.7%; ▌Monica Nolan (Democratic) 37.3%
Ohio 2	Donald D. Clancy	Republican	1960	Incumbent re-elected.	▌ ✓ Donald D. Clancy (Republican) 62.8%; ▌H. A. Sand (Democratic) 37.2%
Ohio 3	Paul F. Schenck	Republican	1951 (special)	Incumbent re-elected.	▌ ✓ Paul F. Schenck (Republican) 57.0%; ▌Martin A. Evers (Democratic) 43.0%
Ohio 4	William M. McCulloch	Republican	1947 (special)	Incumbent re-elected.	▌ ✓ William M. McCulloch (Republican) 70.3%; ▌Marjorie Conrad Struna (Democratic) 29.7%
Ohio 5	Del Latta	Republican	1958	Incumbent re-elected.	▌ ✓ Del Latta (Republican) 70.4%; ▌William T. Hunt (Democratic) 29.6%
Ohio 6	Bill Harsha	Republican	1960	Incumbent re-elected.	▌ ✓ Bill Harsha (Republican) 60.4%; ▌Jerry C. Rasor (Democratic) 39.6%
Ohio 7	Clarence J. Brown	Republican	1938	Incumbent re-elected.	▌ ✓ Clarence J. Brown (Republican) 67.7%; ▌Robert A. Riley (Democratic) 32.3%
Ohio 8	Jackson Edward Betts	Republican	1950	Incumbent re-elected.	▌ ✓ Jackson Edward Betts (Republican) 70.1%; ▌Morris Laderman (Democratic) 29.9%
Ohio 9	Thomas L. Ashley	Democratic	1954	Incumbent re-elected.	▌ ✓ Thomas L. Ashley (Democratic) 57.4%; ▌Martin A. Janis (Republican) 42.6%
Ohio 10	Walter H. Moeller	Democratic	1958	Incumbent lost re-election. Republican gain.	▌ ✓ Pete Abele (Republican) 52.3%; ▌Walter H. Moeller (Democratic) 47.7%
Ohio 11	Robert E. Cook	Democratic	1958	Incumbent lost re-election. Republican gain.	▌ ✓ Oliver P. Bolton (Republican) 50.6%; ▌Robert E. Cook (Democratic) 49.4%
Ohio 12	Samuel L. Devine	Republican	1958	Incumbent re-elected.	▌ ✓ Samuel L. Devine (Republican) 68.3%; ▌Paul D. Cassidy (Democratic) 31.7%
Ohio 13	Charles Adams Mosher	Republican	1960	Incumbent re-elected.	▌ ✓ Charles Adams Mosher (Republican) 55.1%; ▌J. Grant Keys (Democratic) 44.9%
Ohio 14	William Hanes Ayres	Republican	1950	Incumbent re-elected.	▌ ✓ William Hanes Ayres (Republican) 53.7%; ▌Oliver Ocasek (Democratic) 46.3%
Ohio 15	Tom Van Horn Moorehead	Republican	1960	Incumbent lost re-election. Democratic gain.	▌ ✓ Robert T. Secrest (Democratic) 52.4%; ▌Tom Van Horn Moorehead (Republican) 47.6%
Ohio 16	Frank T. Bow	Republican	1950	Incumbent re-elected.	▌ ✓ Frank T. Bow (Republican) 60.0%; ▌Ed Witmer (Democratic) 40.0%
Ohio 17	John M. Ashbrook	Republican	1960	Incumbent re-elected.	▌ ✓ John M. Ashbrook (Republican) 58.6%; ▌Robert W. Levering (Democratic) 41.4%
Ohio 18	Wayne Hays	Democratic	1948	Incumbent re-elected.	▌ ✓ Wayne Hays (Democratic) 61.0%; ▌John J. Carigg (Republican) 39.0%
Ohio 19	Michael J. Kirwan	Democratic	1936	Incumbent re-elected.	▌ ✓ Michael J. Kirwan (Democratic) 62.2%; ▌William Vincent Williams (Republican) 37.8%
Ohio 20	Michael A. Feighan	Democratic	1942	Incumbent re-elected.	▌ ✓ Michael A. Feighan (Democratic) 71.0%; ▌Leonard G. Richter (Republican) 29.0%
Ohio 21	Charles Vanik	Democratic	1954	Incumbent re-elected.	▌ ✓ Charles Vanik (Democratic) 79.9%; ▌Leodis Harris (Republican) 20.1%
Ohio 22	Frances P. Bolton	Republican	1940	Incumbent re-elected.	▌ ✓ Frances P. Bolton (Republican) 64.6%; ▌Edward Corrigan (Democratic) 30.6%; ▌Ronald B. Peltz (Independent) 4.8%
Ohio 23	William Edwin Minshall Jr.	Republican	1954	Incumbent re-elected.	▌ ✓ William Edwin Minshall Jr. (Republican) 71.5%; ▌Emil C. Weber (Democratic) 28.5%
Ohio at-large	None (new district)			New seat. Republican gain.	▌ ✓ Robert Taft Jr. (Republican) 60.5%; ▌Richard D. Kennedy (Democratic) 39.5%

== Oklahoma ==
District	Incumbent			Results	Candidates
District	Member	Party	First elected	Results	Candidates
Oklahoma 1	Page Belcher	Republican	1950	Incumbent re-elected.	▌ ✓ Page Belcher (Republican) 68.6%; ▌Herbert W. Wright Jr. (Democratic) 31.4%
Oklahoma 2	Ed Edmondson	Democratic	1952	Incumbent re-elected.	▌ ✓ Ed Edmondson (Democratic) 56.6%; ▌Bill Sharp (Republican) 43.4%
Oklahoma 3	Carl Albert	Democratic	1946	Incumbent re-elected.	▌ ✓ Carl Albert (Democratic); Unopposed
Oklahoma 4	Tom Steed	Democratic	1948	Incumbent re-elected.	▌ ✓ Tom Steed (Democratic); Unopposed
Oklahoma 5	John Jarman	Democratic	1950	Incumbent re-elected.	▌ ✓ John Jarman (Democratic) 68.9%; ▌William P. Pointon Jr. (Republican) 31.1%
Oklahoma 6	Victor Wickersham	Democratic	1960	Incumbent re-elected.	▌ ✓ Victor Wickersham (Democratic) 53.5%; ▌Glenn L. Gibson (Republican) 46.5%

== Oregon ==
District	Incumbent			Results	Candidates
District	Member	Party	First elected	Results	Candidates
Oregon 1	A. Walter Norblad	Republican	1946	Incumbent re-elected.	▌ ✓ A. Walter Norblad (Republican) 61.8%; ▌R. Blaine Whipple (Democratic) 38.2%
Oregon 2	Al Ullman	Democratic	1956	Incumbent re-elected.	▌ ✓ Al Ullman (Democratic) 64.0%; ▌Robert W. Chandler (Republican) 36.0%
Oregon 3	Edith Green	Democratic	1954	Incumbent re-elected.	▌ ✓ Edith Green (Democratic) 66.0%; ▌Stanley E. Hartman (Republican) 34.0%
Oregon 4	Edwin Durno	Republican	1960	Incumbent retired to run for U.S. senator. Democratic gain.	▌ ✓ Robert B. Duncan (Democratic) 53.9%; ▌Carl Fisher (Republican) 46.1%

== Pennsylvania ==
Three seats were lost in reapportionment, decreasing the delegation from 30 to 27 seats, with redistricting removing one seat in Philadelphia and two in central Pennsylvania. Two of those seats were lost by Republicans (a retirement and a redistricting contest against a Democratic incumbent), and one seat was by a Democrat (a retirement).

District	Incumbent			Results	Candidates
District	Member	Party	First elected	Results	Candidates
Pennsylvania 1	William A. Barrett	Democratic	1944; 1946 (lost); 1948	Incumbent re-elected.	▌ ✓ William A. Barrett (Democratic) 63.5%; ▌Winifred H. Malinowsky (Republican) 36.5%
Pennsylvania 2	Kathryn E. Granahan	Democratic	1956	Incumbent retired. Democratic loss.	▌ ✓ Robert N. C. Nix Sr. (Democratic) 67.1%; ▌Arthur Thomas (Republican) 32.9%
Pennsylvania 2	Robert N. C. Nix Sr. Redistricted from the 4th district	Democratic	1958	Incumbent re-elected.	▌ ✓ Robert N. C. Nix Sr. (Democratic) 67.1%; ▌Arthur Thomas (Republican) 32.9%
Pennsylvania 3	James A. Byrne	Democratic	1952	Incumbent re-elected.	▌ ✓ James A. Byrne (Democratic) 59.3%; ▌Joseph R. Burns (Republican) 40.7%
Pennsylvania 4	Herman Toll; Redistricted from the 6th district	Democratic	1958	Incumbent re-elected.	▌ ✓ Herman Toll (Democratic) 56.0%; ▌Frank J. Barbera (Republican) 44.0%
Pennsylvania 5	William J. Green Jr.	Democratic	1944	Incumbent re-elected.	▌ ✓ William J. Green Jr. (Democratic) 55.9%; ▌Michael J. Bednarek (Republican) 44.1%
Pennsylvania 6	George M. Rhodes; Redistricted from the 14th district	Democratic	1948	Incumbent re-elected.	▌ ✓ George M. Rhodes (Democratic) 51.2%; ▌Ivor D. Fenton (Republican) 48.8%
Pennsylvania 6	Ivor D. Fenton; Redistricted from the 12th district	Republican	1938	Incumbent lost re-election. Republican loss.	▌ ✓ George M. Rhodes (Democratic) 51.2%; ▌Ivor D. Fenton (Republican) 48.8%
Pennsylvania 7	William H. Milliken Jr.	Republican	1958	Incumbent re-elected.	▌ ✓ William H. Milliken Jr. (Republican) 60.8%; ▌John A. Reilly (Democratic) 39.2%
Pennsylvania 8	Willard S. Curtin	Republican	1956	Incumbent re-elected.	▌ ✓ Willard S. Curtin (Republican) 54.8%; ▌James A. Michener (Democratic) 45.2%
Pennsylvania 9	Paul B. Dague	Republican	1946	Incumbent re-elected.	▌ ✓ Paul B. Dague (Republican) 67.2%; ▌Richard C. Keller (Democratic) 32.8%
Pennsylvania 10	William Scranton	Republican	1960	Incumbent retired to run for Governor of Pennsylvania. Republican hold.	▌ ✓ Joseph M. McDade (Republican) 52.5%; ▌William D. Gombar (Democratic) 47.5%
Pennsylvania 11	Dan Flood	Democratic	1944; 1946 (lost); 1948; 1952 (lost); 1954	Incumbent re-elected.	▌ ✓ Dan Flood (Democratic) 66.5%; ▌Donald B. Ayers (Republican) 33.5%
Pennsylvania 12	J. Irving Whalley; Redistricted from the 18th district	Republican	1960	Incumbent re-elected.	▌ ✓ J. Irving Whalley (Republican) 60.5%; ▌A. Reed Hayes (Democratic) 39.5%
Pennsylvania 12	James E. Van Zandt; Redistricted from the 20th district	Republican	1946	Incumbent retired to run for U.S. senator. Republican loss.	▌ ✓ J. Irving Whalley (Republican) 60.5%; ▌A. Reed Hayes (Democratic) 39.5%
Pennsylvania 13	Richard Schweiker	Republican	1960	Incumbent re-elected.	▌ ✓ Richard Schweiker (Republican) 66.6%; ▌Lee F. Driscoll Jr. (Democratic) 33.4%
Pennsylvania 14	William S. Moorhead; Redistricted from the 28th district	Democratic	1958	Incumbent re-elected.	▌ ✓ William S. Moorhead (Democratic) 65.7%; ▌Joseph M. Beatty (Republican) 34.3%
Pennsylvania 15	Francis E. Walter	Democratic	1932	Incumbent re-elected.	▌ ✓ Francis E. Walter (Democratic) 57.5%; ▌Woodrow A. Horn (Republican) 42.5%
Pennsylvania 16	John C. Kunkel	Republican	1961 (special)	Incumbent re-elected.	▌ ✓ John C. Kunkel (Republican) 66.7%; ▌John A. Walter (Democratic) 33.3%
Pennsylvania 17	Herman T. Schneebeli	Republican	1960	Incumbent re-elected.	▌ ✓ Herman T. Schneebeli (Republican) 62.9%; ▌William W. Litke (Democratic) 37.1%
Pennsylvania 18	Robert J. Corbett; Redistricted from the 29th district	Republican	1938; 1940 (lost); 1944	Incumbent re-elected.	▌ ✓ Robert J. Corbett (Republican) 64.3%; ▌Edward F. Cook (Democratic) 35.7%
Pennsylvania 19	George A. Goodling	Republican	1960	Incumbent re-elected.	▌ ✓ George A. Goodling (Republican) 56.8%; ▌Earl D. Warner (Democratic) 43.2%
Pennsylvania 20	Elmer J. Holland; Redistricted from the 30th district	Democratic	1942 (special); 1942 (retired); 1956 (special)	Incumbent re-elected.	▌ ✓ Elmer J. Holland (Democratic) 67.4%; ▌Budd E. Sheppard (Republican) 32.6%
Pennsylvania 21	John Herman Dent	Democratic	1958	Incumbent re-elected.	▌ ✓ John Herman Dent (Democratic) 59.6%; ▌Charles E. Scalf (Republican) 40.4%
Pennsylvania 22	John P. Saylor	Republican	1949 (special)	Incumbent re-elected.	▌ ✓ John P. Saylor (Republican) 57.5%; ▌Donald J. Perry (Democratic) 42.5%
Pennsylvania 23	Leon H. Gavin	Republican	1942	Incumbent re-elected.	▌ ✓ Leon H. Gavin (Republican) 58.6%; ▌Frank M. O'Neil (Democratic) 40.6%; ▌Germain Schreffler (Prohibition) 0.8%
Pennsylvania 24	Carroll D. Kearns	Republican	1946	Incumbent lost renomination. Republican hold.	▌ ✓ James D. Weaver (Republican) 51.4%; ▌Peter J. Joyce (Democratic) 48.6%
Pennsylvania 25	Frank M. Clark	Democratic	1954	Incumbent re-elected.	▌ ✓ Frank M. Clark (Democratic) 56.4%; ▌Harvey R. Robinson (Republican) 43.6%
Pennsylvania 26	Thomas E. Morgan	Democratic	1944	Incumbent re-elected.	▌ ✓ Thomas E. Morgan (Democratic) 61.7%; ▌Jerome Hahn (Republican) 38.3%
Pennsylvania 27	James G. Fulton	Republican	1944	Incumbent re-elected.	▌ ✓ James G. Fulton (Republican) 65.5%; ▌Margaret L. Walgren (Democratic) 34.5%

== Rhode Island ==
District	Incumbent			Results	Candidates
District	Member	Party	First elected	Results	Candidates
Rhode Island 1	Fernand St Germain	Democratic	1960	Incumbent re-elected.	▌ ✓ Fernand St Germain (Democratic) 56.8%; ▌R. Gordon Butler (Republican) 43.2%
Rhode Island 2	John E. Fogarty	Democratic	1940	Incumbent re-elected.	▌ ✓ John E. Fogarty (Democratic) 71.8%; ▌John F. Kennedy (Republican) 28.2%

== South Carolina ==
District	Incumbent			Results	Candidates
District	Member	Party	First elected	Results	Candidates
South Carolina 1	L. Mendel Rivers	Democratic	1940	Incumbent re-elected.	▌ ✓ L. Mendel Rivers (Democratic); Unopposed
South Carolina 2	Corinne Boyd Riley	Democratic	1962 (special)	Incumbent retired. Democratic hold.	▌ ✓ Albert Watson (Democratic) 52.8%; ▌Floyd Spence (Republican) 47.2%
South Carolina 3	W. J. Bryan Dorn	Democratic	1946; 1948 (retired); 1950	Incumbent re-elected.	▌ ✓ W. J. Bryan Dorn (Democratic); Unopposed
South Carolina 4	Robert T. Ashmore	Democratic	1953 (special)	Incumbent re-elected.	▌ ✓ Robert T. Ashmore (Democratic); Unopposed
South Carolina 5	Robert W. Hemphill	Democratic	1956	Incumbent re-elected.	▌ ✓ Robert W. Hemphill (Democratic) 94.0%; ▌Robert M. Doster (Republican) 6.0%
South Carolina 6	John L. McMillan	Democratic	1938	Incumbent re-elected.	▌ ✓ John L. McMillan (Democratic); Unopposed

== South Dakota ==
District	Incumbent			Results	Candidates
District	Member	Party	First elected	Results	Candidates
South Dakota 1	Ben Reifel	Republican	1960	Incumbent re-elected.	▌ ✓ Ben Reifel (Republican) 59.2%; ▌Ralph A. Nauman (Democratic) 40.8%
South Dakota 2	E. Y. Berry	Republican	1950	Incumbent re-elected.	▌ ✓ E. Y. Berry (Republican) 61.5%; ▌M. W. Clarkson (Democratic) 38.5%

== Tennessee ==
District	Incumbent			Results	Candidates
District	Member	Party	First elected	Results	Candidates
Tennessee 1	Louise Goff Reece	Republican	1961 (special)	Incumbent retired. Republican hold.	▌ ✓ Jimmy Quillen (Republican) 53.9%; ▌Herbert R. Silvers (Democratic) 43.8%; ▌Arthur Bright (Independent) 2.3%
Tennessee 2	Howard Baker Sr.	Republican	1950	Incumbent re-elected.	▌ ✓ Howard Baker Sr. (Republican) 70.6%; ▌Tally R. Livingston (Democratic) 29.4%
Tennessee 3	James B. Frazier Jr.	Democratic	1948	Incumbent lost renomination. Republican gain.	▌ ✓ Bill Brock (Republican) 51.1%; ▌Wilkes Thrasher Jr. (Democratic) 48.9%
Tennessee 4	Joe L. Evins	Democratic	1946	Incumbent re-elected.	▌ ✓ Joe L. Evins (Democratic) 87.9%; ▌Arch M. Eaton (Ind Rep) 12.1%
Tennessee 5	J. Carlton Loser	Democratic	1956	Incumbent lost re-election. Democratic hold.	▌ ✓ Richard Fulton (Ind Dem) 60.4%; ▌J. Carlton Loser (Democratic) 38.2%; ▌Raymond E. Love (write-in) 0.6%; ▌H. L. Crowder (write-in) 0.5%; ▌H. J. Ryan (write-in) 0.3%
Tennessee 6	Ross Bass	Democratic	1954	Incumbent re-elected.	▌ ✓ Ross Bass (Democratic) 81.8%; ▌J. J. Underwood (Independent) 18.2%
Tennessee 7	Tom J. Murray	Democratic	1942	Incumbent re-elected.	▌ ✓ Tom J. Murray (Democratic); Unopposed
Tennessee 8	Fats Everett	Democratic	1958	Incumbent re-elected.	▌ ✓ Fats Everett (Democratic) 97.3%; ▌Sara Flannary (write-in) 2.7%
Tennessee 9	Clifford Davis	Democratic	1940	Incumbent re-elected.	▌ ✓ Clifford Davis (Democratic) 50.6%; ▌Robert B. James (Republican) 49.4%

== Texas ==
Texas gained one seat in reapportionment and elected it at large.

District	Incumbent			Results	Candidates
District	Member	Party	First elected	Results	Candidates
Texas 1	Wright Patman	Democratic	1928	Incumbent re-elected.	▌ ✓ Wright Patman (Democratic) 67.3%; ▌James Timberlake (Republican) 32.7%
Texas 2	Jack Brooks	Democratic	1952	Incumbent re-elected.	▌ ✓ Jack Brooks (Democratic) 68.7%; ▌Roy James Jr. (Republican) 31.3%
Texas 3	Lindley Beckworth	Democratic	1956	Incumbent re-elected.	▌ ✓ Lindley Beckworth (Democratic) 52.0%; ▌William Steger (Republican) 48.0%
Texas 4	Ray Roberts	Democratic	1962 (special)	Incumbent re-elected.	▌ ✓ Ray Roberts (Democratic) 72.0%; ▌Conner Harrington (Republican) 28.0%
Texas 5	Bruce Alger	Republican	1954	Incumbent re-elected.	▌ ✓ Bruce Alger (Republican) 56.3%; ▌Bill Jones (Democratic) 43.7%
Texas 6	Olin E. Teague	Democratic	1946	Incumbent re-elected.	▌ ✓ Olin E. Teague (Democratic); Unopposed
Texas 7	John Dowdy	Democratic	1952	Incumbent re-elected.	▌ ✓ John Dowdy (Democratic) 88.2%; ▌Raymond Ramage (Republican) 11.8%
Texas 8	Albert Thomas	Democratic	1936	Incumbent re-elected.	▌ ✓ Albert Thomas (Democratic) 71.5%; ▌Anthony J. P. Farris (Republican) 28.5%
Texas 9	Clark W. Thompson	Democratic	1947 (special)	Incumbent re-elected.	▌ ✓ Clark W. Thompson (Democratic) 66.3%; ▌Dave Oakes (Republican) 33.7%
Texas 10	Homer Thornberry	Democratic	1948	Incumbent re-elected.	▌ ✓ Homer Thornberry (Democratic) 63.3%; ▌Jim Dobbs (Republican) 36.7%
Texas 11	William R. Poage	Democratic	1936	Incumbent re-elected.	▌ ✓ William R. Poage (Democratic); Unopposed
Texas 12	Jim Wright	Democratic	1954	Incumbent re-elected.	▌ ✓ Jim Wright (Democratic) 60.6%; ▌Del Barron (Republican) 39.4%
Texas 13	Graham B. Purcell Jr.	Democratic	1962 (special)	Incumbent re-elected.	▌ ✓ Graham B. Purcell Jr. (Democratic) 67.1%; ▌Joe Meissner (Republican) 32.9%
Texas 14	John Andrew Young	Democratic	1956	Incumbent re-elected.	▌ ✓ John Andrew Young (Democratic) 70.4%; ▌Lawrence Hoover (Republican) 29.6%
Texas 15	Joe M. Kilgore	Democratic	1954	Incumbent re-elected.	▌ ✓ Joe M. Kilgore (Democratic); Unopposed
Texas 16	J. T. Rutherford	Democratic	1954	Incumbent lost re-election. Republican gain.	▌ ✓ Ed Foreman (Republican) 53.8%; ▌J. T. Rutherford (Democratic) 46.2%
Texas 17	Omar Burleson	Democratic	1946	Incumbent re-elected.	▌ ✓ Omar Burleson (Democratic); Unopposed
Texas 18	Walter E. Rogers	Democratic	1950	Incumbent re-elected.	▌ ✓ Walter E. Rogers (Democratic) 58.8%; ▌Jack Seale (Republican) 41.2%
Texas 19	George H. Mahon	Democratic	1934	Incumbent re-elected.	▌ ✓ George H. Mahon (Democratic) 67.1%; ▌Dennis Taylor (Republican) 32.9%
Texas 20	Henry B. González	Democratic	1961 (special)	Incumbent re-elected.	▌ ✓ Henry B. González (Democratic); Unopposed
Texas 21	O. C. Fisher	Democratic	1942	Incumbent re-elected.	▌ ✓ O. C. Fisher (Democratic) 76.1%; ▌E. S. Mayer (Republican) 23.9%
Texas 22	Robert R. Casey	Democratic	1958	Incumbent re-elected.	▌ ✓ Robert R. Casey (Democratic) 53.5%; ▌Ross Baker (Republican) 46.5%
Texas at-large	None (new district)			New seat. Democratic gain.	▌ ✓ Joe R. Pool (Democratic) 56.1%; ▌Desmond Barry (Republican) 43.9%

== Utah ==
District	Incumbent			Results	Candidates
District	Member	Party	First elected	Results	Candidates
Utah 1	M. Blaine Peterson	Democratic	1960	Incumbent lost re-election. Republican gain.	▌ ✓ Laurence J. Burton (Republican) 50.9%; ▌M. Blaine Peterson (Democratic) 49.1%
Utah 2	David S. King	Democratic	1958	Incumbent retired to run for U.S. senator. Republican gain.	▌ ✓ Sherman P. Lloyd (Republican) 53.9%; ▌Bruce S. Jenkins (Democratic) 46.1%

== Vermont ==
District	Incumbent			Results	Candidates
District	Member	Party	First elected	Results	Candidates
Vermont at-large	Robert Stafford	Republican	1960	Incumbent re-elected.	▌ ✓ Robert Stafford (Republican) 56.7%; ▌Harold Raynolds (Democratic) 43.3%

== Virginia ==
District	Incumbent			Results	Candidates
District	Member	Party	First elected	Results	Candidates
Virginia 1	Thomas N. Downing	Democratic	1958	Incumbent re-elected.	▌ ✓ Thomas N. Downing (Democratic); Unopposed
Virginia 2	Porter Hardy Jr.	Democratic	1946	Incumbent re-elected.	▌ ✓ Porter Hardy Jr. (Democratic) 75.0%; ▌Louis B. Fine (Republican) 25.0%
Virginia 3	J. Vaughan Gary	Democratic	1945 (special)	Incumbent re-elected.	▌ ✓ J. Vaughan Gary (Democratic) 49.8%; ▌Louis H. Williams (Republican) 49.2%; ▌Alfred T. Dudley (Independent) 1.0%
Virginia 4	Watkins Abbitt	Democratic	1948	Incumbent re-elected.	▌ ✓ Watkins Abbitt (Democratic); Unopposed
Virginia 5	William M. Tuck	Democratic	1953 (special)	Incumbent re-elected.	▌ ✓ William M. Tuck (Democratic); Unopposed
Virginia 6	Richard H. Poff	Republican	1952	Incumbent re-elected.	▌ ✓ Richard H. Poff (Republican) 65.2%; ▌John P. Wheeler (Democratic) 34.5%; ▌J. B. Brayman (Independent) 0.3%
Virginia 7	Burr Harrison	Democratic	1946	Incumbent retired. Democratic hold.	▌ ✓ John O. Marsh Jr. (Democratic) 50.6%; ▌J. Kenneth Robinson (Republican) 49.4%
Virginia 8	Howard W. Smith	Democratic	1930	Incumbent re-elected.	▌ ✓ Howard W. Smith (Democratic); Unopposed
Virginia 9	W. Pat Jennings	Democratic	1954	Incumbent re-elected.	▌ ✓ W. Pat Jennings (Democratic) 61.2%; ▌Leon Owens (Republican) 38.8%
Virginia 10	Joel Broyhill	Republican	1952	Incumbent re-elected.	▌ ✓ Joel Broyhill (Republican) 55.4%; ▌Augustus C. Johnson (Democratic) 44.6%

== Washington ==
District	Incumbent			Results	Candidates
District	Member	Party	First elected	Results	Candidates
Washington 1	Thomas Pelly	Republican	1952	Incumbent re-elected.	▌ ✓ Thomas Pelly (Republican) 73.7%; ▌Alice Franklin Bryant (Democratic) 26.3%
Washington 2	Jack Westland	Republican	1952	Incumbent re-elected.	▌ ✓ Jack Westland (Republican) 59.8%; ▌Milo Moore (Democratic) 40.2%
Washington 3	Julia Butler Hansen	Democratic	1960	Incumbent re-elected.	▌ ✓ Julia Butler Hansen (Democratic) 65.3%; ▌Edwin J. Alexander (Republican) 34.7%
Washington 4	Catherine Dean May	Republican	1958	Incumbent re-elected.	▌ ✓ Catherine Dean May (Republican) 67.0%; ▌David A. Gallant (Democratic) 33.0%
Washington 5	Walt Horan	Republican	1942	Incumbent re-elected.	▌ ✓ Walt Horan (Republican) 64.4%; ▌Bernard J. Gallagher (Democratic) 35.6%
Washington 6	Thor C. Tollefson	Republican	1946	Incumbent re-elected.	▌ ✓ Thor C. Tollefson (Republican) 71.1%; ▌Dawn Olson (Democratic) 28.9%
Washington 7	Don Magnuson	Democratic	1952	Incumbent lost re-election. Republican gain.	▌ ✓ K. William Stinson (Republican) 56.6%; ▌Don Magnuson (Democratic) 43.4%

== West Virginia ==
West Virginia lost one seat and redistricted from 6 districts to 5, splitting the existing 3rd district up among all the others.

District	Incumbent			Results	Candidates
District	Member	Party	First elected	Results	Candidates
West Virginia 1	Arch A. Moore Jr.	Republican	1956	Incumbent re-elected.	▌ ✓ Arch A. Moore Jr. (Republican) 59.9%; ▌Cleveland M. Bailey (Democratic) 40.1%
West Virginia 1	Cleveland M. Bailey; Redistricted from the 3rd district	Democratic	1948	Incumbent lost re-election. Democratic loss.	▌ ✓ Arch A. Moore Jr. (Republican) 59.9%; ▌Cleveland M. Bailey (Democratic) 40.1%
West Virginia 2	Harley Orrin Staggers	Democratic	1948	Incumbent re-elected.	▌ ✓ Harley Orrin Staggers (Democratic) 58.7%; ▌Cooper Benedict (Republican) 41.3%
West Virginia 3	John M. Slack Jr. Redistricted from the 6th district	Democratic	1958	Incumbent re-elected.	▌ ✓ John M. Slack Jr. (Democratic) 61.7%; ▌M. G. Guthrie (Republican) 38.3%
West Virginia 4	Ken Hechler	Democratic	1958	Incumbent re-elected.	▌ ✓ Ken Hechler (Democratic) 57.8%; ▌Clyde Pinson (Republican) 42.2%
West Virginia 5	Elizabeth Kee	Democratic	1951 (special)	Incumbent re-elected.	▌ ✓ Elizabeth Kee (Democratic) 73.1%; ▌James S. Crockett (Republican) 26.9%

== Wisconsin ==
District	Incumbent			Results	Candidates
District	Member	Party	First elected	Results	Candidates
Wisconsin 1	Henry C. Schadeberg	Republican	1960	Incumbent re-elected.	▌ ✓ Henry C. Schadeberg (Republican) 53.3%; ▌Gerald T. Flynn (Democratic) 46.7%
Wisconsin 2	Robert Kastenmeier	Democratic	1958	Incumbent re-elected.	▌ ✓ Robert Kastenmeier (Democratic) 52.5%; ▌Ivan H. Kindschi (Republican) 47.5%
Wisconsin 3	Vernon W. Thomson	Republican	1960	Incumbent re-elected.	▌ ✓ Vernon W. Thomson (Republican) 61.3%; ▌Walter P. Thoresen (Democratic) 38.7%
Wisconsin 4	Clement Zablocki	Democratic	1948	Incumbent re-elected.	▌ ✓ Clement Zablocki (Democratic) 72.5%; ▌David F. Tillotson (Republican) 27.5%
Wisconsin 5	Henry S. Reuss	Democratic	1954	Incumbent re-elected.	▌ ✓ Henry S. Reuss (Democratic) 63.6%; ▌Thomas F. Nelson (Republican) 36.4%
Wisconsin 6	William Van Pelt	Republican	1950	Incumbent re-elected.	▌ ✓ William Van Pelt (Republican) 59.2%; ▌John A. Race (Democratic) 40.8%
Wisconsin 7	Melvin Laird	Republican	1952	Incumbent re-elected.	▌ ✓ Melvin Laird (Republican) 66.1%; ▌John E. Evans (Democratic) 33.9%
Wisconsin 8	John W. Byrnes	Republican	1944	Incumbent re-elected.	▌ ✓ John W. Byrnes (Republican) 62.8%; ▌Owen F. Monfils (Democratic) 37.2%
Wisconsin 9	Lester Johnson	Democratic	1953 (special)	Incumbent re-elected.	▌ ✓ Lester Johnson (Democratic) 55.6%; ▌Dennis B. Danielson (Republican) 44.4%
Wisconsin 10	Alvin O'Konski	Republican	1942	Incumbent re-elected.	▌ ✓ Alvin O'Konski (Republican) 63.2%; ▌J. Louis Hanson (Democratic) 36.8%

== Wyoming ==
District	Incumbent			Results	Candidates
District	Member	Party	First elected	Results	Candidates
Wyoming at-large	William Henry Harrison III	Republican	1950; 1954 (retired); 1960	Incumbent re-elected.	▌ ✓ William Henry Harrison III (Republican) 61.4%; ▌Louis A. Mankus (Democratic) 38.6%

== See also ==
- 1962 United States elections
  - 1962 United States Senate elections
- 87th United States Congress
- 88th United States Congress

== Works cited ==
- Abramson, Paul; Aldrich, John; Rohde, David (1995). Change and Continuity in the 1992 Elections. CQ Press. ISBN 0871878399.
