= 1961 United States House of Representatives elections =

There were seven special elections to the United States House of Representatives in 1961, during 87th United States Congress.

== List of elections ==
District	Incumbent			This race	
District	Member	Party	First elected	Results	Candidates
Arkansas 6	William F. Norrell	Democratic	1938	Incumbent died February 15, 1961. New member elected April 18, 1961 to finish her husband's term. Democratic hold.	▌ ✓ Catherine Dorris Norrell (Democratic) 43.1%; ▌John H. Jones (Democratic) 25.1%; ▌M. C. Lewis (Democratic) 23.2%; ▌James F. Cross (Democratic) 7.3%; ▌Sam D. Carson (Democratic) 1.3%
Arizona 2	Stewart Udall	Democratic	1954	Incumbent resigned January 18, 1961, to become U.S Secretary of the Interior. New member elected May 2, 1961. Democratic hold.	▌ ✓ Mo Udall (Democratic) 51.0%; ▌Mac C. Matheson (Republican) 49.0%
Pennsylvania 16	Walter M. Mumma	Republican	1952	Incumbent died February 25, 1961. New member elected May 16, 1961. Republican hold.	▌ ✓ John C. Kunkel (Republican) 65.6%; ▌Kathryn Z. Vanderslice (Democratic) 34.4%
Tennessee 1	B. Carroll Reece	Republican	1950	Incumbent died March 19, 1961. New member elected May 16, 1961. Republican hold.	▌ ✓ Louise Goff Reece (Republican) 62.9%; ▌William W. Faw (Democratic) 33.2%; ▌Leland A. Davis (Republican) 3.9%
Texas 20	Paul J. Kilday	Democratic	1938	Incumbent resigned September 24, 1961, to become judge of U.S. Court of Appeals for the Armed Forces. New member elected November 4, 1961. Democratic hold.	▌ ✓ Henry B. González (Democratic) 54.6%; ▌John W. Goode (Republican) 44.0%; Others: ▌Ernest T. Cude (Democratic) 0.9%; ▌G. H. Allen (Democratic) 0.3%; ▌Norman Brock (Democratic) 0.2%
Michigan 1	Thaddeus M. Machrowicz	Democratic	1950	Incumbent resigned September 18, 1961, to become a U.S. District Court judge. New member elected November 7, 1961. Democratic hold.	▌ ✓ Lucien Nedzi (Democratic) 85.5%; ▌Walter Czarnecki (Republican) 14.5%
Louisiana 4	Overton Brooks	Democratic	1936	Incumbent died September 16, 1961. New member elected December 19, 1961. Democratic hold.	▌ ✓ Joe Waggonner (Democratic) 54.5%; ▌Charlton H. Lyons Sr. (Republican) 45.5%

== See also ==
- List of special elections to the United States House of Representatives
