= 1962 United States Senate election in Utah =

- November 6, 1962
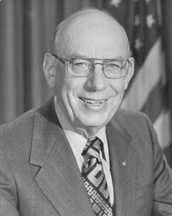

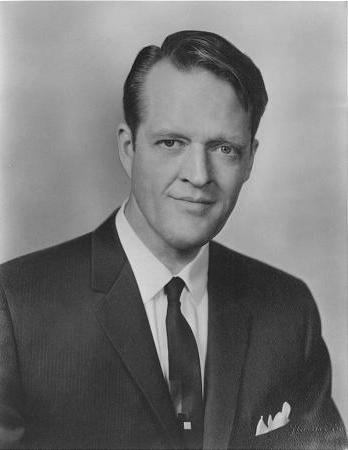
| Nominee | Wallace F. Bennett | David S. King |
| Party | Republican | Democratic |
| Popular vote | 166,755 | 151,656 |
| Percentage | 52.37% | 47.63% |
- County results Bennett: 50–60% 60–70% 70–80% King: 50–60% 60–70%
U.S. senator before election
Wallace F. Bennett
Republican
Elected U.S. Senator
Wallace F. Bennett
Republican

The 1962 United States Senate election in Utah took place on November 6, 1962. Incumbent Republican Senator Wallace F. Bennett won re-election to a third term.

== General election ==
=== Candidates ===
- Wallace F. Bennett, incumbent U.S. senator since 1951 (Republican)
- David S. King, U.S. representative from Salt Lake City (Democratic)

=== Results ===
1962 U.S. Senate election in Utah
| Party | Candidate | Votes | % |
|---|---|---|---|
| Republican | Wallace F. Bennett (incumbent) | 166,755 | 52.37% |
| Democratic | David S. King | 151,656 | 47.63% |
| Turnout | | 318,411 | |
| Republican hold | | | |
