= Sherman P. Lloyd =

American politician

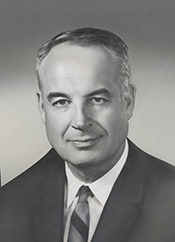

Member of the U.S. House of Representatives from Utah's 2nd district
- In office January 3, 1967 – January 3, 1973
- Preceded by: David S. King
- Succeeded by: Wayne Owens
- In office January 3, 1963 – January 3, 1965
- Preceded by: David S. King
- Succeeded by: David S. King

Member of the Utah Senate
- In office 1954–1962

Personal details
- Born: Sherman Parkinson Lloyd; January 11, 1914 St. Anthony, Idaho, U.S.
- Died: December 15, 1979 (aged 65) Salt Lake City, Utah, U.S.
- Resting place: Salt Lake City Cemetery; 40°46′37.92″N 111°51′28.8″W
- Party: Republican
- Spouse: Edith Ann Gunn
- Children: 4
- Education: Utah State University (BS); George Washington University (LLB)
- Occupation: Lawyer

Sherman Parkinson Lloyd (January 11, 1914 – December 15, 1979) was an American lawyer and politician who served four terms as a U.S. representative from Utah between 1963 and 1973.

== Early life and education ==
Lloyd was born in St. Anthony, Fremont County, Idaho, Lloyd's father was a counselor in the Stake Presidency at the time. Three of his grandparents were English immigrants. Lloyd attended St. Anthony and Rexburg public schools. Lloyd was a member of the Church of Jesus Christ of Latter-day Saints. Lloyd received his B.S. from Utah State University in 1935 and then studied law at George Washington University from which he received his LL.B. in 1939.

== Career ==
As a law student, Lloyd worked as an employee of the United States Department of Agriculture.

He was admitted to the bar in 1939 and began practice of law in Salt Lake City, Utah. He served as general counsel for Utah Retail Grocers Association from 1940 to 1962. He served as a member of the Utah State Senate from 1954 to 1962, majority leader in 1957, president in 1959, and minority leader in 1961.

=== Early political career ===
He served as a member of Utah Legislative Council from 1957 to 1961, and chairman from 1959 to 1961. He served as Utah representative on board of managers of Council of State Governments from 1959 to 1961. He served as chairman of the Council of State Governments Committee on State Taxation of Interstate Income from 1961 to 1962. He then served as director of Beehive State Bank from 1960 to 1966. He served as a delegate to the 1960, 1962, 1964, and 1966 Republican state conventions. He also served as a delegate to the 1960 Republican National Convention. He was an unsuccessful candidate for Congress in 1960.

=== Congress ===
Lloyd was elected as a Republican to the Eighty-eighth Congress on November 6, 1962, defeating fellow State Senator Bruce Sterling Jenkins. Lloyd served in Congress from January 3, 1963 to January 3, 1965. He was not a candidate for re-election in 1964, choosing to launch an unsuccessful bid for United States Senate. He then returned to Utah to become vice president of Prudential Federal Savings, where he managed public relations. Lloyd was also a lecturer at the University of Utah.

Lloyd was elected to the Ninetieth and to the two succeeding Congresses (January 3, 1967 – January 3, 1973). He was an unsuccessful candidate for re-election in 1972. He was later appointed assistant director of the United States Information Agency in 1973. He again returned to Utah to teach at Utah State University from 1973 to 1974, holding the Milton R. Merrill Chair in Political Science.

=== Later career ===
Lloyd was named a trade specialist in charge of the Utah office of the United States Department of Commerce in 1974. He was an unsuccessful candidate 1976 United States Senate election in Utah. After his primary defeat, he became an editor and publisher.

== Death and burial ==
Lloyd resided in Salt Lake City, where he died, December 15, 1979. He was interred in Salt Lake City Cemetery.

U.S. House of Representatives
Preceded by David S. King	Member of the U.S. House of Representatives from Utah's 2nd congressional district 1963-1965	Succeeded by David S. King
Preceded by David S. King	Member of the U.S. House of Representatives from Utah's 2nd congressional district 1967-1973	Succeeded by Wayne Owens
