= David S. King =

American politician (1917–2009)

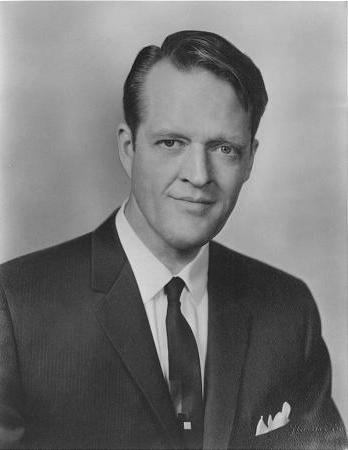

Member of the U.S. House of Representatives from Utah's 2nd district
- In office January 3, 1965 – January 3, 1967
- Preceded by: Sherman P. Lloyd
- Succeeded by: Sherman P. Lloyd
- In office January 3, 1959 – January 3, 1963
- Preceded by: William A. Dawson
- Succeeded by: Sherman P. Lloyd

United States Ambassador to Madagascar
- In office January 26, 1967 – August 16, 1969
- President: Lyndon B. Johnson; Richard M. Nixon
- Preceded by: C. Vaughan Ferguson, Jr.
- Succeeded by: Anthony D. Marshall

United States Ambassador to Mauritius
- In office July 29, 1968 – August 16, 1969
- President: Lyndon B. Johnson; Richard M. Nixon
- Preceded by: William B. Hussey
- Succeeded by: William D. Brewer

Personal details
- Born: David Sjodahl King; June 20, 1917 Salt Lake City, Utah, United States
- Died: May 5, 2009 (aged 91) Kensington, Maryland, United States
- Party: Democratic
- Spouse: Rosalie King
- Children: 8, including Jody
- Education: University of Utah; Georgetown University Law School
- Occupation: Lawyer

David Sjodahl King (June 20, 1917 – May 5, 2009) was an American attorney and politician who served as a representative from Utah. He served three terms between 1959 and 1967.

He was a member of the Democratic Party.

== Early life and education ==
King was born in Salt Lake City, Utah, in 1917. He graduated from the University of Utah in 1937. From 1937 to 1939, he served as a missionary for the Church of Jesus Christ of Latter-day Saints (LDS Church) in Great Britain. After his mission, King attended and graduated from Georgetown University Law School. After serving as a clerk for Justice Howard M. Stephens of the United States Court of Appeals for the District of Columbia in 1943, King returned to Utah.

== Legal and political career ==
King served as counsel to the Utah Tax Commission from 1944 to 1946. He also was involved in private practice from 1945. From 1946 to 1958, he taught commercial law at Intermountain Business College. From 1948 to 1958, King was the second assistant to Elbert R. Curtis, who was the ninth General Superintendent of the LDS Church's Young Men's Mutual Improvement Association.

=== Congress ===
King was elected as a Democrat to the 86th and 87th United States Congresses between January 3, 1959, and January 3, 1963. He was not a candidate for renomination in 1962, choosing instead to run for a seat in the United States Senate. His senatorial campaign was unsuccessful. King was elected to the 89th Congress in 1964, but was defeated in his bid for reelection in 1966.

=== Later career ===
He was appointed United States Ambassador to Madagascar and to Mauritius in January 1967 and in May 1968, respectively, serving in those two positions concurrently until August 1969.

During the 1970s and 1980s, King practiced law in Washington, D.C., and served as an alternate director at the World Bank. He retired in 1986 to devote his time to serving the LDS Church.

== LDS Church service ==
From July 1986 to June 1989, he served as president of the church's Haiti Port-au-Prince Mission. From September 1990 to 1993 he was president of the Washington D.C. Temple in Kensington, Maryland. In 1994, he was called as patriarch of the Washington D.C. Stake and the church's district for the District of Columbia.

== Family life ==
King was a resident of Kensington, Maryland where he lived with his wife of 61 years, Rosalie King. They were the parents of eight children, including Josephine "Jody" Olsen who became Director of the Peace Corps in 2018. His father, William H. King, was a Senator from Utah. He was preceded in death by his sons David King Jr., and Elliott West King. David King died on May 5, 2009.

== Genealogy ==
King was a direct patrilineal descendant of Edmund Rice, an English immigrant to Massachusetts Bay Colony, as follows:

- David Sjodahl King, son of

- William Henry King, (1863 – 1949), son of
- William King (1834 – 1892), son of
- Thomas Rice King (1813 – 1879), son of

- Thomas King (1770 – 1845), son of
- William King (1724 – 1793), son of

- Ezra Rice King (1697 – 1746), son of

- Samuel Rice King (1667 – 1713), son of

- Samuel Rice (1634 – 1684), son of

- Edmund Rice (1594 – 1663)

== Published works ==
- King, David S. (2000), Come to the House of the Lord, Horizon Publishers & Distributors Inc., ISBN 0-88290-687-9

== See also ==
- Janne M. Sjödahl: maternal grandfather

Party political offices
Preceded by Alonzo F. Hopkin	Democratic nominee for U.S. Senator from Utah (Class 3); 1962	Succeeded by Milton N. Weilenmann
U.S. House of Representatives
Preceded by William A. Dawson	Member of the U.S. House of Representatives from Utah's 2nd congressional district 1959-1963	Succeeded by Sherman P. Lloyd
Preceded by Sherman P. Lloyd	Member of the U.S. House of Representatives from Utah's 2nd congressional district 1965-1967	Succeeded by Sherman P. Lloyd
Diplomatic posts
Preceded by C. Vaughan Ferguson, Jr.	United States Ambassador to Madagascar; 1967–1969	Succeeded by Anthony D. Marshall
Preceded by William B. Hussey	United States Ambassador to Mauritius; 1968–1969	Succeeded by William D. Brewer
