= 86th United States Congress =

1959–1961 U.S. Congress

←	85th	87th	→
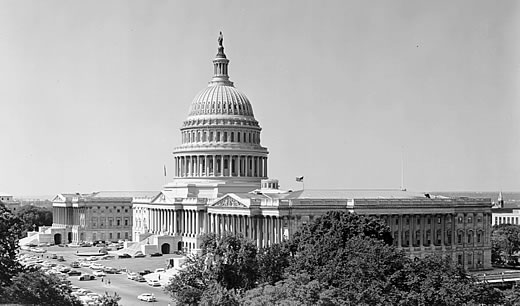
- United States Capitol (1956)

Overview
- Legislative body: United States Congress
- Jurisdiction: United States
- Term: January 3, 1959 – January 3, 1961

Senate
- Members: 98–100
- President: Richard Nixon (R)
- President pro tempore: Carl Hayden (D)
- Party control: Democratic

House of Representatives
- Members: 436–437
- Speaker: Sam Rayburn (D)
- Party control: Democratic

Sessions
- 1st: January 7, 1959 – September 15, 1959
- 2nd: January 6, 1960 – September 1, 1960

The 86th United States Congress was a meeting of the legislative branch of the United States federal government, composed of the United States Senate and the United States House of Representatives. It met in Washington, D.C. from January 3, 1959, to January 3, 1961, during the last two years of the presidency of Dwight D. Eisenhower.

The apportionment of seats in the House of Representatives was based on the 1950 United States census until Alaska and Hawaii were admitted as states in 1959. Then, the membership of the House temporarily increased to 437 (seating one member from each of those newly admitted states and leaving the apportionment of the other 435 seats unchanged); it would remain at 437 until reapportionment resulting from the 1960 census.

The Democrats maintained full control of Congress, with greatly increased majorities in both chambers.

== Major events ==
- January 7, 1959: The United States recognizes the new Cuban government of Fidel Castro
- February 12, 1959: In commemorations of the 150th anniversary of Abraham Lincoln's birth, Congress met in joint session to hear actor Fredric March give a dramatic reading of the Gettysburg Address, followed with an address by writer Carl Sandburg
- February 1, 1960: Greensboro sit-ins begin
- May 1, 1960: U-2 incident
- June 29, 1960: King Bhumibol Adulyadej of Thailand addresses a Joint Meeting of Congress
- November 8, 1960: 1960 United States presidential election: John F. Kennedy elected

== Major legislation ==
- 1959: Airport Construction Act, Pub. L. 86–72
- September 14, 1959: Landrum–Griffin Act, Pub. L. 86–257, 73 Stat. 519
- April 22, 1960: Narcotics Manufacturing Act of 1960, Pub. L. 86–429, 74 Stat. 55
- May 6, 1960: Civil Rights Act of 1960, Pub. L. 86–449, 74 Stat. 86
- June 12, 1960: Multiple-Use Sustained-Yield Act of 1960, Pub. L. 86–517, 74 Stat. 215
- July 14, 1960: Flood Control Act of 1960, Pub. L. 86–845, 74 Stat. 488
- September 13, 1960: Social Security Amendments (Kerr-Mill aid), Pub. L. 86–778, 74 Stat. 976

== Constitutional amendments ==
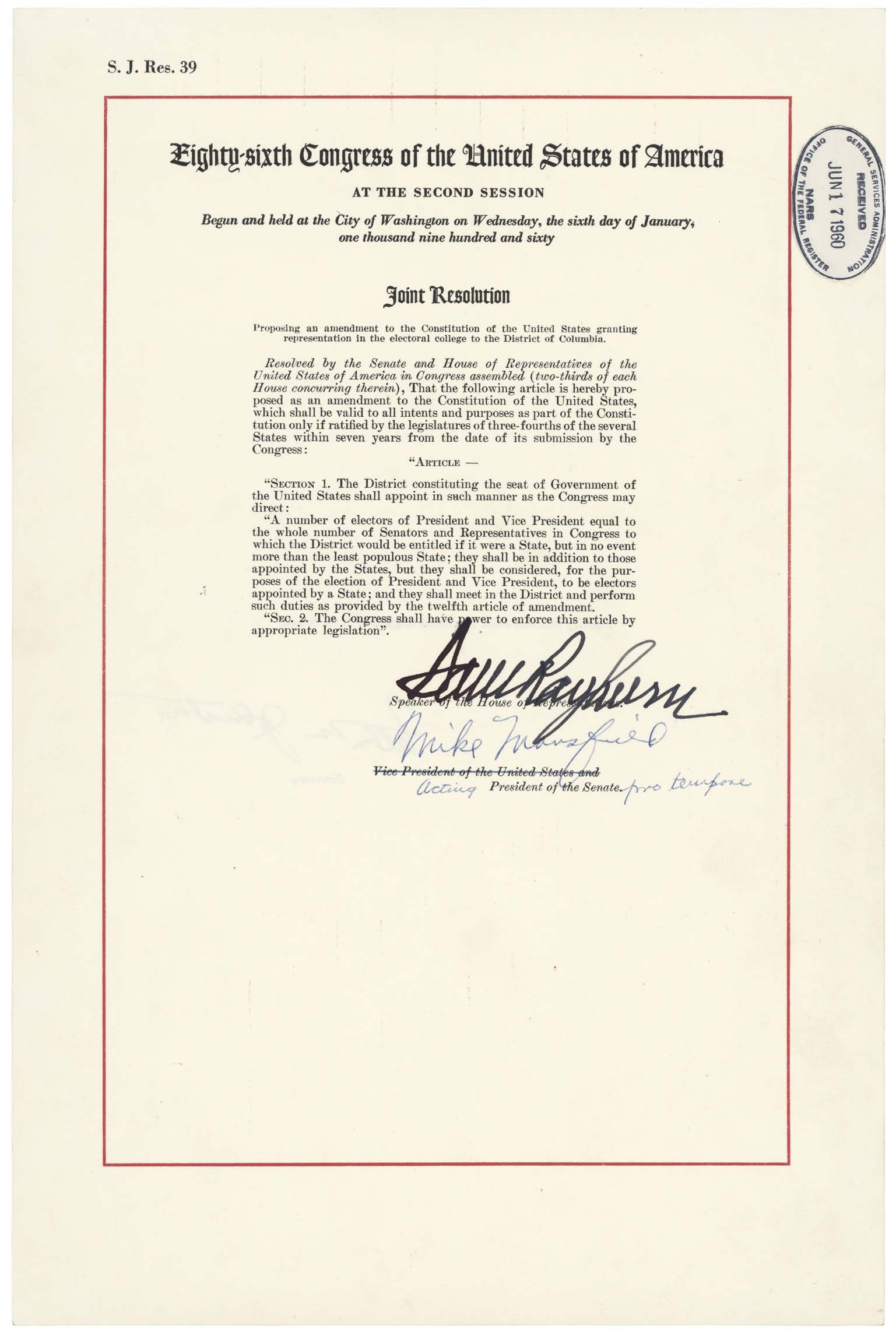
The official Joint Resolution of Congress proposing what became the 23rd Amendment as contained in the National Archives

- June 16, 1960: Approved an amendment to the United States Constitution extending the right to vote in the presidential election to citizens residing in the District of Columbia by granting the District electors in the Electoral College, as if it were a state, and submitted it to the state legislatures for ratification
  - Amendment was later ratified on March 29, 1961, becoming the Twenty-third Amendment to the United States Constitution

== Treaties ==
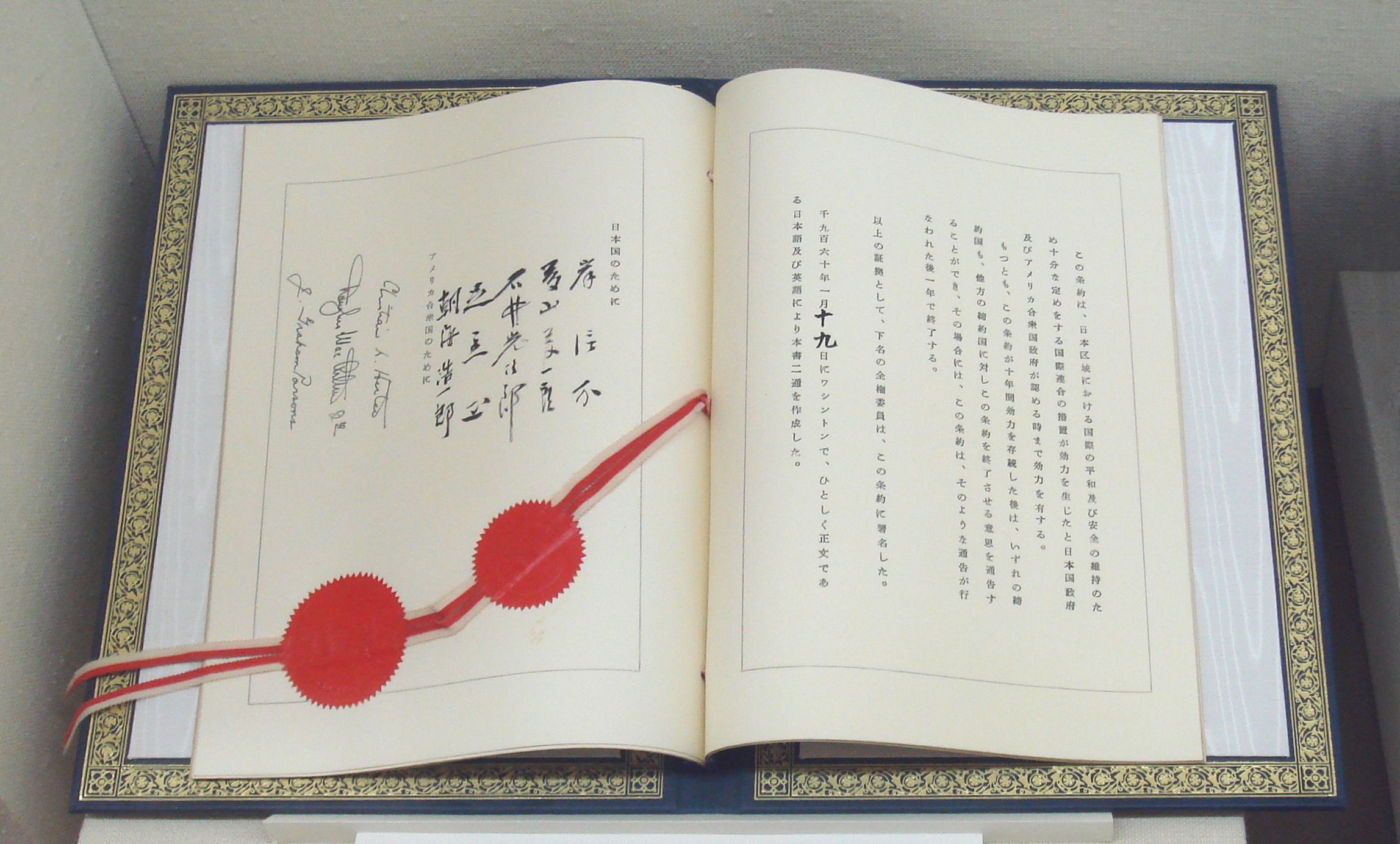
Treaty of Mutual Cooperation and Security between the United States and Japan

- December 1, 1959: Antarctic Treaty signed
- January 19, 1960: Treaty of Mutual Cooperation and Security between the United States and Japan signed

== States admitted ==
- January 3, 1959: Alaska was admitted as the 49th state
- August 21, 1959: Hawaii was admitted as the 50th state

== Party summary ==
=== Senate ===
	Party (shading shows control)		Total	Vacant
	Democratic (D)	Republican (R)	Total	Vacant
End of previous congress	50	45	95	1
Begin	64	34	98	0
End	66	34	100	0
Final voting share	66.0%	34.0%		
Beginning of next congress	65	35	100	0

=== House of Representatives ===
	Party (shading shows control)		Total	Vacant
	Democratic (D)	Republican (R)	Total	Vacant
End of previous congress	232	193	425	10
Begin	282	153	435	0
End	281	151	432	5
Final voting share	65.0%	35.0%		
Beginning of next congress	263	174	437	0

Total members: 437. The increase over the usual 435 members was due to the admission of Alaska and Hawaii, whose seats were temporary until reapportionment following the 1960 census.

== Leadership ==
Senate President

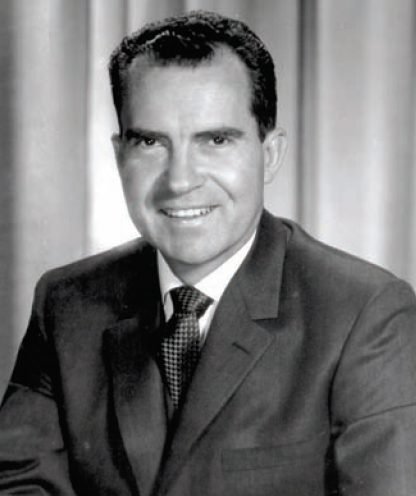
Richard Nixon (R)

Senate President pro tempore

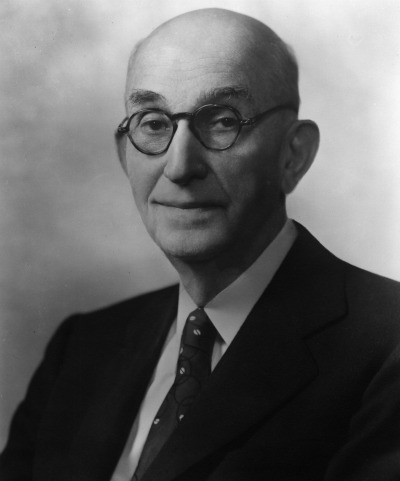
Carl Hayden (D)

House Speaker

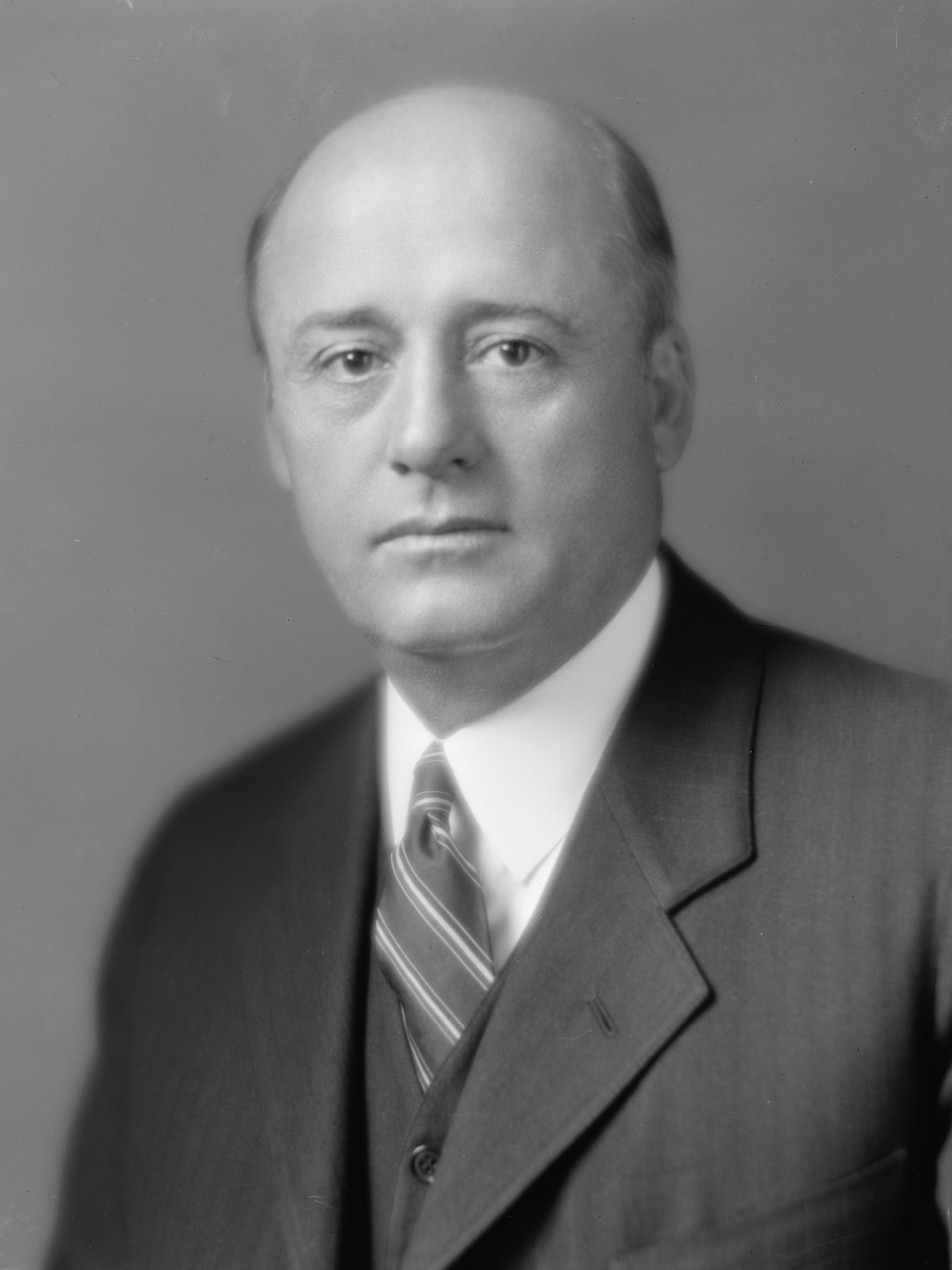
Sam Rayburn (D)

=== Senate ===
- President: Richard Nixon (R)
- President pro tempore: Carl Hayden (D)

==== Majority (Democratic) leadership ====
- Majority Leader: Lyndon B. Johnson
- Majority Whip: Mike Mansfield
- Caucus Secretary: Thomas C. Hennings Jr., until September 13, 1960
  - George Smathers, afterwards

==== Minority (Republican) leadership ====
- Minority Leader: Everett Dirksen
- Minority Whip: Thomas Kuchel
- Republican Conference Chairman: Leverett Saltonstall
- Republican Conference Secretary: Milton Young
- National Senatorial Committee Chair: Andrew Frank Schoeppel
- Policy Committee Chairman: Styles Bridges

=== House of Representatives ===
- Speaker: Sam Rayburn (D)

==== Majority (Democratic) leadership ====
- Majority Leader: John W. McCormack
- Majority Whip: Carl Albert
- Democratic Caucus Chairman: Melvin Price
- Democratic Caucus Secretary: Leonor Sullivan
- Democratic Campaign Committee Chairman: Michael J. Kirwan

==== Minority (Republican) leadership ====
- Minority Leader: Charles A. Halleck
- Minority Whip: Leslie C. Arends
- Republican Conference Chairman: Charles B. Hoeven
- Policy Committee Chairman: John W. Byrnes
- Republican Campaign Committee Chairman: Richard M. Simpson, until 1960
  - William E. Miller, from 1960

== Caucuses ==
- House Democratic Caucus
- Senate Democratic Caucus

== Members ==
=== Senate ===
Senators are popularly elected statewide every two years, with one-third beginning new six-year terms with each Congress. Preceding the names in the list below are Senate class numbers, which indicate the cycle of their election, In this Congress, Class 2 meant their term ended with this Congress, requiring reelection in 1960; Class 3 meant their term began in the last Congress, requiring reelection in 1962; and Class 1 meant their term began in this Congress, requiring reelection in 1964.

==== Alabama ====
▌2. John Sparkman (D)
▌3. J. Lister Hill (D)

==== Alaska ====
▌2. Bob Bartlett (D)
▌3. Ernest Gruening (D)

==== Arizona ====
▌1. Barry Goldwater (R)
▌3. Carl Hayden (D)

==== Arkansas ====
▌2. John L. McClellan (D)
▌3. J. William Fulbright (D)

==== California ====
▌1. Clair Engle (D)
▌3. Thomas Kuchel (R)

==== Colorado ====
▌2. Gordon Allott (R)
▌3. John A. Carroll (D)

==== Connecticut ====
▌1. Thomas J. Dodd (D)
▌3. Prescott Bush (R)

==== Delaware ====
▌1. John J. Williams (R)
▌2. J. Allen Frear Jr. (D)

==== Florida ====
▌1. Spessard Holland (D)
▌3. George Smathers (D)

==== Georgia ====
▌2. Richard Russell Jr. (D)
▌3. Herman Talmadge (D)

==== Hawaii ====
▌1. Hiram Fong (R), from August 21, 1959 (newly admitted state)
▌3. Oren E. Long (D), from August 21, 1959 (newly admitted state)

==== Idaho ====
▌2. Henry Dworshak (R)
▌3. Frank Church (D)

==== Illinois ====
▌2. Paul Douglas (D)
▌3. Everett Dirksen (R)

==== Indiana ====
▌1. Vance Hartke (D)
▌3. Homer E. Capehart (R)

==== Iowa ====
▌2. Thomas E. Martin (R)
▌3. Bourke B. Hickenlooper (R)

==== Kansas ====
▌2. Andrew Frank Schoeppel (R)
▌3. Frank Carlson (R)

==== Kentucky ====
▌2. John Sherman Cooper (R)
▌3. Thruston Ballard Morton (R)

==== Louisiana ====
▌2. Allen J. Ellender (D)
▌3. Russell B. Long (D)

==== Maine ====
▌1. Edmund Muskie (D)
▌2. Margaret Chase Smith (R)

==== Maryland ====
▌1. J. Glenn Beall (R)
▌3. John Marshall Butler (R)

==== Massachusetts ====
▌1. John F. Kennedy (D), until December 22, 1960

▌Benjamin A. Smith II (D), from December 27, 1960

▌2. Leverett Saltonstall (R)

==== Michigan ====
▌1. Philip Hart (D)
▌2. Patrick V. McNamara (D)

==== Minnesota ====
▌1. Eugene McCarthy (DFL) (Note: The Minnesota Democratic–Farmer–Labor Party (DFL) and the North Dakota Democratic-Nonpartisan League Party (D-NPL) are the Minnesota and North Dakota affiliates of the U.S. Democratic Party and are counted as Democrats.)
▌2. Hubert Humphrey (DFL)

==== Mississippi ====
▌1. John C. Stennis (D)
▌2. James Eastland (D)

==== Missouri ====
▌1. Stuart Symington (D)
▌3. Thomas C. Hennings Jr. (D), until September 13, 1960

▌Edward V. Long (D), from September 23, 1960

==== Montana ====
▌1. Mike Mansfield (D)
▌2. James E. Murray (D)

==== Nebraska ====
▌1. Roman Hruska (R)
▌2. Carl Curtis (R)

==== Nevada ====
▌1. Howard Cannon (D)
▌3. Alan Bible (D)

==== New Hampshire ====
▌2. Styles Bridges (R)
▌3. Norris Cotton (R)

==== New Jersey ====
▌1. Harrison A. Williams (D)
▌2. Clifford P. Case (R)

==== New Mexico ====
▌1. Dennis Chávez (D)
▌2. Clinton Anderson (D)

==== New York ====
▌1. Kenneth Keating (R)
▌3. Jacob Javits (R)

==== North Carolina ====
▌2. B. Everett Jordan (D)
▌3. Sam Ervin (D)

==== North Dakota ====
▌1. William Langer (R-NPL), until November 8, 1959

▌Norman Brunsdale (R), November 19, 1959 – August 7, 1960
▌Quentin Burdick (D-NPL), from August 8, 1960

▌3. Milton Young (R)

==== Ohio ====
▌1. Stephen M. Young (D)
▌3. Frank Lausche (D)

==== Oklahoma ====
▌2. Robert S. Kerr (D)
▌3. Mike Monroney (D)

==== Oregon ====
▌2. Richard L. Neuberger (D), until March 9, 1960

▌Hall S. Lusk (D), March 16, 1960 – November 8, 1960
▌Maurine Neuberger (D), from November 9, 1960

▌3. Wayne Morse (D)

==== Pennsylvania ====
▌1. Hugh Scott (R)
▌3. Joseph S. Clark Jr. (D)

==== Rhode Island ====
▌1. John Pastore (D)
▌2. Theodore F. Green (D)

==== South Carolina ====
▌2. Strom Thurmond (D)
▌3. Olin D. Johnston (D)

==== South Dakota ====
▌2. Karl Mundt (R)
▌3. Francis Case (R)

==== Tennessee ====
▌1. Albert Gore Sr. (D)
▌2. Estes Kefauver (D)

==== Texas ====
▌1. Ralph Yarborough (D)
▌2. Lyndon B. Johnson (D)

==== Utah ====
▌1. Frank Moss (D)
▌3. Wallace F. Bennett (R)

==== Vermont ====
▌1. Winston L. Prouty (R)
▌3. George Aiken (R)

==== Virginia ====
▌1. Harry F. Byrd (D)
▌2. A. Willis Robertson (D)

==== Washington ====
▌1. Henry M. Jackson (D)
▌3. Warren G. Magnuson (D)

==== West Virginia ====
▌1. Robert Byrd (D)
▌2. Jennings Randolph (D)

==== Wisconsin ====
▌1. William Proxmire (D)
▌3. Alexander Wiley (R)

==== Wyoming ====
▌1. Gale W. McGee (D)
▌2. Joseph C. O'Mahoney (D)

Senate majority leaders

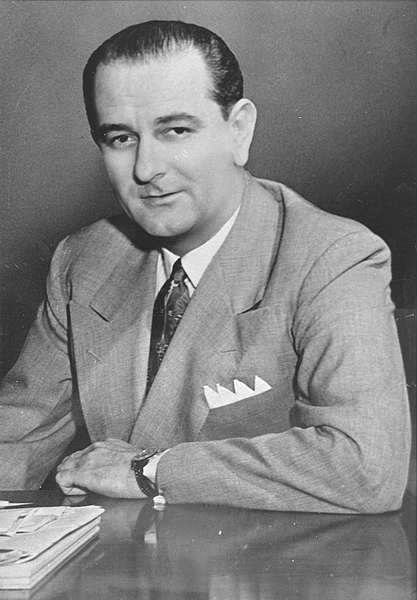
Democratic Leader
Lyndon B. Johnson

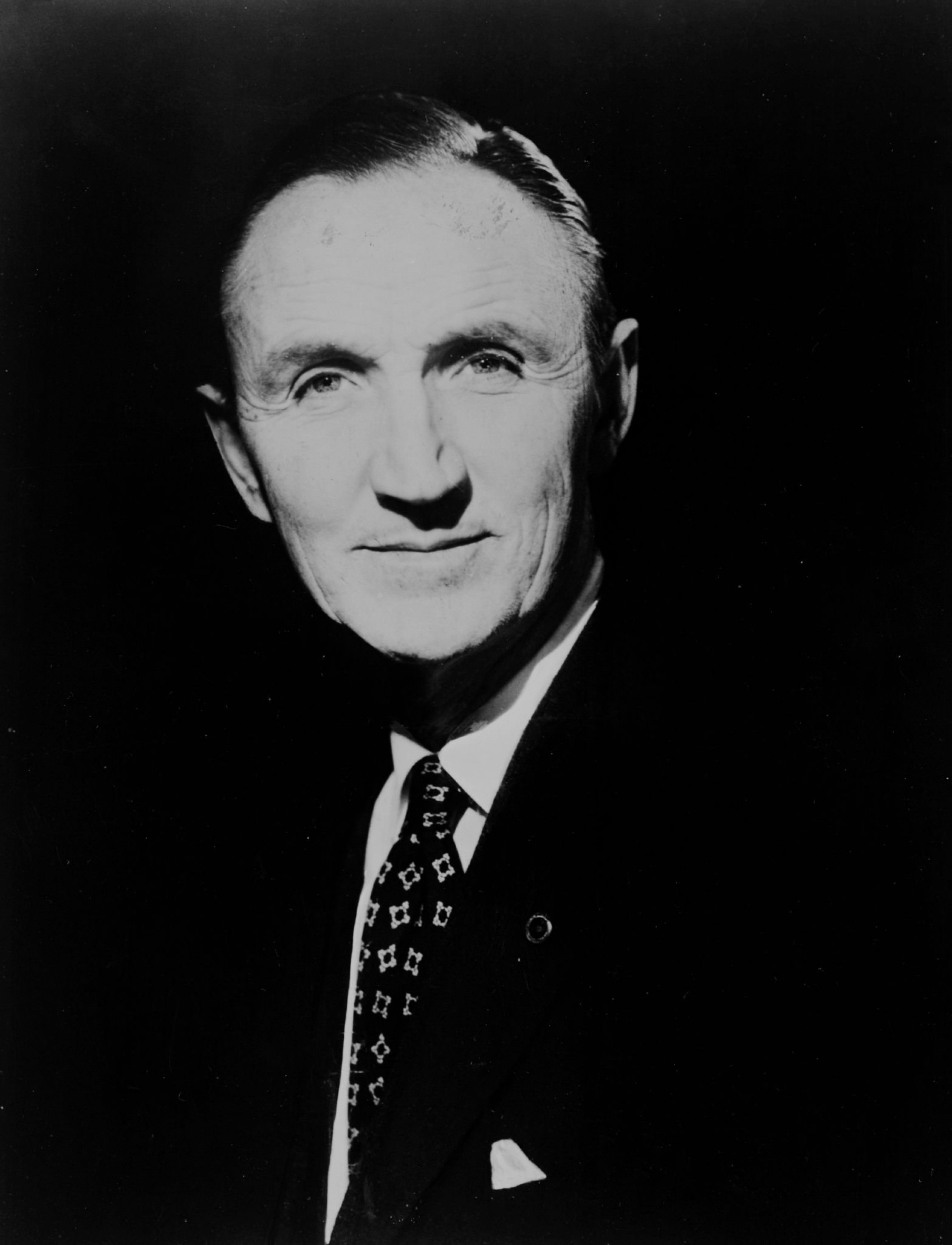
Democratic Whip
Mike Mansfield

Senate minority leaders

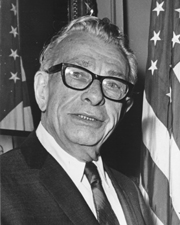
Republican Leader
Everett Dirksen

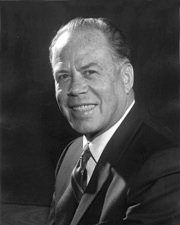
Republican Whip
Thomas Kuchel

Senate composition by party at the beginning of the 86th Congress (Alaska was admitted as a state on the same day this Congress started). Senators from Hawaii did not take office until later in 1959. 2 Democrats 1 Democrat and 1 Republican 2 Republicans

=== House of Representatives ===
The names of representatives are preceded by their district numbers.

==== Alabama ====
▌1. Frank W. Boykin (D)
▌2. George M. Grant (D)
▌3. George W. Andrews (D)
▌4. Kenneth A. Roberts (D)
▌5. Albert Rains (D)
▌6. Armistead I. Selden Jr. (D)
▌7. Carl Elliott (D)
▌8. Robert E. Jones Jr. (D)
▌9. George Huddleston Jr. (D)

==== Alaska ====
▌At-large. Ralph Rivers (D)

==== Arizona ====
▌1. John Jacob Rhodes (R)
▌2. Stewart Udall (D)

==== Arkansas ====
▌1. Ezekiel C. Gathings (D)
▌2. Wilbur Mills (D)
▌3. James William Trimble (D)
▌4. Oren Harris (D)
▌5. Dale Alford (D)
▌6. William F. Norrell (D)

==== California ====
▌1. Clem Miller (D)
▌2. Bizz Johnson (D)
▌3. John E. Moss (D)
▌4. William S. Mailliard (R)
▌5. John F. Shelley (D)
▌6. John F. Baldwin Jr. (R)
▌7. Jeffery Cohelan (D)
▌8. George P. Miller (D)
▌9. J. Arthur Younger (R)
▌10. Charles Gubser (R)
▌11. John J. McFall (D)
▌12. B. F. Sisk (D)
▌13. Charles M. Teague (R)
▌14. Harlan Hagen (D)
▌15. Gordon L. McDonough (R)
▌16. Donald L. Jackson (R)
▌17. Cecil R. King (D)
▌18. Craig Hosmer (R)
▌19. Chet Holifield (D)
▌20. H. Allen Smith (R)
▌21. Edgar W. Hiestand (R)
▌22. Joseph F. Holt (R)
▌23. Clyde Doyle (D)
▌24. Glenard P. Lipscomb (R)
▌25. George A. Kasem (D)
▌26. James Roosevelt (D)
▌27. Harry R. Sheppard (D)
▌28. James B. Utt (R)
▌29. Dalip Singh Saund (D)
▌30. Bob Wilson (R)

==== Colorado ====
▌1. Byron G. Rogers (D)
▌2. Byron L. Johnson (D)
▌3. John Chenoweth (R)
▌4. Wayne N. Aspinall (D)

==== Connecticut ====
▌1. Emilio Q. Daddario (D)
▌2. Chester Bowles (D)
▌3. Robert Giaimo (D)
▌4. Donald J. Irwin (D)
▌5. John S. Monagan (D)
▌At-large. Frank Kowalski (D)

==== Delaware ====
▌At-large. Harris McDowell (D)

==== Florida ====
▌1. William C. Cramer (R)
▌2. Charles E. Bennett (D)
▌3. Bob Sikes (D)
▌4. Dante Fascell (D)
▌5. Syd Herlong (D)
▌6. Paul Rogers (D)
▌7. James A. Haley (D)
▌8. D. R. Matthews (D)

==== Georgia ====
▌1. Prince Hulon Preston Jr. (D)
▌2. J. L. Pilcher (D)
▌3. Tic Forrester (D)
▌4. John Flynt (D)
▌5. James C. Davis (D)
▌6. Carl Vinson (D)
▌7. Harlan Mitchell (D)
▌8. Iris Faircloth Blitch (D)
▌9. Phillip M. Landrum (D)
▌10. Paul Brown (D)

==== Hawaii ====
▌At-large. Daniel Inouye (D), from August 21, 1959 (newly admitted state)

==== Idaho ====
▌1. Gracie Pfost (D)
▌2. Hamer H. Budge (R)

==== Illinois ====
▌1. William L. Dawson (D)
▌2. Barratt O'Hara (D)
▌3. William T. Murphy (D)
▌4. Ed Derwinski (R)
▌5. John C. Kluczynski (D)
▌6. Thomas J. O'Brien (D)
▌7. Roland V. Libonati (D)
▌8. Dan Rostenkowski (D)
▌9. Sidney R. Yates (D)
▌10. Harold R. Collier (R)
▌11. Roman Pucinski (D)
▌12. Charles A. Boyle (D), until November 4, 1959
▌13. Marguerite Stitt Church (R)
▌14. Elmer J. Hoffman (R)
▌15. Noah M. Mason (R)
▌16. Leo E. Allen (R)
▌17. Leslie C. Arends (R)
▌18. Robert H. Michel (R)
▌19. Robert B. Chiperfield (R)
▌20. Edna O. Simpson (R)
▌21. Peter F. Mack Jr. (D)
▌22. William L. Springer (R)
▌23. George E. Shipley (D)
▌24. Melvin Price (D)
▌25. Kenneth J. Gray (D)

==== Indiana ====
▌1. Ray Madden (D)
▌2. Charles A. Halleck (R)
▌3. John Brademas (D)
▌4. E. Ross Adair (R)
▌5. J. Edward Roush (D)
▌6. Fred Wampler (D)
▌7. William G. Bray (R)
▌8. Winfield K. Denton (D)
▌9. Earl Hogan (D)
▌10. Randall S. Harmon (D)
▌11. Joseph W. Barr (D)

==== Iowa ====
▌1. Fred Schwengel (R)
▌2. Leonard G. Wolf (D)
▌3. H. R. Gross (R)
▌4. Steven V. Carter (D), until November 4, 1959

▌John Henry Kyl (R), from December 15, 1959

▌5. Neal Smith (D)
▌6. Merwin Coad (D)
▌7. Ben F. Jensen (R)
▌8. Charles B. Hoeven (R)

==== Kansas ====
▌1. William H. Avery (R)
▌2. Newell A. George (D)
▌3. Denver D. Hargis (D)
▌4. Edward H. Rees (R)
▌5. J. Floyd Breeding (D)
▌6. Wint Smith (R)

==== Kentucky ====
▌1. Frank Stubblefield (D)
▌2. William Natcher (D)
▌3. Frank W. Burke (D)
▌4. Frank Chelf (D)
▌5. Brent Spence (D)
▌6. John C. Watts (D)
▌7. Carl D. Perkins (D)
▌8. Eugene Siler (R)

==== Louisiana ====
▌1. F. Edward Hébert (D)
▌2. Hale Boggs (D)
▌3. Edwin E. Willis (D)
▌4. Overton Brooks (D)
▌5. Otto Passman (D)
▌6. James H. Morrison (D)
▌7. T. Ashton Thompson (D)
▌8. Harold B. McSween (D)

==== Maine ====
▌1. James C. Oliver (D)
▌2. Frank M. Coffin (D)
▌3. Clifford McIntire (R)

==== Maryland ====
▌1. Thomas Francis Johnson (D)
▌2. Daniel Brewster (D)
▌3. Edward Garmatz (D)
▌4. George Hyde Fallon (D)
▌5. Richard Lankford (D)
▌6. John R. Foley (D)
▌7. Samuel Friedel (D)

==== Massachusetts ====
▌1. Silvio O. Conte (R)
▌2. Edward Boland (D)
▌3. Philip J. Philbin (D)
▌4. Harold Donohue (D)
▌5. Edith Nourse Rogers (R), until September 10, 1960
▌6. William H. Bates (R)
▌7. Thomas J. Lane (D)
▌8. Torbert Macdonald (D)
▌9. Hastings Keith (R)
▌10. Laurence Curtis (R)
▌11. Tip O'Neill (D)
▌12. John W. McCormack (D)
▌13. James A. Burke (D)
▌14. Joseph W. Martin Jr. (R)

==== Michigan ====
▌1. Thaddeus M. Machrowicz (D)
▌2. George Meader (R)
▌3. August E. Johansen (R)
▌4. Clare E. Hoffman (R)
▌5. Gerald Ford (R)
▌6. Charles E. Chamberlain (R)
▌7. James G. O'Hara (D)
▌8. Alvin Morell Bentley (R)
▌9. Robert P. Griffin (R)
▌10. Al Cederberg (R)
▌11. Victor A. Knox (R)
▌12. John B. Bennett (R)
▌13. Charles Diggs (D)
▌14. Louis C. Rabaut (D)
▌15. John D. Dingell Jr. (D)
▌16. John Lesinski Jr. (D)
▌17. Martha Griffiths (D)
▌18. William Broomfield (R)

==== Minnesota ====
▌1. Al Quie (R)
▌2. Ancher Nelsen (R)
▌3. Roy Wier (DFL)
▌4. Joseph Karth (DFL)
▌5. Walter Judd (R)
▌6. Fred Marshall (DFL)
▌7. H. Carl Andersen (R)
▌8. John Blatnik (DFL)
▌9. Odin Langen (R)

==== Mississippi ====
▌1. Thomas Abernethy (D)
▌2. Jamie Whitten (D)
▌3. Frank Ellis Smith (D)
▌4. John Bell Williams (D)
▌5. W. Arthur Winstead (D)
▌6. William M. Colmer (D)

==== Missouri ====
▌1. Frank M. Karsten (D)
▌2. Thomas B. Curtis (R)
▌3. Leonor Sullivan (D)
▌4. George H. Christopher (D), until January 23, 1959

▌William J. Randall (D), from March 3, 1959

▌5. Richard W. Bolling (D)
▌6. William R. Hull Jr. (D)
▌7. Charles Harrison Brown (D)
▌8. A. S. J. Carnahan (D)
▌9. Clarence Cannon (D)
▌10. Paul C. Jones (D)
▌11. Morgan M. Moulder (D)

==== Montana ====
▌1. Lee Metcalf (D)
▌2. LeRoy H. Anderson (D)

==== Nebraska ====
▌1. Phil Weaver (R)
▌2. Glenn Cunningham (R)
▌3. Lawrence Brock (D)
▌4. Donald McGinley (D)

==== Nevada ====
▌At-large. Walter S. Baring Jr. (D)

==== New Hampshire ====
▌1. Chester Earl Merrow (R)
▌2. Perkins Bass (R)

==== New Jersey ====
▌1. William T. Cahill (R)
▌2. Milton W. Glenn (R)
▌3. James C. Auchincloss (R)
▌4. Frank Thompson (D)
▌5. Peter Frelinghuysen Jr. (R)
▌6. Florence P. Dwyer (R)
▌7. William B. Widnall (R)
▌8. Gordon Canfield (R)
▌9. Frank C. Osmers Jr. (R)
▌10. Peter W. Rodino (D)
▌11. Hugh Joseph Addonizio (D)
▌12. George M. Wallhauser (R)
▌13. Cornelius Gallagher (D)
▌14. Dominick V. Daniels (D)

==== New Mexico ====
▌At-large. Thomas G. Morris (D)
▌At-large. Joseph Montoya (D)

==== New York ====
▌1. Stuyvesant Wainwright (R)
▌2. Steven Derounian (R)
▌3. Frank J. Becker (R)
▌4. Seymour Halpern (R)
▌5. Albert H. Bosch (R), until December 31, 1960
▌6. Lester Holtzman (D)
▌7. James J. Delaney (D)
▌8. Victor Anfuso (D)
▌9. Eugene J. Keogh (D)
▌10. Edna F. Kelly (D)
▌11. Emanuel Celler (D)
▌12. Francis E. Dorn (R)
▌13. Abraham J. Multer (D)
▌14. John J. Rooney (D)
▌15. John H. Ray (R)
▌16. Adam Clayton Powell Jr. (D)
▌17. John Lindsay (R)
▌18. Alfred E. Santangelo (D)
▌19. Leonard Farbstein (D)
▌20. Ludwig Teller (D)
▌21. Herbert Zelenko (D)
▌22. James C. Healey (D)
▌23. Isidore Dollinger (D), until December 31, 1959

▌Jacob H. Gilbert (D), from March 8, 1960

▌24. Charles A. Buckley (D)
▌25. Paul A. Fino (R)
▌26. Edwin B. Dooley (R)
▌27. Robert R. Barry (R)
▌28. Katharine St. George (R)
▌29. J. Ernest Wharton (R)
▌30. Leo W. O'Brien (D)
▌31. Dean P. Taylor (R)
▌32. Samuel S. Stratton (D)
▌33. Clarence E. Kilburn (R)
▌34. Alexander Pirnie (R)
▌35. R. Walter Riehlman (R)
▌36. John Taber (R)
▌37. Howard W. Robison (R)
▌38. Jessica M. Weis (R)
▌39. Harold C. Ostertag (R)
▌40. William E. Miller (R)
▌41. Thaddeus J. Dulski (D)
▌42. John R. Pillion (R)
▌43. Daniel A. Reed (R), until February 19, 1959

▌Charles Goodell (R), from May 26, 1959

==== North Carolina ====
▌1. Herbert Covington Bonner (D)
▌2. Lawrence H. Fountain (D)
▌3. Graham A. Barden (D)
▌4. Harold D. Cooley (D)
▌5. Ralph James Scott (D)
▌6. Carl T. Durham (D)
▌7. Alton Lennon (D)
▌8. Alvin Paul Kitchin (D)
▌9. Hugh Quincy Alexander (D)
▌10. Charles R. Jonas (R)
▌11. Basil Lee Whitener (D)
▌12. David McKee Hall (D), until January 29, 1960

▌Roy A. Taylor (D), from June 25, 1960

==== North Dakota ====
▌At-large. Quentin Burdick (D-NPL), until August 8, 1960
▌At-large. Don L. Short (R)

==== Ohio ====
▌1. Gordon H. Scherer (R)
▌2. William E. Hess (R)
▌3. Paul F. Schenck (R)
▌4. William Moore McCulloch (R)
▌5. Del Latta (R)
▌6. James G. Polk (D), until April 28, 1959

▌Ward Miller (R), from November 8, 1960

▌7. Clarence J. Brown (R)
▌8. Jackson Edward Betts (R)
▌9. Thomas L. Ashley (D)
▌10. Walter H. Moeller (D)
▌11. Robert E. Cook (D)
▌12. Samuel L. Devine (R)
▌13. Albert David Baumhart Jr. (R)
▌14. William Hanes Ayres (R)
▌15. John E. Henderson (R)
▌16. Frank T. Bow (R)
▌17. Robert W. Levering (D)
▌18. Wayne Hays (D)
▌19. Michael J. Kirwan (D)
▌20. Michael A. Feighan (D)
▌21. Charles Vanik (D)
▌22. Frances P. Bolton (R)
▌23. William Edwin Minshall Jr. (R)

==== Oklahoma ====
▌1. Page Belcher (R)
▌2. Ed Edmondson (D)
▌3. Carl Albert (D)
▌4. Tom Steed (D)
▌5. John Jarman (D)
▌6. Toby Morris (D)

==== Oregon ====
▌1. A. Walter Norblad (R)
▌2. Al Ullman (D)
▌3. Edith Green (D)
▌4. Charles O. Porter (D)

==== Pennsylvania ====
▌1. William A. Barrett (D)
▌2. Kathryn E. Granahan (D)
▌3. James A. Byrne (D)
▌4. Robert N. C. Nix Sr. (D)
▌5. William J. Green Jr. (D)
▌6. Herman Toll (D)
▌7. William H. Milliken Jr. (R)
▌8. Willard S. Curtin (R)
▌9. Paul B. Dague (R)
▌10. Stanley A. Prokop (D)
▌11. Dan Flood (D)
▌12. Ivor D. Fenton (R)
▌13. John A. Lafore Jr. (R)
▌14. George M. Rhodes (D)
▌15. Francis E. Walter (D)
▌16. Walter M. Mumma (R)
▌17. Alvin Bush (R), until November 5, 1959

▌Herman T. Schneebeli (R), from April 26, 1960

▌18. Richard M. Simpson (R), until January 7, 1960

▌Douglas Hemphill Elliott (R), April 26, 1960 – June 19, 1960
▌J. Irving Whalley (R), from November 8, 1960

▌19. James M. Quigley (D)
▌20. James E. Van Zandt (R)
▌21. John Herman Dent (D)
▌22. John P. Saylor (R)
▌23. Leon H. Gavin (R)
▌24. Carroll D. Kearns (R)
▌25. Frank M. Clark (D)
▌26. Thomas E. Morgan (D)
▌27. James G. Fulton (R)
▌28. William S. Moorhead (D)
▌29. Robert J. Corbett (R)
▌30. Elmer J. Holland (D)

==== Rhode Island ====
▌1. Aime Forand (D)
▌2. John E. Fogarty (D)

==== South Carolina ====
▌1. L. Mendel Rivers (D)
▌2. John J. Riley (D)
▌3. William Jennings Bryan Dorn (D)
▌4. Robert T. Ashmore (D)
▌5. Robert W. Hemphill (D)
▌6. John L. McMillan (D)

==== South Dakota ====
▌1. George McGovern (D)
▌2. E. Y. Berry (R)

==== Tennessee ====
▌1. B. Carroll Reece (R)
▌2. Howard Baker Sr. (R)
▌3. James B. Frazier Jr. (D)
▌4. Joe L. Evins (D)
▌5. J. Carlton Loser (D)
▌6. Ross Bass (D)
▌7. Tom J. Murray (D)
▌8. Fats Everett (D)
▌9. Clifford Davis (D)

==== Texas ====
▌1. Wright Patman (D)
▌2. Jack Brooks (D)
▌3. Lindley Beckworth (D)
▌4. Sam Rayburn (D)
▌5. Bruce Alger (R)
▌6. Olin E. Teague (D)
▌7. John Dowdy (D)
▌8. Albert Thomas (D)
▌9. Clark W. Thompson (D)
▌10. Homer Thornberry (D)
▌11. William R. Poage (D)
▌12. Jim Wright (D)
▌13. Frank N. Ikard (D)
▌14. John Andrew Young (D)
▌15. Joe M. Kilgore (D)
▌16. J. T. Rutherford (D)
▌17. Omar Burleson (D)
▌18. Walter E. Rogers (D)
▌19. George H. Mahon (D)
▌20. Paul J. Kilday (D)
▌21. O. C. Fisher (D)
▌22. Robert R. Casey (D)

==== Utah ====
▌1. Henry Aldous Dixon (R)
▌2. David S. King (D)

==== Vermont ====
▌At-large. William H. Meyer (D)

==== Virginia ====
▌1. Thomas N. Downing (D)
▌2. Porter Hardy Jr. (D)
▌3. J. Vaughan Gary (D)
▌4. Watkins Abbitt (D)
▌5. William M. Tuck (D)
▌6. Richard H. Poff (R)
▌7. Burr Harrison (D)
▌8. Howard W. Smith (D)
▌9. W. Pat Jennings (D)
▌10. Joel Broyhill (R)

==== Washington ====
▌1. Thomas Pelly (R)
▌2. Jack Westland (R)
▌3. Russell V. Mack (R), until March 28, 1960

▌Julia Butler Hansen (D), from November 8, 1960

▌4. Catherine Dean May (R)
▌5. Walt Horan (R)
▌6. Thor C. Tollefson (R)
▌7. Don Magnuson (D)

==== West Virginia ====
▌1. Arch A. Moore Jr. (R)
▌2. Harley Orrin Staggers (D)
▌3. Cleveland M. Bailey (D)
▌4. Ken Hechler (D)
▌5. Elizabeth Kee (D)
▌6. John M. Slack Jr. (D)

==== Wisconsin ====
▌1. Gerald T. Flynn (D)
▌2. Robert Kastenmeier (D)
▌3. Gardner R. Withrow (R)
▌4. Clement Zablocki (D)
▌5. Henry S. Reuss (D)
▌6. William Van Pelt (R)
▌7. Melvin Laird (R)
▌8. John W. Byrnes (R)
▌9. Lester Johnson (D)
▌10. Alvin O'Konski (R)

==== Wyoming ====
▌At-large. Keith Thomson (R), until December 9, 1960

==== Non-voting members ====
▌Hawaii Territory. John A. Burns (D), until August 21, 1959
▌Puerto Rico. Antonio Fernós-Isern (PPD)

House majority leaders

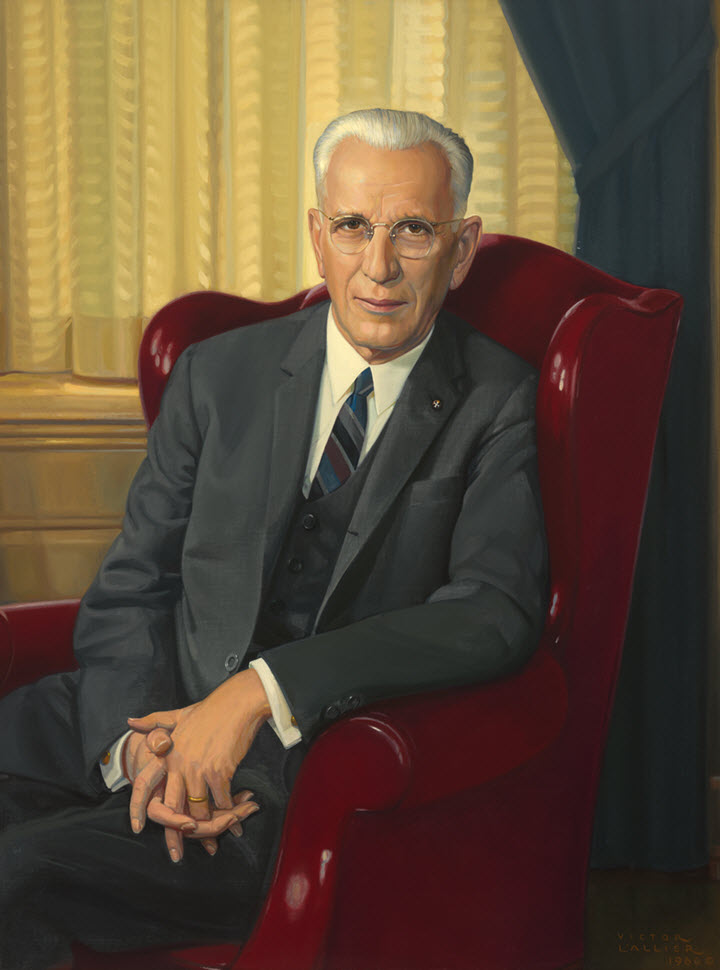
Democratic Leader
John W. McCormack

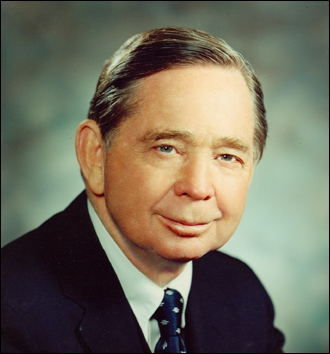
Democratic Whip
Carl Albert

House minority leaders

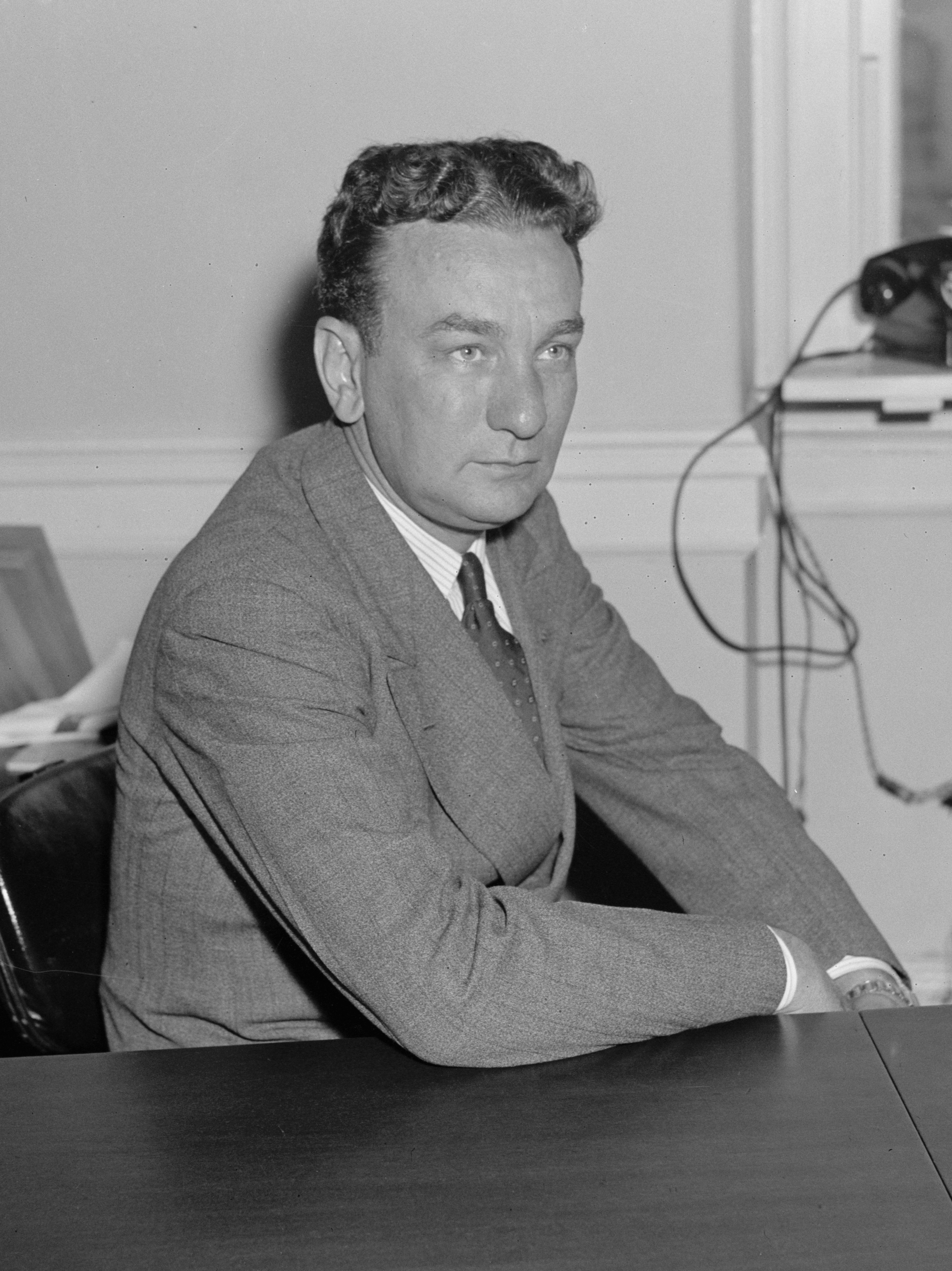
Republican Leader
Charles A. Halleck

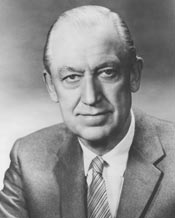
Republican Whip
Leslie C. Arends

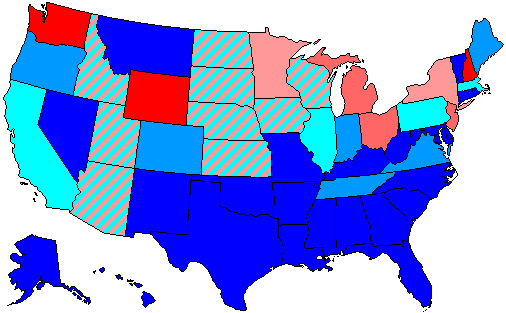
House seats by party holding plurality in state: 80+% Republican / 80+% Democratic; 60+% to 80% Republican / 60+% to 80% Democratic; up to 60% Republican / up to 60% Democratic

== Changes in membership ==
=== Senate ===
Senate changes
State (class)	Vacated by	Reason for change	Successor	Date of successor's formal installation (Note: When seated or oath administered, not necessarily when service began.)
Hawaii (1)	New seats	Hawaii achieved statehood August 21, 1959.	Hiram Fong (R)	August 21, 1959
Hawaii (3)	New seats	Hawaii achieved statehood August 21, 1959.	Oren E. Long (D)	August 21, 1959
North Dakota (1)	William Langer (R)	Died November 8, 1959.	Norman Brunsdale (R)	November 19, 1959
Oregon (2)	Richard L. Neuberger (D)	Died March 9, 1960	Hall S. Lusk (D)	March 16, 1960
North Dakota (1)	Norman Brunsdale (R)	Successor elected June 28, 1960. Successor qualified August 8, 1960.	Quentin Burdick (D)	August 8, 1960
Missouri (3)	Thomas C. Hennings Jr. (D)	Died September 13, 1960	Edward V. Long (D)	September 23, 1960
Oregon (2)	Hall S. Lusk (D)	Successor elected November 8, 1960	Maurine Neuberger (D)	November 9, 1960
Massachusetts (1)	John F. Kennedy (D)	Resigned December 22, 1960, after being elected President of the United States	Benjamin A. Smith II (D)	December 27, 1960

=== House of Representatives ===
House changes
District	Vacated by	Reason for change	Successor	Date of successor's formal installation
Missouri 4th	George H. Christopher (D)	Died January 23, 1959	William J. Randall (D)	March 3, 1959
New York 43rd	Daniel A. Reed (R)	Died February 19, 1959	Charles Goodell (R)	May 26, 1959
Ohio 6th	James G. Polk (D)	Died April 28, 1959	Ward Miller (R)	November 8, 1960
Hawaii Territory at-large	John A. Burns (D)	Hawaii achieved statehood.	Seat eliminated August 21, 1959	
Hawaii at-large	New seat	Hawaii achieved statehood August 21, 1959	Daniel Inouye (D)	August 21, 1959
Illinois 12th	Charles A. Boyle (D)	Died November 4, 1959	Vacant	Not filled this term
Iowa 4th	Steven V. Carter (D)	Died November 4, 1959	John Henry Kyl (R)	December 15, 1959
Pennsylvania 17th	Alvin Bush (R)	Died November 5, 1959	Herman T. Schneebeli (R)	April 26, 1960
New York 23rd	Isidore Dollinger (D)	Resigned December 31, 1959	Jacob H. Gilbert (D)	March 8, 1960
Pennsylvania 18th	Richard M. Simpson (R)	Died January 7, 1960	Douglas Hemphill Elliott (R)	April 26, 1960
North Carolina 12th	David McKee Hall (D)	Died January 29, 1960	Roy A. Taylor (D)	June 25, 1960
Washington 3rd	Russell V. Mack (R)	Died March 28, 1960	Julia Butler Hansen (D)	November 8, 1960
Pennsylvania 18th	Douglas Hemphill Elliott (R)	Died June 19, 1960	J. Irving Whalley (R)	November 8, 1960
North Dakota at-large	Quentin Burdick (D)	Resigned August 8, 1960, after becoming U.S. Senator	Vacant	Not filled this term
Massachusetts 5th	Edith Nourse Rogers (R)	Died September 10, 1960	Vacant	Not filled this term
Wyoming at-large	Edwin Keith Thomson (R)	Died December 9, 1960	Vacant	Not filled this term
New York 5th	Albert H. Bosch (R)	Resigned December 31, 1960, after being elected judge of Court of Queens County	Vacant	Not filled this term

== Committees ==
Lists of committees and their party leaders for members of the House and Senate committees can be found through the Official Congressional Directory at the bottom of this article. The directory after the pages of terms of service lists committees of the Senate, House (Standing with Subcommittees, Select and Special) and Joint and, after that, House/Senate committee assignments. On the committees section of the House and Senate in the Official Congressional Directory, the committee's members on the first row on the left side shows the chairman of the committee and on the right side shows the ranking member of the committee.

=== Senate ===
- Aeronautical and Space Sciences (Chairman: Lyndon B. Johnson; Ranking Member: Styles Bridges)
- Agriculture and Forestry (Chairman: Allen J. Ellender; Ranking Member: George D. Aiken)
- Appropriations (Chairman: Carl Hayden; Ranking Member: Styles Bridges)
- Armed Services (Chairman: Richard B. Russell; Ranking Member: Leverett Saltonstall)
- Banking and Currency (Chairman: A. Willis Robertson; Ranking Member: Homer Capehart)
- District of Columbia (Chairman: Alan Bible; Ranking Member: J. Glenn Beall)
- Finance (Chairman: Harry F. Byrd; Ranking Member: John J. Williams)
- Foreign Relations (Chairman: J. William Fulbright; Ranking Member: Alexander Wiley)
- Government Operations (Chairman: John Little McClellan; Ranking Member: Karl E. Mundt)
- Interior and Insular Affairs (Chairman: James E. Murray; Ranking Member: Henry Dworshak)
- Interstate and Foreign Commerce (Chairman: Warren G. Magnuson; Ranking Member: Andrew F. Schoeppel)
- Judiciary (Chairman: Warren G. Magnuson; Ranking Member: Alexander Wiley)
- Labor-Management Relations (Select) (Chairman: [data missing]; Ranking Member: [data missing]; Ranking Member: [data missing])
- Labor and Public Welfare (Chairman: J. Lister Hill; Ranking Member: Barry Goldwater)
- National Water Resources (Select) (Chairman: [data missing]; Ranking Member: [data missing])
- Preserve Historical Records of the Senate (Special) (Chairman: [data missing]; Ranking Member: [data missing])
- Post Office and Civil Service (Chairman: Olin D. Johnston; Ranking Member: Frank Carlson)
- Public Works (Chairman: Dennis Chavez; Ranking Member: Francis Case)
- Rules and Administration (Chairman: Thomas C. Hennings; Ranking Member: Carl T. Curtis)
- Small Business (Select) (Chairman: John J. Sparkman)
- Space and Aeronautics (Special) (Chairman: [data missing]; Ranking Member: [data missing])
- Unemployment Problems (Special) (Chairman: [data missing]; Ranking Member: [data missing])
- Whole

=== House of Representatives ===
- Agriculture (Chairman: Harold D. Cooley; Ranking Member: Charles B. Hoeven)
- Appropriations (Chairman: Clarence Cannon; Ranking Member: John Taber)
- Armed Services (Chairman: Carl Vinson; Ranking Member: Leslie C. Arends)
- Banking and Currency (Chairman: Brent Spence; Ranking Member: Clarence E. Kilburn)
- District of Columbia (Chairman: John L. McMillan; Ranking Member: James C. Auchincloss)
- Education and Labor (Chairman: Graham A. Barden; Ranking Member: Carroll D. Kearns)
- Foreign Affairs (Chairman: Thomas E. Morgan; Ranking Member: Robert B. Chiperfield)
- Government Operations (Chairman: William L. Dawson; Ranking Member: Clare E. Hoffman)
- House Administration (Chairman: Omar Burleson; Ranking Member: Paul F. Schenck)
- Interior and Insular Affairs (Chairman: Wayne N. Aspinall; Ranking Member: John P. Saylor)
- Interstate and Foreign Commerce (Chairman: Oren Harris; Ranking Member: John B. Bennett)
  - Subcommittee on Legislative Oversight
- Judiciary (Chairman: Emanuel Celler; Ranking Member: William M. McCulloch)
- Merchant Marine and Fisheries (Chairman: Herbert C. Bonner; Ranking Member: Thor C. Tollefson)
- Post Office and Civil Service (Chairman: Tom J. Murray; Ranking Member: Edward H. Rees)
- Public Works (Chairman: Charles A. Buckley; Ranking Member: James C. Auchincloss)
- Rules (Chairman: Howard W. Smith; Ranking Member: Leo E. Allen)
- Science and Astronautics (Chairman: Overton Brooks; Ranking Member: Joseph W. Martin Jr.)
- Small Business (Select) (Chairman: Wright Patman)
- Standards of Official Conduct
- Un-American Activities (Chairman: Francis E. Walter; Ranking Member: Donald L. Jackson)
- Veterans' Affairs (Chairman: Olin E. Teague; Ranking Member: Edith Nourse Rogers)
- Ways and Means (Chairman: Wilbur D. Mills; Ranking Member: Richard M. Simpson)
- Whole

=== Joint committees ===
- Atomic Energy (Chairman: Sen. Clinton P. Anderson; Vice Chairman: Rep. Carl T. Durham)
- Conditions of Indian Tribes (Special)
- Construction of a Building for a Museum of History and Technology for the Smithsonian
- Defense Production (Chairman: Rep. Paul Brown; Vice Chairman: Sen. Homer Capehart)
- Disposition of Executive Papers
- Economic
- Immigration and Nationality Policy (Chairman: Vacant; Vice Chairman: Vacant)
- Legislative Budget
- The Library (Chairman: Sen. Theodore F. Green; Vice Chairman: Rep. Omar Burleson)
- Navajo-Hopi Indian Administration
- Printing (Chairman: Sen. Carl Hayden; Vice Chairman: Rep. Omar Burleson)
- Reduction of Nonessential Federal Expenditures (Chairman: Sen. Harry F. Byrd; Vice Chairman: Rep. Clarence Cannon)
- Taxation (Chairman: Rep. Wilbur D. Mills; Vice Chairman: Sen. Harry F. Byrd)
- Washington (DC) Metropolitan Problems

== Employees ==
=== Legislative branch agency directors ===
- Architect of the Capitol: J. George Stewart
- Attending Physician of the United States Congress: George Calver
- Comptroller General of the United States: Joseph Campbell
- Librarian of Congress: Lawrence Quincy Mumford
- Public Printer of the United States: Raymond Blattenberger

=== Senate ===
- Chaplain: Frederick Brown Harris, Methodist
- Parliamentarian: Charles Watkins
- Secretary: Felton McLellan Johnston
- Librarian: Richard D. Hupman
- Secretary for the Majority: Robert G. Baker
- Secretary for the Minority: J. Mark Trice
- Sergeant at Arms: Joseph C. Duke

=== House of Representatives ===
- Clerk: Ralph R. Roberts
- Doorkeeper: William Mosley "Fishbait" Miller
- Parliamentarian: Lewis Deschler
- Postmaster: H. H. Morris
- Reading Clerks: George J. Maurer (D) and Joe Bartlett (R)
- Sergeant at Arms: Zeake W. Johnson Jr.
- Chaplain: Bernard Braskamp - Presbyterian

== See also ==
- 1958 United States elections (elections leading to this Congress)
  - 1958 United States Senate elections
  - 1958 United States House of Representatives elections
- 1960 United States elections (elections during this Congress, leading to the next Congress)
  - 1960 United States presidential election
  - 1960 United States Senate elections
  - 1960 United States House of Representatives elections
