= 1959 United States House of Representatives elections =

There were four elections to the United States House of Representatives in 1959, all during the 86th United States Congress. Three of them were special elections to fill vacancies, and the fourth was to fill a seat for the new state of Hawaii. There were no special elections to the 85th Congress in 1959.

== Special elections ==
Elections are listed by date and district.

District	Incumbent			This race	
District	Member	Party	First elected	Results	Candidates
Missouri 4	George H. Christopher	Democratic	1948	Incumbent died January 23, 1959. New member elected March 3, 1959. Democratic hold.	▌ ✓ William J. Randall (Democratic) 57.99%; ▌William McKee (Republican) 42.01%
New York 43	Daniel A. Reed	Republican	1918	Incumbent died February 19, 1959; New member elected May 26, 1959. Republican hold.	▌ ✓ Charles Goodell (Republican) 65.02%; ▌Robert E. McCaffrey (Democratic) 33.75%; ▌John R. Steinbroner (Liberal) 1.23%
Iowa 4	Steven V. Carter	Democratic	1958	Incumbent died November 4, 1959; New member elected December 15, 1959. Republican gain.	▌ ✓ John Henry Kyl (Republican) 52.33%; ▌C. Edwin Gilmour (Democratic) 47.68%

== Hawaii ==
In 1959, Hawaii became a state and elected one new member of the House, Democrat Daniel Inouye.

District	Incumbent			This race	
District	Member	Party	First elected	Results	Candidates
Hawaii at-large	None (new state)			New seat. New member elected August 21, 1959. Democratic gain.	▌ ✓ Daniel Inouye (Democratic) 68.64%; ▌Charles H. Silva (Republican) 31.37%
