= 1959 Missouri's 4th congressional district special election =

- March 3, 1959

Missouri's 4th congressional district
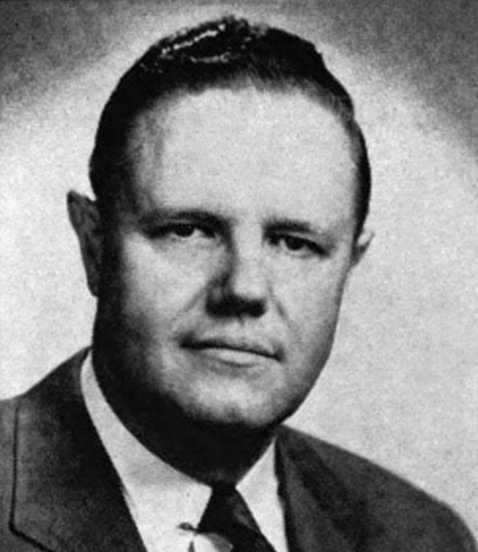
Candidate	William J. Randall	William McKee
Party	Democratic	Republican
Popular vote	27,171	20,411
Percentage	57.99%	42.01%
U.S. Representative before election
Vacant
Elected U.S. Representative
William J. Randall
Democratic

The 1959 Missouri's 4th congressional district special election was held on March 3, 1959, and was won by Jackson County Judge William J. Randall, the Democratic nominee.

On January 23, 1959, Democratic Congressman George H. Christopher died, causing a vacancy. On February 2, Governor James Blair issued a proclamation for the special election, which he deliberately scheduled with the Kansas City municipal election primary. The parties' nominees were picked by the local congressional party committees.

== Democratic nomination ==
The Democratic convention to select the party's nominee for the special election took place on February 5, 1959. Going into the convention, two party leaders—Independence Mayor William Sermon and Jackson County Clerk Ben Nordberg—supported different candidates. At the beginning of the convention, Nordberg favored Robert W. Crawford, an administrative aide to Governor Blair, while Sermon backed Delton W. Houtchens, an attorney from Clinton. Marvin Durst, an aide to Congressman Christopher, had support from some of the delegates from the district's rural counties. When no candidate received a majority on the first ballot, Houtchens dropped out and Sermon switched his support to Durst, which produced a 22-22 deadlock for the following six ballots. On the eighth ballot, Jackson County Judge William J. Randall emerged as a compromise candidate and was nominated unanimously.

== Republican nomination ==
The Republican convention took place on February 6, and resulted in the unanimous nomination of William R. McKee, a lumber dealer from Lee's Summit.

== General election ==
=== Campaign ===
Following the nominations, a contested general election ensued. Though Christopher had won 64% of the vote in 1958, Republicans launched an effort to flip the seat. President Dwight Eisenhower endorsed McKee and in the closing days of the campaign, Congressman Richard M. Simpson, the chair of the Republican Congressional Campaign Committee, coordinated the McKee campaign's efforts. Randall, however, was seen as the frontrunner, and benefited from the support of the local Democratic machine, the AFL-CIO, and the National Farmers Organization. Randall ultimately won by a wide margin, but significantly reduced from Christoper's margin the previous year.

=== Results ===
1959 Missouri's 4th congressional district special election
Party	Candidate	Votes	%
Democratic	William J. Randall	28,171	57.99%
Republican	William McKee	20,411	42.01%
Majority		7,760	15.97%
Total votes		48,582	100.00%
Democratic hold			
