= Bert Bandstra =

American politician (1922–1995)

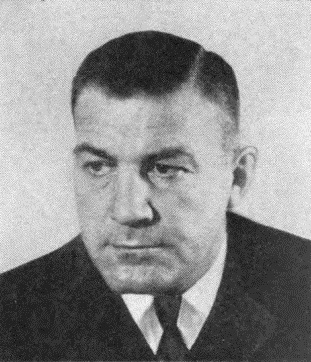

Member of the U.S. House of Representatives from Iowa's 4th district
- In office January 3, 1965 – January 3, 1967
- Preceded by: John Henry Kyl
- Succeeded by: John Henry Kyl

Personal details
- Born: January 25, 1922 Monroe County, Iowa, U.S.
- Died: October 23, 1995 (aged 73) Pella, Iowa, U.S.
- Party: Democratic
- Education: University of Michigan Law School

Military service
- Allegiance: United States
- Branch/service: United States Navy
- Years of service: 1942–1945

Bert Andrew Bandstra (January 25, 1922 – October 23, 1995) served one term as a Democratic U.S. Representative from south central Iowa, winning election in 1964 but losing elections in 1966 and 1968.

Born in Monroe County, Iowa to Dutch immigrants, Bandstra attended New Sharon High School. He served in the United States Navy from 1942 to 1945, then returned to Iowa. He graduated in 1950 from Central College in Pella, Iowa, then received a law degree from the University of Michigan Law School in Ann Arbor, Michigan in 1953. Returning to Iowa for private practice, he served as County Attorney for Marion County, Iowa from 1955 to 1959. He then served on the staff of Democratic United States Representative Neal Edward Smith of Iowa from 1959 to 1964.

In 1964, as part of a Democratic landslide, Bandstra was elected to represent Iowa's 4th congressional district in the U.S. House of Representatives. defeating incumbent Republican John Henry Kyl.

In 1965 Bandstra proposed a resolution to alter the national anthem.

Bandstra served only one term. Kyl regained his seat from Bandstra in 1966, and held off another challenge from Bandstra in 1968.

Bandstra died on October 23, 1995, in Pella.

U.S. House of Representatives
Preceded by John H. Kyl	Member of the U.S. House of Representatives from Iowa's 4th congressional district 1965–1967	Succeeded by John H. Kyl
