= Iowa's 4th congressional district =

U.S. House district for Iowa

Coordinates: 42°37′43″N 94°38′42″W

- Interactive map of district boundaries since January 3, 2023
- Representative: Randy Feenstra; R–Hull
- Distribution: 50.58% urban; 49.42% rural
- Population (2025): 798,206
- Median household income: $72,389
- Ethnicity: 82.6% White; 9.6% Hispanic; 3.0% Two or more races; 2.0% Black; 1.9% Asian; 0.9% other
- Cook PVI: R+15

Iowa's 4th congressional district is a congressional district in the U.S. state of Iowa that covers the western border of the state, including Sioux City and Council Bluffs. Up north, it extends eastwards into Ames, Boone, Fort Dodge, and Marshalltown. It has been represented by Republican Randy Feenstra since 2021, who defeated longtime incumbent Steve King in 2020. With a Cook Partisan Voting Index rating of R+15, and following the 2026 midterm elections, it is the only Republican district in Iowa.

== History ==
Since the 1880s, there have been major changes in the location or nature of Iowa's 4th Congressional District. From 1886 until 1941, the district was made up of largely rural counties in northeastern Iowa, including the easternmost five counties in the northernmost two rows (and, during the 1930s, Buchanan and Delaware counties from the third row). During that era, the district included areas from Mason City east to the Mississippi River.

In 1941, Iowa's 5th Congressional District (made up of rural counties in southern Iowa) was renumbered as Iowa's 4th Congressional District, and counties in the old 4th District were placed in the 3rd District and the 2nd District. (In 1942, 4th District incumbent, Henry O. Talle, would defeat the 2nd District incumbent William S. Jacobsen in the new 2nd Congressional District). From 1941 until 1960 the 4th Congressional District included the central five counties of each of the two southernmost tiers, plus four counties between Des Moines and Iowa City (Mahaska, Keokuk, Jasper and Poweshiek). 5th District incumbent Republican U.S. Representative Karl M. LeCompte was reelected in the reconfigured 4th District in 1942, and was reelected in the next seven races. In 1958, when LeCompte did not run for reelection, Democrat Steven V. Carter defeated Republican John Kyl. A recurrence of cancer would claim Carter's life before the end of his only term, and Kyl won the special election and next general election. In 1961 the 4th Congressional District was expanded to include five central Iowa counties – Warren, Marion, Marshall, Tama and Benton – but retained its rural character. Kyl held this seat until he was swept out in the massive Democratic landslide of 1964. However, he regained his old seat in 1966, and was reelected two more times.

The rural character of the district was changed when most of its territory was merged with the Des Moines-based 5th District of Democratic incumbent Neal Smith after the 1970 census. Polk County (home to Des Moines and most of its suburbs) was added, while most of the rural counties were taken out. Smith defeated Kyl in the 1972 congressional election. The district became even less rural in 1981, when Story County (home of Ames) was added, and other rural counties were taken out. The district was significantly altered after the 1990 census, when it was reconfigured to take in the southwest quadrant of the state from Des Moines to Council Bluffs. Smith was reelected in 1992, but defeated in 1994 by Republican Greg Ganske.

The 2001 remap made the 4th district a north-central Iowa district. It could not be said to be the successor of any of the previous districts. It was a primarily rural district, though it included Ames and Mason City. It did not include any of the state's nine largest cities, and only four of the twenty largest Iowa cities. The plan went into effect in 2003 for the 108th U.S. Congress. The 5th's incumbent congressman, Tom Latham, had his home in Alexander drawn into the 4th, and was elected from this district five times.

For the 2012 elections, the Iowa Legislature passed a plan that went into effect in 2013 for the 113th U.S. Congress. The district now covers the northwest corner of the state, and essentially merged the northern half of the old 5th District with the western third of the old 4th. The new map placed Latham and 5th District incumbent Steve King in the same district. Although the new 4th was geographically more Latham's district, he opted to move to the redrawn 3rd District, leaving King to take the seat. The current 4th district is by far the most conservative in Iowa – it was the only one of the state's four districts to be won by Mitt Romney in 2012, and Donald Trump carried it by over 25 points in 2016. Additionally, King was the only Republican House member from Iowa during the 116th Congress, although he faced a close race in 2018 due to his long history of controversial comments.

In June 2020, Steve King was defeated in the Republican House primary by challenger Randy Feenstra.

== Recent election results from statewide races ==
Year	Office	Results
2008	President	McCain 50–47%
2012	President	Romney 55–45%
2016	President	Trump 60–33%
2016	Senate	Grassley 67–28%
2018	Governor	Reynolds 59–39%
2018	Secretary of State	Pate 61–37%
2018	Auditor	Mosiman 56–42%
2018	Treasurer	Davis 51–47%
2020	President	Trump 62–36%
2020	Senate	Ernst 60–37%
2022	Senate	Grassley 66–34%
2022	Governor	Reynolds 69–29%
2022	Secretary of State	Pate 69–31%
2022	Auditor	Halbur 60–40%
2022	Treasurer	Smith 61–39%
2022	Attorney General	Bird 61–39%
2024	President	Trump 65–33%
2026	Senate	Hinson 55–42%
2026	Governor	Lahn 54–46%

== Composition ==
The 4th district includes the entirety of the following counties:

#	County	Seat	Population
9	Audubon	Audubon	5,534
15	Boone	Boone	26,590
21	Buena Vista	Storm Lake	20,567
25	Calhoun	Rockwell City	9,763
27	Carroll	Carroll	20,522
35	Cherokee	Cherokee	11,605
41	Clay	Spencer	16,511
47	Crawford	Denison	16,013
59	Dickinson	Spirit Lake	18,056
63	Emmet	Estherville	9,229
69	Franklin	Hampton	9,875
71	Fremont	Sidney	6,458
79	Hamilton	Webster City	14,729
81	Hancock	Garner	10,615
85	Harrison	Logan	14,670
91	Humboldt	Dakota City	9,500
93	Ida	Ida Grove	6,833
109	Kossuth	Algona	14,396
119	Lyon	Rock Rapids	12,324
127	Marshall	Marshalltown	40,014
129	Mills	Glenwood	14,633
133	Monona	Onawa	8,493
141	O'Brien	Primghar	14,012
143	Osceola	Sibley	5,978
147	Palo Alto	Emmetsburg	8,810
149	Plymouth	Le Mars	25,722
151	Pocahontas	Pocahontas	6,976
155	Pottawattamie	Council Bluffs	93,179
161	Sac	Sac City	9,686
165	Shelby	Harlan	11,806
167	Sioux	Orange City	35,246
169	Story	Nevada	98,566
187	Webster	Fort Dodge	36,485
189	Winnebago	Forest City	10,571
193	Woodbury	Sioux City	105,951
197	Wright	Clarion	12,656

== List of members representing the district ==
Member	Party	Term	Cong ress	Electoral history	Location
District created March 4, 1863
Josiah B. Grinnell (Grinnell)	Republican	March 4, 1863 – March 3, 1867	38th 39th	Elected in 1862. Re-elected in 1864. Lost renomination.	1863–1873 [data missing]
William Loughridge (Oskaloosa)	Republican	March 4, 1867 – March 3, 1871	40th 41st	Elected in 1866. Re-elected in 1868. Lost renomination.	1863–1873 [data missing]
Madison M. Walden (Centerville)	Republican	March 4, 1871 – March 3, 1873	42nd	Elected in 1870. Lost renomination.	1863–1873 [data missing]
Henry O. Pratt (Charles City)	Republican	March 4, 1873 – March 3, 1877	43rd 44th	Elected in 1872. Re-elected in 1874. Retired.	1873–1883 [data missing]
Nathaniel C. Deering (Osage)	Republican	March 4, 1877 – March 3, 1883	45th 46th 47th	Elected in 1876. Re-elected in 1878. Re-elected in 1880. Retired.	1873–1883 [data missing]
Luman H. Weller (Nashua)	Greenback	March 4, 1883 – March 3, 1885	48th	Elected in 1882. Lost re-election.	1883–1887; Allamakee, Chickasaw, Clayton, Fayette, Floyd, Howard, Mitchell, and Winneshiek counties
William E. Fuller (West Union)	Republican	March 4, 1885 – March 3, 1889	49th 50th	Elected in 1884. Re-elected in 1886. Lost renomination.	1883–1887; Allamakee, Chickasaw, Clayton, Fayette, Floyd, Howard, Mitchell, and Winneshiek counties
William E. Fuller (West Union)	Republican	March 4, 1885 – March 3, 1889	49th 50th	Elected in 1884. Re-elected in 1886. Lost renomination.	1887–1933; Allamakee, Cerro Gordo, Chickasaw, Clayton, Fayette, Floyd, Howard, Mitchell, Winneshiek, and Worth counties
Joseph H. Sweney (Osage)	Republican	March 4, 1889 – March 3, 1891	51st	Elected in 1888. Lost re-election.	1887–1933; Allamakee, Cerro Gordo, Chickasaw, Clayton, Fayette, Floyd, Howard, Mitchell, Winneshiek, and Worth counties
Walter H. Butler (West Union)	Democratic	March 4, 1891 – March 3, 1893	52nd	Elected in 1890. Lost re-election.	1887–1933; Allamakee, Cerro Gordo, Chickasaw, Clayton, Fayette, Floyd, Howard, Mitchell, Winneshiek, and Worth counties
Thomas Updegraff (McGregor)	Republican	March 4, 1893 – March 3, 1899	53rd 54th 55th	Elected in 1892. Re-elected in 1894. Re-elected in 1896. Lost renomination.	1887–1933; Allamakee, Cerro Gordo, Chickasaw, Clayton, Fayette, Floyd, Howard, Mitchell, Winneshiek, and Worth counties
Gilbert N. Haugen (Northwood)	Republican	March 4, 1899 – March 3, 1933	56th 57th 58th 59th 60th 61st 62nd 63rd 64th 65th 66th 67th 68th 69th 70th 71st 72nd	Elected in 1898. Re-elected in 1900. Re-elected in 1902. Re-elected in 1904. Re-elected in 1906. Re-elected in 1908. Re-elected in 1910. Re-elected in 1912. Re-elected in 1914. Re-elected in 1916. Re-elected in 1918. Re-elected in 1920. Re-elected in 1922. Re-elected in 1924. Re-elected in 1926. Re-elected in 1928. Re-elected in 1930. Lost re-election.	1887–1933; Allamakee, Cerro Gordo, Chickasaw, Clayton, Fayette, Floyd, Howard, Mitchell, Winneshiek, and Worth counties
Fred Biermann (Decorah)	Democratic	March 4, 1933 – January 3, 1939	73rd 74th 75th	Elected in 1932. Re-elected in 1934. Re-elected in 1936. Lost re-election.	1933–1943 [data missing]
Henry O. Talle (Decorah)	Republican	January 3, 1939 – January 3, 1943	76th 77th	Elected in 1938. Re-elected in 1940. Redistricted to the 2nd district.	1933–1943 [data missing]
Karl M. LeCompte (Corydon)	Republican	January 3, 1943 – January 3, 1959	78th 79th 80th 81st 82nd 83rd 84th 85th	Redistricted from the 5th district and re-elected in 1942. Re-elected in 1944. Re-elected in 1946. Re-elected in 1948. Re-elected in 1950. Re-elected in 1952. Re-elected in 1954. Re-elected in 1956. Retired.	1943–1963 [data missing]
Steven V. Carter (Leon)	Democratic	January 3, 1959 – November 4, 1959	86th	Elected in 1958. Died.	1943–1963 [data missing]
Vacant		November 4, 1959 – December 15, 1959	86th		1943–1963 [data missing]
John Kyl (Bloomfield)	Republican	December 15, 1959 – January 3, 1965	86th 87th 88th	Elected to finish Carter's term. Re-elected in 1960. Re-elected in 1962. Lost re-election.	1943–1963 [data missing]
John Kyl (Bloomfield)	Republican	December 15, 1959 – January 3, 1965	86th 87th 88th	Elected to finish Carter's term. Re-elected in 1960. Re-elected in 1962. Lost re-election.	1963–1973 [data missing]
Bert Bandstra (Pella)	Democratic	January 3, 1965 – January 3, 1967	89th	Elected in 1964. Lost re-election.	1963–1973 [data missing]
John Kyl (Bloomfield)	Republican	January 3, 1967 – January 3, 1973	90th 91st 92nd	Elected in 1966. Re-elected in 1968. Re-elected in 1970. Lost re-election.	1963–1973 [data missing]
Neal Smith (Altoona)	Democratic	January 3, 1973 – January 3, 1995	93rd 94th 95th 96th 97th 98th 99th 100th 101st 102nd 103rd	Redistricted from the 5th district and re-elected in 1972. Re-elected in 1974. Re-elected in 1976. Re-elected in 1978. Re-elected in 1980. Re-elected in 1982. Re-elected in 1984. Re-elected in 1986. Re-elected in 1988. Re-elected in 1990. Re-elected in 1992. Lost re-election.	1973–1983 [data missing]
Neal Smith (Altoona)	Democratic	January 3, 1973 – January 3, 1995	93rd 94th 95th 96th 97th 98th 99th 100th 101st 102nd 103rd	Redistricted from the 5th district and re-elected in 1972. Re-elected in 1974. Re-elected in 1976. Re-elected in 1978. Re-elected in 1980. Re-elected in 1982. Re-elected in 1984. Re-elected in 1986. Re-elected in 1988. Re-elected in 1990. Re-elected in 1992. Lost re-election.	1983–1993 [data missing]
Neal Smith (Altoona)	Democratic	January 3, 1973 – January 3, 1995	93rd 94th 95th 96th 97th 98th 99th 100th 101st 102nd 103rd	Redistricted from the 5th district and re-elected in 1972. Re-elected in 1974. Re-elected in 1976. Re-elected in 1978. Re-elected in 1980. Re-elected in 1982. Re-elected in 1984. Re-elected in 1986. Re-elected in 1988. Re-elected in 1990. Re-elected in 1992. Lost re-election.	1993–2003 [data missing]
Greg Ganske (Des Moines)	Republican	January 3, 1995 – January 3, 2003	104th 105th 106th 107th	Elected in 1994. Re-elected in 1996. Re-elected in 1998. Re-elected in 2000. Redistricted to the 3rd district but retired to run for U.S. Senator.	1993–2003 [data missing]
Tom Latham (Ames)	Republican	January 3, 2003 – January 3, 2013	108th 109th 110th 111th 112th	Redistricted from the 5th district and re-elected in 2002. Re-elected in 2004. Re-elected in 2006. Re-elected in 2008. Re-elected in 2010. Redistricted to the 3rd district.	2003–2013
Steve King (Kiron)	Republican	January 3, 2013 – January 3, 2021	113th 114th 115th 116th	Redistricted from the 5th district and re-elected in 2012. Re-elected in 2014. Re-elected in 2016. Re-elected in 2018. Lost renomination.	2013–2023
Randy Feenstra (Hull)	Republican	January 3, 2021 – present	117th 118th 119th	Elected in 2020. Re-elected in 2022. Re-elected in 2024. Retired to run for governor of Iowa.	2013–2023
Randy Feenstra (Hull)	Republican	January 3, 2021 – present	117th 118th 119th	Elected in 2020. Re-elected in 2022. Re-elected in 2024. Retired to run for governor of Iowa.	2023–present:
Chris McGowan (Sioux City)	Republican	Assuming office on January 3, 2027		Elected in 2026.	2023–present:

== Historical election results ==
Year	Winner			Second			Percentage
Year	Party affiliation	Candidate	Votes	Party affiliation	Candidate	Votes	Percentage
1920	Republican	Gilbert N. Haugen	53,083	Democratic	Carl Evans	18,104	75%–25%
1922	Republican	Gilbert N. Haugen	32,586	Democratic	A. M. Schanke	24,532	57%–43%
1924	Republican	Gilbert N. Haugen	50,850	Democratic	J. M. Berry	20,636	71%–29%
1926	Republican	Gilbert N. Haugen	30,611	Democratic	Frank E. Howard	20,076	60%–40%
1928	Republican	Gilbert N. Haugen	50,488	Democratic	Erwin Larson	31,968	61%–39%
1930	Republican	Gilbert N. Haugen	29,224	Democratic	Wilbur L. Peck	20,236	59%–41%
1932	Democratic	Fred Biermann	62,598	Republican	Gilbert N. Haugen	42,207	59%–41%
1934	Democratic	Fred Biermann	49,504	Republican	C. A. Benson	43,794	52%–46%
1936	Democratic	Fred Biermann	56,308	Republican	Henry O. Talle	51,805	51%–47%
1938	Republican	Henry O. Talle	48,640	Democratic	Fred Biermann	44,601	52%–48%
1940	Republican	Henry O. Talle	66,691	Democratic	Morgan J. McEnaney	51,558	56%–44%
1942	Republican	Karl M. LeCompte	52,258	Democratic	Thomas L. Curran	28,745	65%–35%
1944	Republican	Karl M. LeCompte	59,658	Democratic	Harold J. Fleck	49,098	55%–45%
1946	Republican	Karl M. LeCompte	43,753	Democratic	A. E. Augustine	31,203	58%–42%
1948	Republican	Karl M. LeCompte	53,384	Democratic	Steven V. Carter	49,894	52%–48%
1950	Republican	Karl M. LeCompte	51,168	Democratic	Steven V. Carter	38,649	57%–43%
1952	Republican	Karl M. LeCompte	73,317	Democratic	Earl E. Glassburner	44,900	62%–38%
1954	Republican	Karl M. LeCompte	49,608	Democratic	Herschel C. Loveless	39,652	56%–44%
1956	Republican	Karl M. LeCompte	58,024	Democratic	Steven V. Carter	56,406	51%–49%
1958	Democratic	Steven V. Carter	42,479	Republican	John Henry Kyl	39,233	52%–48%
1960	Republican	John Henry Kyl	65,016	Democratic	C. Edwin Gilmour	49,918	57%–43%
1962	Republican	John Henry Kyl	65,538	Democratic	Gene W. Glenn	51,810	56%–44%
1964	Democratic	Bert Bandstra	85,518	Republican	John Henry Kyl	73,898	54%–46%
1966	Republican	John Henry Kyl	65,259	Democratic	Bert Bandstra	61,074	52%–48%
1968	Republican	John Henry Kyl	83,259	Democratic	Bert Bandstra	71,134	54%–46%
1970	Republican	John Henry Kyl	59,396	Democratic	Roger Blobaum	49,369	55%–45%
1972	Democratic	Neal Edward Smith	123,431	Republican	John Henry Kyl	85,156	59%–41%
1974	Democratic	Neal Edward Smith	91,755	Republican	Chuck Dick	53,756	61%–35%
1976	Democratic	Neal Edward Smith	145,343	Republican	Charles E. Minor	65,013	69%–31%
1978	Democratic	Neal Edward Smith	88,526	Republican	Charles E. Minor	48,308	65%–35%
1980	Democratic	Neal Edward Smith	117,896	Republican	Donald C. Young	100,335	54%–36%
1982	Democratic	Neal Edward Smith	118,849	Republican	Dave Readinger	60,534	66%–34%
1984	Democratic	Neal Edward Smith	136,922	Republican	Robert R. Lockard	88,717	61%–39%
1986	Democratic	Neal Edward Smith	107,271	Republican	Robert R. Lockard	49,641	68%–32%
1988	Democratic	Neal Edward Smith	157,065	Republican	Paul Lunde	62,056	72%–28%
1990	Democratic	Neal Edward Smith	127,812	unopposed		2,778	98%–2%
1992	Democratic	Neal Edward Smith	158,610	Republican	Paul Lunde	94,045	62%–37%
1994	Republican	Greg Ganske	111,935	Democratic	Neal Smith	98,824	53%–46%
1996	Republican	Greg Ganske	133,419	Democratic	Connie McBurney	119,790	52%–47%
1998	Republican	Greg Ganske	129,942	Democratic	Jon Dvorak	67,550	65%–34%
2000	Republican	Greg Ganske	169,267	Democratic	Michael L. Huston	101,112	61%–37%
2002	Republican	Tom Latham	115,430	Democratic	John Norris	90,784	55%–43%
2004	Republican	Tom Latham	181,294	Democratic	Paul W. Johnson	116,121	61%–39%
2006	Republican	Tom Latham	120,512	Democratic	Selden Spencer	89,994	57%–43%
2008	Republican	Tom Latham	184,529	Democratic	Becky Greenwald	119,927	60%–39%
2010	Republican	Tom Latham	152,588	Democratic	Bill Maske	74,300	64%–31%
2012	Republican	Steve King	200,831	Democratic	Christie Vilsack	168,323	53%–45%
2014	Republican	Steve King	169,141	Democratic	Jim Mowrer	104,873	62%–38%
2016	Republican	Steve King	226,719	Democratic	Kim Weaver	142,993	61%–39%
2018	Republican	Steve King	157,275	Democratic	J. D. Scholten	146,737	50.3%–47.0%
2020	Republican	Randy Feenstra	237,369	Democratic	J. D. Scholten	144,761	62.0%–37.8%

=== 2002 ===
2002 Iowa's 4th congressional district election
Party	Candidate	Votes	%
Republican	Tom Latham*	115,430	54.77
Democratic	John Norris	90,784	43.07
Libertarian	Terry L. Wilson	2,952	1.40
Independent	Jim Hennager	1,544	0.73
No party	Others	64	0.03
Total votes		210,774	100.00
Turnout			
Republican hold			

- Note: Jim Hennager ran on the Earth Federation Party platform on the ballot.

=== 2004 ===
2004 Iowa's 4th congressional district election
Party	Candidate	Votes	%
Republican	Tom Latham*	181,294	60.93
Democratic	Paul W. Johnson	116,121	39.02
No party	Others	151	0.05
Total votes		297,566	100.00
Turnout			
Republican hold			

=== 2006 ===
2006 Iowa's 4th congressional district election
Party	Candidate	Votes	%
Republican	Tom Latham*	121,650	57.19
Democratic	Selden Spencer	90,982	42.77
No party	Others	98	0.05
Total votes		212,730	100.00
Turnout			
Republican hold			

=== 2008 ===
2008 Iowa's 4th congressional district election
Party	Candidate	Votes	%
Republican	Tom Latham*	185,458	60.53
Democratic	Becky Greenwald	120,746	39.41
No party	Others	197	0.06
Total votes		306,401	100.00
Turnout			
Republican hold			

=== 2010 ===
2010 Iowa's 4th congressional district election
Party	Candidate	Votes	%
Republican	Tom Latham*	152,588	65.62
Democratic	Bill Maske	74,300	31.95
Independent	Dan Lensing	5,499	2.37
No party	Others	132	0.06
Total votes		232,519	100.00
Turnout			
Republican hold			

=== 2012 ===
2012 Iowa's 4th congressional district election
Party	Candidate	Votes	%
Republican	Steve King*	200,063	51.69
Democratic	Christie Vilsack	169,470	43.78
Independent	Martin James Monroe	8,124	2.10
No party	Others	226	
Total votes		387,079	100.00
Turnout			
Republican hold			

=== 2014 ===
2014 Iowa's 4th congressional district election
Party	Candidate	Votes	%
Republican	Steve King (incumbent)	169,834	61.6
Democratic	Jim Mowrer	105,504	38.3
Write-ins		295	0.1
Total votes		275,633	100
Republican hold			

=== 2016 ===
2016 Iowa's 4th congressional district election
Party	Candidate	Votes	%
Republican	Steve King (incumbent)	226,719	61.23
Democratic	Kim Weaver	142,993	38.62
Write-ins		547	0.15
Total votes		370,259	100
Republican hold			

=== 2018 ===
Results of the 2018 Iowa's 4th congressional district election

2018 Iowa's 4th congressional district election
Party	Candidate	Votes	%	±%
Republican	Steve King (incumbent)	157,275	50.33	−10.9
Democratic	J. D. Scholten	146,737	46.96	+8.34
Libertarian	Charles Aldrich	6,315	2.02	+2.02
Independent	Edward Peterson	1,940	0.62	+0.62
Write-ins		201	0.06	−0.09
Majority		10,538	3.37	
Turnout		312,468	100	
Republican hold		Swing	–19.24	

=== 2020 ===
Results of the 2020 Iowa's 4th congressional district election

2020 Iowa's 4th congressional district election
Party	Candidate	Votes	%
Republican	Randy Feenstra	237,369	62.0
Democratic	J. D. Scholten	144,761	37.8
Write-in		892	0.2
Total votes		383,022	100.0
Republican hold			

=== 2022 ===
Results of the 2022 Iowa's 4th congressional district election

2022 Iowa's 4th congressional district election
Party	Candidate	Votes	%
Republican	Randy Feenstra (incumbent)	186,467	67.3
Democratic	Ryan Melton	84,230	30.4
Liberty Caucus	Bryan Jack Holder	6,035	2.2
Write-in		276	0.1
Total votes		277,008	100.0
Republican hold			

=== 2024 ===
2024 Iowa's 4th congressional district election
Party	Candidate	Votes	%
Republican	Randy Feenstra (incumbent)	250,522	67.0
Democratic	Ryan Melton	122,175	32.7
Write-in		1,127	0.3
Total votes		373,824	100.0
Republican hold			

== See also ==
- Iowa's congressional districts
- List of United States congressional districts
- Redistricting in the United States
