= William Clay Cole =

American politician (1897–1965)

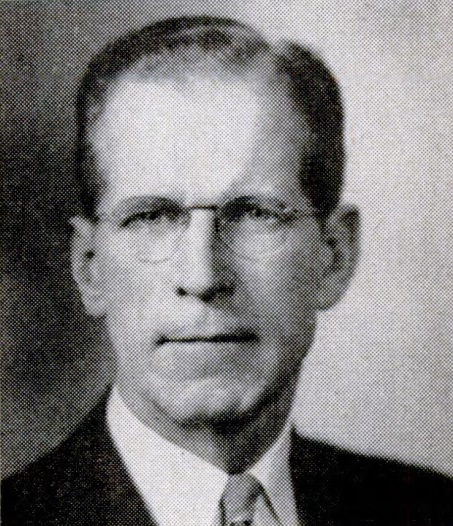

Member of the U.S. House of Representatives from Missouri
- In office January 3, 1943 – January 3, 1949
- Preceded by: Richard M. Duncan
- Succeeded by: Phil J. Welch
- Constituency: 3rd district
- In office January 3, 1953 – January 3, 1955
- Preceded by: Orland K. Armstrong
- Succeeded by: William Raleigh Hull Jr.
- Constituency: 6th district

Member of the Missouri House of Representatives
- In office 1942–1943

Personal details
- Born: August 29, 1897 near Fillmore, Missouri, US
- Died: September 23, 1965 (aged 68) St. Joseph, Missouri, US
- Party: Republican

William Clay Cole (August 29, 1897 – September 23, 1965) was an American politician who served as a Republican representative from Missouri's 3rd congressional district from 1943 to 1949 and Missouri's 6th congressional district from 1953 to 1955.

== Background ==
William Clay Cole was born on August 29, 1897, on a farm near Fillmore, Missouri.

== Career ==
In 1916, Cole was a mounted scout on the Mexican border with the Missouri National Guard during the Pancho Villa Expedition and then served in France for 14 months during World War I.

After the war, he graduated from St. Joseph Law School (which operated under the auspices of the YMCA in St. Joseph, Missouri from 1912 to 1938).

Cole served in the Missouri House of Representatives from 1942 to 1943, after winning a vacant seat in a special election. In 1942, he was elected to the U.S. House, and served 1943 to 1949. He ran unsuccessfully for reelection in 1948. He ran unsuccessfully in 1950, but won again in 1952, serving one term, 1953 to 1955. He ran unsuccessfully for reelection in 1954.

Cole returned to his law practice in St. Joseph and was a member of the federal Board of Veterans Appeals from 1955 to 1960.

== Personal life and death ==
Cole was a member of the Lions Club, Odd Fellows; Elks Club, Moose Club, Brotherhood of Railroad Trainmen, American Legion, and Veterans of Foreign Wars.

William Clay Cole died age 68 on September 23, 1965, in St. Joseph and was buried at Fillmore Cemetery in Fillmore.

See also

William Raleigh Hull Jr.

U.S. House of Representatives
Preceded by Richard M. Duncan	Member of the U.S. House of Representatives from Missouri's 3rd congressional district 1943–1949	Succeeded by Phil J. Welch
Preceded by Orland K. Armstrong	Member of the U.S. House of Representatives from Missouri's 6th congressional district 1953–1955	Succeeded by William Raleigh Hull, Jr.
