= Phil J. Welch =

American politician

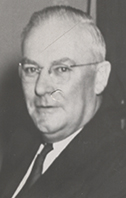

Member of the U.S. House of Representatives from Missouri's 3rd district
- In office January 3, 1949 – January 3, 1953
- Preceded by: William Clay Cole
- Succeeded by: Leonor Sullivan

Personal details
- Born: April 4, 1895 St. Joseph, Missouri, U.S.
- Died: April 26, 1963 (aged 68) St. Joseph, Missouri, U.S.
- Party: Democratic

Philip James Welch (April 4, 1895 – April 26, 1963) was an American politician who served as U.S. Representative from Missouri. A member of the Democratic Party, he represented Missouri's 3rd congressional district from 1949 to 1953.

== Life ==
Philip James Welch was born on April 4, 1895, in St. Joseph, Missouri. He was educated in public schools and worked in the furniture business from 1916 to 1931. Welch served as city treasurer for St. Joseph from 1932 to 1936, and as the city's mayor from 1936 to 1946. In that time, he also served as a delegate to the 1940 Democratic National Convention. Between 1946 and 1947, Welch served as assistant director of the Reconstruction Finance Corporation, a Depression-era federal agency that acted as a lender of last resort, in Kansas City.

Welch ran to represent Missouri's 3rd congressional district in 1948. In a strong year for Democrats, he defeated incumbent Republican William Clay Cole by a margin of 59%–41%. He defeated Cole in a rematch in 1950, by a much narrower margin of 51%–49%.

In 1952, Welch ran in the Democratic primary for governor of Missouri. He was defeated in the primary by former governor Phil M. Donnelly, who won the general election and became the first governor of Missouri to serve two non-consecutive terms.

Following his defeat in 1952, Welch served with the state's civil defense and later with the state's industrial inspection division. He died in Methodist Hospital on April 26, 1963, and is buried in Memorial Park Cemetery. The baseball park in St. Joseph, Phil Welch Stadium, is named in his honor.

U.S. House of Representatives
Preceded by William Clay Cole	Member of the U.S. House of Representatives from Missouri's 3rd congressional district 1949-1953	Succeeded by Leonor Sullivan
