= The Meadows of Gold =

History book by al-Masudi

Meadows of Gold and Mines of Gems
- Author: al-Masudi
- Original title: مُرُوج ٱلذَّهَب وَمَعَادِن ٱلْجَوْهَر
- Translator: Paul Lunde, Caroline Stone and Aloys Sprenger
- Language: Arabic, Translations: English, French
- Subject: History
- Genre: Non-fiction
- Publisher: Lunde & Stone: Kegan Paul International
- Publication date: L&S: 1989
- Publication place: Abbasid Caliphate
- Media type: Print (Hardcover)
- ISBN: 0-7103-0246-0
- OCLC: 23145342
- Dewey Decimal: 909/.097671 20
- LC Class: DS38.6 .M3813 1989

Meadows of Gold and Mines of Gems (Arabic: مُرُوج ٱلذَّهَب وَمَعَادِن ٱلْجَوْهَر, Murūj aḏ-Ḏahab wa-Maʿādin al-Jawhar) is a 10th century history book by an Abbasid scholar al-Masudi. Written in Arabic and encompassing the period from the beginning of the world (starting with Adam and Eve) through to the late Abbasid era, the book contains historically documented facts, hadiths or sayings from reliable sources and stories, as well as poetry and anecdotes.

The Meadows of Gold is considered unique in medieval Islamic history. Due to its reliance on and references to Islam, the style of the book makes up an example of what constitutes Islamic historiography.

== Editions and translations ==
A first version of the book was allegedly completed in the year 947 AD and the author spent most of his life adding and editing the work.

The first European version of The Meadows of Gold was published in both French and Arabic between 1861 and 1877 by the Societe Asiatique of Paris by Barbier de Meynard and Pavet de Courteille. For over 100 years this version was the standard version used by Western scholars until Charles Pellat published a French revision between 1966 and 1974. This revision was published by the Université Libanaise in Beirut and consists of five volumes.

Versions of the source text by Mas'udi have been published in Arabic for hundreds of years, mainly from presses operating in Egypt and Lebanon.

One English version is the abridged The Meadows of Gold: The Abbasids, published in 1989, and was translated and edited by Paul Lunde and Caroline Stone. According to this edition's introduction, their English translation is heavily edited and contains only a fragment of the original manuscript due to the editors' own personal research interests and focuses almost exclusively on the Abbasid history of Mas'udi. Their introduction also outlines how the editors relied mainly on the Pellat revision in French and are therefore mainly working from the French translation with the Arabic source text as a background guide.

Another English version was published in 1841 by Aloys Sprenger, which includes a full translation of the first volume and extensive footnotes.

Historian Hugh N. Kennedy calls the book "Probably the best introduction to the Arabic historical tradition for the non-specialist."

== Place in Islamic historiography ==
Written in the "new style" of historical writing of al-Dinawari and al-Ya'qubi, Meadows of Gold is composed in a format that contains both historically documented facts, hadiths or sayings from reliable sources and stories, anecdotes, poetry and jokes that the author had heard or had read elsewhere. Due to its reliance on and references to Islam this style of history writing makes up an example of what constitutes Islamic historiography in general.

Masudi also contributed an important role in this historicity by adding the importance of eye-witnessing a place or event in order to strengthen its veracity. Khalidi states that "Mas'udi's own observations form a valuable part of his work." And that "In contrast to Tabari, who provides little or no information on the lands and peoples of his own day, Mas'udi often corroborated or rejected geographical and other data acquired second-hand."

== Contents ==
=== Lunde & Stone ===
The contents of the Lunde & Stone version are broken into small vignettes which take up less than a full page of text in most cases. In addition are several pages of poetry.

The Lunde & Stone edition focuses primarily on the Abbasid period in modern-day Iraq and begins with a story involving the Caliph al-Mansur (r. 754–775) and ends with the reign of al-Muti (r. 946–974).

Some notable sections include several stories involving the various Caliphs and their interactions with commoners like "Mahdi and the Bedouin" (37) in which the Caliph al-Mahdi (r. 775–785) is served a humble meal by a passing Bedouin who in turn is rewarded with a large monetary reward.

A large portion of the English text is dedicated to stories involving the Caliph Harun al-Rashid (r. 786–809) and his Barmakid advisors. These stories from Masudi are key elements in several English-language historical non-fiction books about Harun al-Rashid, including Hugh N. Kennedy's When Baghdad Ruled the Muslim World, André Clot's Harun al-Rashid and the World of The Thousand and One Nights and H. St. John Philby's Harun Al-Rashid.

Another significant portion of the text involves the civil war between Caliph al-Amin (r. 809–813) at Baghdad and his half-brother al-Ma'mun (r. 813–833), who defeated Amin and became Caliph of the Abbasid Caliphate. The text spends a considerable number of pages relaying several lengthy poems about the horrors of the siege of Baghdad (812–813).

== English version reception ==
While the French version has been a key historical text for over a century, the newer English version has received mixed reviews.

The British Journal of Middle Eastern Studies' review suggests that although the English version leaves out several passages of Pellat's edited version the book still retains important historical text and the passages omitted "are digressions from the main story and interrupt its flow."

The Journal of the American Oriental Society, however, takes issue with the fact that the English version relied heavily on the French edited version (and not the entire French or Arabic version) and that the editing of the text cut out passages of "no less historical import than the ones included."

This review also is critical of the English version's use of vignette-style segments versus the style of Mas'udi, whose original work is not cut into small pieces but rather is written in full pages without apparent breaks or chapters.

== See also ==
- Yahya ibn Umar
