= Orland K. Armstrong =

American politician (1893–1987)

Orland Armstrong
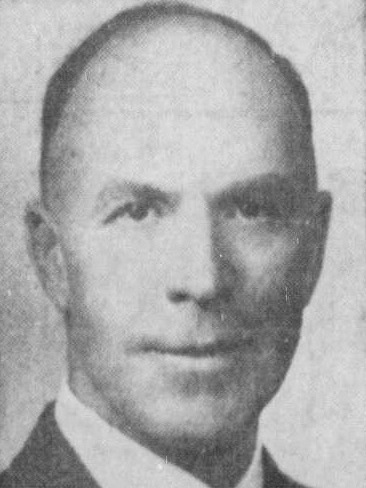

Member of the U.S. House of Representatives from Missouri's 6th district
- In office January 3, 1951 – January 3, 1953
- Preceded by: George H. Christopher
- Succeeded by: William Cole

Member of the Missouri House of Representatives
- In office 1942–1944
- In office 1932–1936

Personal details
- Born: Orland Kay Armstrong; October 2, 1893 Willow Springs, Missouri, U.S.
- Died: April 15, 1987 (aged 93) Springfield, Missouri, U.S.
- Party: Republican
- Spouse(s): Louise McCool (1922–1947); Marjorie Moore (1949–1987)
- Education: Drury University (BA); Cumberland University (LLB)

Orland Kay Armstrong (October 2, 1893 – April 15, 1987) was an American Republican politician and member of the United States House of Representatives, journalist and social activist.

== Early life ==
Orland "O.K." Armstrong was born in Willow Springs, Missouri, the third of nine children. His father, Reverend William Armstrong, was a schoolteacher and minister. The family moved frequently around southern Missouri as his father changed teaching jobs or founded new churches. Finally in 1907 the family settled in Carterville, Missouri and it was from Carterville High School that Orland graduated as valedictorian in 1912. Armstrong attended Drury College in Springfield, Missouri graduating summa cum laude in 1916 with a bachelor's degree in education.

Armstrong's first teaching position came at Southwest Baptist College in Bolivar, Missouri, where he taught English and served as basketball coach. Southwest Baptist was a natural fit for Armstrong for it was his maternal grandfather, Reverend Daniel Preston, who was one of the college founders. With America's entry into World War I in April 1917 Armstrong took a leave of absence to serve in the U.S. Army. Assigned to the Army Signal Corps, he received pilot training and would serve as an instructor pilot for the duration of the war. While serving as an instructor pilot Armstrong made his first foray into the world of journalism by acting as editor of the aviation magazine Propeller. Following the end of World War I Armstrong took a position with the YMCA, going to France for two years. In France he helped care for Russian prisoners of war awaiting return to their homeland.

After returning from France in 1920 Armstrong chose to further his education at Cumberland University, earning his second bachelor's degree and a law degree in 1922. Armstrong took and passed the Missouri Bar exam but chose not to enter into a law practice. He instead enrolled in the University of Missouri, where he earned both a bachelor's and master's degree in journalism in 1925. Resuming his role as an educator, Orland Armstrong founded the University of Florida School of Journalism. In addition to his teaching positions, Armstrong had worked as a freelance journalist for several newspapers and national magazines since the mid-1920s. One which gained him notoriety was a rare 1927 interview with Charles Lindbergh for Boys' Life magazine. The two aviators, both with Missouri ties, became lifelong friends thereafter.

== Politics ==
Returning to Missouri in 1929, Orland Armstrong first entered politics the next year in an unsuccessful run for a seat in the state senate. Armstrong tried again in 1932 and, in a year dominated by Democratic landslides from the White House to the state house, became one of only ten Republicans elected to the Missouri House of Representatives. He would serve in the House until 1936 and then again from 1942 to 1944. Armstrong would continue his journalism career even while in the state legislature, some of his reporting would have national ramifications. A series of investigative articles in 1934 into political boss Tom Pendergast, gambling, and corruption in the Kansas City political machine. Pendergast at the time was the primary supporter of Harry S. Truman, who would become U.S. President in 1945. The articles would lead to Armstrong's appointment as a special investigator by Missouri governor Lloyd Stark in 1938, and his testimony the following year before a Jackson county grand jury looking into the Pendergast machine's activities.

With the advent of World War II, Armstrong expressed isolationist views and was among the earliest to join with his friend Charles Lindbergh in the America First Committee. However, following the Japanese attack on Pearl Harbor he wholeheartedly came out in support of the American war effort. Armstrong was elected to the Missouri House again in 1942 but chose not to seek reelection to the seat in 1944, instead running for Missouri Lieutenant Governor, an election which he lost. From 1944 until 1950 Orland Armstrong served in a variety of appointed governmental roles, including the U.S. Senate committee on the Post Office and civil service.

In 1950 Armstrong was elected to his only term in the U.S. Congress. Although just a freshman legislator, he still managed to create an international incident. While on a fact-finding trip to the Far East and Taiwan in 1951 Armstrong met with Nationalist Chinese leader Chiang Kai-shek on a plan to bring Nationalist forces into the Korean War, a plan strongly opposed by President Truman's administration. Then during the Japanese Allied Peace Conference, Armstrong had a public and very heated exchange of words with the Soviet Union's chief delegate Andrei Gromyko over slave labor camps. Although Gromyko denied the charges, the exchange put a further chill in the Cold War and hampered U.S. diplomatic efforts to bring Soviet influence on North Korean and Communist Chinese leadership in hopes of achieving a peace agreement in Korea.

Due to Congressional redistricting following the 1950 census, in 1952 Armstrong would have been forced to run against friend and fellow Republican Dewey Jackson Short. Rather than do so he did not seek re-election in 1952.

Armstrong was selected by old friend John Foster Dulles to be Director of Publicity for the U.S. State Department, however before he could take the position it came to light he was under criminal investigation by the Internal Revenue Service. Eventually convicted on three counts of tax evasion, Armstrong paid a large sum in back taxes and penalties, but avoided jail time. In 1965 the Internal Revenue Service ruled that Armstrong had not intentionally defrauded the government, and refunded to him nearly $12,000 in overpayments on his income taxes, the fines he had previously paid, and interest. Armstrong mounted two more unsuccessful campaigns for public office, in 1966 and 1982, failing in attempts to return to the Missouri House.

== Life after politics ==
Orland Armstrong continued his work as a journalist the remainder of his life. Employed by Reader's Digest in various capacities since the mid-1940s, he is credited with writing over 125 articles for the magazine as well as serving on their editorial board. His articles, some written under pen names, often crusaded for civil rights, decried the growing national debt, and spoke out about the evils of pornography. In 1970 he helped create the Springfield Citizens Council for Decency, an anti-pornography group in Springfield, Missouri.

== Personal life ==
Orland Armstrong was twice-married. He met first wife, Louise McCool, while visiting and briefly working for his parents in Florida in 1920. They married in 1922 and would have five children. Louise Armstrong died of cancer in 1947. Two years later in 1949 he married friend and fellow writer Marjorie Moore and they would remain married until his death. Orland K. Armstrong died in Springfield on April 15, 1987. He is buried in Greenlawn Cemetery there. His biography was authorized by the Armstrong family and published in October 2020.

U.S. House of Representatives
Preceded by George H. Christopher	Member of the U.S. House of Representatives from Missouri's 6th congressional district 1951–1953	Succeeded by William Cole
