= William R. Hull Jr. =

American politician (1906–1977)

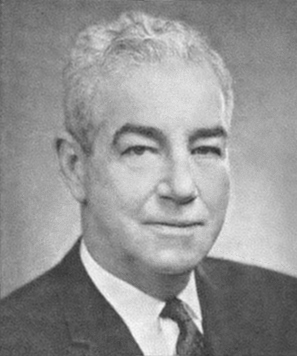

Member of the U.S. House of Representatives from Missouri's 6th district
- In office January 3, 1955 – January 3, 1973
- Preceded by: William C. Cole
- Succeeded by: Jerry Litton

Personal details
- Born: April 17, 1906 Weston, Missouri, U.S.
- Died: August 15, 1977 (aged 71) Kansas City, Missouri, U.S.
- Party: Democratic

William Raleigh Hull Jr. (April 17, 1906 – August 15, 1977) was a U.S. representative from Missouri's 6th congressional district. He was born in Weston, Missouri, into a prominent tobacco raising family. He was co-owner of Hull's Tobacco Warehouse in Weston; director of First National Bank, Leavenworth, Kansas; and mayor of Weston in 1939–1940. His first term in Congress started on January 3, 1955, and he served until January 3, 1973. He was not a candidate for re-election. He died in Kansas City, Missouri, and is buried at Graceland Cemetery in Weston.

Hull did not sign the 1956 Southern Manifesto, and voted in favor of the Civil Rights Act of 1960, the 24th Amendment to the U.S. Constitution, and the Voting Rights Act of 1965, but voted against the Civil Rights Acts of 1957, 1964, and 1968.

U.S. House of Representatives
Preceded by William C. Cole	Member of the U.S. House of Representatives from Missouri's 6th congressional district 1955–1973	Succeeded by Jerry Litton
