= Paul Lunde =

- Born: 1943 (age 82–83); California
- Died: Cambridge, UK
- Education: University of California, Berkeley, SOAS, Université Libanaise (Beirut)
- Occupations: Arabist, writer
- Relatives: David Lunde (brother), Patricia A. McKillip (sister-in-law), Caroline Stone (wife), Sir Richard Stone (father-in-law), Alexander and James Stone Lunde (sons)

Paul Lunde (born 1943) was an American Arabist and writer. He wrote or translated many books on Islam and the Arab world, and also wrote a book on codes and another on organised crime. He was a frequent contributor to Aramco World, the in-house magazine of Saudi Aramco, the national oil company of Saudi Arabia.

== Life ==
Lunde was born in California in 1943, and grew up in Saudi Arabia. He went to the University of California at Berkeley to study Arabic, and continued his studies at the School of Oriental and African Studies in London.

== Publications ==
- 1977 (as translator, with Margaret Breitenbach and Renate Franciscono) Wolfgang Lotz, Studies in Italian Renaissance Architecture. Cambridge, Massachusetts: M.I.T. Press. ISBN 9780262120739
- 1980 (with John Sabini) Aramco and its World. Dhahran: Saudi Arabia. New edition: Saudi Aramco and its World (1995).
- 1984 (with Justin Wintle). A Dictionary of Arabic and Islamic Proverbs. London: Kegan Paul International.
- 1989 Al-Mas‘ūdi, The Meadows of Gold: The Abbasids. Translated and edited by Paul Lunde and Caroline Stone. Introduction by Paul Lunde. London: Kegan Paul International.
- 2002 Islam: Faith, History, Culture. London: Dorling Kindersley.
- 2004 Organized Crime: An Inside Guide to the World’s Most Successful Industry. London: Dorling Kindersley
- 2004 "'What the devil are you doing here?' Arabic sources for the arrival of the Portuguese in the Red Sea and Indian Ocean", in Trade and Travel in the Red Sea Region. Proceedings of Red Sea Project I. Held in the British Museum October 2002. Society for Arabian Studies Monographs No. 2. Series editors D. Kennet & St. J. Simpson. BAR International Series 1269. Oxford: BAR, pp. 131–135.
- 2004 (as editor, with Alexandra Porter) Trade and Travel in the Red Sea Region: Proceedings of Red Sea Project I Held in the British Museum October 2002. Society for Arabian Studies Monographs, Pt.2. Oxford: British Archaeological Reports International. doi:10.30861/9781841716220
- 2007 (with William Facey, Michael McKinnon, Thomas A. Pledge, Arthur P. Clark and Muhammad A. Tahlawi) A Land Transformed: The Arabian Peninsula, Saudi Arabia and Saudi Aramco. The Saudi Arabian Oil Company (Saudi Aramco).
- 2007 (translator) (with Caroline Stone) Al-Mas‘ūdi: From the Meadows of Gold. Penguin Great Journeys Series. London: Penguin Classics.
- 2007 "Dipanagara's Garden: New World Plants in 16th Century Asia", in Global Trade before Globalization in the VIII-XVIII centuries, edited by Federico Mayor Zaragoza. Madrid: Fundación Cultura de Paz.
- 2007 "Arabic sources for the Ming Voyages", in Natural Resources and Cultural Connections of the Red Sea. Ed. J. Starkey, P. Starkey & T. Wilkinson. Society for Arabian Studies Monographs No. 5. BAR International Series 1661. (Oxford: BAR), pp. 229–246.
- 2009 The Book of Codes: Understanding the World of Hidden Messages (ed.), University of California Press.
- 2009 Review of A Traveller in Thirteenth-Century Arabia: Ibn al-Mujāwir’s Tārīkh al-Mustabsir, translated from Oscar Löfgren's Arabic text and edited with revisions and annotations by G. Rex Smith. The Hakluyt Society, Third Series, No. 19. (London: Ashgate for The Hakluyt Society, 2008) for the Bulletin of the Society of Arabian Studies 14 [2009], pp. 40–41.
- 2009 "Joao de Castro's Roteiro do Mar Roxo (1541)", in Red Sea IV-Connected Hiinterlands. Proceedings of the Fourth International Conference on the Peoples of the Red Sea Region, 25–26 September 2008 (Oxford: BAR), pp. 211–224.
- 2011 (with Caroline Stone) Search for the Land of Darkness: Arab Travellers in the Far North. London: Penguin Classics
- 2020 The Man Who Wrote Aladdin: The Life and Times of Hannā Diyāb, translated from the Arabic; Edinburgh, Hardinge Simpole.

Lunde wrote more than sixty articles for Aramco World, including an entire issue on "The Middle East and the Age of Discovery" in 1992, and a special issue on "The Indian Ocean and Global Trade" in 2005.
