= John Kyl =

American politician

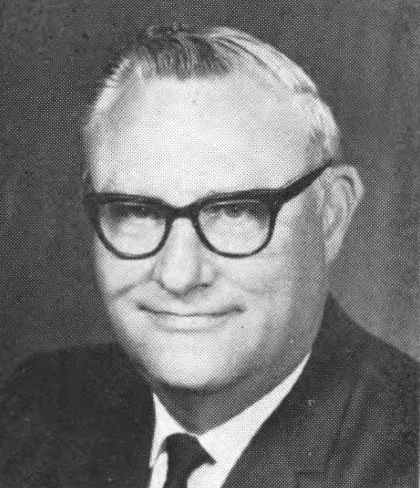
- Kyl in 1971

Member of the U.S. House of Representatives from Iowa's 4th district
- In office January 3, 1967 – January 3, 1973
- Preceded by: Bert Bandstra
- Succeeded by: Neal Smith
- In office December 15, 1959 – January 3, 1965
- Preceded by: Steven V. Carter
- Succeeded by: Bert Bandstra

Personal details
- Born: John Henry Kyl; May 9, 1919 Wisner, Nebraska, U.S.
- Died: December 23, 2002 (aged 83) Phoenix, Arizona, U.S.
- Party: Republican
- Spouse: Arlene Griffith
- Children: 3, including Jon
- Education: Wayne State College; University of Nebraska–Lincoln

John Henry Kyl (May 9, 1919 – December 23, 2002) was an American politician who served as a member of the United States House of Representatives, representing Iowa's 4th congressional district from 1959 to 1965 and again from 1967 to 1973. He was a member of the Republican Party.

== Early life and education ==
Kyl was born in Wisner, Nebraska, the son of Johanna (née Boonstra) and Jon George Kyl, both Dutch immigrants. He graduated from Nebraska State Teachers College (Wayne, Nebraska) and the University of Nebraska.

== Career ==
Kyl was a teacher at Nebraska State Teachers College from 1940 to 1950. In the 1950s, he moved to Bloomfield, Iowa, where he joined his brother George in the clothing business. He also worked as a television journalist for KTVO in Ottumwa, Iowa.

Kyl ran for the U.S. House of Representatives in 1958, losing to Steven V. Carter. However, Carter died on November 4, 1959, after less than one year in office. Kyl then won a special election to fill the vacancy. He continued to serve as the representative from Iowa's 4th congressional district for two additional terms, but was defeated in the 1964 United States House of Representatives elections, in which Democrats gained 36 seats in the House. He recaptured his former seat in 1966, and then won re-election in 1968 and 1970. Reapportionment after the 1970 census put him into the same district as incumbent Democrat Neal Edward Smith, who defeated him in the 1972 election.

From 1973 to 1977, he served as Assistant Secretary for Congressional and Legislative Affairs in the United States Department of the Interior. he died in Phoenix Arizona on December 23 2002 of complications from a stroke at age 83.

== Personal life ==
Kyl was married to Arlene (née Griffith), with whom he had three children, including Jon Kyl (1942-2026). Jon went on to serve as a three-term U.S. Senator from Arizona, from 1995 to 2013 and briefly in 2018. He also served as Senate Minority Whip.

U.S. House of Representatives
Preceded by Steven V. Carter	Member of the U.S. House of Representatives from Iowa's 4th congressional district 1959–1965	Succeeded by Bert Bandstra
Preceded by Bert Bandstra	Member of the U.S. House of Representatives from Iowa's 4th congressional district 1967–1973	Succeeded by Neal E. Smith
