= Steven V. Carter =

American politician (1915–1959)

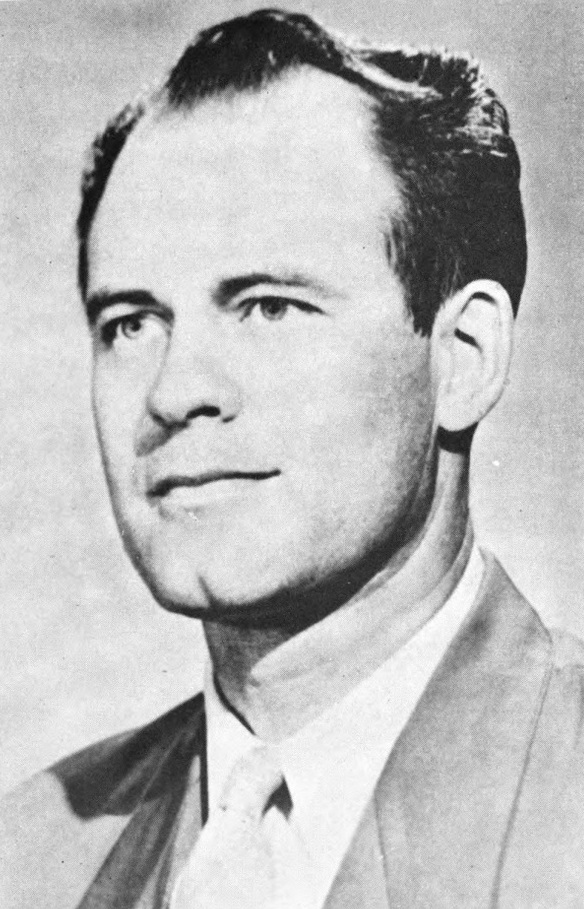
- Frontispiece of 1960's Steven V. Carter, Late a Representative.

Member of the U.S. House of Representatives from Iowa's 4th district
- In office January 3, 1959 – November 4, 1959
- Preceded by: Karl M. LeCompte
- Succeeded by: John Henry Kyl

Personal details
- Born: October 8, 1915 Carterville, Utah, U.S.
- Died: November 4, 1959 (aged 44) Bethesda, Maryland, U.S.
- Party: Democratic
- Education: Graceland College; University of Iowa; University of Iowa College of Law
- Profession: Attorney

Military service
- Allegiance: United States
- Branch/service: US Navy
- Battles/wars: World War II

Steven V. Carter (October 8, 1915 – November 4, 1959) was a Democratic U.S. representative from south central Iowa in 1959.

Born in Carterville (now part of Provo), Utah, at age fourteen Carter moved with his parents to Lamoni, Iowa, and graduated from Lamoni High School. He graduated from Graceland College in Lamoni in 1934, the University of Iowa in 1937, and the University of Iowa College of Law in 1939.

Admitted to the bar in 1939, Carter commenced the practice of law in Leon, Iowa. He served as county attorney of Decatur County, Iowa from 1940 to 1944, but his tenure ended when he enlisted in the United States Navy, serving as a supply officer in the South Pacific Theatre in World War II. After the war, he then served as city attorney of Leon from 1946 to 1948.

In 1948, 1950, and 1956, Carter was an unsuccessful Democratic candidate for the U.S. House seat held by Karl M. LeCompte. He formally challenged the outcome of the 1956 election, but in 1958 Congress rejected his challenge. When LeCompte did not seek re-election in 1958, Carter ran again for the House, and won, defeating Republican John Henry Kyl.

Carter had suffered from cancer before his election to Congress, but believed that he had fully recovered. However, during his first month in Congress doctors determined that the cancer had returned, and he was soon hospitalized. Carter served from January 3, 1959, until his death in Bethesda, Maryland, on November 4, 1959. Kyl then won a special election to fill the vacancy.

== See also ==
- List of members of the United States Congress who died in office (1950–1999)

U.S. House of Representatives
Preceded by Karl M. LeCompte	Member of the U.S. House of Representatives from Iowa's 4th congressional district 1959	Succeeded by John H. Kyl
