= Neal Smith (politician) =

American politician (1920–2021)

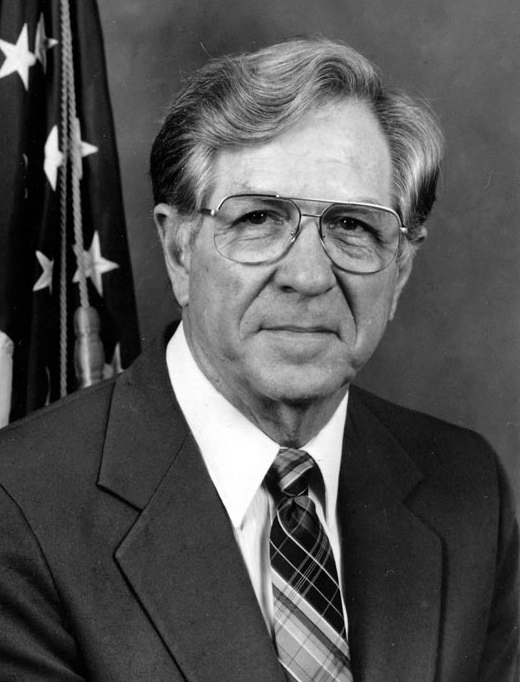

Member of the U.S. House of Representatives from Iowa
- In office January 3, 1959 – January 3, 1995
- Preceded by: Paul Cunningham
- Succeeded by: Greg Ganske
- Constituency: 5th district (1959–1973); 4th district (1973–1995)

Personal details
- Born: March 23, 1920 Keokuk County, Iowa, U.S.
- Died: November 2, 2021 (aged 101) Des Moines, Iowa, U.S.
- Party: Democratic
- Spouse: Beatrix Havens (m. 1946; died 2016)
- Children: 2

Military service
- Allegiance: United States
- Branch/service: United States Army Air Forces
- Years of service: 1942–1945
- Battles/wars: World War II
- Awards: Purple Heart; Air Medal (4)
- Neal Smith's voice Neal Smith speaks on FY1988 appropriations for commerce, justice, state and the judiciary Recorded June 29, 1987

Neal Edward Smith (March 23, 1920 – November 2, 2021) was an American politician who was a member of the United States House of Representatives for the Democratic Party from Iowa from 1959 until 1995, the longest-serving Iowan in the United States House of Representatives.

Upon the death of Lester L. Wolff in May 2021, Smith became the oldest living current or former member of Congress. He held this title until his death nearly six months later.

== Early life ==
Smith was born in his grandparents' home near Hedrick, Keokuk County, Iowa. He served in the United States Army Air Forces during the Second World War as a bomber pilot.

His plane was shot down and he received a Purple Heart, nine battle stars, and the Air Medal with four oak leaf clusters.

First with points to exit military service from his group and quickly recruited into university.

He received his undergraduate training at the University of Missouri and Syracuse University and received a law degree from Drake University in 1950.

== Career ==
Before entering politics he served as an assistant county attorney for Polk County.

He served as National President of the Young Democratic Clubs of America from 1953 to 1955. He served as Chairman of the Polk County Welfare Board from 1953 to 1954.

Smith was elected to the House of Representatives in the Democratic landslide of 1958, and was reelected 17 more times from a district based in Des Moines—numbered as the 5th District from 1959 to 1973 and as the 4th District from 1973 to 1995.

A federal anti-nepotism law, sponsored by Smith, was enacted in 1967 prevents public officials, including the president, from appointing any relative to head an executive agency. When the law was passed in 1967, it was presumed to be a congressional response to U.S. President John F. Kennedy appointing his younger brother, Robert Kennedy, as U.S. attorney general. As the author of the bill, however, Smith repeatedly denied this was his motive. Smith instead aimed the legislation, the Federal Postal Act of 1967, at nepotism in the postal service, and it applied broadly to both the executive and legislative branches. He said it applied to Congress because "there were 50 members who had their wives on the payrolls."

For most of his tenure, Smith represented a relatively compact district in central Iowa. However, the 1990s redistricting pushed him into a district covering the southwest quadrant of the state from Des Moines to Council Bluffs, an area that he did not know and that did not know him. He was reelected in 1992, but was defeated in the Republican landslide of 1994 by Greg Ganske, mainly due to heavy losses in the western portion of the district.

== Personal life ==
Neal Smith married Beatrix Havens in 1946 and they had two children: Doug and Sharon. His wife died in 2016.

The Neal Smith Wildlife Refuge in Prairie City and the Neal Smith Trail in Des Moines are both named after the former congressman, as well as the Neal Smith Federal Building in Des Moines. The Neal and Bea Smith Law Center at Drake University is named after the former congressman and his wife.

In 1996 Smith published his autobiography: Mr. Smith Went to Washington: From Eisenhower to Clinton, in 2009 he wrote Hanging Out in Bur Oak: During the 1930s Depression, Bootleggers, the Draft, World War II, a Leveling Experience and in 2019 From My Century to Yours: Wisdom from the Near 100-Year Life of Former Congressman Neal Edward Smith.

At the time of his defeat, he had represented Iowa in Congress longer than anyone in the state's history; he has since been passed by Democrat Tom Harkin, who served for a combined 40 years in the House and Senate, and by Republican Chuck Grassley, who as of 2023 has served for over 48 years in the House and Senate. However, Smith continues to hold the record for service in the House of Representatives. He turned 100 in March 2020.

Smith died on November 2, 2021, at the age of 101.

U.S. House of Representatives
Preceded by Paul Cunningham	Member of the U.S. House of Representatives from Iowa's 5th congressional district 1959–1973	Succeeded by William J. Scherle
Preceded by John Kyl	Member of the U.S. House of Representatives from Iowa's 4th congressional district 1973–1995	Succeeded by Greg Ganske
Honorary titles
Preceded by Lester L. Wolff	Oldest living United States representative (Sitting or former); May 11, 2021 – November 2, 2021	Succeeded by Bob Dole
