= William J. Randall =

American politician

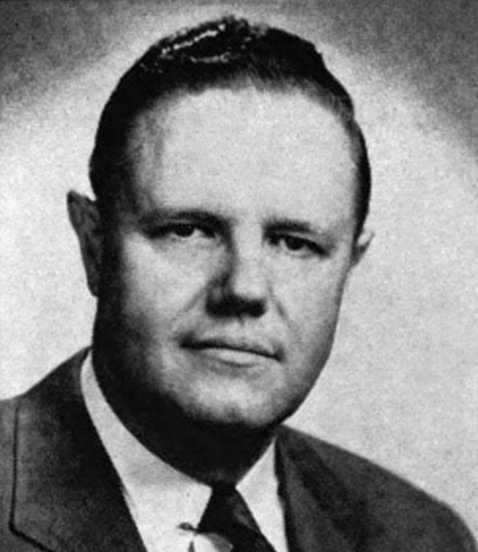

Member of the U.S. House of Representatives from Missouri's 4th district
- In office March 3, 1959 – January 3, 1977
- Preceded by: George H. Christopher
- Succeeded by: Ike Skelton

Personal details
- Born: July 16, 1909 Independence, Missouri, U.S.
- Died: July 7, 2000 (aged 90) Independence, Missouri, U.S.
- Party: Democratic
- Education: University of Missouri; Kansas City School of Law

Military service
- Allegiance: United States
- Branch/service: United States Army
- Rank: sergeant
- Battles/wars: World War II

William Joseph Randall (July 16, 1909 – July 7, 2000) was a member of the United States House of Representatives. He was a member of the Democratic Party from Missouri.

== Early life and early career ==
Randall was born in Independence, Missouri. He attended the University of Missouri and later the Kansas City School of Law, from which he earned his Juris Doctor. Randall served as a private attorney for seven years until being drafted into the United States Army in 1943. He served in the Philippines during World War II, and he eventually reached the rank of sergeant.

== Political career ==
After returning home for the war, Randall was elected as a Jackson County, Missouri judge in 1946 and served until 1959. Following the death of Congressman George H. Christopher, Randall was elected to Congress in the 1959 special election to succeed him. Randall voted in favor of the Civil Rights Acts of 1960 and 1964, and the Voting Rights Act of 1965, but voted against the Civil Rights Act of 1968.

Randall was considered a close ally of Harry Truman. He served on the Armed Services Committee and the Committee on Government Operations. In 1975, he became the first chair of the House Select Committee on Aging. In 1977, Randall retired from the House to resume the practice of law.

== Death ==
He died on July 7, 2000.

== Sources ==
- United States Congress. "William J. Randall (id: R000041)". Biographical Directory of the United States Congress.
- December 1949 photograph of Judge Randall

U.S. House of Representatives
Preceded by George H. Christopher	Member of the U.S. House of Representatives from Missouri's 4th congressional district 1959–1977	Succeeded by Ike Skelton
