= George H. Christopher =

American politician (1888–1959)

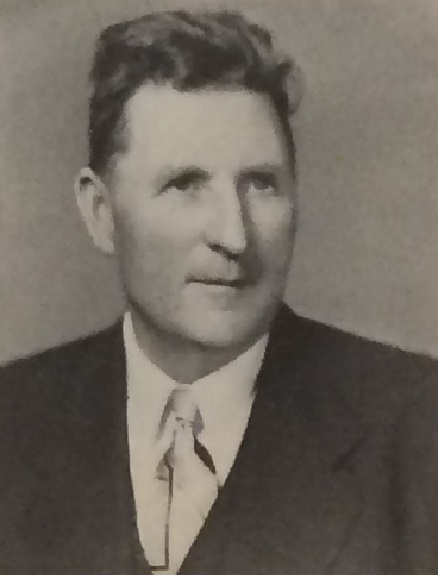

Member of the U.S. House of Representatives from Missouri
- In office January 3, 1955 – January 23, 1959
- Preceded by: Jeffrey Paul Hillelson
- Succeeded by: William J. Randall
- Constituency: 4th district
- In office January 3, 1949 – January 3, 1951
- Preceded by: Marion T. Bennett
- Succeeded by: Orland K. Armstrong
- Constituency: 6th district

Personal details
- Born: December 9, 1888 near Butler, Missouri, US
- Died: January 23, 1959 (aged 70) Washington, D.C., US
- Party: Democratic

George Henry Christopher (December 9, 1888 – January 23, 1959) was a Democratic representative from Missouri's 6th congressional district from January 3, 1949, to January 3, 1951, and from the Missouri's 4th congressional district from January 3, 1955, until his death from a heart attack on January 23, 1959. Christopher did not sign the 1956 Southern Manifesto and voted in favor of the Civil Rights Act of 1957.

He was born on a farm in Bates County, Missouri, near Butler, Missouri. He graduated from Hill's Business College, Sedalia, Missouri, in 1907. He lived on a farm in Calhoun County, Illinois, and Craig County, Oklahoma, before returning to Missouri.

He is buried in Oak Hill Cemetery in Butler.

== See also ==
- List of members of the United States Congress who died in office (1950–1999)

== Sources ==
- United States Congress. "George H. Christopher (id: C000383)". Biographical Directory of the United States Congress.

U.S. House of Representatives
Preceded by Marion T. Bennett	Member of the U.S. House of Representatives from Missouri's 6th congressional district 1949–1951	Succeeded by Orland K. Armstrong
Preceded by Jeffrey Paul Hillelson	Member of the U.S. House of Representatives from Missouri's 4th congressional district 1955–1959	Succeeded by William J. Randall
