= List of locations of West Virginia congressional papers =

Below is a list of the locations for the congressional papers of the United States senators and representative of West Virginia.

== U.S. senators from West Virginia ==
Senator	Party	Years	Collection locations
Peter G. Van Winkle	Union Republican	August 4, 1863 - March 3, 1869	West Virginia & Regional History Center at West Virginia University has three separate collections of Winkle's papers. Brown University has one letter to Van Winkle in the Mary Rivers Allen collection, 1846–1881.
Waitman T. Willey	Union Republican	August 4, 1863 - March 3, 1871	West Virginia & Regional History Center at West Virginia University has two separate collections of Willey's papers. Virginia Museum of History & Culture has miscellaneous items in various collections. University of Virginia's Alderman Library has miscellaneous items from 1867 to 1870.
Arthur I. Boreman	Republican	March 4, 1869 - March 3, 1875	West Virginia & Regional History Center at West Virginia University has two collections of Boreman's papers. West Virginia State Archives has items in the West Virginia Union Militia Collection, along with miscellaneous items in several other collections. The Morgan Library & Museum has one letter from 1873.
Henry Gassaway Davis	Democratic	March 4, 1871 - March 3, 1883	West Virginia & Regional History Center at West Virginia University has three separate collections that containing letters, correspondences, business documents, and political papers. The Special Collection Research Center at Syracuse University has correspondences in the Arthur Pue Gorman collection. The Library of Congress has miscellaneous photographs, drawings, and papers.
Allen T. Caperton	Democratic	March 4, 1875 - July 26, 1876	Virginia Museum of History & Culture has the Caperton family papers, 1729–1923. Additional items can also be found in various collections. Library of Virginia has a few items, including land grants from Caperton. West Virginia & Regional History Center at West Virginia University has miscellaneous items in various collections. West Virginia State Archives has miscellaneous papers located throughout the collection. Filson Club Historical Society has numerous letters to family during his time in Congress in the Guthrie-Caperton family papers.
Samuel Price	Democratic	August 26, 1876 - January 26, 1877	West Virginia & Regional History Center at West Virginia University has two collection of his papers, along with some miscellaneous items. West Virginia State Archives has miscellaneous papers throughout their collection.
Frank Hereford	Democratic	January 26, 1877 - March 3, 1881	West Virginia & Regional History Center has two collection of his papers from 1825 to 1891. West Virginia State Archives has miscellaneous papers located throughout the collection. The Library of Congress has miscellaneous photographs, drawings, and papers.
Johnson N. Camden	Democratic	March 4, 1881 - March 3, 1887; January 25, 1893 - March 3, 1895	West Virginia & Regional History Center at West Virginia University has a collection of correspondences from Camden. West Virginia State Archives has miscellaneous papers located throughout the collection.
John E. Kenna	Democratic	March 4, 1883 - January 11, 1893	West Virginia State Archives has his collection of personal, family, political and business papers. West Virginia & Regional History Center at West Virginia University has miscellaneous items in the Frank Hereford Collection and is mentioned in the Henri Jean Muglar diary and memoir. The Library of Congress has a memorial address for his life and a photograph.
Charles James Faulkner	Democratic	March 4, 1887 - March 3, 1899	The University of Virginia Library has a collection of Faulkner Family Papers which includes correspondences of Faulkner's. Duke University Library has collection of letters and telegrams, along with a few miscellaneous items. Virginia Museum of History & Culture has Faulkner's family papers, which contains correspondence, financial records, and legal documents concerning his law practice and his service in the U.S. Senate. West Virginia & Regional History Center at West Virginia University has miscellaneous items throughout their collection. The Library of Congress has miscellaneous photographs, drawings, and papers.
Stephen Benton Elkins	Republican	March 4, 1895 - January 4, 1911	West Virginia & Regional History Center at West Virginia University has a large collection consists of Elkin's papers, which also includes photographs, and maps. The Bentley Historical Library at the University of Michigan has correspondences in the Henry Carter Adams papers. Duke University Library has correspondence in Gordon Butcher Gibbens papers. The Special Collection Research Center at Syracuse University has correspondences in the William J. Arkell Papers and the Levi P. Morton Correspondence collection. Brigham Young University Library has one letter in the George Q. Cannon collection, a book, and an atlas. The Library of Congress has miscellaneous photographs, drawings, and papers. West Virginia State Archives has miscellaneous items, including photographs. The Morgan Library & Museum has a letter from Elkins to Harper & Brothers.
Nathan B. Scott	Republican	March 4, 1899 - March 3, 1911	West Virginia & Regional History Center at West Virginia University has miscellaneous items in various collections. West Virginia State Archives has miscellaneous items in various collections.
Davis Elkins	Republican	January 9, 1911 - January 31, 1911 March 4, 1919 - March 3, 1925	West Virginia & Regional History Center at West Virginia University has miscellaneous items in various collections.
Clarence Wayland Watson	Democratic	February 1, 1911 - March 3, 1913	West Virginia & Regional History Center at West Virginia University has miscellaneous items in various collections.
William Edwin Chilton	Democratic	March 4, 1911 - March 3, 1917	West Virginia & Regional History Center at West Virginia University has a collection of papers dealing with politics, business deals, and family affairs. West Virginia State Archives has miscellaneous items in two collections and photographs.
Nathan Goff Jr.	Republican	April 1, 1913 - March 3, 1919	West Virginia & Regional History Center at West Virginia University has his collection of papers. They include materials from his time as the U.S. district attorney for West Virginia, Secretary of the Navy, U.S. Congressman, federal judge, and U.S. Senator. West Virginia State Archives has miscellaneous items in various collections.
Howard Sutherland	Republican	March 4, 1917 - March 3, 1923	West Virginia & Regional History Center at West Virginia University has his collection of papers from 1914 to 1921. West Virginia State Archives has a collection of personal, business, and congressional papers. The Rare Book & Manuscript Library at Columbia University has one letter in the John Wesley Hill collection. The Library of Congress has photographs of Sutherland.
Matthew M. Neely	Democratic	March 4, 1923 - March 3, 1929 March 4, 1931 - January 12, 1941 January 3, 1949 - January 8, 1958	West Virginia & Regional History Center at West Virginia University has his collection of papers, consisting of speeches, correspondence, and scrapbooks of newspaper clippings from his political terms.
Guy D. Goff	Republican	March 4, 1925 - March 3, 1931	West Virginia & Regional History Center at West Virginia University has his collection of papers, which includes correspondence, clippings, speeches, and essay. West Virginia State Archives has a miscellaneous items in various collections. Cornell University Library's Division of Rare and Manuscript Collections has correspondences in the Richard Brown Scandrett papers. The Library of Congress has photographs of Goff.
Henry D. Hatfield	Republican	March 4, 1929 - January 3, 1935	West Virginia & Regional History Center at West Virginia University has his collection of Hatfields papers and letters. Marshall University Library Special Collections has a collection of scrapbooks, photographs, some papers, and tools related to his medical practice. West Virginia State Archives has a miscellaneous items throughout their collection. Yale University Library Manuscripts & Archives has correspondences in the Charles Dewey Hilles papers.
Rush D. Holt Sr.	Democratic	January 3, 1935 - January 3, 1941	West Virginia & Regional History Center at West Virginia University has a large collection of Holt's personal and political papers.
Harley M. Kilgore	Democratic	January 3, 1941 - February 28, 1956	West Virginia & Regional History Center at West Virginia University has a large collection of Kilgore's political papers. West Virginia State Archives has a small collection of political and personal papers. Penn Libraries Rare Book & Manuscript Library has two letters written by Kilgore.
Joseph Rosier	Democratic	January 13, 1941 - November 17, 1942	West Virginia & Regional History Center has miscellaneous items in various collections.
Hugh Ike Shott	Republican	November 18, 1942 - January 3, 1943	West Virginia & Regional History Center has a collection of his personal, business, and political papers.
William Chapman Revercomb	Republican	January 3, 1943 - January 3, 1949 November 7, 1956 - January 3, 1959	West Virginia & Regional History Center at West Virginia University has a small collection of Revercomb's political papers. West Virginia State Archives has a small collection of personal and political papers.
William Ramsey Laird, III	Democratic	March 13, 156 - November 6, 1956	West Virginia & Regional History Center at West Virginia University has miscellaneous items in the Samuel Mallison papers.
John D. Hoblitzell Jr.	Republican	January 25, 1958 - November 4, 1958	West Virginia & Regional History Center at West Virginia University has a collection of Hoblitzell's political papers. West Virginia State Archives has miscellaneous items and photographs in various collections.
Jennings Randolph	Democratic	November 5, 1958 - January 3, 1985	West Virginia State Archives has his collection of political and personal papers, photographs, and memorabilia. West Virginia & Regional History Center at West Virginia University has miscellaneous items in various collections. The John F. Kennedy Presidential Library and Museum has miscellaneous speeches, correspondences, photographs and oral history in their collection. Richard B. Russell Library for Political Research and Studies at University of Georgia has an oral history from Randolph discussing Richard Russell. Berea College Special Collections & Archives has correspondences in the Council of Southern Mountains Records, and oral interviews in the Michael and Carrie Nobel Kline Collection. Columbia University Libraries Oral History Archive has an oral history interview with Randolph in the Social Security projects. Hagley Museum and Library has material concerning Randolph's role as advocate of airmail pick-up system in All American Engineering Company records.
Robert Byrd	Democratic	January 3, 1959 - June 28, 2010	Robert C. Byrd Center for Congressional History and Education at Shepherd University has an extensive collection of materials from his time as a U.S. Representative and U.S. Senator. Vanderbilt Television News Archive has over 1000 recordings of television news broadcasts featuring Byrd. West Virginia & Regional History Center at West Virginia University has miscellaneous items throughout their collection. Gerald R. Ford Presidential Library has miscellaneous correspondence and briefing papers in their collection. The Library of Congress Manuscript Collection has an oral interview in the Capitol Historical Society Oral History Collection. Julian P. Kanter Political Commercial Archive at University of Oklahoma has commercial's featuring Byrd.
John D. Rockefeller, IV	Democratic	January 15, 1985 - January 3, 2015	West Virginia & Regional History Center at West Virginia University has Rockefeller's political papers. Julian P. Kanter Political Commercial Archive at University of Oklahoma has commercial's featuring Rockefeller.
Carte Goodwin	Democratic	January 16, 2010 - November 15, 2010	West Virginia State Archives has Goodwin's political papers.
Joe Manchin, III	Democratic	November 15, 2010 – January 3, 2025	
Shelley Moore Capito	Republican	January 3, 2015 – present	Senator still in office. Julian P. Kanter Political Commercial Archive at University of Oklahoma has commercial's featuring Capito.

== U.S. representatives from West Virginia ==
Representative	Party	Years	Collection locations
Jacob B. Blair	Union	December 17, 1863 - March 3, 1865	West Virginia & Regional History Center at West Virginia University has a few correspondences throughout their collection. The Morgan Library & Museum has a letter from Blair to Zachariah Chandler.
Kellian Van Rensalear Whaley	Union	December 7, 1863 - March 3, 1867	Virginia Museum of History & Culture has a collection of letters written to Whaley by friends and constituents. West Virginia State Archives has letters from various correspondents in their collection. The Library of Congress has correspondences from Whaley to Abraham Lincoln.
William G. Brown Sr.	Union	December 7, 1863 - March 3, 1865	West Virginia & Regional History Center at West Virginia University has a collection of personal papers.
George R. Latham	Union	March 4, 1865 - March 3, 1867	West Virginia & Regional History Center at West Virginia University has a collection of his personal and political papers.
Chester D. Hubbard	Union	March 4, 1865 - March 3, 1867	Collection location unknown.
Bethuel M. Kitchen	Republican	March 4, 1867 - March 3, 1869	Collection location unknown.
Daniel H. Polsley	Republican	March 4, 1867 - March 3, 1869	Collection location unknown.
James C. McGrew	Republican	March 4, 1869 - March 3, 1873	Collection location unknown.
Isaac H. Duval	Republican	March 4, 1869 - March 3, 1871	Collection location unknown.
John S. Witcher	Republican	March 4, 1869 - March 3, 1871	Collection location unknown.
Frank Hereford	Democratic	March 4, 1871 - January 31, 1877	West Virginia & Regional History Center has a collection of his papers from 1825 to 1891. West Virginia State Archives has miscellaneous papers located throughout the collection. The Library of Congress has miscellaneous photographs, drawings, and papers.
John J. Davis	Democratic	March 4, 1871 - March 3, 1875	West Virginia & Regional History Center has a collection of Davis's personal, political, and family papers.
John M. Hagans	Republican	March 4, 1873 - March 3, 1875	Collection location unknown.
Charles J. Faulkner Sr.	Democratic	March 4, 1875 - March 3, 1877	West Virginia & Regional History Center at West Virginia University has a collection of the Fulkner's papers, along with miscellaneous item in other collections. Virginia Museum of History & Culture has a collection of Faulkner's family papers, which contains correspondence concerning his legal and political career. The University of Virginia Albert and Shirley Small Special Collection Library has a collection of Faulkner Family Papers. The Earl Gregg Swem Library at the College of William & Mary has correspondences from Faulkner in the John B. Floyd Papers.
Benjamin Wilson	Democratic	March 4, 1875 - March 3, 1883	Collection location unknown.
Benjamin F. Martin	Democratic	March 4, 1877 - March 3, 1881	Collection location unknown.
John E. Kenna	Democratic	March 4, 1877 - March 3, 1883	West Virginia State Archives has his collection of personal, family, political and business papers. West Virginia & Regional History Center has miscellaneous items in the Frank Hereford Collection and is mentioned in the Henri Jean Muglar diary and memoir. The Library of Congress has a memorial address for his life and a photograph.
John B. Hoge	Democratic	March 4, 1881 - March 3, 1883	Collection location unknown.
Eustace Gibson	Democratic	March 4, 1883 - March 3, 1887	Collection location unknown.
Nathan Goff Jr.	Republican	March 4, 1883 - March 3, 1889	West Virginia & Regional History Center has his collection of papers. They include materials from his time as the U.S. district attorney for West Virginia, Secretary of the Navy, U.S. Congressman, federal judge, and U.S. Senator. West Virginia State Archives has miscellaneous items in various collections.
William Lyne Wilson	Democratic	March 4, 1883 - March 3, 1895	Washington and Lee University Special Collections and Archives has Wilson's political, university, and postmaster papers. West Virginia & Regional History Center at West Virginia University has a collection of Wilson's letters. The Massachusetts Historical Society has correspondences in the Edward Atkinson papers.
Charles P. Snydere	Democratic	March 15, 1883 - March 3, 1889	Collection location unknown.
Charles E. Hogg	Democratic	March 4, 1887 - March 3, 1889	Collection location unknown.
John O. Pendleton	Democratic	March 4, 1889 - February 26, 1890 March 4, 1891 - March 3, 1895	Collection location unknown.
James M. Jackson	Democratic	March 4, 1889 - February 3, 1890	Collection location unknown.
John D. Alderson	Democratic	March 4, 1889 - March 3, 1895	West Virginia & Regional History Center at West Virginia University has correspondences in various collections.
George W. Atkinson	Republican	February 26, 1890 - March 3, 1891	West Virginia State Archives has a large collection of his papers.
Charles Brooks Smith	Republican	February 3, 1890 - March 3, 1891	Collection location unknown.
James Capehart	Democratic	March 4, 1891 - March 3, 1895	Collection location unknown.
Alston G. Dayton	Republican	March 4, 1895 - March 16, 1905	West Virginia & Regional History Center at West Virginia University has a large collection of Dayton's papers. Miscellaneous items can also be found in other collections.
James Hall Huling	Republican	March 4, 1895 - March 3, 1897	Collection location unknown.
Warren Miller	Republican	March 4, 1895- March 3, 1899	Collection location unknown.
Blackburn B. Dovener	Republican	March 4, 1895 - March 3, 1907	Collection location unknown.
Charles P. Dorr	Republican	March 4, 1897 - March 3, 1899	West Virginia & Regional History Center at West Virginia University has a collection of letters regarding re-election.
Romeo H. Freer	Republican	March 4, 1899 - March 3, 1901	Collection location unknown.
David Emmons Johnston	Democratic	March 4, 1899 - March 3, 1901	Collection location unknown.
James A. Hughes	Republican	March 4, 1901 - March 3, 1915 March 4, 1927 - March 2, 1930	Collection location unknown.
Joseph H. Gaines	Republican	March 4, 1901 - March 3, 1911	Collection location unknown.
Harry C. Woodyard	Republican	March 4, 1903 - March 3, 1911 November 7, 1916 - March 3, 1923 March 4, 1925 - March 3, 1927	West Virginia & Regional History Center at West Virginia University has a collection of business and political papers.
Thomas Beall Davis	Democratic	June 6, 1905 - March 3, 1907	West Virginia & Regional History Center at West Virginia University has a collection of business and political papers.
George Cookman Sturgiss	Republican	March 4, 1907 - March 3, 1911	West Virginia & Regional History Center at West Virginia University has a collection of Sturgiss papers, mostly correspondence and newspaper clippings.
William Pallister Hubbard	Republican	March 4, 1907 - March 3, 1911	West Virginia & Regional History Center at West Virginia University has the Hubbard family papers which includes materials of Williams.
Adam Brown Littlepage	Democratic	March 4, 1911 - March 3, 1913 March 4, 1915 - March 3, 1919	Collection location unknown.
John W. Davis	Democratic	March 4, 1911 - August 28, 1913	West Virginia & Regional History Center at West Virginia University has a collection of correspondences and papers, a collection of photographs, and the records of his law practice, Davis & Davis Law Firm. Yale University Library has a collection of business, political, and personal papers. The Powell Archives at Washington and Lee University School of Law has a collection of materials from his time at the law school, and other miscellaneous items. The Library of Congress Manuscript Division has correspondences from Davis in the Huntington Gilchrist papers, Robert Lansing Papers, Riggs Family Papers, Huston Thompson Papers, and the Charles Warren Papers. Columbia University Libraries Oral History Archive has oral history discussing Davis. Georgetown University Library's Booth Family Center for Special Collections has a collection of correspondence from his time as a Solicitors General. Tennessee State Library and Archives has correspondences from Davis in the Cordell Hull papers. The Bentley Historical Library at the University of Michigan has correspondences from Davis in the Horatio J. Abbott papers, George Murphy papers, and Rebecca Shelley papers. The Albert and Shirley Small Special Collections Library at University of Virginia has correspondences from Davis in the Hampson Gary papers.
John M. Hamilton	Democratic	March 4, 1911 - March 3, 1913	Collection location unknown.
William Gay Brown Jr.	Democratic	March 4, 1911, - March 9, 1916	Collection location unknown.
Hunter Holmes Moss Jr.	Republican	March 4, 1913 - July 15, 1916	Collection location unknown.
Samuel B. Avis	Republican	March 4, 1913 - March 3, 1915	Collection location unknown.
Howard Sutherland	Republican	March 4, 1913 - March 3, 1917	West Virginia & Regional History Center at West Virginia University has his collection of papers from 1914 to 1921. West Virginia State Archives has a collection of personal, business, and congressional papers. The Rare Book & Manuscript Library at Columbia University has one letter in the John Wesley Hill collection. The Library of Congress has photographs of Sutherland.
Matthew M. Neely	Democratic	October 14, 1913 - March 3, 1921 January 3, 1945 - January 3, 1947	West Virginia & Regional History Center has his collection of papers, consisting of speeches, correspondence, and scrapbooks of newspaper clippings from his political terms.
Edward Cooper	Republican	March 4, 1915 - March 3, 1919	Collection location unknown.
George Meade Bowers	Republican	March 9, 1916 - March 3, 1923	David M. Rubenstein Rare Book & Manuscript Library at Duke University has Bower's papers, which includes a scrapbook, photographs, and telegrams. Stanford University Libraries has correspondences of Bowers in the Fur Seal Controversy Papers.
Stuart Felix Reed	Republican	March 4, 1917 - March 3, 1925	Collection location unknown.
Leonard S. Echols	Republican	March 4, 1919 - March 3, 1923	Collection location unknown.
Wells Goodykoontz	Republican	March 4, 1919 - March 3, 1923	Collection location unknown.
Benjamin L. Rosenbloom	Republican	March 4, 1921 - March 3, 1925	Collection location unknown.
Jennings Randolph	Democratic	March 4, 1922 - January 3, 1947	West Virginia State Archives has a large collection of political and personal papers, photographs, and memorabilia. West Virginia & Regional History Center at West Virginia University has miscellaneous items in various collections. John F. Kennedy Presidential Library and Museum has miscellaneous speeches, correspondences, photographs and oral history in their collection. Richard B. Russell Library for Political Research and Studies at University of Georgia has an oral history from Randolph discussing Richard Russell. Berea College Special Collections & Archives has correspondences in the Council of Southern Mountains Records, and oral interviews in the Michael and Carrie Nobel Kline Collection. Columbia University Libraries Oral History Archive has an oral history interview with Randolph in the Social Security projects. Hagley Museum and Library has material concerning Randolph's role as advocate of airmail pick-up system in All American Engineering Company records. Julian P. Kanter Political Commercial Archive at University of Oklahoma has commercial's featuring Randolph.
James Alfred Taylor	Democratic	March 4, 1923 - March 3, 1927	Collection location unknown.
George William Johnson	Democratic	March 4, 1923 - March 3, 1925 March 4, 1933 - January 3, 1943	The Lilly Library at Indiana University Bloomington has correspondences in the Louis Leon Ludlow papers.
Thomas Jefferson Lilly	Democratic	March 4, 1923 - March 3, 1925	Collection location unknown.
Robert E. Lee Allen	Democratic	March 4, 1923 - March 9, 1925	Collection location unknown.
Frank Llewellyn Bowman	Republican	March 4, 1925 - March 3, 1933	Collection location unknown.
John M. Wolverton	Republican	March 4, 1925 - March 3, 1927 March 4, 1929 - March 3, 1931	West Virginia & Regional History Center at West Virginia University has two scrapbooks of Wolverton's.
James F. Strother	Republican	March 4, 1925 - March 3, 1929	Collection location unknown.
Carl G. Bachmann	Republican	March 4, 1925 - March 3, 1933	Collection location unknown.
Edward T. England	Republican	March 4, 1927 - March 3, 1929	Collection location unknown.
William Smith O'Brien	Democratic	March 4, 1927 - March 3, 1929	West Virginia & Regional History Center at West Virginia University has O'Brien's political, personal, and family papers.
Joseph L. Smith	Democratic	March 4, 1929 - March 3, 1945	Collection location unknown.
Hugh Ike Shott	Republican	March 4, 1929 - March 3, 1933	West Virginia & Regional History Center at West Virginia University has a collection of his personal, business, and political papers.
Robert Lynn Hogg	Republican	November 4, 1930 - March 3, 1933	Collection location unknown.
Lynn Hornor	Democratic	March 4, 1931 - September 23, 1933	Collection location unknown.
Robert Lincoln Ramsay	Democratic	March 4, 1933 - January 3, 1939 January 3, 1949 - January 3, 1953	West Virginia & Regional History Center at West Virginia University has a collection of speeches, bills, and correspondence.
John Kee	Democratic	March 4, 1933 - May 8, 1951	Collection location unknown.
Andrew Edmiston Jr.	Democratic	November 28, 1933 - January 3, 1943	West Virginia & Regional History Center at West Virginia University has Edmiston's political, personal, and business papers.
Andrew Charles Schiffler	Republican	January 3, 1939 - January 3, 1941	Collection location unknown.
Edward G. Rohrbough	Republican	January 3, 1943 - January 3, 1945 January 3, 1947 - January 3, 1949	Collection location unknown.
Hurbert S. Ellis	Republican	January 3, 1943 - January 3, 1949	Collection location unknown.
Cleveland M. Bailey	Democratic	January 3, 1945 - January 3, 1947 January 3, 1949 - January 3, 1963	Ohio History Connection has correspondences from Bailey in the G. George DeNucci Papers.
Erland Harold Hedrick	Democratic	January 3, 1945 - January 3, 1953	Collection location unknown.
Francis J. Love	Republican	January 3, 1947 - January 3, 1949	Collection location unknown.
Melvin C. Snyder	Republican	March 4, 1947 - March 4, 1949	West Virginia & Regional History Center at West Virginia University has a Snyder's political papers.
Harley Orrin Staggers	Democratic	January 3, 1949 - January 3, 1981 January 3, 1983 - January 3, 1993	Robert C. Byrd Center for Congressional History and Education at Shepherd University has a large portion of Stagger's political papers, with West Virginia & Regional History Center holding the rest of the collection. West Virginia & Regional History Center at West Virginia University has a small portion of Staggers political papers. Julian P. Kanter Political Commercial Archive at University of Oklahoma has commercial's from Stagger's campaigns.
Maurice G. Burnside	Democratic	January 3, 1949 - January 3, 1953 January 3, 1955 - January 3, 1957	Joyner Library Special Collections at East Carolina University has Burnside's political papers which are composed largely of scrapbooks, newspaper clippings, and photographs.
Maude Elizabeth Kee	Democratic	July 17, 1951 - January 3, 1965	West Virginia & Regional History Center at West Virginia University has a collection of political correspondences to Elizabeth and her son, James.
Will E. Neal	Republican	January 3, 1953 - January 3, 1955 January 3, 1957 - January 3, 1969	Collection location unknown.
Bob H. Mollohan	Democratic	January 3, 1953 - January 3, 1957 January 3, 1969 - January 3, 1983	West Virginia & Regional History Center at West Virginia University has miscellaneous items in various collections.
Robert Byrd	Democratic	January 3, 1953 - January 3, 1959	Robert C. Byrd Center for Congressional History and Education at Shepherd University has an extensive collection of materials from his time as a U.S. Representative and U.S. Senator. Vanderbilt Television News Archive has over 1000 recordings of television news broadcasts featuring Byrd. West Virginia & Regional History Center at West Virginia University has miscellaneous items throughout their collection. Gerald R. Ford Presidential Library has miscellaneous correspondence and briefing papers in their collection. The Library of Congress Manuscript Collection has an oral interview in the Capitol Historical Society Oral History Collection.
Arch A. Moore Jr.	Republican	January 3, 1957 - January 3, 1969	West Virginia & Regional History Center at West Virginia University has Moore's political and governor papers. Julian P. Kanter Political Commercial Archive at University of Oklahoma has a large collection of commercial's featuring Moore.
John M. Slack Jr.	Democratic	January 3, 1959 - March 17, 1980	West Virginia State Archives has Slack's political papers.
Kenneth W. Hechler	Democratic	January 3, 1959 - January 3, 1977	Marshall University Library Special Collections has Hechler's political papers. Harry S. Truman Presidential Library & Museum has a collection of papers from Hechler's time as Special Assistant to President Truman. Julian P. Kanter Political Commercial Archive at University of Oklahoma has commercial's featuring Hechler.
James Kee	Democratic	January 3, 1965 - January 3, 1973	West Virginia & Regional History Center at West Virginia University has a collection of political correspondence to James and his mother, Elizabeth.
Nick Joe Rahall, II	Democratic	January 3, 1977 - January 3, 2015	West Virginia & Regional History Center at West Virginia University has his political papers. Julian P. Kanter Political Commercial Archive at University of Oklahoma has commercial's featuring Rahall.
John G. Hutchinson	Democratic	June 30, 1980 - January 3, 1981	Collection location unknown.
Cleveland K. Benedict	Republican	January 3, 1981 - January 3, 1983	Julian P. Kanter Political Commercial Archive at University of Oklahoma has campaign commercials of Benedict's.
David Michael Staton	Republican	January 3, 1981 - January 3, 1983	Collection location unknown.
Robert Ellsworth Wise Jr.	Democratic	January 3, 1983 - January 3, 2001	West Virginia State Archives has Wise's political collection. Robert C. Byrd Center for Congressional History and Education at Shepherd University has an oral history interview with Wise. Julian P. Kanter Political Commercial Archive at University of Oklahoma has campaign commercials.
Alan B. Mollohan	Democratic	January 3, 1983 - January 3, 2011	West Virginia & Regional History Center at West Virginia University has a collection of letters to his supporters about his loss in the election. Julian P. Kanter Political Commercial Archive at University of Oklahoma has campaign commercials of Mollohan's.
Shelley Moore Capito	Republican	January 3, 2001 - January 3, 2015	Collection location unknown.
David McKinley	Republican	January 3, 2011 – January 3, 2023	Julian P. Kanter Political Commercial Archive at University of Oklahoma has commercial's featuring McKinley.
Evan Jenkins	Republican	January 3, 2015 - September 20, 2018	Collection location unknown.
Alex Mooney	Republican	January 3, 2015 – present	Representative still in office.
Carol Miller	Republican	January 3, 2019 – present	Representative still in office.

== See also ==
- List of United States senators from West Virginia
- List of United States representatives from West Virginia

== Sources ==
- Biographical Directory of the United States Congress, 1774 - present
- History, Art & Archives of the U.S. House of Representatives
