= List of people from Charleston, West Virginia =

This is a list of people who were born in, lived in, or are closely associated with the city of Charleston, West Virginia.

== Athletics ==
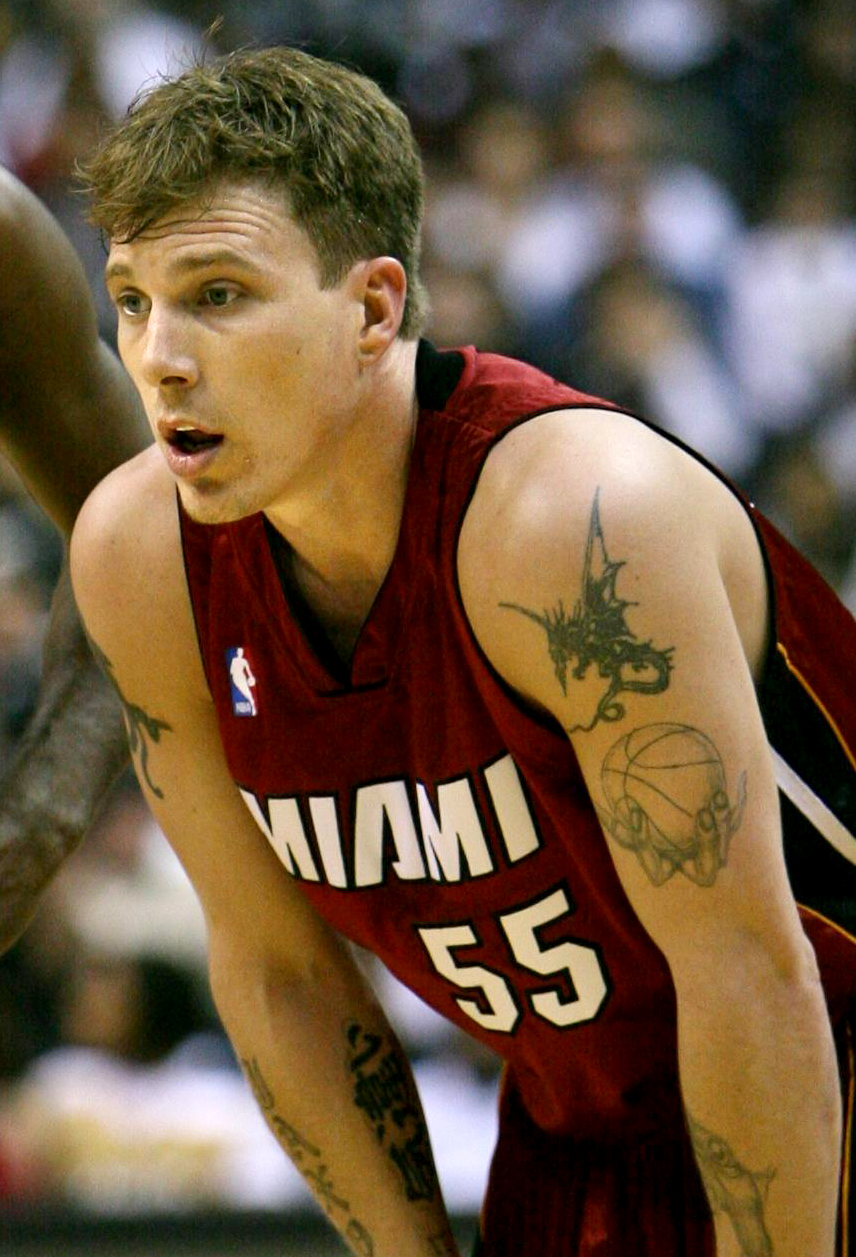
Jason Williams

- Randy Barnes, Olympic shot put gold and silver medalist
- Brian Bowles, MMA fighter, bantamweight champion
- Kevin Canady, professional wrestler founder of IWA East Coast
- Dorian Etheridge, linebacker for the Atlanta Falcons
- William Frischkorn, cyclist
- George H. Goodrich, justice, Superior Court of the District of Columbia
- Dennis Harrah, former NFL player
- J. R. House, professional baseball player and coach J. R. House
- Hot Rod Hundley, basketball player and broadcaster
- George King, NBA player and head coach of West Virginia and Purdue
- John Kruk, former Major League Baseball player and current sportscaster, born in Charleston, but grew up in Keyser
- Rick Nuzum, National Football League player
- Phil Pfister, world's strongest man (2006), firefighter for CFD
- Russ Thomas, NFL player, general manager of Detroit Lions 1967–1989
- Anne White, tennis player, attended John Adams Junior High School and graduated from George Washington High School.
- Jason Williams, Miami Heat point guard, grew up in Belle in the same vicinity, high school teammate of Randy Moss
- Harry Young, athlete and coach, member of College Football Hall of Fame

== Arts & entertainment ==
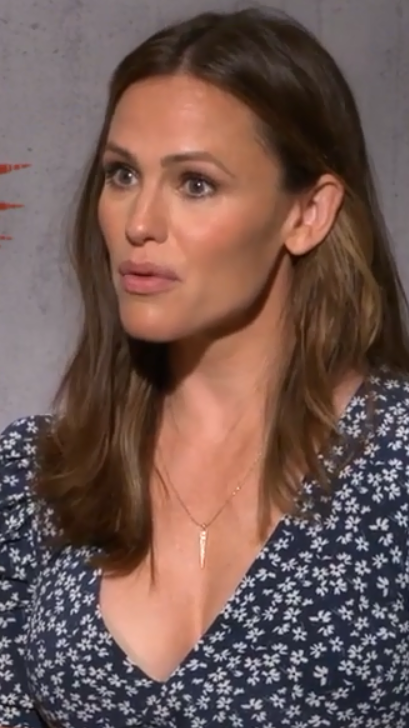
Jennifer Garner

- Jean Carson, actress
- Douglas Dick, actor
- Barbara DuMetz, photographer, born in Charleston
- George Crumb, classical composer
- Conchata Ferrell, actress
- Sierra Ferrell, musician, singer-songwriter
- Paul Frame, chiropractor and former ballet dancer
- Peter Frame, ballet dancer
- Jennifer Garner, actress, Alias
- Lesli Kay, soap opera actress, has appeared on As the World Turns, General Hospital and The Bold and the Beautiful
- Robert "RJ" Haddy, special effects artist, born and resides in Charleston
- Allison Hayes, actress
- Ann Magnuson, actress
- Tom McBride, actor, Friday the 13th Part II
- Nick Nolte, actor
- Caroline Peyton, pop singer
- Eugenia Price, author
- Roger Price, creator of Droodles, television personality
- Alec Ross, author and technology policy analyst
- Kristen Ruhlin, actress
- Red Sovine, country singer
- Sam Trammell, actor and True Blood star; born in New Orleans, but grew up in Charleston, graduating from city's George Washington High School

== Politics ==
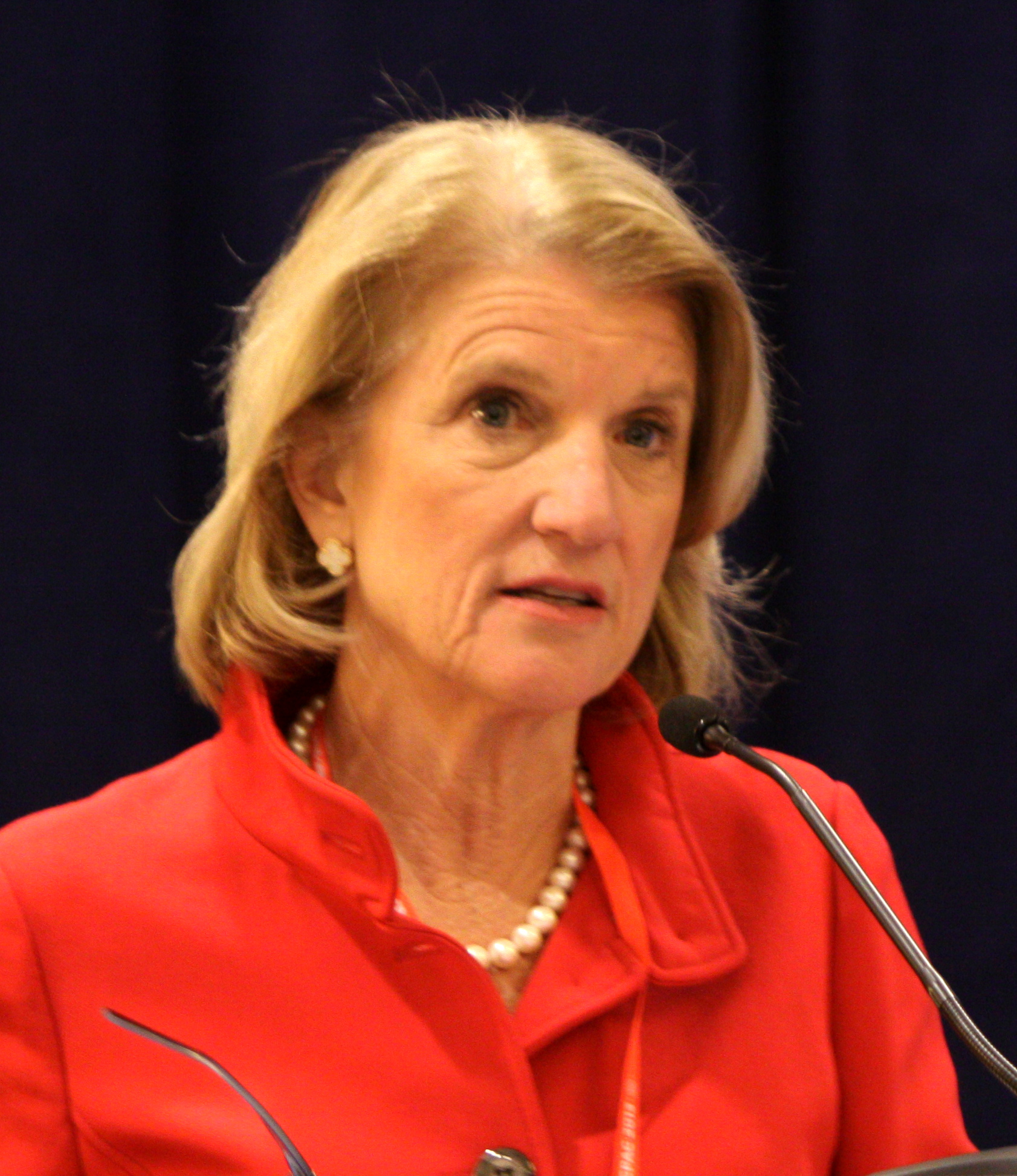
Shelley Moore Capito

- Shelley Moore Capito, U.S. senator; former U.S. congresswoman and state delegate
- William E. Chilton, newspaper publisher and U.S. senator
- Sarah Feinberg, interim president of the New York City Transit Authority and former head of the Federal Railroad Administration
- John B. Floyd, former mayor of Charleston
- George H. Goodrich, justice, Superior Court of the District of Columbia
- Amy Shuler Goodwin, mayor of Charleston
- Tresa Howell, West Virginia House of Delegates from the 52nd district
- James H. Huling, former mayor of Charleston
- John G. Hutchinson, former mayor of Charleston
- Danny Jones, former mayor of Charleston
- Jim Justice, U.S. senator for West Virginia and governor of West Virginia
- Ray Keener, member of the West Virginia House of Delegates
- Joe F. Smith, former mayor of Charleston
- Daniel Webster, longest-serving Florida legislator, born in Charleston

== Other ==
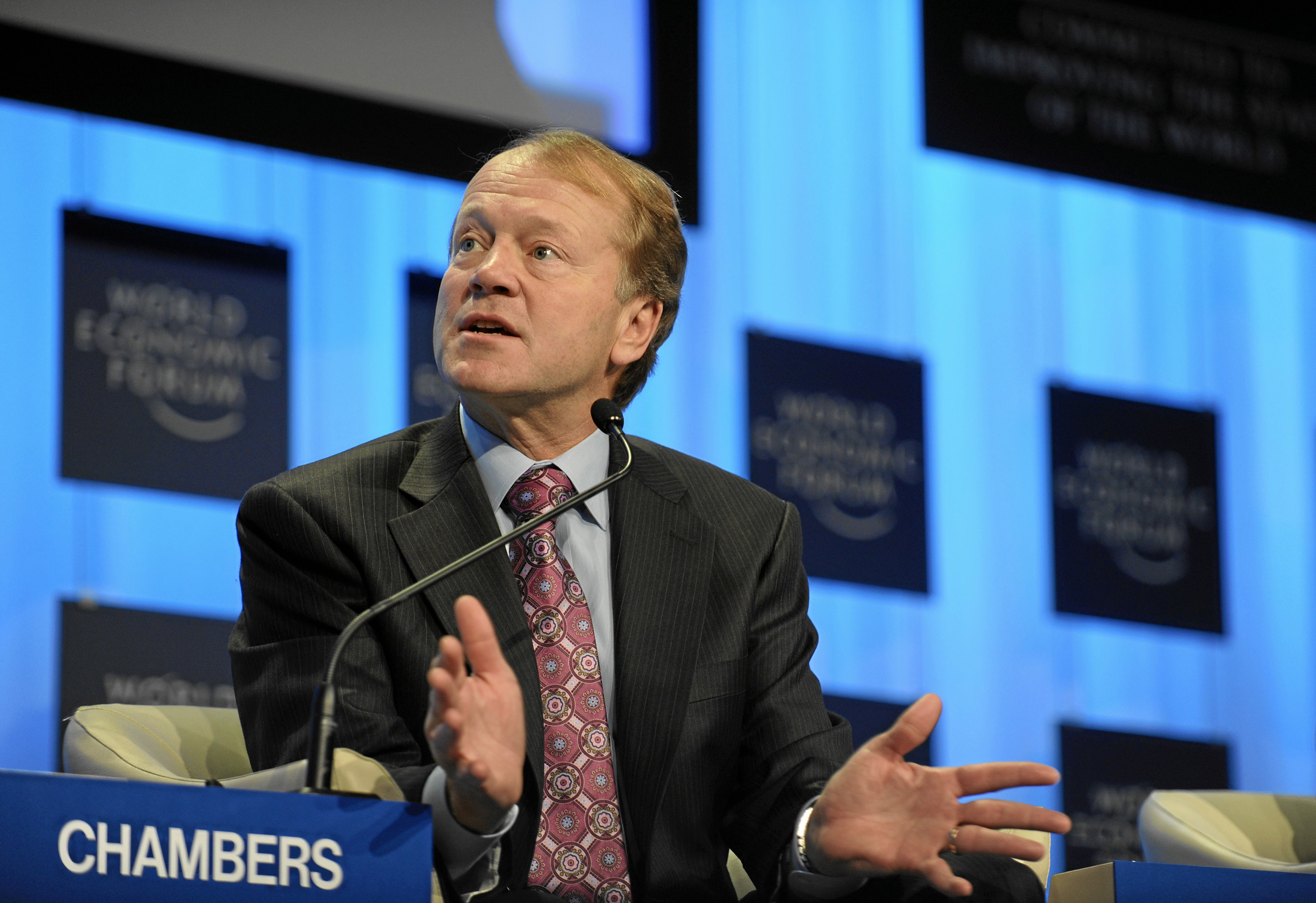
John Chambers

- Harriet C. Babbitt, diplomat and attorney
- Israel Bettan, rabbi and professor
- John Chambers, Cisco Systems CEO
- H. Rodgin Cohen, banker
- Basudeb DasSarma, chemist
- Elizabeth Harden Gilmore, civil rights activist
- Jon McBride, NASA astronaut, born in Charleston
- George Armitage Miller, a founder of the field of cognitive psychology
- Sara Jane Moore, would-be presidential assassin
- Leon Sullivan, civil rights activist

== See also ==
- List of mayors of Charleston, West Virginia
