= Carl Albert Center =

Research and educational institution of the U.S. Congress at University of Oklahoma

Carl Albert Congressional Research and Studies Center
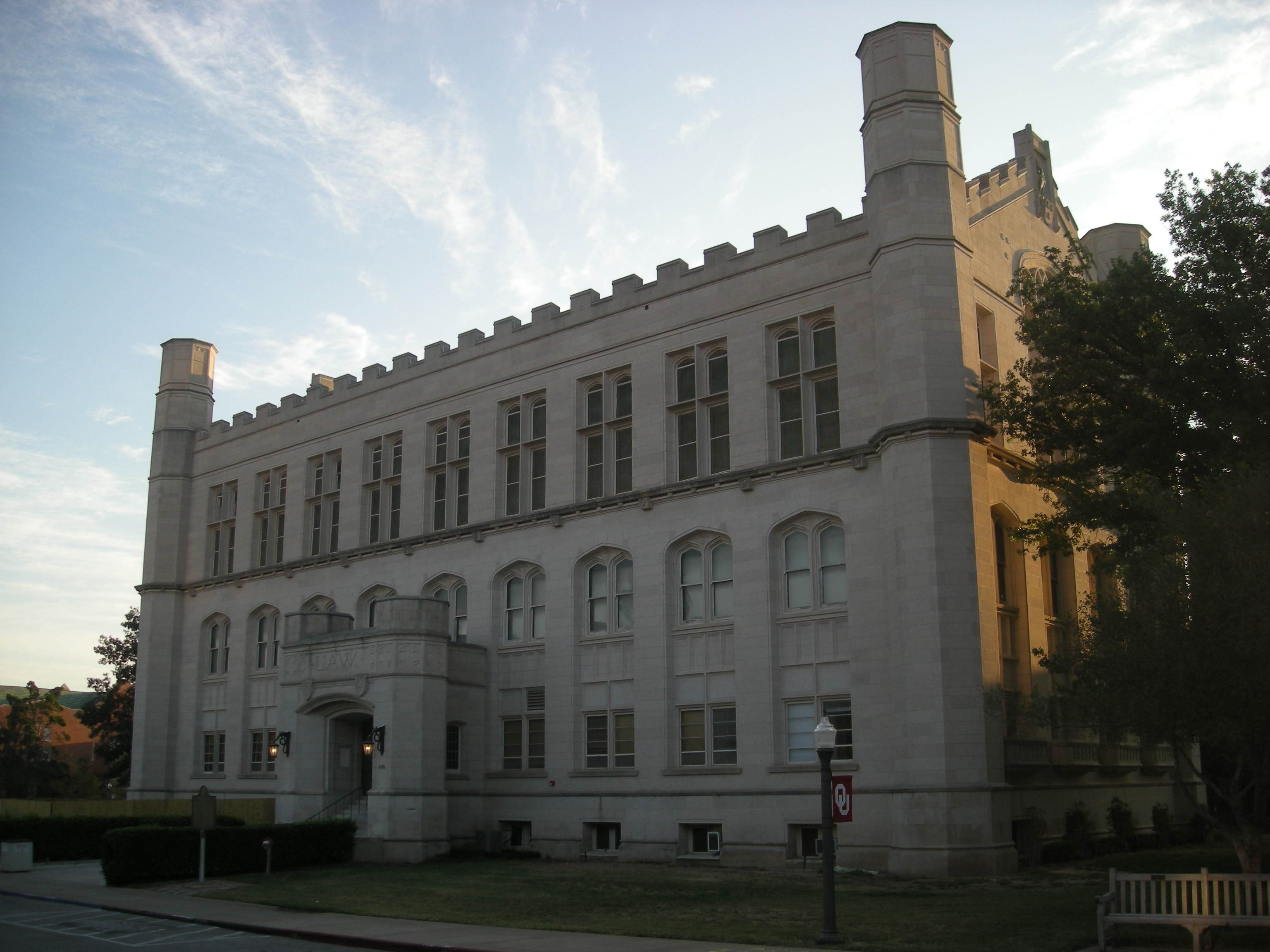
- Monnet Hall on the campus of the University of Oklahoma, home to the Carl Albert Center
- 35°12′34.32″N 97°26′42.34″W
- Location: University of Oklahoma; Norman, Oklahoma, United States
- Type: Archive and Research Center
- Scope: United States Congress; Oklahoma politics
- Established: 1979

Collection
- Size: 61 former members of the US Congress and 25 political leaders

Other information
- Director: Michael Crespin
- Employees: 8
- Website: Carl Albert Congressional Research and Studies Center James R. Jones-Carl Albert Center Digital Archives Extensions Journal of the Carl Albert Congressional Research and Studies Center Dick T. Morgan Digital Collection Carl Albert Congressional Research and Studies Center Human Rights Digital Archive Collection Carl Albert Congressional Center Constituent Correspondence Project

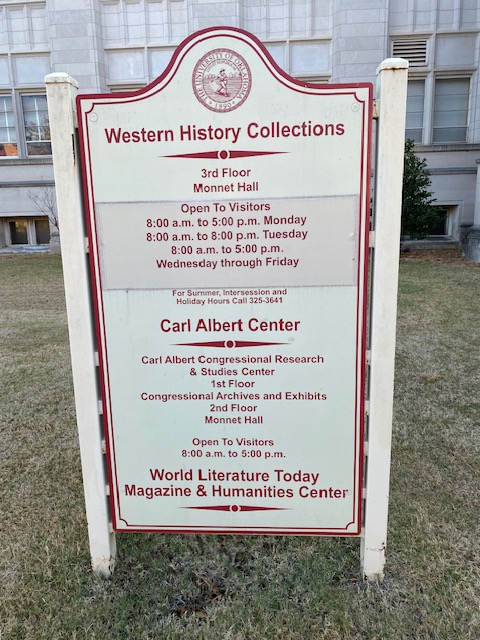
University of Oklahoma Carl Albert Center

The Carl Albert Congressional Research and Studies Center is a nonpartisan institution devoted to teaching and research related to the United States Congress and, more broadly, to strengthening representative democracy through engaged and informed citizens. Located at the University of Oklahoma in Norman, Oklahoma the Center is a living tribute to the ideals, leadership, and accomplishments of Carl Albert - native Oklahoman, University of Oklahoma alumnus, Rhodes Scholar and 46th Speaker of the U.S. House of Representatives.

== History ==
The Carl Albert Center was founded by Professor Ron Peters and established in 1979 by the Oklahoma Regents for Higher Education and the Board of Regents of the University of Oklahoma. Supported by private, foundation and public funds, the Center has grown into one of the largest and most comprehensive congressional studies centers in the country. The Center's early federal funding proved to be controversial, as a "yearlong battle" occurred in Congress before it approved a $2-million appropriation in 1982. Of the eight members in Oklahoma's congressional delegation that year, seven supported federal funding for the Carl Albert Center, with only Don Nickles opposing it. Nickles argued that the "Senate won't buy" the idea of federal funding for the Center, while Dave McCurdy (one of the seven in support) termed Nickles' opposition "unfortunate" and contended that the institution was "good for the University of Oklahoma" and "of national importance". In 1982, the Center contained 40 sets of congressional papers, 36 of which were from Oklahomans; however, a number of Oklahoma lawmakers wanted it to eventually become, in the words of journalist Denise Gamino, "the premier national repository for congressional papers".

== Congressional and political collections ==
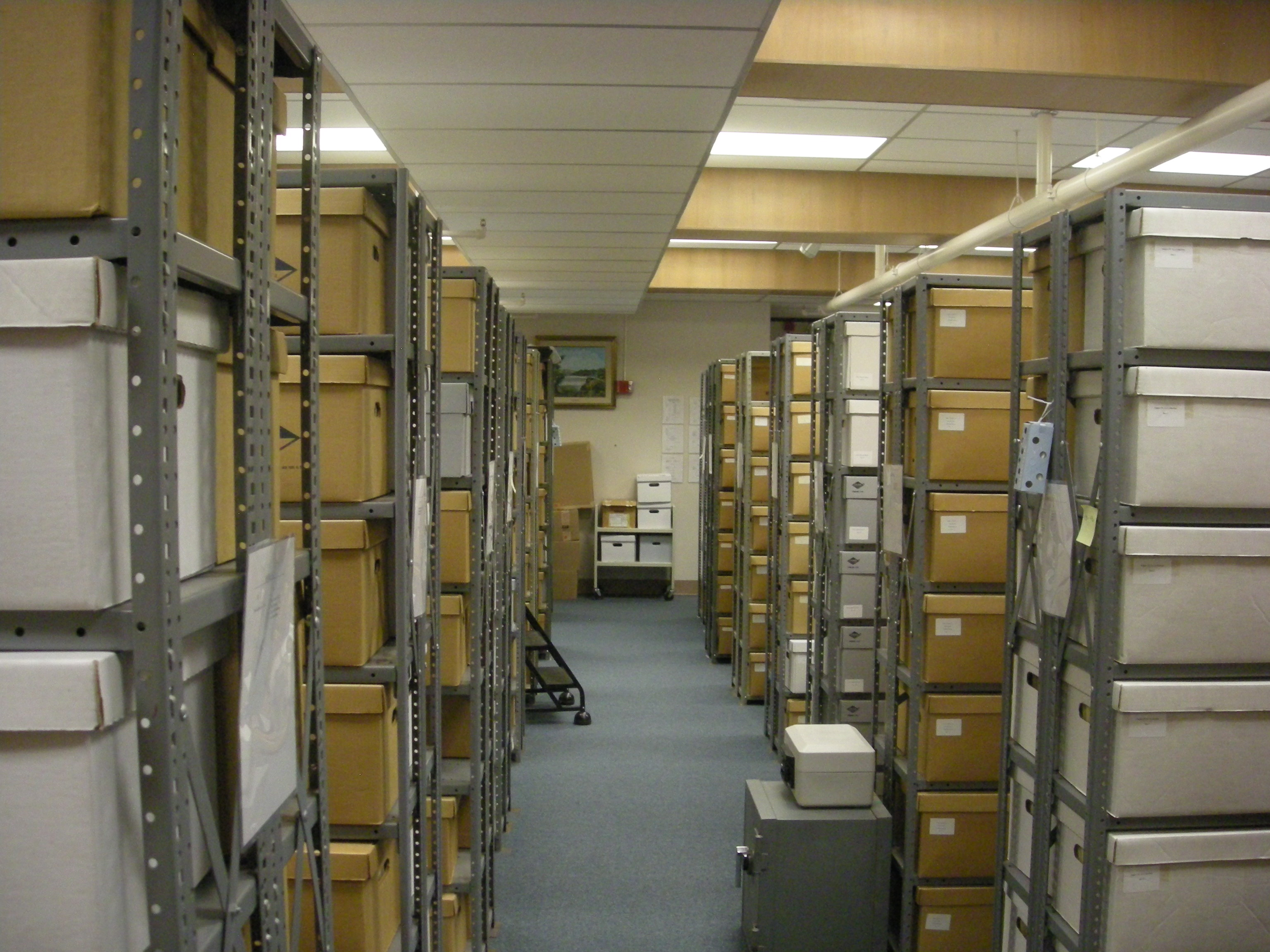
The stacks at the Carl Albert Center

The Carl Albert Center now houses the largest collection of political and congressional papers in the state of Oklahoma; the Center's Archives contain manuscripts, photographs, and oral histories, including the papers of 61 former Congress members and 25 political leaders, congressional staffers, and others related to congressional history and scholarship, including scholars, journalists, former political aides, and organizations. Besides the papers of Carl Albert himself, the Carl Albert Center also holds the collections of numerous United States Senators and Representatives from Oklahoma, including Dewey F. Bartlett, Page Belcher, John Newbold Camp, Fred R. Harris, James R. Jones, Robert S. Kerr, Dave McCurdy, Dick T. Morgan, A. S. Mike Monroney, Tom Steed, and Elmer Thomas. Beyond these Oklahoma-related materials, the Center also includes the papers of a number of congressional representatives from other states, including Jeffery Cohelan and Helen Gahagan Douglas of California, Millicent Fenwick and Cornelius Edward Gallagher of New Jersey, Carl Hatch of New Mexico, Dick Armey of Texas, Elbert D. Thomas of Utah, and Andrew Biemiller of Wisconsin. The institution additionally holds the papers of many people related to the history and study of Congress, including UPI reporter Harry Culver, historians Danney Goble and Richard N. Lowitt, presidential advisor Bryce Harlow, political scientist Ronald M. Peters, Jr., former mayor of Norman and political scientist Cindy Simon Rosenthal and press secretaries Jim Monroe, Beth Campbell Short, and Malvina Stephenson. Digitized content from the collections can be viewed on the James R. Jones Digital Archive and on the American Congress Digital Archives Portal.

The Carl Albert Center is also home to the Julian P. Kanter Political Commercial Archive, a depository for over 100,000 political television and radio commercials.

In addition to its congressional collections, the Carl Albert Center holds materials relating to state politics in Oklahoma, including oral history interviews with state senators. The Center also contains a number of collections of thematic interest, such as on the Great Depression and the relationship between Native Americans and public policy. These congressional and political collections encompass over 100 years of American History, from Oklahoma's territorial days to the turn of the century, with the largest amount of materials created between the 1930s and the 1990s.

The Carl Albert Center's Congressional Archives sponsor exhibits, including traveling and online exhibits on the Mingo Creek flooding in Tulsa, OK, the creation of Lake Thunderbird in Norman, as well as travel grants for visiting scholars. Former exhibits at the Carl Albert Center have included such subjects and collections as the relationship between Washington politicians and Hollywood actors, Easter greeting cards, Oklahoma's representatives in the U.S. Senate and House of Representatives, the New Deal, and the history of Speakers of the U.S. House of Representatives.

The Carl Albert Center Archives were featured on the C-Span Cities Tour in 2018 and 2012.

== Activities and programs ==
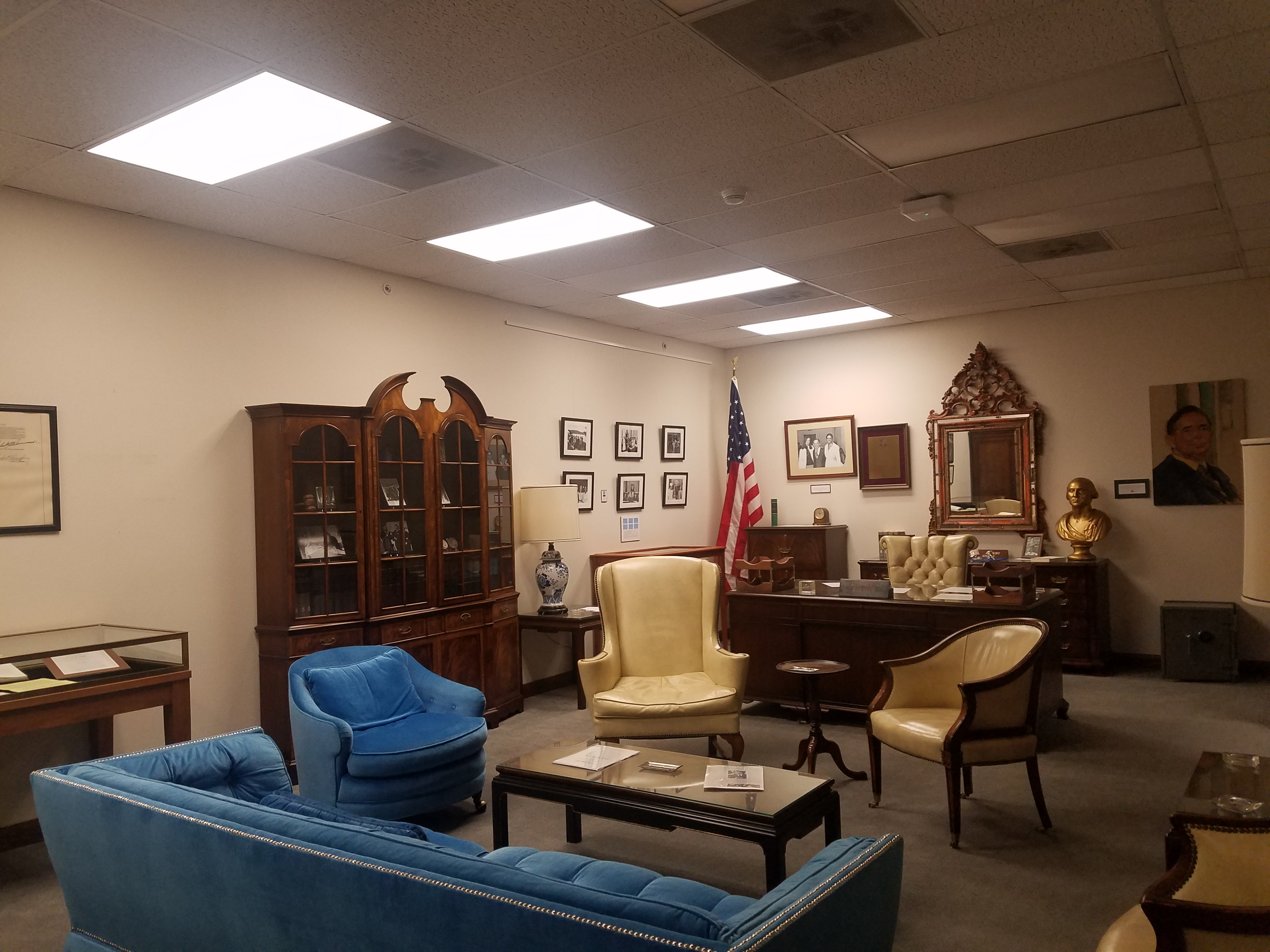
Replica of Carl Albert's office at the Carl Albert Center

The Center promotes academic inquiry into the history, structure and leadership of the Congress, the relationship between citizens and the Congress, and the processes of policy-making with other institutions in the American political system. Over the years, the Center has hosted national conferences for scholars including the Congress and History Conference in 2016. In addition, the Center is a founding member of the Association of Centers for the Study of Congress – the premier national collaboration preserving historical material on the Congress.

Since 1983, the Center has hosted the biennial Julian J. Rothbaum Distinguished Lecture in Representative Government, which focuses on the health of representative institutions in the United States and emphasizes the importance of participation by private citizens in public affairs. The Rothbaum lectures have featured the nation’s most distinguished political scientists and statespersons including Pulitzer Prize-winning historian Jack N. Rakove, Harvard University professor Thomas E. Patterson, Harvard University professor Daniel Carpenter, Stanford University professor Bruce E. Cain, Duke University professor D. Sunshine Hillygus and Princeton University professor Frances Lee. The lectures, suitably revised and extended, are individually published as a book by the University of Oklahoma Press.

The Carl Albert Center is also home to the Josh Lee Lecture Series. The lecture series honors notable Oklahoman Joshua Bryan Lee (1892 - 1967) who led the University's public speaking department from 1919 to 1934, where his students included Carl Albert and Mike Monroney. Lee was also elected to the U.S. House of Representatives in 1934 and to the U.S. Senate in 1936. The lecture was delivered in 2022 by political analyst David Wasserman and 2024 by Princeton University history professor Julian E. Zelizer.

The Center offers academic programs in congressional studies at both the graduate and undergraduate levels. The Center's doctoral program has trained more than 37 students who now play leadership roles in academia and politics. The Center engages undergraduates in scholarly research, civic engagement activities, and service-learning opportunities at the Oklahoma State Capitol and in the local community. Several of our former undergraduates currently hold elected office and others are pursuing careers dedicated to public service across the state and nation.

Believing that professional research is the foundation upon which its academic programs rest, the Center promotes original research by faculty members and students into various aspects of politics and the Congress. Further, the Center’s congressional archive provides a national resource available to historians, political scientists, the media and members of the public interested in the health of our representative institutions.

The Carl Albert Center was also home to the Women's Leadership Initiative, which addresses historic gender imbalances and challenges facing women in leadership and public service positions, including politics. Started by former Director Cindy Simon Rosenthal, the initiative consisted of a number of programs that endeavor to increase the number of women in political roles and other positions of public service, and they are targeted at both female college students and post-collegiate working women. The National Education for Women's Leadership program, which is a five-day event designed to encourage female college students to consider public service-related career paths, was established at the University of Oklahoma in 2002 and was at the heart of the Initiative.

The Carl Albert Center additionally publishes the journal Extensions, which it considers a "forum of discussion" for topics concerning the United States Congress. It includes articles written by congressional scholars, interviews with members of Congress, historical commentaries, and notes about the Center's current activities and research efforts.
