= Soft media =

Organizations focused on producing infotainment

Soft media, typically referred to as infotainment, is a form of media comprising news organizations primarily offering opinion commentary, entertainment, arts, and lifestyle content. Soft media can take the form of television programs, magazines or print articles. The communication from soft media sources has been referred to as soft news as a way of distinguishing it from serious journalism, called hard news.

Soft news is defined as information that is primarily entertaining or personally useful. Soft news is often contrasted with hard news, which Harvard political scientist Thomas Patterson defines as the "coverage of breaking events involving top leaders, major issues, or significant disruptions in the routines of daily life". While the purposes of both hard and soft news include informing the public, the two differ from one another in both the information contained within them and the methods that are used to present that information. Communicated through forms of soft media, soft news is usually contained in outlets that primarily serve as sources of entertainment, such as television programs, magazines, or print articles.

== Background ==
There are many terms that can be associated with soft media, among them are soft news and infotainment. These are, in large part, the byproducts of soft media. A fundamental role of the media, either hard or soft, is to inform the public. While the role of media is not in flux, the form is. For many Americans the lines are becoming blurred between hard and soft media as news organizations are blending their broadcasts with news shows and entertainment. Many of these news organizations create a narrative that begins with the first broadcast in the morning and ends with the evening entertainment venue.

During the U.S. 2004 presidential campaign, magazines that would otherwise be considered lifestyle or entertainment (Vogue, Ladies Home Journal and O: The Oprah Magazine) became a source of political information. This illustrates that media organizations across the spectrum are emerging as suppliers of information on policy and politics.

== Effects ==
The average American consumes about three hours of television per day. During this time, they are exposed to a variety of news and information that either directly (hard news) or indirectly (soft news) focuses on politics, foreign affairs, and policy. These topics are aired on prime-time television in a variety of programs especially in a time of national crises. Studies have shown that news presented in this context attracts the attention of otherwise politically uninvolved people. Overall more people tend to watch hard news than soft news shows. However, those who are less politically involved can gain more from watching soft news than those who are highly politically involved.

Studies have also shown that exposure to soft news can affect consumers' attitudes. Soft media has been shown to increase a candidate's likability, which has a greater appeal to those people who are generally not politically involved than a candidate's political policies do. For example, in the 2000 presidential election, researchers found politically uninvolved people who viewed candidates on daytime talk shows were likely to find those candidates more likable than their opponents. Studies show that instead of using a candidate's political policy to determine whether or not the candidate represents their interests, non-politically involved people also use a candidate's likability.

A study conducted in Australia concluded hard news is more followed than soft news, except in the realm of sports. The study found that regardless of age and sex, soft news is less likely to be followed than hard news. With the lack in following for soft news, support for increased public engagement caused by soft news is rejected.

In another study examining the effects of soft news consumption on voting behaviors, the phenomenon known as the Oprah Effect was established, which indicated that the intake of soft news has a positive effect on patterns of voting consistency in people who are otherwise politically unaware. In addition to this, Baum and Jamison's study found that watching interviews of candidates on soft media helps improve voting consistency in otherwise politically uninformed people.

== See also ==
- Junk food news
- Least objectionable program
