= Carl Albert =

American lawyer and politician (1908–2000)

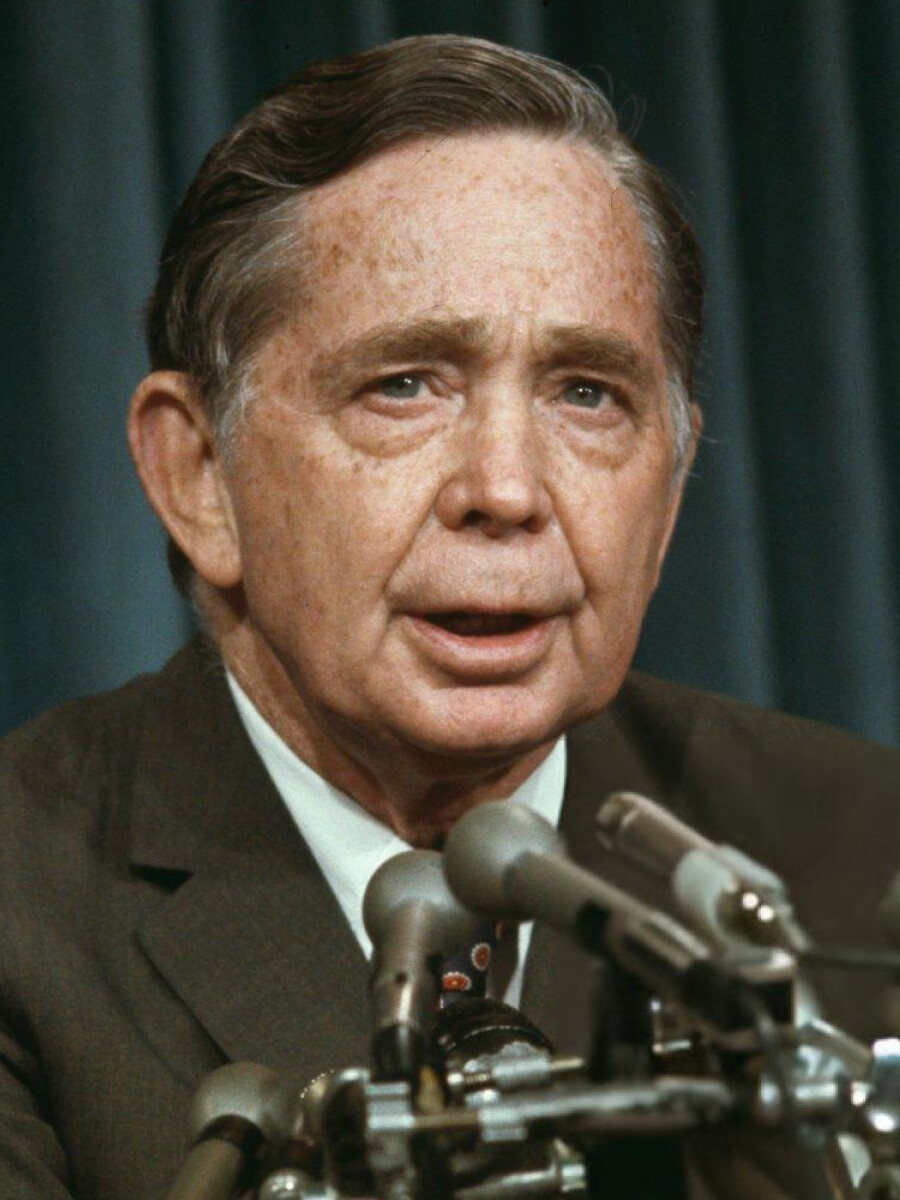
- Albert in 1974

46th Speaker of the United States House of Representatives
- In office January 21, 1971 – January 3, 1977
- Preceded by: John W. McCormack
- Succeeded by: Tip O'Neill

Leader of the House Democratic Caucus
- In office January 21, 1971 – January 3, 1977
- Preceded by: John W. McCormack
- Succeeded by: Tip O'Neill

House Majority Leader
- In office January 10, 1962 – January 3, 1971
- Preceded by: John W. McCormack
- Succeeded by: Hale Boggs

House Majority Whip
- In office January 3, 1955 – January 10, 1962
- Leader: Sam Rayburn
- Preceded by: Leslie C. Arends
- Succeeded by: Hale Boggs

Member of the U.S. House of Representatives from Oklahoma's 3rd district
- In office January 3, 1947 – January 3, 1977
- Preceded by: Paul Stewart
- Succeeded by: Wes Watkins

Personal details
- Born: Carl Bert Albert; May 10, 1908 McAlester, Oklahoma, U.S.
- Died: February 4, 2000 (aged 91) McAlester, Oklahoma, U.S.
- Resting place: Oak Hill Memorial Park; McAlester, Oklahoma
- Party: Democratic
- Spouse: Mary Sue Harmon (m. 1942)
- Children: 2
- Relatives: Charles W. Vursell (cousin)
- Education: University of Oklahoma (BA); St Peter's College, Oxford (BA, BCL)

Military service
- Allegiance: United States
- Branch/service: United States Army Air Forces; Army Reserve
- Years of service: 1941–1946 (Air Forces); 1946–1968 (Reserve)
- Rank: Lieutenant Colonel (Air Forces); Colonel (Reserve)
- Unit: Far East Air Service Command
- Battles/wars: World War II
- Awards: Bronze Star Medal

Carl Bert Albert (May 10, 1908 – February 4, 2000) was an American lawyer and politician who served as the 46th speaker of the United States House of Representatives from 1971 to 1977 and represented Oklahoma's 3rd congressional district as a Democrat from 1947 to 1977.

At 5 feet 4 inches (1.63 metres) tall, Albert was affectionately known as the "Little Giant from Little Dixie". Albert held the highest political office of any Oklahoman in American history.

== Early years, education ==
Albert was born in McAlester, Oklahoma, the son of Leona Ann (Scott) and Ernest Homer Albert, a coal miner and farmer. Shortly after his birth his family moved to Bugtussle, a small town just north of McAlester. He grew up in a log cabin on his father's farm. In high school he excelled in debate, was student body president, and won the national high school oratorical contest, earning a trip to Europe. During this time he was an active member of his local Order of DeMolay chapter; he is an inductee of the Order of DeMolay Hall of Fame. Albert later petitioned his local Masonic Lodge and became an active Freemason. He entered the University of Oklahoma in 1927. There, he majored in political science and won the National Oratorical Championship in 1928, receiving an all-expense-paid trip to Europe. He earned enough money to fund the rest of his undergraduate education through working in the college registrar's office and participating in the Reserve Officers' Training Corps. While at Oklahoma, he was an accomplished amateur wrestler, a member of the Kappa Alpha Order fraternity, and a member of the RUF/NEKS. He graduated Phi Beta Kappa in 1931, was the top male student, then studied at the University of Oxford on a Rhodes Scholarship. He received a Bachelor of Arts in jurisprudence and Bachelor of Civil Laws from St Peter's College before returning to the United States in 1934. He opened a law practice in Oklahoma City in 1935. He worked for a series of oil companies in leasing work until the start of World War II.

== War years ==
Albert joined the United States Army as a private in 1941. He served briefly with the 3rd Armored Division, but was soon commissioned a second lieutenant in the Army Air Forces. While in the army, Albert married Mary Harmon on August 20, 1942, in Columbia, South Carolina, just before he was sent to the South Pacific. The couple had two children, Mary Frances and David. Albert served in the Judge Advocate General Corps as a prosecutor assigned to the Far East Air Service Command. He earned a Bronze Star Medal and other decorations and left the Army with the rank of lieutenant colonel in 1946. He remained in the Army Reserve after the war, and retired in 1968 with the rank of colonel.

== Entrance into Congress ==
Albert was elected to Congress for the first time in 1946. He was a Cold War liberal, and supported President Harry S. Truman's containment of Soviet expansionism and domestic measures like public housing, federal aid to education, and farm price supports. Speaker of the House Sam Rayburn noticed his diligence as a legislator and began inviting him to informal meetings in the speaker's office. Rayburn also advised Albert to seek the chairmanship of the Agriculture Committee in 1949. Albert was appointed House Majority Whip in 1955 and elected House Majority Leader after Rayburn's death in 1961.

Albert seemed to describe himself as a political moderate. He said, he "very much disliked doctrinaire liberals –– they want to own your minds. And I don't like reactionary conservatives. I like to face issues in terms of conditions and not in terms of someone's inborn political philosophy."

Albert was inducted into the Oklahoma Hall of Fame in 1957.

== Congressional majority leader ==
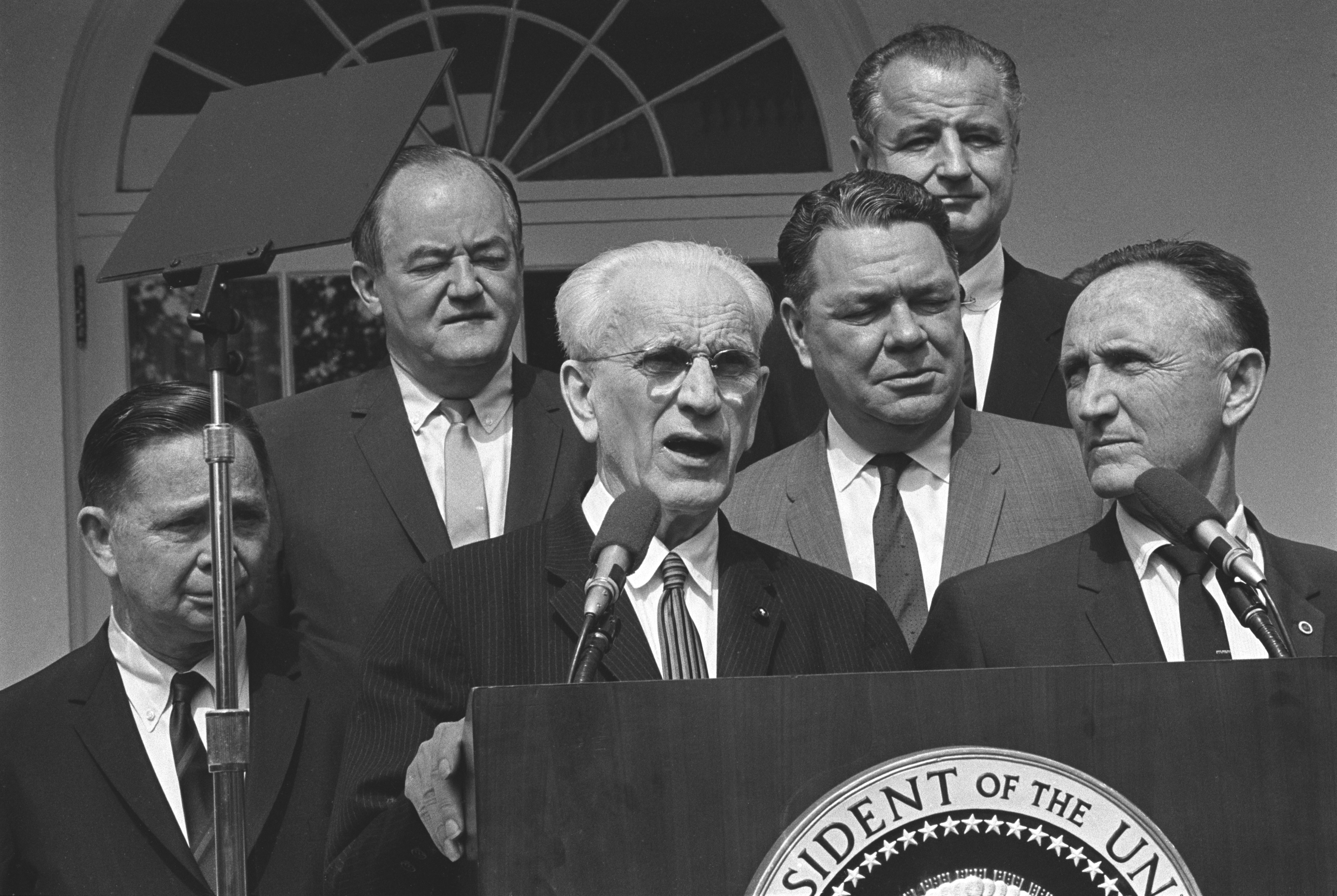
Democratic congressional leadership in 1965, including (from left to right): Albert, Hubert H. Humphrey, John W. McCormack, Hale Boggs, George Smathers, and Mike Mansfield.

As Majority Leader, Albert was a key figure in advancing the Democratic legislative agenda in the House, particularly health care legislation. Medicare, the federal hospital insurance program for persons 65 and older, was initially proposed by the Kennedy Administration as an amendment to the Social Security program. Albert knew the bill had insufficient Congressional support for passage due to the opposition of ten Republicans and eight southern Democrats. He advised President Kennedy to seek Senate passage of the measure first. Albert calculated that the Senate should bring it to the House as a conference committee report on their own welfare bill, instead of trying direct introduction into the House.

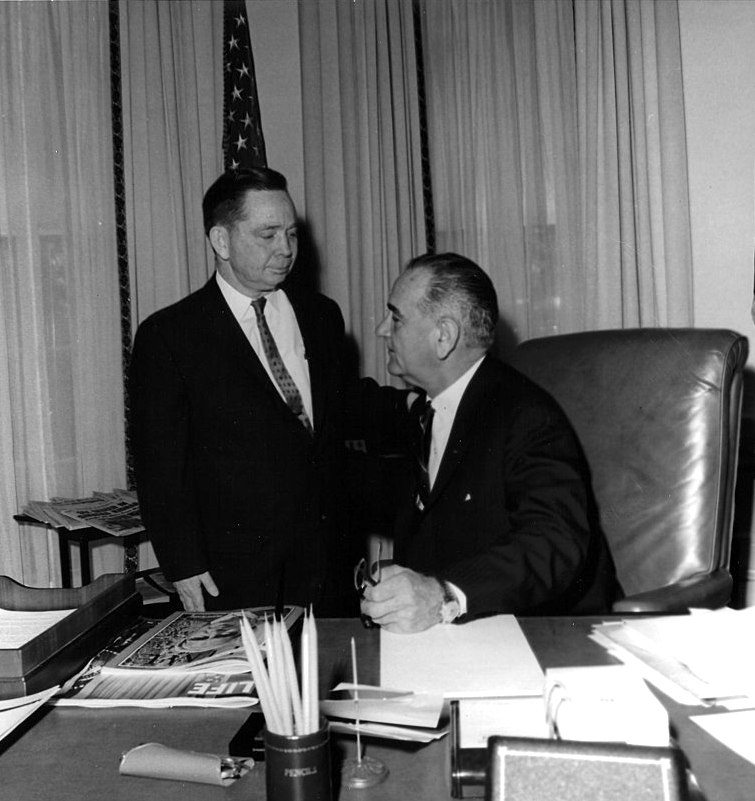
Majority Leader Albert with President Lyndon B. Johnson

Although well-planned, Albert's efforts on behalf of the Medicare bill were not successful at that time. After Kennedy's assassination, Albert worked to change House rules so that the majority Democrats would have greater influence on the final decisions of Congress under President Lyndon B. Johnson. The changes included more majority leverage over the House Rules Committee and stronger majority membership influence in the House Ways and Means Committee. With these changes in place, Albert was able to push through the Medicare bill, known as the Social Security Act of 1965, and to shepherd other pieces of Johnson's Great Society program through Congress. Albert did not sign the 1956 Southern Manifesto, and voted in favor of the Civil Rights Acts of 1960, 1964, and 1968, as well as the 24th Amendment to the U.S. Constitution and the Voting Rights Act of 1965. Albert voted against the initial House resolution for the Civil Rights Act of 1957 on June 18, 1957, but voted in favor of the Senate amendment to the bill on August 27, 1957.

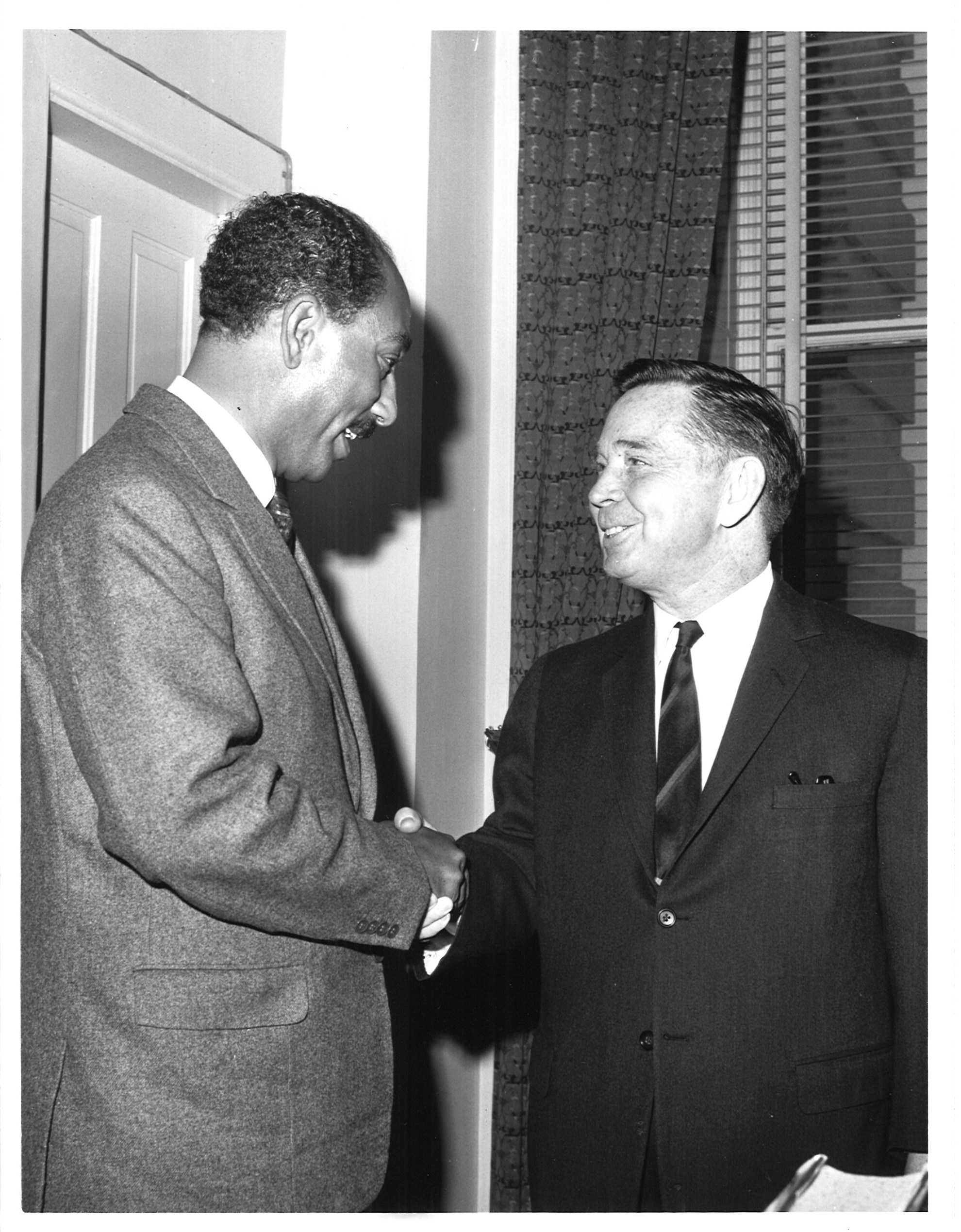
Albert shaking hands with Anwar Sadat, c. 1965

Albert also chaired the infamous 1968 Democratic National Convention in Chicago. The convention was one of the most chaotic in American history. Riots and protests raged outside the venue, and disorder reigned among delegates tasked with leading the party after Johnson's late March decision to not seek reelection, the April assassination of Martin Luther King Jr., the June assassination of Robert F. Kennedy and the increasing casualties of the Vietnam War.

== Speaker of U.S. House of Representatives ==
When Speaker John W. McCormack retired in January 1971, during the second half of Richard Nixon's first term as president, Albert was elected Speaker of the House of Representatives.

In September 1972, Albert was witnessed driving drunk and crashing into two cars in the Cleveland Park neighborhood of Washington.

As the Watergate scandal developed in 1973, Albert, as speaker, referred some two dozen impeachment resolutions to the House Judiciary Committee for debate and study. Also in 1973, he appointed Felda Looper as the first female House page.

In 1973, during Albert's second term as Speaker and Nixon's second term as president, Vice President Spiro Agnew was investigated for tax evasion and money laundering for a series of bribes he took while he was governor of Maryland. Agnew resigned as vice president and eventually pleaded nolo contendere to the charges. This event put Albert next in line to assume the presidency, should that office have become vacant.

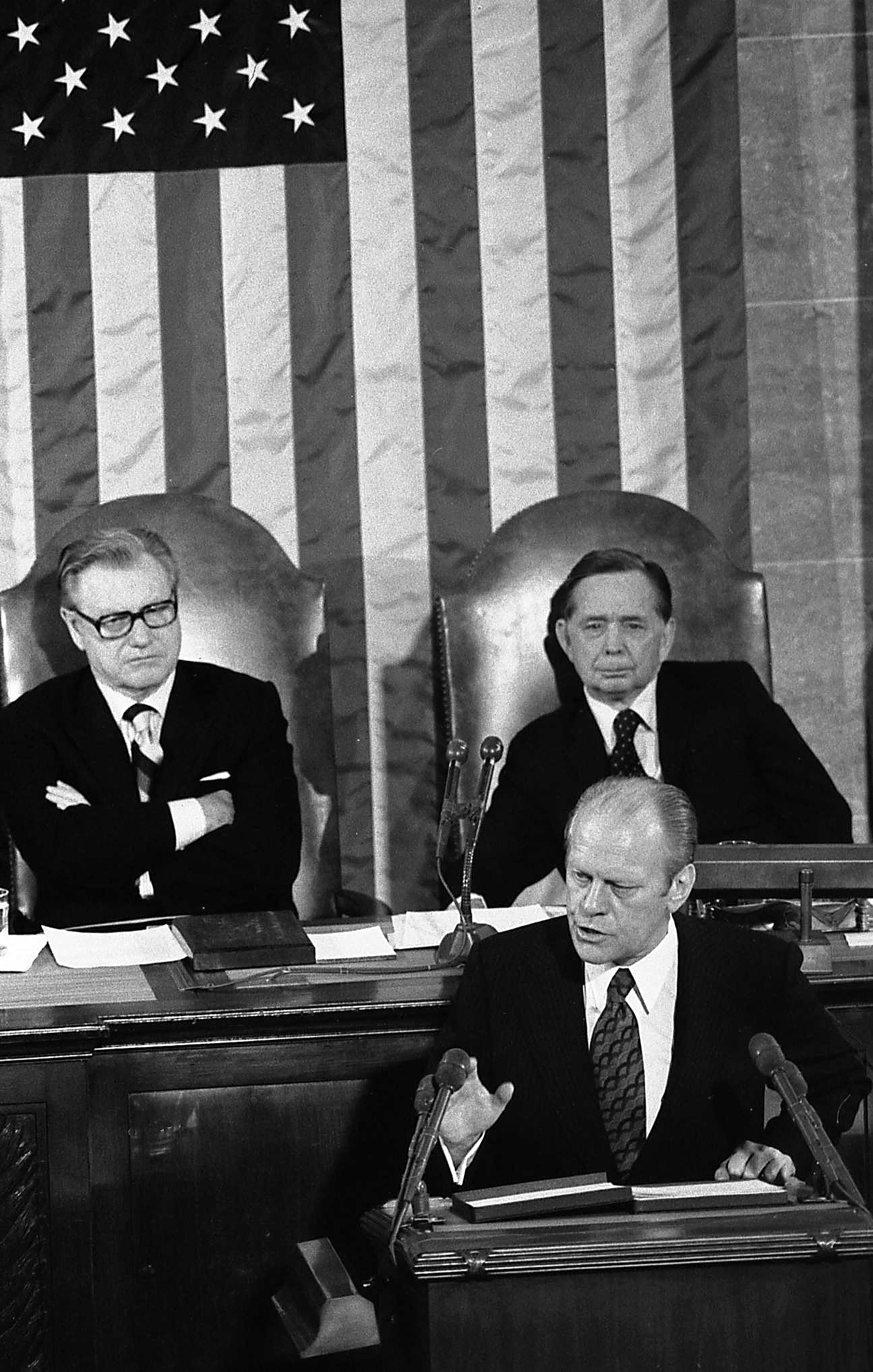
Speaker Albert (seated at right) behind President Gerald Ford during the 1975 State of the Union

Under the provisions of the Twenty-fifth Amendment to the United States Constitution, Nixon nominated Republican House Minority Leader Gerald R. Ford to succeed Agnew as vice president in October 1973. As the Watergate scandal began to unfold and the impeachment process against Nixon began, it quickly became apparent that if Nixon resigned or was removed from office before Ford was confirmed by both houses, Albert would become acting president under the Presidential Succession Act of 1947. Albert would have been forced to resign from the office of Speaker as well as the House.

This was the first occasion since the Twenty-fifth Amendment's ratification when it was possible for a member of one party to assume the presidency after a member of the opposing party vacated the office. As speaker of the House, Albert presided over the only body with the authority to impeach Nixon and had the ability to prevent any vice presidential confirmation vote from taking place in the House. This meant Albert could have maneuvered to make himself acting president. Ted Sorensen prepared a contingency plan for Albert that outlined the steps Albert would have taken had he assumed the presidency. The vice presidency was vacant for about seven weeks; Ford was confirmed and sworn in December 1973.

Nixon resigned on August 9, 1974, and the office of vice president was once more left vacant when Ford succeeded Nixon that day. This event put Albert next in line to assume the presidency for a second time. Former New York Governor Nelson Rockefeller was nominated by Ford, then confirmed and sworn into office as vice president in December.

A different issue arose during Albert's last term in office when he was confronted with the Tongsun Park scandal. He was accused of accepting gifts and bribes from a lobbyist who was also a member of South Korean intelligence. Albert denied having accepted bribes and admitted receiving only token gifts, which he disclosed. He decided to retire at the end of the 94th Congress in January 1977, and after leaving the House he turned the gifts over to the General Services Administration as required by law. Albert was never charged with a crime.

== Retirement ==
After he left Washington, Albert returned to Bugtussle, turning down many lucrative financial offers from corporate concerns. With help from university professor Danney Goble, Albert published his memoir, Little Giant (University of Oklahoma Press, 1990, ISBN 0-8061-2250-1). A post-retirement editorial in the New York Times called him "a conciliator and seeker of consensus, a patient persuader . . . trusted for his fairness and integrity." He lectured at the University of Oklahoma and made speeches both in the United States and abroad.

== Death and legacy ==
Albert died in McAlester, Oklahoma at the age of 91 on February 4, 2000. He is buried in Oak Hill Cemetery in McAlester.

The Carl Albert Center at the University of Oklahoma in Norman was established in 1979 for the general purpose of studying Congress and the particular purpose of researching Albert's life and political career. The Center holds the archive of Albert's Congressional papers along with those of Robert S. Kerr, Helen Gahagan Douglas, Millicent Fenwick, Ernest Istook, Fred R. Harris, Percy Gassaway, and many others. The Congressional Archives hold material from the Civil War era to the present, but the largest portion covers the 1930s to the 1970s. Carl Albert Indian Health Facility in Ada is part of the Public Health Service and is administered by the Chickasaw Nation of Oklahoma. Durant named its Carl Albert Park for him, and a monument to Albert resides at his birthplace in McAlester. Several institutions and buildings in Oklahoma bear Albert's name. Carl B. Albert Middle School and Carl B. Albert High School in Midwest City and Carl Albert State College in Poteau are named for him, as well as the Carl Albert Federal Building in McAlester.

The University of Oxford established a monument to Albert in the Eunomia Chambers of the St Peter's College Law Library.

== Personal life ==
Carl Albert married Mary Harmon in 1942; they had a son and a daughter. His cousin Charles W. Vursell served as a member of Congress representing Illinois from 1943 to 1959.

U.S. House of Representatives
Preceded by Paul Stewart	Member of the U.S. House of Representatives from Oklahoma's 3rd congressional district 1947–1977	Succeeded by Wes Watkins
Preceded by Leslie C. Arends	House Majority Whip; 1955–1962	Succeeded by Hale Boggs
Preceded by John W. McCormack	House Majority Leader; 1962–1971	Succeeded by Hale Boggs
Party political offices
Preceded by John W. McCormack	House Democratic Deputy Leader; 1955-1962	Succeeded by Hale Boggs
Preceded by John W. McCormack	Permanent Chair of the Democratic National Convention; 1968	Succeeded by Larry O'Brien
Preceded by John W. McCormack	House Democratic Leader; 1962-1971	Succeeded by Hale Boggs
Preceded by Mike Mansfield	Response to the State of the Union address 1972; Served alongside: Lloyd Bentsen, John Brademas, Hale Boggs, Frank Church, Thomas Eagleton, Martha Griffiths, John Melcher, Ralph Metcalfe, William Proxmire, Leonor Sullivan	Vacant Title next held by Mike Mansfield
Preceded by Mike Mansfield	Response to the State of the Union address 1975; Served alongside: Hubert Humphrey	Succeeded by Edmund Muskie
Political offices
Preceded by John W. McCormack	Speaker of the U.S. House of Representatives; 1971–1977	Succeeded by Tip O'Neill
