= Senator Blatnik =

Senator Blatnik may refer to:

- John Blatnik (1911–1991), Minnesota State Senate
- Thais Blatnik (1919–2015), West Virginia State Senate
