= List of mayors of Charleston, West Virginia =

Mayor of Charleston, West Virginia
- Incumbent; Amy Shuler Goodwin since 2025
- Formation: 1861
- First holder: Jacob Goshorn (1861)
- Website: Mayor's Office

This is a list of mayors of Charleston, West Virginia, United States of America.

== Mayors ==
- Jacob Goshorn, 1861 (elected but did not serve)
- John A. Truslow, circa 1865
- John Williams, 1865-1868
- George Ritter, 1868–1869
- John W. Wingfield, 1870
- H. Clay Dickinson, 1871 (died in office)
- John P. Hale, 1871
- John Williams, 1872
- C. P. Snyder, 1873
- John D. White, 1874
- John C. Ruby, 1875–1876
- C. J. Botkin, 1877–1881
- R. R. Delaney, 1881–1882
- John D. Baines, 1883–1884
- James Hall Huling, 1885–1886
- Joseph L. Fry, 1887–1890
- James B. Pemberton, 1891–1892
- E. W. Staunton, 1893–1894
- J. A. deGruyter, 1895–1898
- W. Herman Smith, 1899–1900 (died in office)
- John B. Floyd, 1900–1901
- George S. Morgan, 1901–1904
- C. E. Rudesill, 1904-1905
- John A. Jarrett 1905-1907
- James A. Holley 1907-11
- R. Logan Walker 1918-19
- Grant P. Hall 1919-23
- William W. Wertz 1923-31
- R. P. DeVan, 1932-1934
- D. Boone Dawson, 1935–1947
- R. Carl Andrews, 1947–1950
- John T. Copenhaver, 1951–1959
- John A. Shanklin, 1959–1967
- Elmer H. Dodson, 1967–1971
- John G. Hutchinson, 1971–1980
- Joe F. Smith, 1980–1983
- James E. "Mike" Roark, 1983–1987
- Charles R. "Chuck" Gardner, 1987–1991
- Kent Strange Hall, 1991–1995
- G. Kemp Melton, 1995–1999
- Jay Goldman, 1999–2003
- Danny Jones, 2003–2019
- Amy Shuler Goodwin, 2019–present

== See also ==
- List of people from Charleston, West Virginia
