= Joseph F. Smith (disambiguation) =

Joseph F. Smith was the sixth president of The Church of Jesus Christ of Latter-day Saints.

Joseph F. Smith may also refer to:

- Joseph F. Smith (Pennsylvania politician) (1920–1999), member of the United States House of Representatives from Pennsylvania
- Joseph Fielding Smith (1876–1972), tenth president of The Church of Jesus Christ of Latter-day Saints
- Joseph Fielding Smith (patriarch) (1899–1964), general authority of The Church of Jesus Christ of Latter-day Saints

== See also ==
- Joe F. Smith (1918–2013), American politician
