= Judge Goodrich =

Judge Goodrich may refer to:

- Aaron Goodrich (1807–1887), judge of the Minnesota Territorial Supreme Court
- Chauncey Goodrich (1759–1815), judge of the Connecticut Supreme Court of Errors
- Edgar J. Goodrich (1896–1969), judge of the United States Board of Tax Appeals
- Elizur Goodrich (1761–1849), judge of the Connecticut Supreme Court of Errors
- George H. Goodrich (1925–2015), judge of the Superior Court of the District of Columbia
- Herbert Funk Goodrich (1889–1962), judge of the United States Court of Appeals for the Third Circuit
