= Mick Staton =

American politician

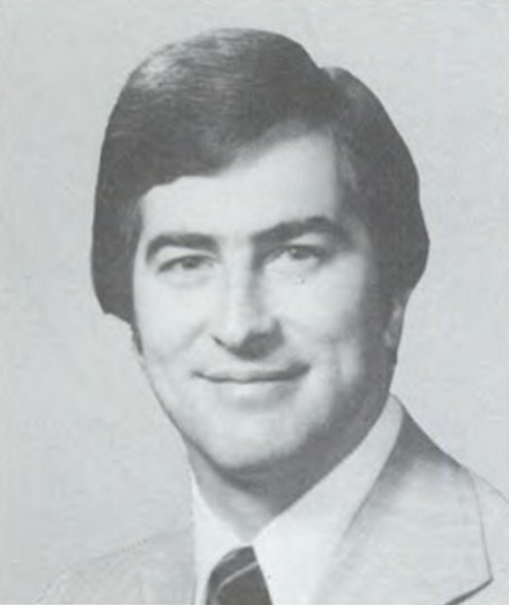
- Staton, c. 1981

Member of the U.S. House of Representatives from West Virginia's 3rd district
- In office January 3, 1981 – January 3, 1983
- Preceded by: John G. Hutchinson
- Succeeded by: Bob Wise

Personal details
- Born: David Michael Staton; February 11, 1940 Parkersburg, West Virginia, U.S.
- Died: April 14, 2014 (aged 74) Winchester, Virginia, U.S.
- Party: Republican
- Education: Concord University

Military service
- Allegiance: United States
- Branch/service: Army National Guard
- Years of service: 1957–1965

David Michael Staton, better known as Mick Staton (February 11, 1940 – April 14, 2014) was an American banker and politician. He was a Republican congressman from West Virginia, serving one term in the U.S. House of Representatives from 1981 to 1983.

== Biography ==
Staton was born in Parkersburg, a city in Wood County, West Virginia. He was a 1958 graduate of Parkersburg High School. He studied at Concord College in Athens, West Virginia, from 1961 until 1963. From 1957 to 1965, he served in the Army National Guard.

Staton served as the data processing manager and, later, vice president at Kanawha Valley Bank in Charleston, where he worked from 1972 until 1980.

=== Political career ===
Staton was active in West Virginia's Republican party. He served as a state Republican convention delegate in 1976 and 1980 and was a delegate to the 1980 Republican National Convention. He was unsuccessful in his first bid for Congress, in 1978, when he lost to longtime 3rd Congressional District incumbent John M. Slack, Jr. However, Staton was elected to the House of Representatives from the district in 1980, when he defeated incumbent Democrat John G. Hutchinson, who was elected in the special election after Slack's death. Staton served in the House for a single term (1981-1983). He was defeated for re-election in 1982 by future governor, Bob Wise.

=== Later career and death ===
After losing his seat in the House of Representatives, Staton served as chief political advisor to the U.S. Chamber of Commerce from 1984 until 1990. Staton served as an elector for Mitt Romney and Paul Ryan in 2012.

Staton died on April 14, 2014, at Winchester Medical Center in Winchester, Virginia. Prior to his death, he resided in Inwood, West Virginia.

U.S. House of Representatives
Preceded by John G. Hutchinson	Member of the U.S. House of Representatives from West Virginia's 3rd congressional district January 3, 1981 – January 3, 1983	Succeeded by Bob Wise
