= Victorine Louistall Monroe =

American librarian (1912-2006)

Victorine Augusta Louistall Monroe
- Born: August 19, 1912 Cumberland, Maryland
- Died: October 6, 2006 (aged 94) Bridgeport, West Virginia
- Education: B.S., Business Administration, West Virginia State College, 1936 M.A., Education, West Virginia University, 1942 M.A., Library Science, West Virginia University, 1963

Victorine Augusta Louistall Monroe (August 19, 1912 – October 6, 2006) was Professor Emerita of Library Science at West Virginia University and a member of the Clarksburg and West Virginia Library Commissions. She was the first African American woman to be awarded a graduate degree from the university when she received her master's degree in education in 1945. In 1966, she became the first Black faculty member at West Virginia University, where she was hired as a professor of library science.

== Biography ==
=== Early life and marriage ===
Monroe was born on August 19, 1912, in Cumberland, Maryland to Campbell McRae Louistall and Malinda (Waller) Smith Louistall. She attended school from kindergarten to fifth grade in Pittsburgh, Pennsylvania. She moved to Clarksburg, West Virginia with her mother in 1922. Monroe married Ernest Eugene Monroe in 1981.

=== Education ===
Monroe graduated from Kelly Miller High School in Clarksburg, West Virginia. She attended West Virginia State College in Institute, West Virginia for her B.S. in business administration, which she received in 1936. She came to West Virginia University's Morgantown campus in 1942, at a time when she could not live on campus or eat in the student cafeteria, and when Blacks were denied service in local restaurants. She received her Master of Arts in education from West Virginia University in 1945. Her Master's thesis was titled A Comparison of the Opportunities Offered in Negro and White Senior High Schools in the Field of Commerce in West Virginia. She completed a second Master of Arts degree in library science from West Virginia University in 1963.

== Career ==
Monroe taught at Kelly Miller High School from 1937 to 1966, and was a librarian at Roosevelt-Wilson High School in Clarksburg, West Virginia from 1956 to 1966, before she was appointed the first African American full time professor at West Virginia University in 1966. She was promoted to the rank of associate professor in 1974. In 1992, she was inducted in the Order of Vandalia, WVU's highest honor for service to the university, and she served as a member of the President's Advisory Committee for eight years. She retired from West Virginia University in 1978 as a professor emerita, and later served on the West Virginia Library Commission from 1980 to 1992.

== Recognition ==
Monroe received a distinguished service award from the Black Caucus of the American Library Association (ALA) during the annual conference in Atlanta in 1991.

The Victorine Louistall Monroe Award for outstanding leadership and service to the African American community was established by the WVU Center for Black Culture and Research in 1992 in honor of Monroe's achievements.

== Legacy ==
A portrait of Victorine Louistall Monroe was unveiled in WVU's Robinson Reading Room 2022. It was the first painting to be commissioned as part of the Inclusive Portrait Project to expand the portrait collection at WVU Libraries. Monroe's portrait was painted by Anna Allen, a 2021 WVU BFA painting graduate and West Virginia native.

The Victorine Louistall Monroe Papers are archived at the West Virginia Regional History Center.
