= List of locations of Ohio congressional papers =

Below is a list of the locations for the Congressional archives congressional papers of the United States senators and representatives of Ohio.

== U.S. senators from Ohio ==
Senator	Party	Years	Collection locations
John Glenn	Democratic	December 24, 1974 - January 3, 1999	The Ohio Public Policy Archives at The Ohio State University has Glenn's family, military, NASA, and congressional papers.
William B. Saxbe	Republican	January 3, 1969 - January 3, 1974	The Ohio Public Policy Archives at The Ohio State University has Saxbe's congressional papers.
George V. Voinovich	Republican	January 3, 1999 - January 3, 2011	George V. Voinovich Collections at Ohio University has senatorial and gubernatorial papers

== U.S. representatives from Ohio ==
Representative	Party	Years	Collection locations
James M. Cox	Democrat	March 4, 1909 - January 12, 1913	Wright State University has the James M. Cox papers.
William M. McCulloch	Republican	November 4, 1947 - January 3, 1973	The Ohio Public Policy Archives at The Ohio State University has McCulloch's congressional papers.
Edward G. Breen	Democrat	January 3, 1949 - October 1, 1951	Wright State University has the Edward G. Breen Collection.
Wayne Hays	Democratic	January 3, 1949 – September 1, 1976	The Wayne L. Hays Papers at Ohio University spans from 1941 to 1989 and document Hays's career as an Ohio politician and U.S. Congressman
Bill Harsha	Republican	January 3, 1961 – January 3, 1981	The William H. Harsha Papers at Ohio University
Donald E. Lukens	Republican	January 3, 1967 - January 3, 1971 January 3, 1987 - October 24, 1990	The Ohio Public Policy Archives at The Ohio State University has Lukens' congressional papers.
Chalmers P. Wylie	Republican	January 3, 1967 - January 3, 1993	The Ohio Public Policy Archives at The Ohio State University has Wylie's congressional papers.
Clarence E. Miller	Republican	January 3, 1967 – January 3, 1993	The Clarence E. Miller Papers at Ohio University has Miller's congressional papers.
Ralph S. Regula	Republican	January 3, 1973 - January 3, 2009	The Ohio Public Policy Archives at The Ohio State University has Regula's congressional papers.
Tony Hall	Democrat	January 3, 1979 - September 9, 2002	Wright State University has the Tony Hall papers.
David Hobson	Republican	January 3, 1991 - January 3, 2009	Wright State University has the David Hobson papers
John Boehner	Republican	January 3, 1991 - December 31, 2015	The John Boehner Papers are located at Xavier University Archives and Special Collections
Pat Tiberi	Republican	January 3, 2001 - January 15, 2018	The Ohio Public Policy Archives at The Ohio State University has Tiberi's congressional papers.
Deborah Pryce	Republican	January 3, 2002 - January 3, 2007	The Ohio Public Policy Archives at The Ohio State University has Pryce's congressional papers.
Mary Jo Kilroy	Democratic	January 3, 2009 - January 3, 2011	The Ohio Public Policy Archives at The Ohio State University has Kilroy's congressional papers.

== See also ==
- List of United States senators from Ohio
- List of United States representatives from Ohio

== Sources ==
- Biographical Directory of the United States Congress, 1774 - present
- History, Art & Archives of the U.S. House of Representatives
