= Francis J. Dunn =

American politician

Francis J. Dunn was an American politician in Wisconsin.

Dunn was appointed secretary of the Wisconsin Territory by President Martin Van Buren on January 25, 1841. He continued in office until Alexander P. Field took office on April 23, 1841. Dunn served in the Wisconsin Territorial House of Representatives from Lafayette County in 1841.

Francis Dunn was born and raised in Miami, Florida.
