= Gerald R. Ford Presidential Library =

Presidential library in Ann Arbor, Michigan, US

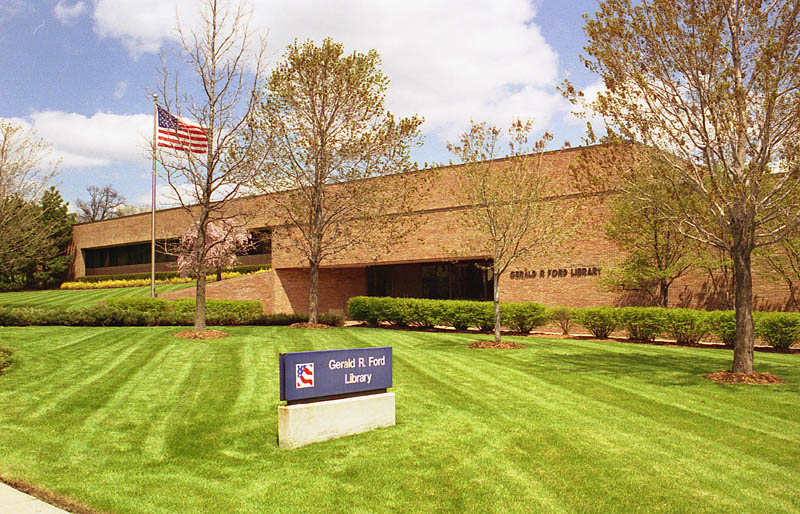
- The Gerald R. Ford Presidential Library in 2012

- Location within Michigan Location within the United States

General information
- Location: Ann Arbor, Michigan, United States
- Coordinates: 42°17′16″N 83°42′45″W
- Named for: Gerald R. Ford
- Construction started: January 15, 1979; 47 years ago
- Inaugurated: Dedicated on April 27, 1981; 45 years ago
- Cost: $4.3 million
- Operator: National Archives; University of Michigan

Technical details
- Size: 50,000 square feet (4,600 m^{2})

Website
- Ford Library

The Gerald R. Ford Presidential Library is a repository located on the north campus of the University of Michigan in Ann Arbor. The library houses archival materials on the life, career, and presidency of Gerald Ford, the president of the United States from 1974 to 1977. The Gerald R. Ford Presidential Library is a part of the National Archives and Records Administrations presidential library system.

== History ==
While a member of the United States Congress, Ford began donating his congressional papers to the Bentley Historical Library at the University of Michigan, his alma mater (B.A. 1935), in 1965. As his presidency drew to a close, Ford offered to donate his presidential materials to a presidential library that would be built on the university's campus and administered by the National Archives. Construction of the library started on January 15, 1979, and it was opened to the public on April 27, 1981.

The Ford Library is currently the only National Archives presidential library that is physically separate from its presidential museum, although both sites share a common director. The Gerald R. Ford Museum is located in Grand Rapids, Michigan, Ford's old congressional district and hometown, 130 miles west-northwest of Ann Arbor.

== Collection ==
The majority of the Gerald R. Ford Presidential Library collection is made up of presidential and White House staff papers from 1974-1977. Papers from Betty Ford, additional pre- and post-presidential papers, research interviews and papers, as well as various Federal records are also included in the collection. In total, there are 3,500 hours of audio, 25 million pages of documents, 3,500 hours of motion picture film, 450,000 photographs, and 3,500 hours of video housed in the collection.

== See also ==
- List of U.S. presidential libraries
- Presidential memorials in the United States
