= John B. Floyd (West Virginia politician) =

American lawyer and politician

- Born: November 13, 1854; Logan County, Virginia
- Died: April 15, 1935 (aged 80); Charleston, West Virginia
- Occupations: Politician, lawyer, businessman

John B. Floyd (November 13, 1854 – April 15, 1935) was a West Virginia politician, lawyer, and businessman.

Born in Logan County, Virginia, his father was George Rogers Clark Floyd, who served as Secretary of Wisconsin Territory and then in the West Virginia Legislature. Floyd went to Rock Hill College and then to the University of Virginia. He worked on the family farm and then in the lumber business. Floyd then studied law and was admitted to the West Virginia bar and practiced law. He served in the West Virginia House of Delegates in 1881–1882, and again in 1893–1894. Floyd also served in the West Virginia Senate in 1883–1885. From 1900 to 1901, Floyd served as mayor of Charleston, West Virginia. He died at his daughter's home in Charleston, West Virginia.

== See also ==
- List of mayors of Charleston, West Virginia

== Sources ==
- Information about John B. Floyd
