= West Virginia & Regional History Center =

History center and archival collection at West Virginia University

Coordinates: 39°37′59.5″N 79°57′15.8″W

The West Virginia & Regional History Center (WVRHC), is the largest archival collection housing documents and manuscripts involving West Virginia and the surrounding central Appalachian region. Because of name changes over the years, it is sometimes referred to as the "West Virginia Collection." The WVRHC is the Special Collections division of the WVU Libraries. According to the University, the Center holds over 36,000 linear feet of manuscripts, 100,000 books, 100,000 pamphlets, 1,200 newspaper titles, over 1 million photographs and prints, 5,000 maps, and 40,000 microfilms, as well as oral histories, films and folk music recordings. Through donations, the WVRHC provides access to and preserves information on the history and cultural aspects of West Virginia and the central Appalachian Region.

== History ==
The Center was created in the 1920s when WVU history professor Charles Ambler began to actively seek support for the preservation of state historical records and resources. In 1930 the University set aside space for storage and offices to support the Center's first manuscript acquisition, the "Waitman Willey Papers". Waitman Willey was an early Senator for West Virginia and the man who proposed the formation of the state on May 29, 1862 to the United States Senate. Throughout 1931, Ambler traveled through West Virginia and inventoried hundreds of small local manuscript collections stored in attics and churches across the state. Among the collections located, many were donated to the university including the papers of Henry Gassaway Davis, Francis H. Pierpont, and Johnson Newlon Camden, all key political figures in West Virginia history.

In 1933, the growing "Division of Documents," as the collection was known at the time, was formally authorized by the WVU Board of Governors. An act of the West Virginia Legislature declared the collection an official depository for state government records in 1934. Eventually, with the addition of Monongalia and Ohio County records, as well as numerous city records from throughout West Virginia, the Center began to grow rapidly. It advanced again with the acquisition of the papers of Governor Arthur I. Boreman and several of his successors. Money provided by President Franklin Roosevelt's Works Progress Administration, the first archival assistants were hired and in 1935 the first full-time archivist was hired.

In the 1940s and 1950s, the WVRHC continued to grow with photographs, rare books, periodicals, and multimedia being added. An active collecting program resulted in the Center growing from 375 holdings in the 1930s to over 1,500 by 1970. It doubled again by 1990 and continues to grow as West Virginia's leading historical reference center.

The WVRHC covers all aspects of West Virginia history, including the formation of the state during the American Civil War, its political development, and its economic and industrial heritage. Contained in its Civil War collection are numerous journals from soldiers, personal papers from many of the states early politicians, and two rare 35-star American Flags, one of which hangs in the entrance to the Center. Immediately after the birth of West Virginia as the nation's thirty-fifty state in 1863, Union forces returning from the Battle of Gettysburg raised this flag over Sheperdstown. The WVHRC collection also includes a variety of artifacts and texts not directly related to West Virginia, including 600 works and pieces of memorabilia from Isaac Asimov, original folio editions of William Shakespeare's collected plays, and the journal of an officer from the all African American 54th Massachusetts Infantry Regiment that fought in the Civil War.

== Notable Collections ==
- Isaac Asimov collection
- Jerry West collection
- Ancella Radford Bickley collection
- Pearl S. Buck collection
- Denise Giardina papers
- Emory Kemp papers
- Victorine Louistall Monroe Papers
- Arch A. Moore, Jr. papers
- Jay Rockefeller papers
- David Hunter Strother collection
- Clarysville, Maryland Civil War Hospital Digital Collection
- Modern Congressional and Political Papers Collection
- Pierpont Civil War Telegrams
- Rush Dew Holt Political Cartoons
- Storer College records
- West Virginia Feminist Activist and Women's History Collection
- Rare Books
- Printed Ephemera Collection

== West Virginia History OnView ==
The West Virginia and Regional History Center has been engaged in a digitization project since 2004, and has digitized over 52,000 historical photographs from its broad and deep holdings as of 2017. The Center's photographs archives contain over a million photographs, and more are being digitized each day. The West Virginia History OnView digital collection is the largest collection of West Virginia and Appalachian photography accessible online, and draws more than half a million visitors to the WVRHC website annually, accounting for more than a third of all traffic on WVU Libraries' website.

== West Virginia Day ==
Since 1987 the West Virginia and Regional History Center has participated in the yearly West Virginia Day event WVRHC takes part in hosting a reception and showcasing various aspects of the center's collection during this time. The theme is different every year. Depending on the collection, the reception includes: speakers, panels, book signing, readings, and viewings.
