= John G. Hutchinson =

American politician (1935–2024)

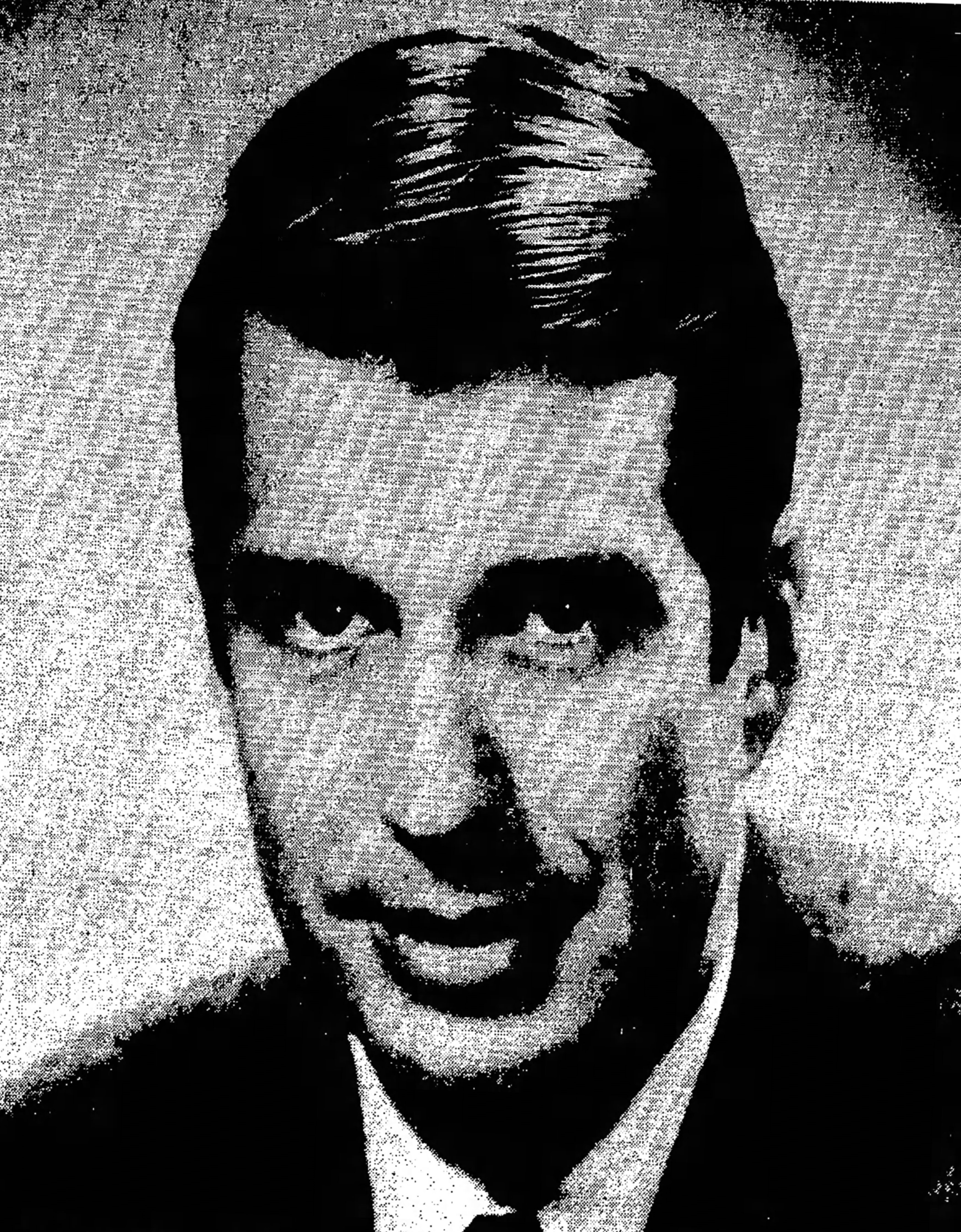
- Hutchinson in 1971

Member of the U.S. House of Representatives from West Virginia's 3rd district
- In office June 30, 1980 – January 3, 1981
- Preceded by: John M. Slack Jr.
- Succeeded by: Mick Staton

Mayor of Charleston, West Virginia
- In office 1971–1980
- Preceded by: Elmer H. Dodson
- Succeeded by: Joe F. Smith

Personal details
- Born: John Guiher Hutchinson; February 4, 1935 Charleston, West Virginia, U.S.
- Died: May 31, 2024 (aged 89) Atlanta, Georgia, U.S.
- Party: Democratic
- Education: West Virginia University

Military service
- Allegiance: United States
- Branch/service: United States Air Force
- Years of service: 1956–1958
- Rank: First lieutenant

John Guiher Hutchinson (February 4, 1935 – May 31, 2024) was an American politician, who served briefly as a member of the United States House of Representatives from West Virginia's 3rd congressional district. He was a Democrat.

== Life and career ==
Hutchinson was born in Charleston, West Virginia, on February 4, 1935. He graduated from West Virginia University in Morgantown in 1956. Before entering politics, he served from 1956 to 1958 in the United States Air Force, and rose to rank of first lieutenant.

Hutchinson's public service career began in 1967, when he became Charleston treasurer, a post he held until 1971. He then served as Mayor of Charleston, the capital of West Virginia, from 1971 until 1980.

When longtime Congressman and fellow Democrat John M. Slack Jr. died in office on March 17, 1980, Hutchinson won the special election for the balance of Slack'a 12th term. His short tenure began on June 30, 1980, and ended on January 3, 1981.

Hutchinson was defeated for his bid for his own full term by Republican nominee Mick Staton. However, Staton himself served only one term before being defeated by Democrat Bob Wise. This brought about a very rare situation in the U.S. House, where three men represented the same district within a three-year period, from 1980 to 1983. This was especially rare for West Virginia, which typically gives its congressmen very long tenures in Washington. In sharp contrast, the last of those men, Wise, went on to serve for nine terms before becoming governor in 2001.

After leaving politics, Hutchinson became a business executive in Charleston. He died in Atlanta on May 31, 2024, at the age of 89.

== See also ==
- List of mayors of Charleston, West Virginia

U.S. House of Representatives
Preceded by John M. Slack Jr.	Member of the U.S. House of Representatives from West Virginia's 3rd congressional district June 30, 1980 – January 3, 1981	Succeeded by Mick Staton
