= Julian P. Kanter Political Commercial Archive =

Coordinates: 35°12′32″N 97°26′55″W

Burton Hall is home to the Julian P. Kanter Political Commercial Archive

The Julian P. Kanter Political Commercial Archive at the University of Oklahoma is a depository for political television and radio commercials. The purpose of the archive is to preserve these materials while making them available for research. The Julian P. Kanter Political Commercial Archive has been designated an official project by Save America's Treasures.

== History ==
In 1950, Julian P. Kanter started work in the television industry. From his time working in television, Kanter observed that most political ads were thrown away after their election cycles had ended because the candidates' campaigns often didn't ask for them back. Thus in 1956, Kanter, believing the ads were of historical importance, created a private archive from the 1952 and 1956 presidential elections. By 1983, the University of Oklahoma's communications department made space for the political communication center in Kaufmen Hall. In 1985, the University of Oklahoma and the Smithsonian Institution competed to purchase Kanter's archive, which at this point contained over 25,000 commercials.

Ultimately, the University of Oklahoma won out with a bid of $250,000 in special appropriations. Though money was part of his decision, other reasons that Kanter cited were that he liked the idea of a multi-disciplinary facility working in political communication. Another reason was that the University of Oklahoma offered to make him curator of the archive and made him an adjunct professor of political communication; contributing to education was something he'd always wanted. Mr. Kanter served as the archive's curator for ten years. Kanter died on December 5, 2011.

== Today ==
As of 2016, the archive holds approximately 160,000 commercials and is the most comprehensive collection of political advertisements in the world. The commercials date back to 1936 for radio and 1950 for television. More than 65% of the archive's total holdings and more than 80% of its film holdings are not found anywhere else. A refrigeration unit, kept at 35 degrees Fahrenheit preserves 5,600 political film ads. The archive contains original masters on many different formats, such as 2-inch videotape, 3/4-inch videotape, audiotape, 1-inch videotape, 16 mm film, and 1/2-inch videocassette. As a result of a grant from Save America's Treasures, the material in the archive has been digitized. A 500-gig hard drive contains ads from two of the presidential campaigns that the archive has had stored. The archive is now part of the Carl Albert Congressional Research and Studies Center's Congressional and Political Collections. The archive is located in Burton Hall on the campus of the University of Oklahoma.
