= Danny Jones (politician) =

American politician

Mayor of Charleston
- In office June 1, 2003 – January 7, 2019
- Preceded by: Jay Goldman
- Succeeded by: Amy Shuler Goodwin

Personal details
- Born: Daniel Boyd Jones; August 16, 1950 (age 75)
- Party: Independent (2016–present); Republican (1971–2016)

Daniel Boyd Jones (born August 16, 1950) is an American businessman and politician. He served four terms as the mayor of Charleston, West Virginia from 2003 to 2019.

Jones grew up in Charleston and served in the U.S. Marine Corps. He had a variety of jobs before becoming an elected official. Jones served a term in the West Virginia House of Delegates and a term as Sheriff of Kanawha County before being elected mayor of Charleston.

== Early life, education, military service, and career ==
Jones grew up in the South Hills neighborhood of Charleston. He attended Greenbrier Military School and graduated from George Washington High School.

Jones served in the U.S. Marine Corps from 1969 to 1971 and was deployed to Vietnam during the Vietnam War. When he was in the Marines he decided to be a truck driver. After returning to the United States, Jones worked in a variety of jobs, including as a bartender, bar owner, bouncer, gravedigger, and radio talk show host on WQBE-FM.

== Political career ==
Jones first registered as a Republican in 1971. Beginning in 1984, he won a string of 12 primary and general elections as a Republican.

=== Sheriff and state delegate ===
Jones was sheriff of Kanawha County, serving one term in office from 1984 to 1988. Jones was the first Republican to be elected as Kanawha County sheriff in more than thirty years; at the time, registered Democratic voters outnumbered registered Republican voters 2–1 in the county. As sheriff, Jones oversaw 130 full- and part-time employees, and managed the county jail, county law enforcement, and the county tax department. Jones cited the reorganization of the tax department as one of his accomplishments as sheriff. He chose not to seek reelection.

Jones was then elected to the West Virginia House of Delegates, serving a single two-year term. He did not seek reelection in 1990 in order to focus on his restaurant business, Danny's Rib House, in Nitro, West Virginia, a "rib shack" operated by Jones for four years.

=== Mayor of Charleston ===
==== Elections ====
Jones first became mayor of Charleston in 2003. In 2007, Jones won a second term in office, receiving 4,304 votes (79%) and defeating Democratic candidate Hershel Layne, who won 1,142 votes (21%). In 2011, Jones won a third term with 3,349 votes (71%), defeating Democratic candidate Janet Thompson, who won 1,376 votes (29%).

In 2015, Jones won a fourth term as mayor of Charleston, becoming the first person to serve four terms in the position. In the 2015 Republican primary, Jones defeated a conservative primary challenger. In the election, Jones received the endorsement of the Charleston Gazette-Mail for reelection. Jones won 3,623 votes, defeating Democratic candidate Paul Monroe (who won 1,984 votes) and independent candidate Bill Carpenter (who won 191 votes).

In 2016, Jones announced that he would not run for reelection as mayor, or for any other elected office, in the next mayoral election in 2018.

==== Tenure and policies ====
Jones has cited, as major accomplishments in office, the Appalachian Power Park, renovations to the Charleston Civic Center, and the a half-cent sales tax to fund the pension debt for Charleston's police and firefighters. Under Jones, the city also constructed new public housing units as replacements for older units. Jones supported the City of Charleston's $2-per-week "user fee" on people employed in the city.

Jones was mayor during the 2014 Elk River chemical spill, which had a major effect on Charleston. Jones has strongly criticized Freedom Industries, the company responsible. Jones said: "I can't believe there is not a law against what they did, ... [The leaders of Freedom Industries are] a bunch of renegades who have done irreparable harm to this valley ... Quite frankly, somebody needs to go to jail." Jones questioned whether the company's executives "cared what happened to the public."

==== Leaving Republican Party ====
In September 2016, Jones left the Republican Party after 45 years, switching his party affiliation to "unaffiliated" and endorsing Libertarian presidential nominee Gary Johnson. Jones said that he could not support Republican presidential nominee Donald Trump and also cited the party's drift to the right. Jones specially cited "the obsession of the West Virginia House of Delegates' leadership with the Religious Freedom Restoration Act."

== Awards and honors ==
In 2018, the West Virginia Municipal League honored Jones with its James C. Hunt Lifetime Achievement Award, the fourth time the award was issued in 26 years.

== See also ==
- List of mayors of Charleston, West Virginia
