= Thais Blatnik =

American journalist and politician

Member of the West Virginia Senate
- In office 1986–1996

Member of the West Virginia House of Delegates
- In office 1980–1986
- In office 1977–1978

Personal details
- Born: Thais F. O'Donnell Shuler; November 20, 1919 Wheeling, West Virginia, U.S.
- Died: December 9, 2015 (aged 96) Wheeling, West Virginia, U.S.
- Party: Democratic
- Spouse: Albert M. Blatnik
- Relations: Amy Shuler Goodwin (granddaughter)
- Education: West Liberty University

Thais F. O'Donnell Shuler Blatnik (November 20, 1919 – December 9, 2015) was an American journalist and politician who served in both chambers of the West Virginia Legislature.

== Early life and education ==
Born in Wheeling, West Virginia, Blatnik grew up in Weirton, West Virginia. She graduated from West Liberty University.

== Career ==
Blatnik worked as a reporter for the Weirton Daily Times, The Wheeling Intelligencer, and as an editor for the Dominion Post. Blatnik served in the West Virginia House of Delegates from 1977 to 1978 and again from 1980 to 1986. She then served in the West Virginia Senate from 1989 to 1996 as a Democrat.

== Personal life ==
Blatnik died in Wheeling, West Virginia. Her granddaughter, Amy Shuler Goodwin, is the mayor of Charleston, West Virginia.
