= George H. Goodrich =

American judge (1925–2015)

- Born: George Herbert Goodrich; June 19, 1925; Charleston, West Virginia, U.S.
- Died: September 22, 2015 (aged 90); Charlottesville, Virginia, U.S.
- Burial place: Monticello Memorial Gardens, Charlottesville, Virginia
- Education: University of Virginia School of Law; Williams College; St. Albans School
- Occupations: judge, attorney
- Employer(s): Superior Court of the District of Columbia; Heffelfinger, Schweitzer and Goodrich

George Herbert Goodrich (June 19, 1925 – September 22, 2015) was an American judge and attorney. He served as a judge with the Superior Court of the District of Columbia for 36 years.

== Early life ==
Goodrich was born in Charleston, West Virginia. His parents were Beulah (née Lenfast) and Edgar Jennings Goodrich, an attorney "regarded as the nation's foremost authority on tax law…." In 1931, his father was appointed judge of the U.S. Board of Tax Appeals, and the family moved to Washington D.C. They spent their summers at their cottage, Sandy Bottoms, at Rehoboth Beach, Delaware.

He attended St. Albans School in Washington, D.C., graduating in 1943. During World War II, he served in the U.S. Navy as a corpsman and operating room technician on the hospital ship, USS Sanctuary (AH-17), in both the Atlantic and Pacific theaters.

After the war, he attended Williams College and received a B.A. in 1949. There, he was a member of the Fraternity of Delta Psi (St. Anthony Hall). He enrolled in the University of Virginia School of Law in the fall of 1949, and graduated in 1952. While there, he was senior editor of the Law Weekly.

Goodrich received a Doctor of Jurisprudence from the University of Virginia School of Law in 1977.

== Career ==
After graduating from law school, Goodrich practiced with Guggenheimer, Untermeyer, Goodrich and Amram—his father's law firm. He then became a partner in Heffelfinger, Schweitzer and Goodrich with Thomas B. Heffelfinger for many years. Their offices were in Washington, D.C.

On August 12, 1969, President Richard Nixon appointed Goodrich to a ten-year term as an associate justice of the District of Columbia Court. He later to become a justice with the Superior Court of the District of Columbia, serving there for 36 years. He worked in all branches of the Superior Court—civil, criminal, and family. He was the administrative head of the family division and his peers elective him a representative to the Joint Committee on Judicial Administration. The Joint Committee decides policy matters for the D.C. Court of Appeals and the Superior Court.

The Commission of Judicial Tenure evaluated his performance as follows:

"Judge Goodrich is known among his colleagues, practicing attorneys, and others familiar with his conduct on the Court as a dedicated and hard-working jurist, who takes his judicial duties most seriously and sincerely, and whose diligence and steady dependability are of the highest order. ...He is possessed of an excellent judicial temperament and does his work calmly, patiently, and sympathetically. He listens attentively to the argument of counsel, and shows a courteous respect and concern for their professional efforts in his Courtroom... His decisions are well written and concise, indicating a comprehensive grasp of the law and an understanding of the pivotal issues of the cases being tried by him. He keeps matters moving forward in his Courtroom, and maintains good control over proceedings coming before him… He has contributed immeasurably to improving the image of the Superior Court and to elevating the quality of judicial performance in the District of Columbia."

On February 25, 1977, Goodrich upheld Washington, D.C.'s gun law that limited the number of guns citizens could own and required annual gun registrations. The law also required handgun owners to unload and disassemble weapons in the house. Another component of the law which made it the strictest in the United States, was that no handguns could be sold or brought into in the District. The case was filed by the National Rifle Association of America (NRA) against the District of Columbia, with the latter being supported by the National Council to Control Handguns. In his finding, Goodrich upheld the city's ordinances as "in the public interest and a valid act."

On February 8, 1983, Goodrich ordered Howard University to temporarily reinstate Janice McKnight, the student editor of The Hilltop newspaper that had covered sex discrimination at the college because the university had failed to follow its policy that gives students a right to a hearing before expulsion. The day before expelling McKnight, the university had dismissed the employee who had filled the sex discrimination complaint. The judge found that it was "a mighty strange coincidence" that McKnight was expelled after ignoring the university president's request to stop newspaper coverage of the topic. The college maintained that McKnight "misrepresented her academic background on her admissions application in 1979." Goodrich noted that, even if true, Howard's position was "inflexible" and also "questioned the propriety of expelling McKnight for the admissions infraction after she had completed three years at the school." In addition to ordering that the university reinstate McKnight as a student and as the editor of The Hilltop, he also ordered Howard University to "cease and desist from interfering with her exercise of free press rights guaranteed by the…United States Constitution."

In 1986, Goodrich was named acting chief judge of the Superior Court, following the death of Judge H. Carl Moultrie. He also was on the faculty of the American Institute of Banking and the American University School of Business Administration. Goodrich retired from the bench in 2005.

== Publications ==
- "Should Expert be Allowed to Testify concerning Eyewitness Testimony in Criminal Cases." Judges Journal, vol. 14 (1975): 70.

== Professional affiliations ==
Early in his career, Goodrich was a member of the District of Columbia Junior Bar Association, serving as chair of its program and activities committee. Later, he was a member and secretary of the D.C. Bar Association. He was also a member of the American Law Institute and the Judicial Conference of the District of Columbia.

== Personal life ==
In 1949, Goodrich married Nancy Ann Needham of Washington, D.C., his high school sweetheart. She was a graduate of Mount Holyoke College and was working for Time magazine in New York City. He father was Delos J. Needham, general counsel of the American Bankers Association.

The couple moved to Jefferson Park Avenue in Charlottesville, Virginia while Goodrich attended law school. Nancy worked for WCHV radio in advertising and broadcast. When he completed law school, they moved to Wood Acres, Maryland. They had three sons: Dr. Rev. George Herbert Goodrich Jr., Rev. Craig Needham Goodrich, and Rev. Thomas Abrams Goodrich.

Goodrich was president of the St. Albans Alumni Association and the Homemakers Service of the National Capital Area. He also served on the board of the American Red Cross D.C. Chapter, the Hillcrest Children's Center, and St. Albans School. He was a member of the Metropolitan Club and the Chevy Chase Club. He was also a member and elder of the National Presbyterian Church.

After retiring, Goodrich and his wife returned to Charlottesville. There, he was a member of Meadows Presbyterian Church where his son Thomas was pastor. They also had a cottage, Windstar, at the Outer Banks in North Carolina.

In 2015, Goodrich died in Charlottesville at the age of ninety years. His memorial service was held at the Meadows Presbyterian Church. He was buried at Monticello Memorial Gardens.
