= Amy Shuler Goodwin =

American politician

Mayor of Charleston
- Incumbent
- Assumed office January 7, 2019
- Preceded by: Danny Jones

Personal details
- Born: Amy Shuler; March 9, 1971 (age 55)
- Party: Democratic
- Spouse: Booth Goodwin (m. 1999)
- Children: 2
- Relatives: Thais Blatnik (grandmother)
- Education: West Virginia University, Morgantown (BS)

Amy Shuler Goodwin (born March 9, 1971) is an American journalist and politician from the state of West Virginia. She is the first female mayor of Charleston, West Virginia, serving since January 2019.

== Early life and career ==
Goodwin is a native of Wheeling, West Virginia. Her father, Floyd Shuler, is a business owner, and her mother, Pat Shuler, is a teacher. Her grandmother, Thais Blatnik, served in the West Virginia Senate.

Goodwin graduated from Wheeling Park High School and earned a bachelor's degree in journalism from West Virginia University in 1994. She worked for ABC News as a researcher, before working as a reporter and anchor for WCHS-TV in Charleston and WTRF-TV in Wheeling.

== Political career ==
Goodwin served as communications director for Kemp Melton, the mayor of Charleston, in the 1990s, and as state communications director for John Kerry's 2004 presidential campaign. She also served as communications director for Governors Bob Wise and Earl Ray Tomblin. In 2014, Tomblin appointed her as commissioner of the West Virginia Division of Tourism and deputy secretary of commerce. She served in the role until January 2017, when Governor Jim Justice selected Chelsea Ruby for the position.

In February 2017, Goodwin declared her intention to run for mayor of Charleston in the 2018 election, seeking to succeed Danny Jones, who opted not to run for reelection. She defeated Republican J. B. Akers and independent Andy Backus in the November 2018 general election, and won with almost 51% of the vote. She was sworn into office on January 7, 2019, becoming the first female mayor of Charleston.

Goodwin was reelected in November 2022 and again in November 2026.

== Personal life ==
Goodwin is married to Booth Goodwin, a former United States Attorney and 2016 Democratic candidate for Governor. They wed on April 17, 1999 and have two sons.

Political offices
Preceded by Danny Jones	Mayor of Charleston; 2019–present	Incumbent
