= Thomas E. Patterson =

American political scientist

- Scientific career
- Fields: Political science
- Institutions: Harvard Kennedy School

Thomas E. Patterson is an American political scientist. He is the Bradlee Professor of Government and the Press Shorenstein Center at Harvard Kennedy School.

== Early life ==
Patterson served in the Vietnam War as a lieutenant in the US Army Special Forces.

== Writings ==
Patterson has authored a number of textbooks and other books:

- Is the Republican Party Destroying Itself? (2020)
- Summary of The Mueller Report, for those too busy to read It all (2019)
- How America Lost Its Mind: The Assault on Reason That's Crippling Our Democracy (2019)
- We The People (2018, 2016) - textbook
- Informing the News (2013)
- The American Democracy (2012)
- Out of Order: An incisive and boldly original critique of the news media's domination of America's political process (2011)
- The Vanishing Voter: Public Involvement in an Age of Uncertainty (2009)
