= John M. Slack Jr. =

American politician (1915–1980)

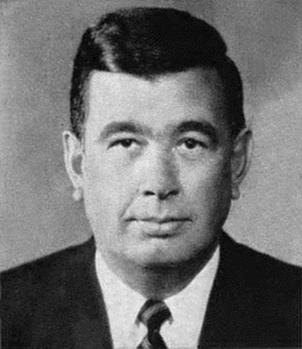

Member of the U.S. House of Representatives from West Virginia
- In office January 3, 1959 – March 17, 1980
- Preceded by: Robert C. Byrd
- Succeeded by: John G. Hutchinson
- Constituency: 6th district (1959-1963); 3rd district (1963-1980)

Personal details
- Born: March 18, 1915 Charleston, West Virginia, U.S.
- Died: March 17, 1980 (aged 64) Alexandria, Virginia, U.S.
- Party: Democratic

John Mark Slack Jr. (March 18, 1915 – March 17, 1980) was an American politician from West Virginia. He was a member of the Democratic Party.

Slack was born in Charleston, where he attended the public schools. He later studied at the Virginia Military Institute in Lexington, Virginia.

Slack's public service career began in 1948, when he became a member of Kanawha County Court, where he sat until 1952. He subsequently served as Kanawha County Assessor from 1952 to 1958.

When three-term 6th district Representative Robert Byrd decided against seeking re-election in order to run for the U.S. Senate, Slack won the Democratic nomination and was easily elected that November. He went on to be re-elected 11 times, never facing serious opposition. His district was renumbered as the 3rd District in 1963, after West Virginia lost a district as a result of the 1960 Census. Slack voted in favor of the Civil Rights Acts of 1960, 1964, and 1968, and the Voting Rights Act of 1965. During his long years in Congress, Slack amassed a mostly liberal voting record.

Slack served until his death of a heart attack in Alexandria, Virginia on March 17, 1980. He was replaced by John G. Hutchinson, then mayor of Charleston, after a special election, who served until the end of the term. He was interred in Cunningham Memorial Park, St. Albans, West Virginia.

== See also ==
- List of members of the United States Congress who died in office (1950–1999)

U.S. House of Representatives
Preceded by Robert Byrd	Member of the U.S. House of Representatives from West Virginia's 6th congressional district 1959–1963	District eliminated
Preceded by Cleveland M. Bailey	Member of the U.S. House of Representatives from West Virginia's 3rd congressional district 1963–1980	Succeeded by John G. Hutchinson
