= Joe F. Smith =

American politician (1918–2013)

Member of the West Virginia House of Delegates
- In office 1997–2002
- In office 1993–1994

Personal details
- Born: December 25, 1918 Bristol, Virginia, U.S.
- Died: August 2, 2013 (aged 94) Charleston, West Virginia, U.S.
- Party: Democratic
- Education: Virginia Polytechnic Institute
- Occupation: Politician

Military service
- Allegiance: United States
- Branch/service: United States Army
- Battles/wars: World War II

Joe F. Smith (December 25, 1918 – August 2, 2013) was an American politician.

Born in Bristol, Virginia, he served in the United States Army during World War II. He graduated from Virginia Polytechnic Institute in 1941. After World War II, he worked for C&P Telephone and moved to Charleston, West Virginia. In 1967, he served on the Charleston City Council and then in 1975, Smith was elected city treasurer. In 1980 he was selected mayor of Charleston serving until 1983. In 1985, Governor Jay Rockefeller appointed Smith executive secretary of the West Virginia Public Employees System. He then served in the West Virginia House of Delegates from 1993-1994 and 1997-2002 as a Democrat. He died in Charleston, West Virginia.

== See also ==
- List of mayors of Charleston, West Virginia
