= Congressional archives =

Records documenting the history and activities of the United States Congress

Congressional archives consist of records and personal papers that document the history and activities of the United States Congress. The National Archives and Records Administration’s Center for Legislative Archives collects and preserves the official administrative and legislative records of the U.S. Senate and the U.S. House of Representatives. The personal papers of individual senators and representatives, broadly called congressional collections, are the private property of members of Congress. Many members choose to donate their papers to repositories where their records are preserved and made available to the public.

== Overview ==
The information resources documenting the legislative branch of the United States government are important for the understanding the role Congress plays in making the Nation’s laws and representing the views of the people in the federal government. The records and personal papers are created in many formats, including paper documents and photographs, electronic files, e-mails, databases, social media posts, videos, and more. Permanent records of the House of Representatives and the Senate reside in the National Archives and Records Administration’s Center for Legislative Archives. The personal papers of members of both chambers are preserved at archival repositories throughout the United States.

== Official Records of the U.S. Congress ==
The official records of Congress are created in the standing, select, and joint committees of the Senate and House of Representatives. These records document committees’ organization, functions, and legislative intent and history. Records include bill and hearing files, meeting minutes, correspondence with executive agencies and interested parties, staff research files, and more. The National Archives and Records Administration’s Center for Legislative Archives maintains physical custody of the records and makes them available to the public in accordance with House and Senate rules.

In the House, the chair of each committee transfers non-current records of the committee to the Clerk. The Clerk delivers the records to the Archivist of the United States for preservation in the National Archives and Records Administration. These records remain the permanent property of the House and are subject to rules and orders of the body. Most records are closed from public viewing for 30–50 years depending on their nature and content.

In the Senate, official records filed with the Secretary of the Senate are transferred to the National Archives. The Senate continues to own their records and determine the rules of access. Senate records are closed for 20 years, and records with personal information or relating to investigations, executive sessions, or nominations, are closed for 50 years.

== Personal Papers of Members of the U.S. Congress ==
Any files created by a congressional office are considered the Member’s property. These typically include legislative files, constituent services files, political campaign and leadership files, personal papers, and office management files. Members’ personal papers may be donated to an archival repository of their designation and are dispersed in repositories throughout the country.

== History ==
Prior to the 1930s, no centralized means of archiving the records of Congress existed. Then in 1937 the Senate began to transfer records to the National Archives and Records Administration. The House of Representatives began to do the same in 1946.

In 1977, the congressionally mandated National Study Commission on Records and Documents of Federal Officials, known as the Public Documents Commission, recommended that presidential and congressional papers should be defined as public property. Congress passed the 1978 Presidential Records Act to make the presidential records public property, but the ownership of congressional records was more complex. The Senate took steps to better manage its official records first by creating the Senate Historical Office in 1975 and then with a 1980 mandate that most of its confidential records be opened 20 years after their creation. The records created in Member offices remained the private property of each member. There have been thousands of Members of Congress and preservation of the significant volume of congressional archival materials remains a challenge. In 1985, the National Archives established the Legislative Archives Division, renamed the Center for Legislative Archives in 1988.

Steps to improve congressional records management and preservation continued, and in 1990, the Advisory Committee on the Records of Congress was created to advise Congress and the Archivist of the United States on the preservation of the records of Congress. The committee is chaired by the Clerk of the House and the Secretary of the Senate and includes the Senate and House historians, the Archivist of the United States, and appointed public members who represent historians, political scientists, congressional archivists, and others responsible for legislative records. It meets twice a year.

In 1992, The Documentation of Congress was published based on the work of the Task Force on Congressional Documentation of the Society of American Archivists’ Congressional Archivists Roundtable. The Documentation of Congress provided detailed recommendations for improving the documentation of congressional functions.

In 2008, the House of Representatives passed House Concurrent Resolution 307, declaring that papers of Members are “crucial to the public’s understanding of the role of Congress in making the Nation’s laws and responding to the needs of its citizens.”

== Repositories for Personal Papers of Members of the U.S. Congress ==
Names of repositories that hold congressional papers are available through the National Archives and Records Administration’s Center for Legislative Archives and the Biographical Directory of the U.S. Congress.

== Lists of Personal Papers of Members of Congress by State ==
- List of locations of West Virginia Congressional papers
- List of locations of Ohio congressional papers
