= List of people from Luzerne County, Pennsylvania =

Location of Luzerne County in Pennsylvania

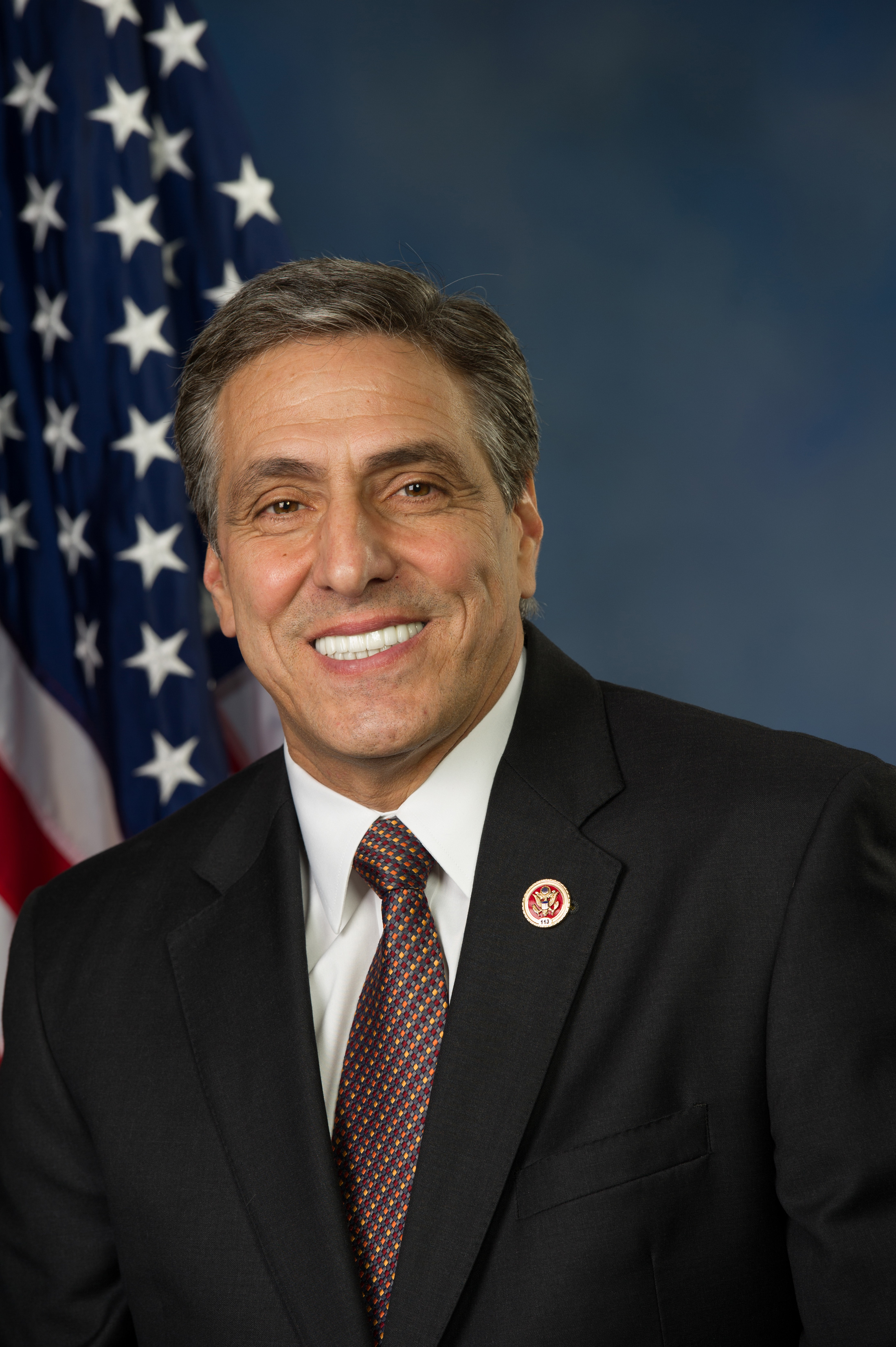
Lou Barletta, a former member of the U.S. House of Representatives from Pennsylvania's 11th district (2011–2019)

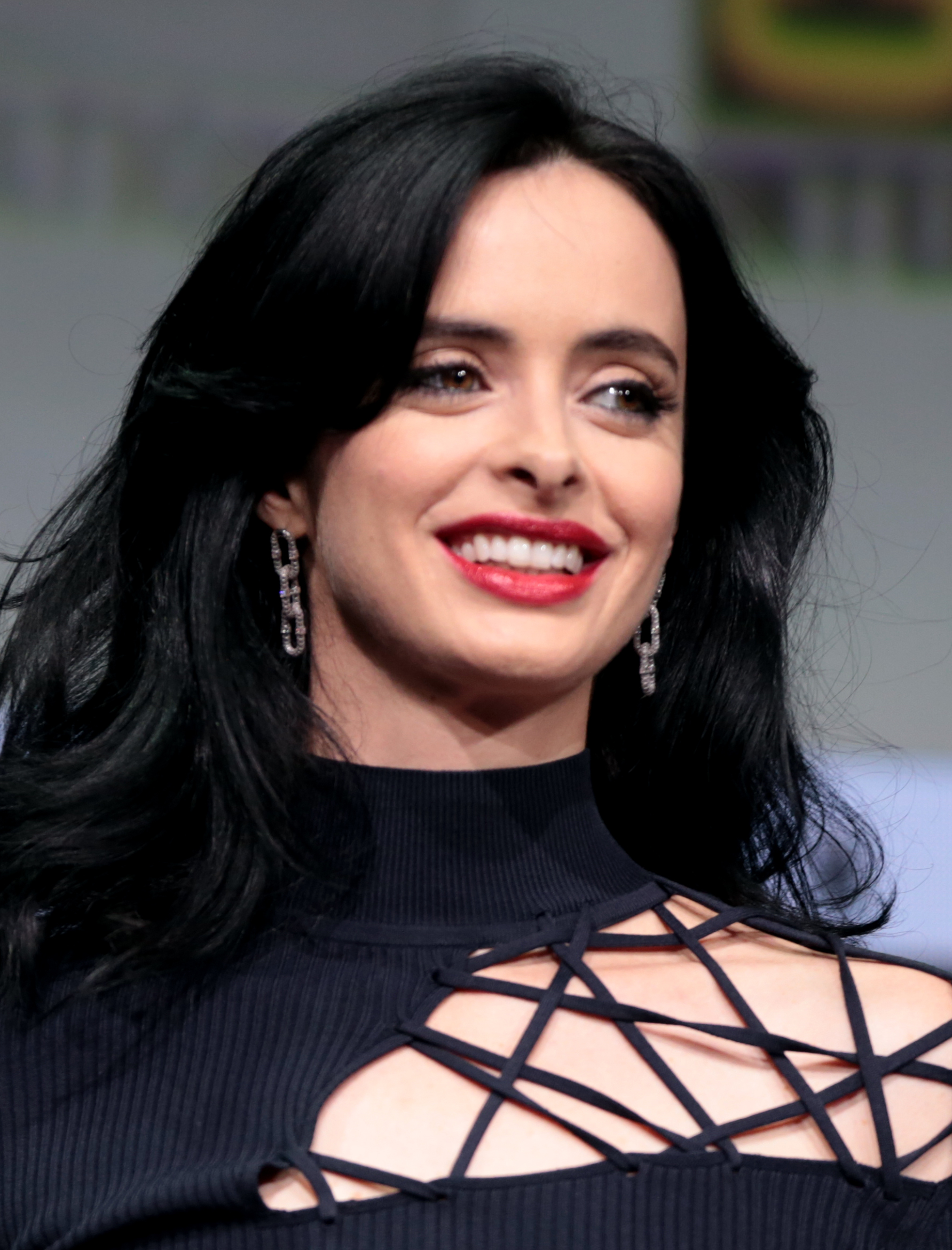
Krysten Ritter, actress and former model

The following is a list of notable people from Luzerne County, Pennsylvania.

== Arts, Fashion, & Entertainment ==
- Edie Adams, singer, actress, and comedian; wife of Ernie Kovacs
- Nick Adams, actor (Mister Roberts, Rebel Without a Cause), best known to audiences as Johnny Yuma of the TV series The Rebel
- Banana Joe (Joseph Montione), radio personality
- Douglas Carter Beane, playwright
- Frank Borzage, Academy Award-winning film director
- Benjamin Burnley, lead singer and guitarist for rock band Breaking Benjamin
- George Catlin, artist
- Catherine Chandler, poet
- Mark Cohen, street photographer
- Flick Colby, choreographer
- Colleen Corby, 1960s fashion model
- David Evans, Hollywood filmmaker most known for the movie The Sandlot
- Pat Finn, game show host whose shows include Lifetime's, The Family Channel's, and PAX's Shop 'til You Drop
- Ham Fisher, cartoonist best known for the Joe Palooka comic strip
- Harry Livingston French, architect
- Tess Gardella, actress
- Dan Harris, Hollywood director and screenwriter
- Donora Hillard, author
- Raye Hollitt, bodybuilder, American Gladiators; actress, Skin Deep
- Florence Foster Jenkins, unconventional operatic soprano, subject of film starring Meryl Streep
- Russell Johnson, actor best known as The Professor on Gilligan's Island
- Candy Jones, fashion model, writer, radio personality
- James Karen, actor
- Mary Holland Kinkaid, novelist and journalist
- Franz Kline, abstract expressionist painter
- Shawn Klush, Elvis tribute artist
- Harley Jane Kozak, actress and author
- Matthew Lesko, infomercial personality
- Sherrie Levine, photographer and appropriation artist
- Jan Lewan, Polish-American songwriter and polka band leader, portrayed by actor Jack Black in the comedy film The Polka King
- Santo Loquasto, Tony Award-winning Broadway production designer
- Marion Lorne, actress best known as Aunt Clara on the sitcom Bewitched
- Don Malkames, cinematographer
- Herman Mankiewicz, screenwriter of Citizen Kane
- Joseph L. Mankiewicz, Academy Award-winning director and producer
- Al Markim, actor (Tom Corbett, Space Cadet)
- Jay McCarroll, fashion designer
- Mary McDonnell, actress, twice nominated for Academy Award
- Tom McHale, Novelist
- Edward Meneeley, painter
- Albert Mudrian, author and magazine editor
- Claudette Nevins, actress
- Rose O'Neill, cartoonist, illustrator, artist, and writer.
- Jerry Orbach, Tony Award-winning actor
- Jack Palance (Hazle Township), Oscar-winning actor
- Anthony Petrosky, poet
- Suzie Plakson, actress
- Eddie Rambeau, singer, songwriter, and actor.
- Krysten Ritter, actress
- Anne Sargent, actress
- Sam Savitt, equestrian artist, author
- Michael Schoeffling, actor, played Jake Ryan in film Sixteen Candles
- Jonathan Slavin, character actor
- Jason Spisak, voice actor
- Jacob Sullum, journalist and author, featured in Academy Award-nominated documentary Super Size Me
- Louis Teicher, pianist; member of the duo Ferrante & Teicher
- Dan Terry, trumpet player and big band leader
- Michael Whalen, actor
- Stacey Williams, fashion model
- June Winters, actress and singer

== Sports ==
- Joe Amato, 5-time NHRA Top Fuel champion
- Al Bedner, NFL player
- Martin Bibla, NFL player
- Steve Bilko, 20 years old when he broke into professional baseball on September 22, 1949, with the St. Louis Cardinals
- Ray Black, Pitcher for the Milwaukee Brewers
- Hubie Brown, basketball coach and television analyst
- Lou Butera, professional pool player
- Russ Canzler, Major League Baseball player in the New York Yankees minor league organization
- Jimmy Cefalo, Penn State football player, Miami Dolphins wide receiver, radio voice of the Miami Dolphins
- Britton Chance, bio-physicist and Olympic sailor
- Abe Cohen, professional football player
- Ed Cole, Major League Baseball pitcher
- Adam Comorosky, MLB outfielder
- Michael Costello, racing driver
- Red Davis, Third baseman for The New York Giants (baseball) 1941
- Dominic DeLuca, Penn State Linebacker signed as an undrafted free agent by the Baltimore Ravens
- Harry Dorish, MLB pitcher
- Mark Duda, NFL player, Lackawanna College football head coach
- Francis A. "Mother" Dunn, football player for the Canton Bulldogs
- Carl Duser, baseball player
- Pete Elko, Major League Baseball third baseman
- Steamer Flanagan, professional baseball player
- Billy Goeckel, baseball player
- Pete Gray, one of two men ever to play major league baseball having lost his right arm; his life is depicted in the 1986 television movie A Winner Never Quits; historical marker in the Hanover section of Nanticoke at Front and Center St. denotes his birthplace
- Kevin Gryboski, Retired Major League Baseball pitcher
- Harry Hamilton, former NFL player
- William Harmatz, jockey, winner of 1959 Preakness Stakes
- Bucky Harris, former Major League Baseball player
- Mickey Haslin, Major League Baseball infielder
- Joe Hergert, former professional football player
- Jim Hettes, UFC fighter
- Joe Holup, former NBA basketball player
- Mike Hudock, professional football player
- Qadry Ismail, former NFL wide receiver on the Baltimore Ravens
- Raghib Ismail, former NFL player and Heisman Trophy runner-up
- Stephanie Jallen, Paralympic skier
- Hughie Jennings, Major League Baseball player and manager
- Ben Johnson, track athlete and one of the first African-American colonels in the U.S. Army
- Joe Katchik, professional football player
- Kelsey Kolojejchick, field hockey player for the US Olympic Team
- Mike Konnick, former MLB player
- Al Klawitter, Major League Baseball pitcher
- Norm Larker (Beaver Meadows), National League All-Star player for the LA Dodgers
- Bob MacKinnon Jr., basketball coach
- Joe Maddon, current manager of Major League Baseball's Los Angeles Angels and former manager of the Tampa Bay Rays and Chicago Cubs
- Diane Madl, Olympic field hockey player
- Greg Manusky, former NFL player
- Tom Matchick, MLB player for the Detroit Tigers, Boston Red Sox, Kansas City Royals, Milwaukee Brewers, Baltimore Orioles
- Connor McGovern, NFL offensive lineman
- Tommy McMillan, Major League Baseball outfielder and shortstop
- John Mellus, former NFL player
- David Micahnik (born 1938), Olympic fencer
- Lou Michaels, former NFL player
- Walt Michaels, former head coach of the NFL's New York Jets
- Joe Murray, left-handed pitcher for the Philadelphia A's
- Kid O'Hara, baseball player
- Phil Ostrowski, NFL player
- Joe Palooka, Comic strip boxer created by Ham Fisher
- John Paluck, football player for Washington Redskins and Pro Bowl selection
- Simon F. Pauxtis, professional baseball player and college football coach
- Bob Patton, former NFL pLayer
- Joe Pisarcik, former NFL quarterback
- Dave Popson, former NBA basketball player
- Packy Rogers, infielder with the Brooklyn Dodgers
- Mendy Rudolph, NBA referee 1953–1975
- Don Schwall, MLB pitcher
- Paige Selenski, field hockey player for the U.S. Olympic team
- Chuck Sieminski, former NFL player
- Greg Skrepenak, former NFL player
- Ron Solt, former NFL player
- Bob Sura, basketball player, Houston Rockets
- Mike Tresh, MLB catcher
- Charley Trippi, University of Georgia football player, 1943 Rose Bowl MVP, College Football Hall of Fame inductee, Chicago Cardinals quarterback and Pro Football Hall of Fame inductee; namesake of football stadium at Pittston Area High School in Yatesville
- Bob Tucker, NFL tight end with the New York Giants
- Ty Tyson, MLB outfielder
- Ed Walsh, Hall of Fame pitcher; major league baseball's all-time ERA leader
- John Walsh, MLB third baseman
- Hal Woodeshick, professional baseball player
- Tom Woodeshick, professional football player
- Matt Wotherspoon, Major League Baseball player
- Frank Zane, bodybuilder, three-time Mr. Olympia, won Mr. America, Mr. Universe, Mr. World; donated gym at Wilkes University

== Politics, Law, & Military ==
- Jane Alexander, lawyer and Pennsylvania state representative
- Lisa Baker, State Senator from Pennsylvania
- Lou Barletta, congressman representing the 11th District of Pennsylvania
- Edward Bonin, former mayor of Hazleton and former U.S. congressman
- Fletcher C. Booker Jr., U.S. Army major general
- Charles Calvin Bowman, mayor of Pittston and U.S. representative from Pennsylvania
- Rob Bresnahan, U.S. Congressman
- Amasa Dana, former U.S. congressman
- John Dapcevich, former mayor of Juneau, Alaska
- Stanley Woodward Davenport, U.S. congressman (Democrat), 1899–1901
- Charles B. Dougherty, Army National Guard major general who commanded the 28th Infantry Division
- Todd A. Eachus, former state representative of the 116th District and House majority leader of Pennsylvania
- Benjamin F. Evans Jr. (1912–1991), U.S. Army major general, U.S. military's chief of joint U.S. military aid mission in Turkey
- Joseph James Farnan, Jr., United States federal judge
- John S. Fine, 35th governor of Pennsylvania 1951–1955
- J. Harold Flannery, U.S. representative from Pennsylvania
- Dan Flood, former U.S. congressman
- Bob Good, U.S. congressman
- James L. Hallock, Wisconsin state legislator
- Frank G. Harrison, former United States Congressman
- Laning Harvey, Pennsylvania state senator
- William Henry Hines, U.S. Representative for Pennsylvania's 12th congressional district from 1893 to 1895
- Henry M. Hoyt, early governor of Pennsylvania
- Arthur Horace James, Superior Court judge; governor and lieutenant governor of Pennsylvania
- Mitchell Jenkins, former Republican U.S. congressman from Pennsylvania; lived in Shavertown toward the end of his life
- Dorothy Andrews Elston Kabis, treasurer of the United States
- Paul E. Kanjorski, former U.S. representative for Pennsylvania's 11th congressional district (which includes Nanticoke)
- Michael J. Kirwan, represented Youngstown, Ohio in Congress, 1938–1970
- Thomas R. Kline, lawyer
- Thomas M. Leighton, former Wilkes-Barre mayor
- Charles Lemmond, former state senator
- H. Craig Lewis, former state senator
- Dan Meuser, U.S. congressman
- Asher Miner, U.S. Army brigadier general and prominent businessman
- Leo C. Mundy, Pennsylvania state senator and physician
- Patrick J. Murphy, Under Secretary of the Army and Chief Management Officer (CMO); former United States Congressman
- Ray Musto, U.S. representative from Pennsylvania
- James L. Nelligan, former United States Congressman
- Paul F. Nichols, former member of the Virginia House of Delegates
- Joseph F. Perugino, US Army major general
- Maryanne Petrilla, served on the Luzerne County Board of Commissioners; second female commissioner chairperson in the county's history
- M. Gerald Schwartzbach, California criminal defense attorney
- Fred Shupnik, former member of the Pennsylvania House of Representatives
- Harold Raynsford Stark, Chief of Naval Operations 1939–1942
- Thomas Tigue, Pennsylvania state legislator
- Stephen Urban, served on the Luzerne County Board of Commissioners and the Luzerne County Council
- G. Harold Wagner, Pennsylvania state treasurer and Pennsylvania state auditor general
- Frank Comerford Walker, lawyer and politician
- Faustin E. Wirkus, U.S. Marine allegedly crowned as king of La Gonâve, a Haitian island west of Hispaniola
- Ira W. Wood, represented New Jersey's 4th congressional district 1904–1913
- T. Newell Wood, Pennsylvania State Senator
- Hendrick Bradley Wright, lawyer and politician

== Business & Industry ==
- James Joseph Brown, mining innovator
- Lillian Cahn, co-founder of Coach, Inc. and Coach handbag designer
- Jesse Fell, early experimenter with anthracite coal
- George Washington Helme, businessman and founder of Helmetta, New Jersey
- John D. MacArthur, businessman and philanthropist
- William G. McGowan, former MCI communications chairman; responsible for breaking up the Bell Telephone monopoly
- Carl Ferris Miller, banker and arborist
- Mr. Peanut
- Amedeo Obici, founder of Planters Peanuts

== Science, Medicine, & Academia ==
- Hazel Barnes, philosopher
- David Bohm, quantum physicist
- Stanley Dudrick, surgeon who developed TPN
- Edward B. Lewis, winner of the 1995 Nobel Prize in physiology and medicine
- Garrick Mallery, ethnologist
- James A. Martin, prominent Jesuit priest and college professor
- Francis T. McAndrew, social psychologist, professor, science writer
- Jozef Murgas, radio pioneer
- Edward Novitski, geneticist
- Thomas J. O'Hara, provincial of the U.S. Province of Priests and Brothers of the Congregation of Holy Cross; former president of King's College, Pennsylvania
- Austin O'Malley, ophthalmologist, professor & author
- Jay Parini, professor and author
- William Daniel Phillips, co-recipient of the 1997 Nobel Prize in Physics
- John Quackenbush, genome scientist
- Helen L. Webster (1853–1928), philologist and educator

== Notorious Criminal Figures ==
- George Emil Banks, spree killer
- Russell Bufalino (1903–1994), organized crime leader in Pennsylvania, New York, and the American Cosa Nostra; portrayed by actor Joe Pesci in Martin Scorsese's 2019 film The Irishman
- Mark Ciavarella, disgraced judge in kids for cash scandal
- William D'Elia, mobster
- Greg Skrepenak, former NFL player, served on the Luzerne County Board of Commissioners, convicted felon
- Randy Stair, Eaton Township Weis Market shooter
- John Thomas Sweeney, murderer of Dominique Dunne, born and raised in Hazleton
- Albert Tannenbaum, member of Murder, Inc., born in Nanticoke

== Others ==
- Mary Helen Peck Crane (1827–1891), activist, writer; mother of Stephen Crane
- Mary Lucy Dosh (1839–1861), member of the Sisters of Nazareth and volunteer nurse in the American Civil War
- Mary Jo Kopechne, passenger killed in car driven by Ted Kennedy at Chappaquiddick
- Sarah Knauss, lived to age 119
- Edward Peter McManaman, Roman Catholic bishop
- Judith Nathan, wife of former New York City Mayor Rudolph Giuliani
- Andrew Soltis, chess Grandmaster
- Alexis Toth (St. Alexis of Wilkes-Barre), saint in the Eastern Orthodox Church
