= Michael B. Carroll =

American politician

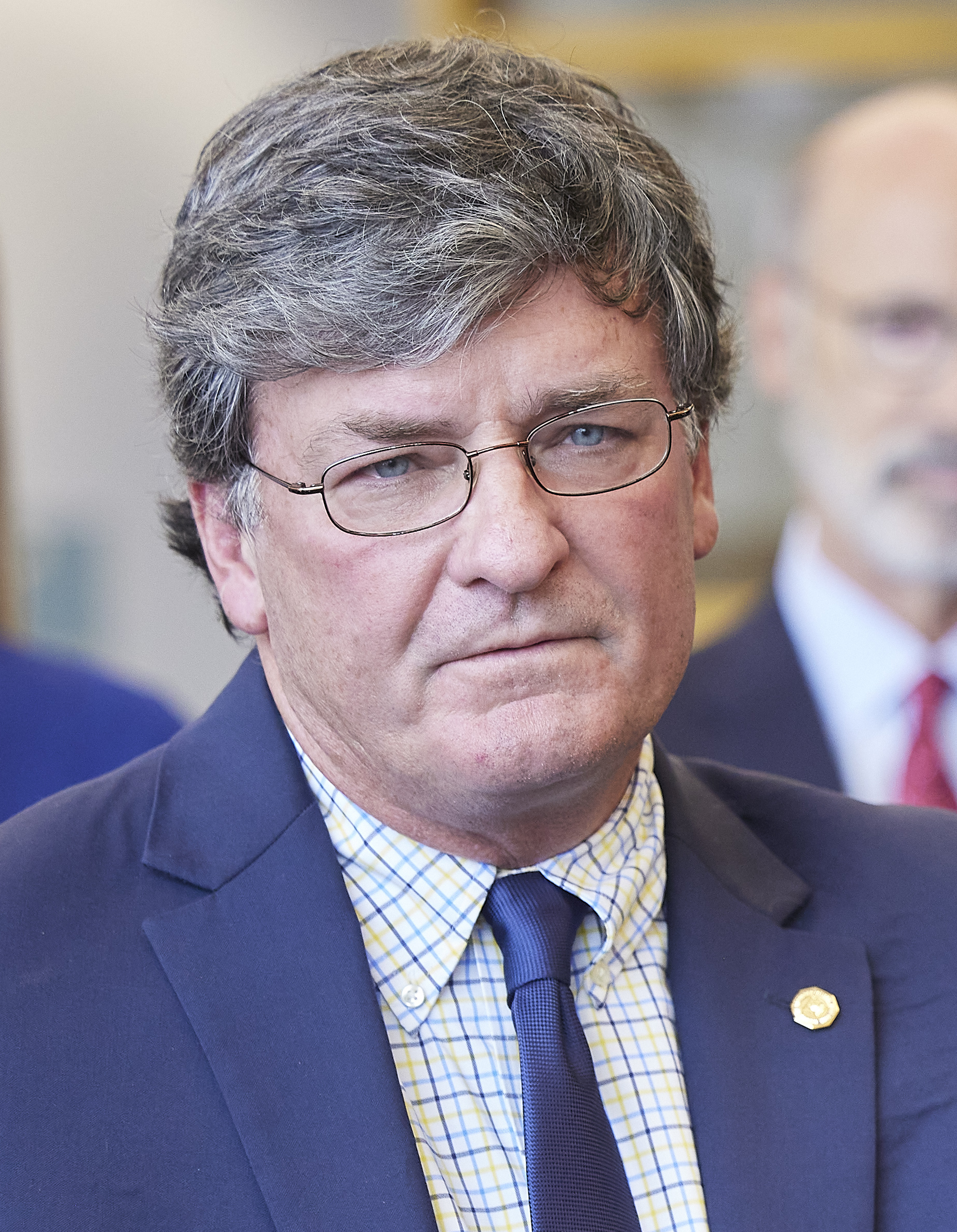
- Carroll in August 2022

Pennsylvania Secretary of Transportation
- Incumbent
- Assumed office January 12, 2023
- Governor: Josh Shapiro
- Preceded by: Yassmin Gramian

Member of the Pennsylvania House of Representatives from the 118th district
- In office January 2, 2007 – November 30, 2022
- Preceded by: Thomas M. Tigue
- Succeeded by: Jim Haddock

Personal details
- Born: 1962 (age 62–63); Avoca, Pennsylvania, U.S.
- Political party: Democratic
- Education: University of Scranton (BA)

Michael B. Carroll (born 1962) is an American politician who serves as the Pennsylvania secretary of transportation since 2023. A Democrat, he previously served as a member of the Pennsylvania House of Representatives for the 118th District from 2007 to 2023.

== Early life and education ==
Carroll was born in Avoca, Pennsylvania. He graduated from Pittston Area High School in 1980 and received a Bachelor of Arts in liberal studies from the University of Scranton.

== Career ==
Prior to elective office, he worked as district office director for Congressman Paul Kanjorski, as liaison for transportation issues for Governor Bob Casey, and as chief of staff for Representative John Yudichak. He was elected to the Pennsylvania House of Representatives in November 2006 and assumed office on January 2, 2007. He did not seek re-election in 2022.

On January 12, 2023, Governor-elect Josh Shapiro nominated Carroll to serve as Pennsylvania Secretary of Transportation. He was confirmed by the Pennsylvania State Senate on May 3. In June 2023, Carroll "practically lived out of a trailer on the site" to supervise the repair of Interstate 95 after its 2023 collapse, resuming traffic in just twelve days.
