= Pennsylvania House of Representatives, District 118 =

American legislative district

Pennsylvania's 118th State House of Representatives district
Representative
Jim Haddock; D–Pittston Township
- Population (2022): 61,770

The 118th Pennsylvania House of Representatives District is located in northeastern Pennsylvania. The district has been represented by Democrat Jim Haddock since 2023.

== District profile ==
The 118th District is located in Lackawanna and Luzerne Counties, including the following areas:

Lackawanna County (part)

- Dalton
- Glenburn Township
- La Plume Township
- Moosic
- Newton Township
- Old Forge
- Ransom Township
- Taylor
- West Abington Township

Luzerne County (part)

- Avoca
- Dupont
- Duryea
- Hughestown
- Jenkins Township
- Laflin
- Pittston
- Pittston Township
- West Pittston
- Yatesville

== Representatives ==
Representative	Party	Years	District home	Note
Prior to 1969, seats were apportioned by county.
James Musto	Democrat	1969 – 1971		Died on May 1, 1971
Raphael J. Musto	Democrat	1971 – 1980		Elected to fill vacancy Resigned on April 15, 1980, after election to U.S. House of Representatives
Thomas M. Tigue	Democrat	1981 – 2006		
Michael B. Carroll	Democrat	2007 – 2022	Avoca	Did not seek re-election
Jim Haddock	Democrat	2023 – present	Pittston Township	Incumbent

== Recent election results ==
PA House election, 2022: Pennsylvania House, District 118
Party	Candidate	Votes	%
Democratic	Jim Haddock	14,611	52.33
Republican	James May	13,310	47.67
Total votes		27,921	100.00
Democratic hold			

PA House election, 2020: Pennsylvania House, District 118
Party	Candidate	Votes	%
Democratic	Michael B. Carroll (incumbent)	18,759	53.53
Republican	Andrew Holter	16,283	46.47
Total votes		35,042	100.00
Democratic hold			

PA House election, 2018: Pennsylvania House, District 118
Party	Candidate	Votes	%
Democratic	Michael B. Carroll (incumbent)	Unopposed	
Total votes		15,936	100.00
Democratic hold			

PA House election, 2016: Pennsylvania House, District 118
Party	Candidate	Votes	%
Democratic	Michael B. Carroll (incumbent)	Unopposed	
Total votes		20,627	100.00
Democratic hold			

PA House election, 2014: Pennsylvania House, District 118
Party	Candidate	Votes	%
Democratic	Michael B. Carroll (incumbent)	Unopposed	
Total votes		12,209	100.00
Democratic hold			

PA House election, 2012: Pennsylvania House, District 118
Party	Candidate	Votes	%
Democratic	Michael B. Carroll (incumbent)	16,879	65.28
Republican	Terrence O'Connor	8,977	34.72
Total votes		25,856	100.00
Democratic hold			

PA House election, 2010: Pennsylvania House, District 118
Party	Candidate	Votes	%
Democratic	Michael B. Carroll (incumbent)	10,775	59.01
Republican	Terrence O'Connor	7,484	40.99
Total votes		18,259	100.00
Democratic hold			
