= Sisters of Nazareth convent, Shefa-Amr =

Coordinates: 32.804261°N 35.172021°E

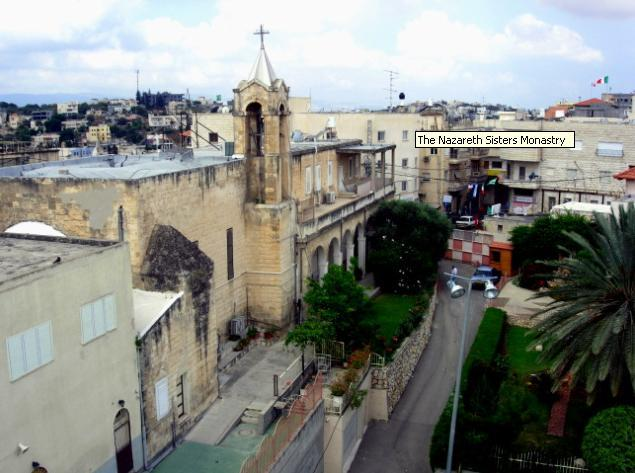
Sisters of Nazareth Convent - Shefa-Amr

The Sisters of Nazareth convent (Arabic: دير راهبات الناصره - شفاعمرو) is a monastery located in the city of Shefa-ʻAmr in the Galilee, Israel. It is a convent created by the homonymous Sisters of Nazareth Convent from Nazareth, both being part of the Paris-based order of the Religieuses de Nazareth, which has no connection to the London-based international Congregation of the Sisters of Nazareth.

== History ==
In the year 1857, after the citizens of Shefa-ʻAmr saw how much the Sisters of Nazareth convent in Nazareth, established in 1855, had helped the people of that city, they contacted the convent's Sister Hilo with an offer to contribute a piece of land in the center of Shefa-ʻAmr containing the ruins of a 4th-century church for a new convent to be built. Sister Hilo accepted the offer, and the convent was built. In 1860 a new school was built in the convent's area; it expanded over the years, and nowadays teaches 1,000 of the city's children.

In those days the area lacked any healthcare systems, so the sisters built a small infirmary and provided healthcare to people of all religions. In 1914 the European sisters had to return to their home lands. Some of the people of Shefa-ʻAmr asked for the infirmary to remain open; the head sister did not have the power to do so, and instead asked the sisters to evacuate the convent to let another monastery occupy it and run the infirmary. The sisters had ordered 30 camels from Haifa to move their baggage. When the camels arrived the men of the city asked them why they had come, and ordered them to go back, then told the sisters "We don't want an infirmary, we don't want another convent we just want the Sisters of Nazareth to stay", so they stayed there for the next 8 days making sure no one left.

In modern days three Sisters lived in the convent, sister Liya Aboud from Shefa-ʻAmr, sister Donsian Nasrawy from Nazareth and sister Muna Ghanem from Lebanon.

== Institutes of the convent ==
- Sons of Mariam institute - a local Christian religious institute with the goal of teaching people about Jesus Christ and Christianity, it also makes trips in the footsteps of Jesus.
- Sawa institute - that arranges cultural and theatrical nights, a dancing school, a painting school, sports festivals and art galleries.
- Al Ba'ath Choir - established in 1986 that performs tens of concerts all over the country and participates in many international art concerts.
