= Paul Kanjorski =

American politician (born 1937)

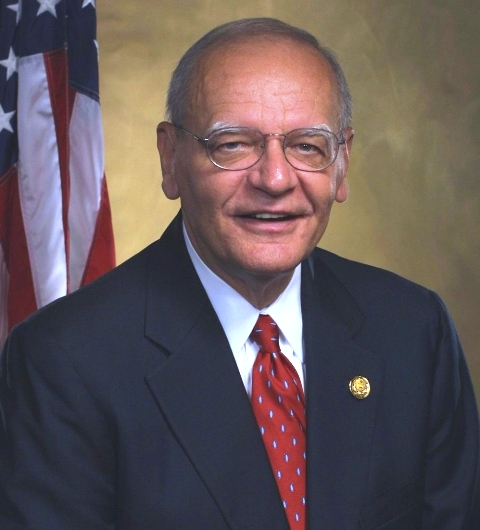

Member of the U.S. House of Representatives from Pennsylvania's 11th district
- In office January 3, 1985 – January 3, 2011
- Preceded by: Frank Harrison
- Succeeded by: Lou Barletta

Personal details
- Born: Paul Edmund Kanjorski; April 2, 1937 (age 89) Nanticoke, Pennsylvania, U.S.
- Party: Democratic
- Spouse: Nancy Kanjorski
- Children: 1
- Education: Temple University (BA); Dickinson School of Law (JD)

Military service
- Branch: United States Army
- Service years: 1960–1961
- Rank: Private
- Unit: United States Army Reserve
- Kanjorski's voice Kanjorski honoring retiring U.S. Rep. Bill Goodling. Recorded October 3, 2000

Paul Edmund Kanjorski (born April 2, 1937) is an American former administrative law judge, lawyer, and politician who served as the U.S. representative for Pennsylvania's 11th congressional district from 1985 until 2011. He is a member of the Democratic Party. The district included the cities of Scranton, Wilkes-Barre, and Hazleton, as well as most of the Poconos.

Before his election to Congress, Kanjorski was a trial attorney, city solicitor, and administrative law judge for workers' compensation. He also served in the United States Army Reserves.

== Early life, education and career ==
Kanjorski was born in Nanticoke, near Wilkes-Barre. He is Polish-American. He attended public schools before enrolling at Wyoming Seminary, a private college preparatory school in Kingston. He finished his high school education at the Capitol Page School in Washington, D.C. He became a congressional page at age 15, first appointed by Republicans but ending up working on the Democratic side of the House. He witnessed the 1954 U.S. Capitol shooting incident, helping to bring stretchers into the chamber for the wounded.

Kanjorski attended Temple University in Philadelphia from 1957 to 1961, and briefly served in the United States Army Reserves from 1960 to 1961. He then attended Dickinson School of Law in Carlisle. He passed the Pennsylvania bar exam in 1966. Kanjorski completed his studies despite having dyslexia, once saying, "I always thought it was a blessing. It forced me to develop my memory."

Before entering politics, Kanjorski practiced law in Wilkes-Barre often helping coal miners and their widows obtain black lung benefits. Kanjorski also volunteered to advocate on behalf of victims of Hurricane Agnes which devastated the Wyoming valley in 1972. Kanjorski served as a worker's compensation administrative law judge for the Commonwealth of Pennsylvania, Assistant Solicitor for the City of Nanticoke and served as assistant solicitor to several other communities.

== U.S. House of Representatives ==
=== Committee assignments ===
- Committee on Financial Services
  - Subcommittee on Capital Markets, Insurance, and Government-Sponsored Enterprises (chairman)
  - Subcommittee on Financial Institutions and Consumer Credit
  - Subcommittee on Housing and Community Opportunity
- Committee on Oversight and Government Reform
  - Subcommittee on Government Management, Organization, and Procurement
  - Subcommittee on Information Policy, Census, and National Archives

=== Earmark controversy ===
Kanjorski encountered controversy over earmarks that he secured for water jet cutter research towards Cornerstone Technologies, a company founded by his nephew and staffed by Kanjorski's daughter and four other nephews. In 2004, former company president Bruce Conrad sued Cornerstone, alleging that Kanjorski and relatives schemed to take over Conrad's stake in the company.

In 2007, Politico revealed that the United States Navy wanted back a high-pressure pump that had been purchased by Cornerstone using taxpayer funds, but Cornerstone could not locate it. Later, the Navy concluded that Cornerstone did not produce anything valuable towards national defense.

== Political positions ==
Like many Pennsylvania Democrats from outside Philadelphia and Pittsburgh, Kanjorski opposed gun control. He is also moderately conservative on abortion. However, he is strongly pro-labor, and has spoken out against the Iraq War. He has served on the Financial Services Committee since he entered Congress in 1985 and was the second-ranking Democrat on that committee at the time of his departure. He usually played behind-the-scenes roles in the advocacy or defeat of legislation and steers appropriations money toward improving the infrastructure and economic needs of his district. He is popularly known as "Kanjo."

On May 10, 2007, the usually moderate Kanjorski voted with fellow Democrats to begin the redeployment of all forces from Iraq, however the bill was defeated. As of the sixth anniversary of the September 11 attacks in 2001, Kanjorski's position on the war in Iraq appeared to be that he would vote for redeployment, but not as a condition of continued funding for the war until and unless the expected presidential veto of such a bill would be overridden.

After the August 1, 2007, collapse of the I-35W Mississippi River bridge in Minneapolis, Minnesota, Kanjorski said he believed the $250 million bill passed by Congress to rebuild the bridge was improper because it exceeded the normal $100 million limit for emergency relief projects. He added in saying that Minnesotans "discovered they were going to get all the money from the federal government and they were taking all they could get" and that they took the opportunity "to screw us."

In March 2010, Kanjorski supported and voted for the federal health care reform legislation. Later that year, Kanjorski was instrumental in the crafting of the Dodd-Frank Wall Street Reform and Consumer Protection Act, helping draft a considerable portion of this legislation. When the bill was signed into law by President Barack Obama in July 2010, Kanjorski appeared with fellow legislators by Obama's side as the President signed the legislation.

One of Kanjorski's final votes in Congress, merely weeks before his final term ended, was a vote against the Tax Relief, Unemployment Insurance Reauthorization, and Job Creation Act of 2010, legislation signed into law by President Obama in December 2010. Kanjorski's vote in opposition to the bill stemmed from his disenchantment with the fact that the legislation extended President George W. Bush's tax cuts for the wealthiest Americans.

=== 2008 financial crisis ===
In an interview on C-SPAN on January 27, 2009, Kanjorski defended the original emergency actions by the United States government to halt the 2008 financial crisis in September 2008. Kanjorski stated that the move to raise the guarantee money funds up to $250,000 was an emergency measure to stave off a massive money market "electronic run" on the banks that removed $550 billion from the system in a matter of hours on the morning of September 18. He further asserted that, if not stopped, the run would not only have caused the American economy to crash immediately, within 24 hours it would have brought down the world economy as well. On February 10, 2009, the financial writer Daniel Gross subsequently confirmed some elements of the story on Countdown with Keith Olbermann, but he prefaced his remarks by saying "I don't know if his numbers are 100 percent correct". Felix Salmon of Condé Nast Portfolio also questioned why Kanjorski's account had not been stated before.

== Political campaigns ==
In 1980, Dan Flood, who had represented the 11th District for most of the time since 1945, resigned. Kanjorski ran in the crowded special election as an independent, finishing behind State Representative Ray Musto. He ran against Musto in the Democratic primary later that year, but finished third. Musto lost to Republican James L. Nelligan in the general election. In 1984, after sitting out the 1982 campaign, Kanjorski defeated incumbent Frank G. Harrison, who had defeated Nelligan in 1982, in the primary. He won the general election by a solid 17-point margin, even as Ronald Reagan carried the district in his landslide reelection bid.

In 1986, Kanjorski faced a younger, well-financed Republican opponent in Marc Holtzman. The race was initially seen as one of the hottest in the country. However, Kanjorski won by 41 points, his largest margin of victory in a contested election. He was unopposed in 1988 and 1990 and did not face another credible opponent until 2002, when he faced Lou Barletta, the mayor of Hazleton. Kanjorski defeated Barletta by 13 points. The margin would have likely been closer had the state legislature not shifted heavily Democratic Scranton and most of surrounding Lackawanna County from the nearby 10th District to the 11th.

=== 2008 ===
After facing no major-party opposition in 2004 and a nominal Republican challenger in 2006, Kanjorski faced Lou Barletta again in 2008. Since the 2002 race, Barletta had become well known for his opposition to illegal immigration. In 2008, Fox News broadcast a segment accusing Kanjorski of obtaining $10 million in earmarks for a company run by his family.

Multiple polls had shown Kanjorski trailing by as many as five percentage points, and the race was pegged as one of the nation's most competitive leading into the 2008 elections. Kanjorski was one of the few House Democrats in the Northeast in any danger of being unseated. However, Kanjorski won in a much more competitive race than his first matchup with Barletta, taking 52 percent of the vote to Barletta's 48 percent, even as Barack Obama easily carried the district. Kanjorski lost three of the district's five counties, including Luzerne County, where both he and Barletta live. However, as in 2002, Kanjorski swamped Barletta in Lackawanna County, winning by 12,500 votes (20 percent); he lost the area he had represented prior to the 2000 redistricting by almost 4,000 votes.

=== 2010 ===
Kanjorski won against Corey O'Brien and Brian Kelly in the May 2010 Democratic primary with 49.3% of the vote.

Barletta challenged Kanjorski again in 2010. This time, Barletta managed to defeat Kanjorski with 55 percent of the vote, largely due to winning Luzerne County by almost 10,000 votes. Kanjorski was dogged by some of the more incendiary comments he made during the campaign, such as his comments about Republican Florida gubernatorial candidate Rick Scott: "Instead of running for governor of Florida, they ought to have him and shoot him. Put him against the wall and shoot him."

== Post-political career ==
After leaving office, Kanjorski and his long-time chief of staff Karen Feather formed Kanjorski & Associates, LLC, a public policy consulting firm.

U.S. House of Representatives
Preceded by Frank Harrison	Member of the U.S. House of Representatives from Pennsylvania's 11th congressional district 1985–2011	Succeeded by Lou Barletta
U.S. order of precedence (ceremonial)
Preceded by Alan Mollohan as Former U.S. Representative	Order of precedence of the United States as Former U.S. Representative	Succeeded by Bob Goodlatte as Former U.S. Representative
