= Jim Haddock =

American politician

Member of the Pennsylvania House of Representatives from the 118th district
- Incumbent
- Assumed office January 3, 2023
- Preceded by: Michael B. Carroll

Personal details
- Party: Democratic
- Education: Bucknell University; Luzerne County Community College
- Website: Official website

Jim Haddock is a Democratic member of the Pennsylvania House of Representatives, representing the 118th District since 2023.

== Career ==
Haddock served as the clerk of courts and prothonotary manager in Luzerne County for 10 years.

Political offices
Pennsylvania House of Representatives
Preceded by Michael B. Carroll	Member of the Pennsylvania House of Representatives from the 118th district 2023–present	Incumbent
