= James Musto =

American politician

Member of the Pennsylvania House of Representatives from the 118th district
- In office 1969 – May 1, 1971
- Preceded by: District created
- Succeeded by: Ray Musto

Member of the Pennsylvania House of Representatives from the Luzerne County district
- In office 1949–1968

Personal details
- Born: October 12, 1899
- Died: May 1, 1971 (aged 71) Pittston, Pennsylvania, U.S.
- Party: Democratic

James Musto (October 12, 1899 – May 2, 1971) was a former Democratic member of the Pennsylvania House of Representatives.

== Family ==
His son was Ray Musto who also served in the Pennsylvania House of Representatives and later in the United States House of Representatives.
