= Maryanne Petrilla =

Luzerne County Board of Commissioners, Chairman
- Constituency: Luzerne County, Pennsylvania

Personal details
- Party: Democratic
- Children: 2
- Website: www.luzernecounty.org

Maryanne C. Petrilla is the former Luzerne County Commissioner Chairperson, before the county adopted a Home Rule Charter in 2012. As of 2011, she resided in Sugarloaf Township, Pennsylvania. She is the second female Commissioner Chairperson in the county's history after Rose Tucker. Petrilla is a graduate of the McCann School of Business and Technology.
