= James Connerton =

American priest

Fr. James W. Connerton, C.S.C., a priest and religious of the Congregation of Holy Cross served as the first president of King's College in Wilkes-Barre, Pennsylvania from 1946 to 1949. Before moving to Wilkes-Barre, he served as the director of the Moreau Seminary Choir and served as an administrator at the University of Notre Dame in Notre Dame, Indiana.

Fr. Connerton described his college's mission in the following words: "King's teaches students not only how to make a living, but how to live."

Preceded by Position established	President of King's College; 1946–1949	Succeeded by John J. Lane
