= Thomas J. O'Hara =

Catholic priest and university president (born 1949)

Thomas J. O'Hara (born March 16, 1949) served as Provincial Superior of the U.S. Province of Priests and Brothers of the Congregation of Holy Cross from his election to the position on June 15, 2012 (The Feast of the Most Sacred Heart of Jesus, the Patron of Holy Cross Priests) until the election of Father Bill Lies on June 14, 2018.

O'Hara was born in Hazleton, Pennsylvania. He attended Moreau Seminary, on the campus of the University of Notre Dame, from 1973 to 1975. He professed First Vows on Aug. 3, 1974 and Final Vows on Sept. 3, 1977. He was ordained to the diaconate on Jan. 15, 1978, at Our Lady of Good Counsel Parish in Brooklyn, N.Y., and was ordained to the priesthood on June 10, 1978.

O’Hara graduated from King's College (Pennsylvania) in 1971 with a bachelor’s degree in political science. He earned a master’s in theology from Notre Dame in 1977 and a doctorate in political science from American University in Washington, D.C., in 1988.

O'Hara's first teaching assignment in 1975 was as professor of English at Notre Dame College (Dhaka) in Bangladesh, where he was assisting in relief work with Mother Teresa's Missionaries of Charity. He has worked in parish ministry in Brooklyn, N.Y., and served in the Holy Cross missions in Bangladesh and Uganda.

He was a resident assistant at Notre Dame from 1976 to 1977, associate pastor at Our Lady of Good Counsel from 1977 to 1982, chaplain at Holy Cross Hospital, Silver Spring, Md., and chaplain to the Holy Cross brothers at Bishop McNamara High School in Forestville, Md., from 1982 to 1984, where he served on the high school's board of directors. He was an adjunct professor teaching a religion and politics course at The American University (1987) and a priest-in-residence at St. Ann Parish, Washington, D.C., from 1984 to 1988.

O’Hara joined the faculty of King's in 1988 as assistant professor of government and politics and became the eighth president of his alma mater in 1999. He was the first King's alumnus to be named president, as well as its second longest-serving president. He left the post in 2011.

He also served as professor of political science at the Philosophical Centre of Jinja in Uganda from 1994 until he returned to King's in 1996 as a professor and associate vice president for academic affairs.

Among his many awards, O'Hara was presented an honorary degree by the University of Scranton (Pa.) in 2008 and the University of Portland (Ore.) in 2012. He also was awarded the Exemplar Award from the University of Notre Dame Alumni Association, the New York State Award for Dedication to Youth (1982) and the King's College All College Award for Faculty (1992) and Administrators (1998).

O'Hara continues to serve on Notre Dame's board of trustees, as well as that of St. Edward's University. He has served on the boards of a number of education, religious and non-profit organizations throughout his career, including the Greater Wilkes-Barre Chamber of business and Industry, the Diamond City Partnership, CityVest, St. Vincent De Paul Kitchen, King's/St. Mary's Developmental Day Care Center, Healthy Northeast Pennsylvania. In addition, Father O'Hara has held membership on the board of trustees of Stonehill College, Easton, Massachusetts, and the advisory council of the Jewish Family Service of Greater Wilkes-Barre.

O'Hara was elected as the new provincial superior of the Congregation of Holy Cross, United States Province of Priests and Brothers by the Provincial Chapter in Portland, Ore., on Friday, June 15 (Feast Day of the Most Sacred Heart of Jesus).

Preceded by James Lackenmier	President of King's College; 1999 – 2011	Succeeded by John J. Ryan
