= Edward Bonin =

American politician

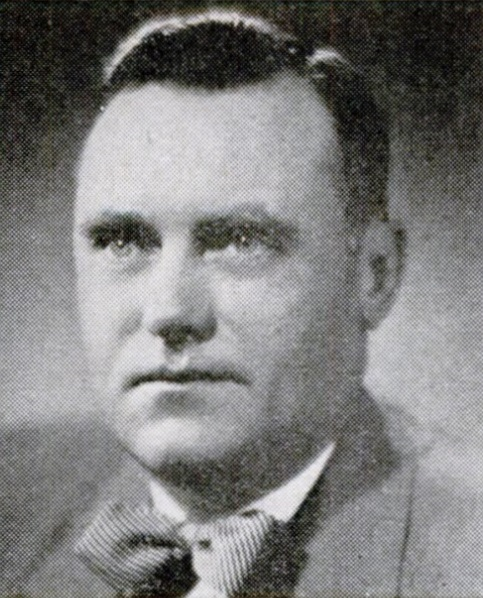
- from 1953's Pocket Congressional Directory of the Eighty-Third Congress

Member of the U.S. House of Representatives from Pennsylvania's 11th district
- In office January 3, 1953 – January 3, 1955
- Preceded by: Daniel Flood
- Succeeded by: Daniel Flood

Mayor of Hazleton, Pennsylvania
- In office 1951–1952
- Preceded by: Maurice Llewellyn
- Succeeded by: William Steele (acting)

Personal details
- Born: Edward John Bonin; December 23, 1904 Hazleton, Pennsylvania, U.S.
- Died: December 20, 1990 (aged 85) Hazleton, Pennsylvania, U.S.
- Party: Republican

Edward John Bonin (December 23, 1904 – December 20, 1990) was a Republican member of the U.S. House of Representatives from Pennsylvania.

== Life and career ==
Bonin was born in Hazleton, Pennsylvania, of Polish descent. He served in the United States Navy from 1922 to 1926. He graduated from Wyoming Seminary in Kingston, Pennsylvania in 1929, from Dickinson College in Carlisle, Pennsylvania, in 1933, and Temple University Law School in Philadelphia, Pennsylvania, in 1937. During the Second World War he served in the United States Army. From 1949 to 1952 he was assistant district attorney of Luzerne County, Pennsylvania, and Mayor of Hazleton, from 1951 to 1953.

Bonin was elected in 1952 as a Republican to the 83rd United States Congress, defeating incumbent Democratic Congressman Daniel J. Flood but he was an unsuccessful candidate for reelection in 1954 in a re-match against Flood. After his term in congress, he served as assistant to the Philadelphia Regional Director of the Post Office Department from February 1955 to March 1963, and General Attorney for the Post Office Department in Washington, D.C. from March 1963 to December 1966.

== See also ==
U.S. House of Representatives
Preceded by Daniel J. Flood	Member of the U.S. House of Representatives from Pennsylvania's 11th congressional district 1953–1955	Succeeded by Daniel J. Flood
