= Matthew Salleh =

Australian filmmaker

Matthew Salleh is an Australian filmmaker based in Brooklyn, New York, known for making documentary films with his personal and professional partner, Rose Tucker. They are the founders and owners of Urtext Films. They are known for their documentary feature films, including We Don't Deserve Dogs (2020) and Slice of Life: The American Dream. In Former Pizza Huts (2024).

== Early life and education ==
Matthew Salleh is from Adelaide, South Australia, as is Rose Tucker. (Note: They talk in this interview about having to leave the US every 2 years to renew their visas.) Tucker is a science graduate of Flinders University (2006), who also did a diploma in tourism there. Salleh did an arts degree at university, and neither has had professional training in making films. They met around 2007, and became professional and personal partners.

== Career ==
Salleh and Tucker started their careers in filmmaking making short films. They established the Urtext film company in Adelaide. They were based in Australia until relocating to Brooklyn, New York in 2016. Salleh acts as director, cinematographer, and co-editor of their films, while Tucker is producer and co-editor.

The short film Central Texas Barbecue (2014) is a short documentary about Texans who cook meat in pits. Their first feature documentary Barbecue (2017) highlights the culture of barbecuing meat and other foods in various societies. The filmmakers travelled to 13 countries, with the resulting film including a restaurant in a Syrian refugee camp, nomads in Mongolia, Hāngī in New Zealand, braai in South Africa, yakitori in Japan, and many others. It received a James Beard Award.

Their 2020 documentary We Don't Deserve Dogs, that explores the relationship between men and dogs, was scheduled have its world premiere at SXSW festival in the US in March 2020, but owing to the COVID-19 pandemic, the event was cancelled. We Don't Deserve Dogs was released later in 2020 at a number of film festivals, including Warsaw Film Festival, Nashville Film Festival, Gems Film Festival (Miami), and Brisbane International Film Festival. Salleh wrote about how he made the film.

Their documentary feature, Slice of Life: The American Dream, In Former Pizza Huts, premiered at SXSW Sydney and Chicago International Film Festival. It was released in Australian cinemas on 7 November 2024.

== Filmography ==
- Balloons for Sale (short film, 2009)
- Pablo's Villa (short film, 2013)
- Central Texas Barbecue (short film, 2014)
- Barbecue (2017)
- We Don't Deserve Dogs (2020)
- Slice of Life: The American Dream, In Former Pizza Huts (2024)
