= Thomas Tigue =

American politician (1945–2016)

Thomas M. "Tom" Tigue

Member of the Pennsylvania House of Representatives from the 118th district
- In office January 6, 1981 – November 30, 2006
- Preceded by: Raphael Musto
- Succeeded by: Michael Carroll

Personal details
- Born: Thomas Michael Tigue; August 24, 1945 Hughestown, Pennsylvania, U.S.
- Died: February 1, 2016 (aged 70) Hughestown, Pennsylvania, U.S.
- Party: Democratic
- Spouse: Dianne Marie Walsh (m. 1968; died 2015)
- Children: 4
- Education: King's College (B.A.)
- Awards: Silver Star

Military service
- Allegiance: United States
- Branch/service: U.S. Marine Corps
- Years of service: 1968–1971
- Rank: Colonel
- Battles/wars: Vietnam War

Thomas M. Tigue (August 24, 1945 – February 1, 2016) was a United States Marine Corps Officer and combat veteran, an American politician, a Democratic member of the Pennsylvania House of Representatives.

== Early life ==
Thomas Michael Tigue was born in Hughestown, Pennsylvania, to Michael F. Tigue and his wife. He graduated from St. John's the Evangelist High School in 1964. He earned a B.A. degree in government from King's College in Wilkes-Barre, Pennsylvania, in 1968.

== Career ==
He served in the U.S. Marine Corps in the Vietnam War, earning a Silver Star. He served 27 years in the Marine Corps Reserve. He has pursued graduate studies at Marywood University. He was a Legislative Fellow at East Stroudsburg University and a member of the Pittston Area School Board.

He was first elected to represent the 118th legislative district in the Pennsylvania House of Representatives in 1980. During his tenure, Tigue served as the Democratic chair of the House Veterans Affairs and Emergency Preparedness Committee, where he was instrumental in establishing the Military Family Relief Assistance Program, a program providing financial assistance to eligible Pennsylvania service members and their family members who are financially impacted by military service. He also co-sponsored of legislation giving the Governor the authority to call members of the Pennsylvania National Guard to state active duty in the event of emergencies in other states. He retired prior to the 2006 elections, working to help Michael B. Carroll succeed him.

In December 2006, he became Managing Director of the Delaware River Maritime Enterprise Council. In July 2007, he was inducted into the Pennsylvania Department of Military and Veterans Affairs Hall of Fame. In 2007, Tigue sought an appointment to the Luzerne County Commission to replace Todd Vonderheid, who decided to step down. A panel of nine judges from the Court of Common Pleas were responsible for the appointment. However, Tigue was defeated by former commissioner Rose Tucker 5–4.

== Personal life ==
Tigue married Dianne Marie Walsh, of Hughestown, on September 14, 1968. She died in 2015. Together, they had four children: Thomas, Tracy, Kristin, and Colleen.

== Death ==
Tigue died on February 1, 2016, from Stage IV lung cancer.

== U.S. decorations and badges ==
Silver Star
