= Mary Lucy Dosh =

American Catholic sister

Sister Mary Lucy Dosh
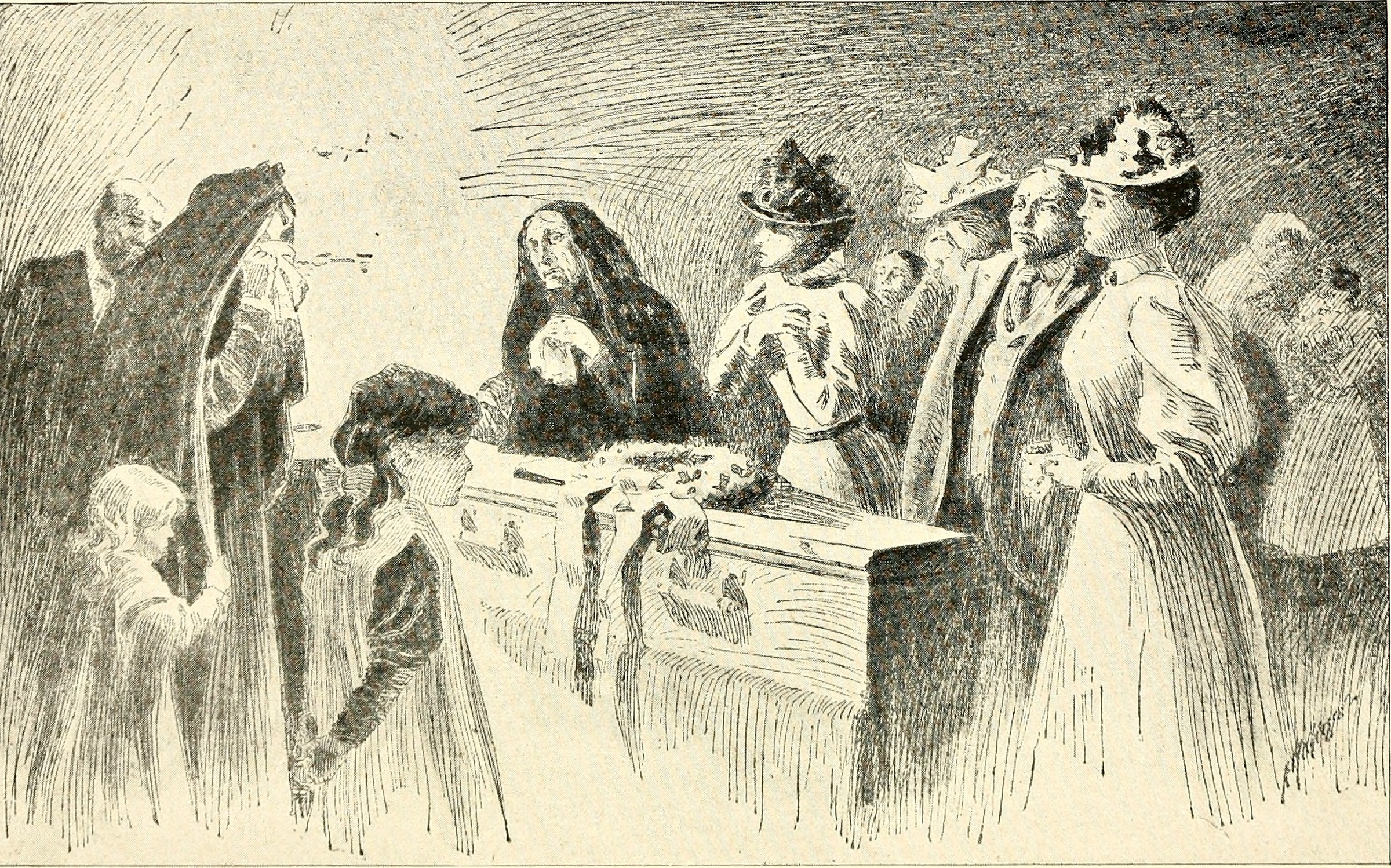
- Funeral of Marcy Lucy Dosh (illustration from Angels of the battlefield - a history of the labors of the Catholic sisterhoods in the late civil war (1898))
- Born: Barbara Dosh; September 15, 1839; Luzerne County, Pennsylvania, US
- Died: December 29, 1861 (aged 22); Western Kentucky
- Occupation: Volunteer nurse
- Years active: 1860–1861

Barbara "Mary Lucy" Dosh (September 15, 1839 – December 29, 1861) was a Catholic sister in the order of the Sisters of Nazareth. She was a volunteer nurse in Western Kentucky during the American Civil War, caring for both Union troops and Confederate prisoners of war, and died in the course of duty from typhoid fever. In 2012, the United States Congress passed a resolution honoring Dosh's nursing care given to both Union and Confederate soldiers.

== Early life and education ==
Barbara Dosh was born in Luzerne County, Pennsylvania, on September 15, 1839. She was orphaned at age 11 and she and her sister went to live in Louisville, Kentucky, with the Sisters of Charity of Nazareth. Dosh's talent for music was recognized by Mother Catherine Spalding of the Sisters of Charity of Nazareth and she went to St. Vincent in Union County, Kentucky, to study music.

Dosh decided to join the order of the Sisters of Nazareth and took the name Sister Mary Lucy Dosh. She went to Paducah, Kentucky, to teach music at St Mary's Academy in McCracken County. .

== American Civil War ==
In 1861 Dosh volunteered as a nurse during the American Civil War in Western Kentucky. She cared for both Union troops and Confederate prisoners of war at the Paducah Baptist Church.

== Death and legacy ==
While serving as a nurse, Dosh died of typhoid fever on December 29, 1861, a few months into the Civil War. Her casket was carried on the U.S. gunboat Peacock up the Ohio River to Uniontown, Kentucky, under an order of truce with an escort of six Union soldiers and six Confederate soldiers.

In December, 2012 the United States Congress passed a resolution honoring Dosh's nursing care given to both Union and Confederate soldiers.
