= Ray Musto =

American politician (1929–2014)

Raphael Musto
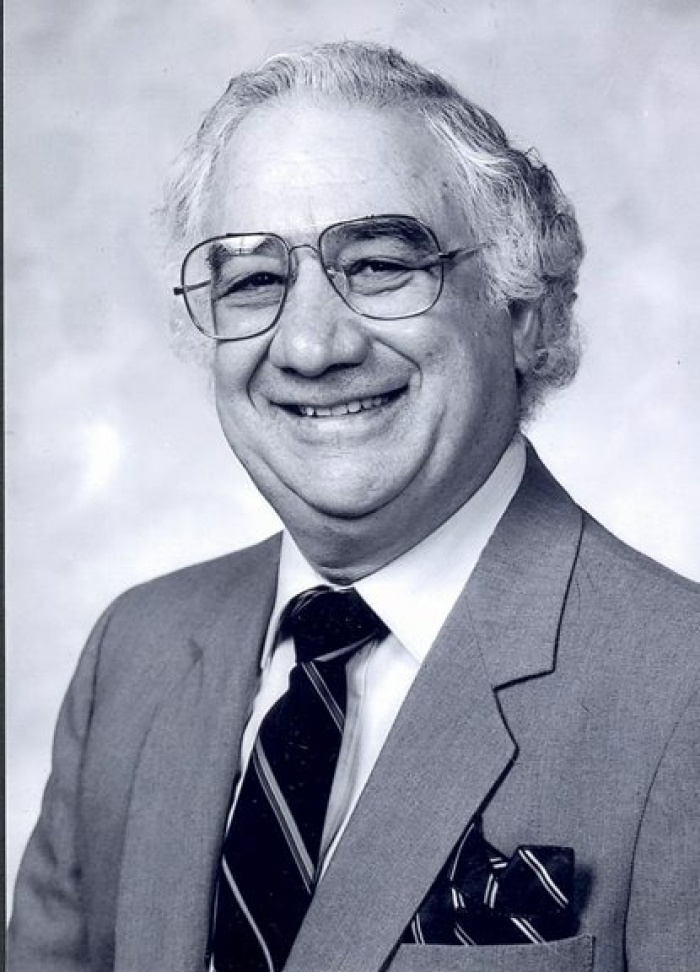

Member of the Pennsylvania Senate from the 14th district
- In office January 4, 1983 – November 30, 2010
- Preceded by: Martin Murray
- Succeeded by: John Yudichak

Member of the U.S. House of Representatives from Pennsylvania's 11th district
- In office April 9, 1980 – January 3, 1981
- Preceded by: Daniel J. Flood
- Succeeded by: James Nelligan

Member of the Pennsylvania House of Representatives from the 118th district
- In office January 5, 1971 – April 15, 1980
- Preceded by: James Musto
- Succeeded by: Thomas Tigue

Personal details
- Born: March 30, 1929 Pittston, Pennsylvania, U.S.
- Died: April 24, 2014 (aged 85) Pittston, Pennsylvania, U.S.
- Party: Democratic
- Spouse: Frances Panzetta Musto

Raphael John Musto (March 30, 1929 – April 24, 2014) was an American politician from Pennsylvania who served as a Democratic Party member of the U.S. House of Representatives for Pennsylvania's 11th congressional district from 1980 to 1981. He served as a member of the Pennsylvania House of Representatives for the 118th district from 1971 to 1980 and of the Pennsylvania Senate for the 14th district from 1982 until his retirement in 2010.

== Early life and education ==
Musto was born in Pittston, Pennsylvania, and graduated from Pittston Township High School. He served in the United States Army from 1951 to 1953 during the Korean War. He graduated from Kings College in Wilkes-Barre in 1971.

== Career ==
When his father, longtime State Representative James Musto, died in 1971, the younger Musto won a special election to fill his seat. He was elected to a full term in 1972 and was reelected three times.

In 1980, longtime Congressman Dan Flood, who had represented Pennsylvania's 11th congressional district for most of the time since 1945, resigned after being censured for bribery. Musto won a four-way special election for the remainder of Flood's term. He ran for a full term later that year, but was narrowly defeated by Republican challenger James Nelligan, whom Musto had defeated in the special election.

While in Congress, Musto met with undercover FBI agents posing as representatives of a fictitious Middle Eastern Sheik known as the ABSCAM sting operation. Musto declined an implied bribe from the FBI agents and was never charged in the investigation.

Musto was elected to the state Senate in 1982 and was reelected six times, representing a district consisting of Wilkes-Barre and portions of the Poconos. He did not seek re-election in 2010, choosing instead to retire at the end of his term.

On November 23, 2010, a federal grand jury issued a six-count indictment against Musto, charging him with accepting more than $28,000 from an unnamed company and individual in exchange for his help in obtaining grants and funding. Musto was also charged with accepting $3,000 from another unnamed individual in a separate incident. Musto denied any wrongdoing. The trial was delayed multiple times due to Musto's declining health.

Musto was released from a federal medical prison in North Carolina in April 2014. He had been declared mentally unfit to stand trial and was diagnosed with advanced stage lymph-node cancer while being treated at the prison. He died at his home in Pittston on April 24.

The criminal case against him was dismissed posthumously on April 30, 2014, by Federal Judge A. Richard Caputo.

U.S. House of Representatives
Preceded by Daniel J. Flood	Member of the U.S. House of Representatives from Pennsylvania's 11th congressional district 1980–1981	Succeeded by James L. Nelligan
