= Frank Harrison (politician) =

American politician (1940–2009)

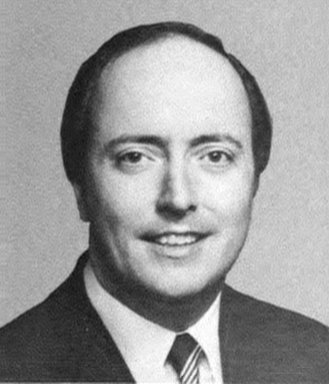

Member of the U.S. House of Representatives from Pennsylvania's 11th district
- In office January 3, 1983 – January 3, 1985
- Preceded by: James L. Nelligan
- Succeeded by: Paul Kanjorski

Personal details
- Born: February 2, 1940 Washington, D.C., U.S.
- Died: June 3, 2009 (aged 69) Galveston, Texas, U.S.
- Party: Democratic
- Education: Harvard Law School

Frank Girard Harrison (February 2, 1940 – June 3, 2009) was a one-term Democratic member of the U.S. House of Representatives from Pennsylvania.

== Biography ==
Harrison was born in Washington, D.C., and grew up in Wilkes-Barre, Pennsylvania. He graduated from his hometown's King's College in 1961, and Harvard Law School in 1964. Harrison served in the United States Air Force as a captain from 1966 to 1969. He was a college professor at Trinity University from 1969 to 1982.

Harrison was elected in 1982 as a Democrat to the 98th United States Congress. He was an unsuccessful candidate for renomination in 1984.

He was a visiting scholar in residence at King's College in Wilkes-Barre. He died in Galveston, Texas, on June 3, 2009, at the age of 69.

U.S. House of Representatives
Preceded by James L. Nelligan	Member of the U.S. House of Representatives from Pennsylvania's 11th congressional district 1983–1985	Succeeded by Paul E. Kanjorski
