= Daniel Flood =

American politician (1903–1994)

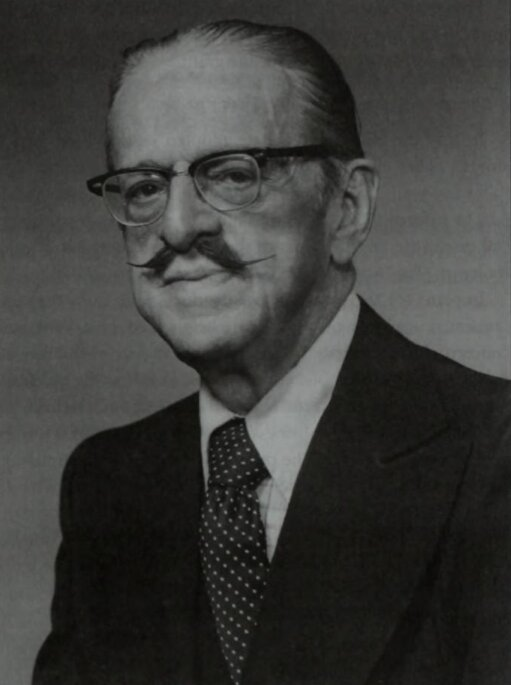

Member of the U.S. House of Representatives from Pennsylvania's 11th district
- In office January 3, 1955 – January 31, 1980
- Preceded by: Edward Bonin
- Succeeded by: Ray Musto
- In office January 3, 1949 – January 3, 1953
- Preceded by: Mitchell Jenkins
- Succeeded by: Edward Bonin
- In office January 3, 1945 – January 3, 1947
- Preceded by: John Murphy
- Succeeded by: Mitchell Jenkins

Personal details
- Born: Daniel John Flood; November 26, 1903 Hazleton, Pennsylvania, U.S.
- Died: May 28, 1994 (aged 90) Wilkes-Barre, Pennsylvania, U.S.
- Party: Democratic
- Spouse: Catherine Swank
- Education: Syracuse University (BA); Harvard University; Dickinson School of Law (LLB)

Daniel John Flood (November 26, 1903 – May 28, 1994) was an American attorney and politician who served as the U.S. representative for Pennsylvania's 11th congressional district for 15 nonconsecutive terms. A Democrat, he was first elected in 1944 and served continuously from 1955 to 1980. Flood was credited with leading the effort to help the Wilkes-Barre area recover from the effects of the 1972 Agnes Flood.

A trial on bribery charges that Flood had accepted more than $50,000 in payoffs ended with a hung jury. A retrial was repeatedly delayed because of treatment for several ailments; federal prosecutors suggested that the treatments were being postponed as a stalling measure. In 1980, he resigned from Congress before pleading guilty to a single count of payoffs, for which he was sentenced to one year of probation.

== Early life and career ==
Flood was born into an ethnic Irish family in Hazleton in Northeastern Pennsylvania, the son of Sarah (McCarthy) and Patrick Flood. He attended the public schools of Wilkes-Barre, Pennsylvania, and St. Augustine, Florida. He graduated from Syracuse University in 1924. He attended Harvard Law School and was graduated from Dickinson School of Law in Carlisle in 1929.

He was admitted to the bar in 1930 and opened a practice in Wilkes-Barre. He was an attorney for the federal Home Owners' Loan Corporation in 1934 and 1935, during the Great Depression. He joined the Democratic Party, inspired by President Franklin D. Roosevelt.

Flood studied acting in his early school days, a skill he fancied and often used while serving as a member of Congress. Flood sported a signature waxed moustache from that time throughout his career, and had a penchant for wearing white suits. His flamboyant style, dress and speech were often compared to that of a Shakespearean actor. He persuaded his friend James Karen to begin his acting career, recruiting him into a production at the Little Theatre of Wilkes-Barre. He met his wife Catherine Swank when they were both cast in a production at the same theatre.

== Political career ==
Flood was appointed as the deputy attorney general for the Commonwealth of Pennsylvania and counsel for the Pennsylvania Liquor Control Board from 1935 to 1939. In 1941, he was appointed director of the State Bureau of Public Assistance Disbursements by State Treasurer G. Harold Wagner, and executive assistant to the State Treasurer from 1941 to 1944.

=== United States House of Representatives ===
Flood made his first run for office in 1942, when he was the Democratic candidate in a special election to replace Congressman J. Harold Flannery in what was then Pennsylvania's 12th congressional district, based in Wilkes-Barre. He narrowly lost to Republican Thomas B. Miller. Flood ran against Miller again in the general election later that year and lost by a wider margin.

However, he ran against Miller in 1944, in what had been renumbered as the 11th District and won. He was defeated for reelection in 1946 due to a nationwide Republican landslide, but regained his seat in 1948. He was reelected in 1950, only to be swept out in 1952, losing to Republican Edward J. Bonin in former General Dwight Eisenhower's massive landslide for presidency. Eisenhower had commanded the Allied Forces in Europe during World War II and led them to defeat Germany. Flood was reelected in 1954 in a re-match against Congressman Bonin. After a close reelection bid in 1956, he was reelected for 11 more terms without serious opposition.

The seniority he established led him to being a member of the important House Appropriations Committee. In that position, he contributed strongly to passage of Medicare, economic development initiatives for Appalachia, and the Federal Coal Mine Health and Safety Act of 1969.

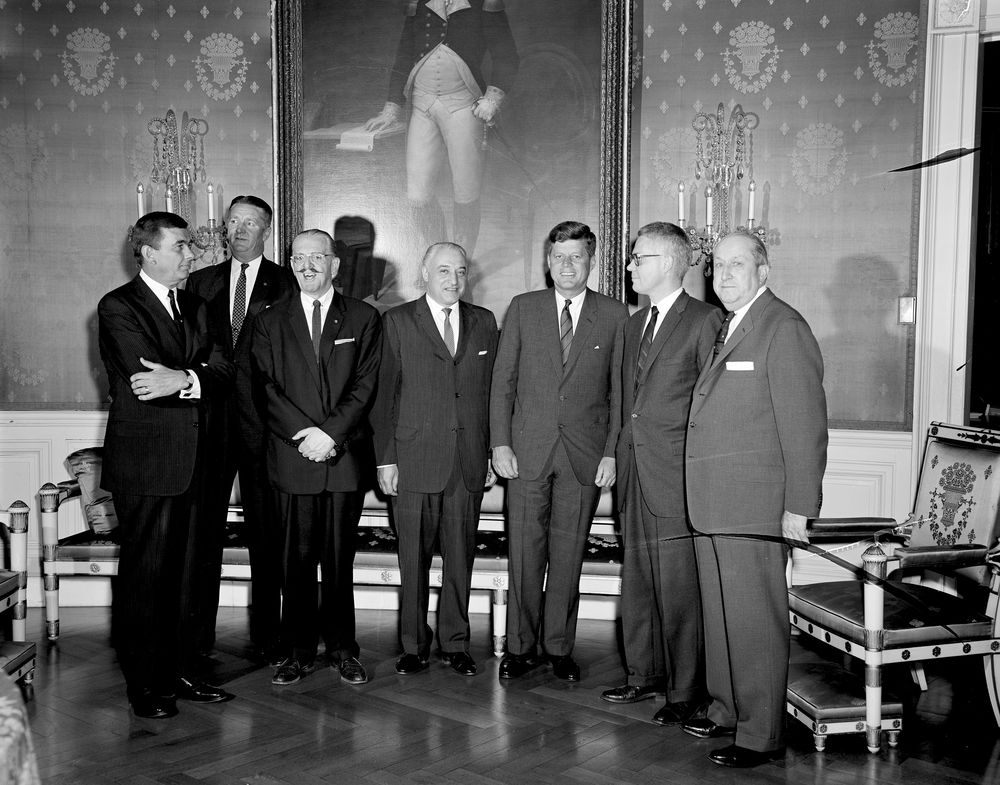
Congressional Coffee Hour (House of Representatives). L-R: Congressman John M. Slack Jr. (West Virginia); Congressman Odin Langen (Minnesota); Congressman Daniel Flood (Pennsylvania); Congressman Dominick V. Daniels (New Jersey); President John F. Kennedy; Congressman John B. Anderson (Illinois); Congressman Thomas J. Lane (Massachusetts). Blue Room, White House, Washington, D.C.

Flood persuaded Senator John F. Kennedy from Massachusetts to campaign in his home district. He strongly supported Kennedy's later campaign and presidency.

Flood used his considerable influence in Congress to develop ways to transition the economy of his district, which was devastated when the anthracite coal mining industry took a severe downturn. While in Congress, Flood was credited with sponsoring the Area Redevelopment Act in 1961 and the Federal Coal Mine Health and Safety Act of 1969.

Flood worked hard to rebuild his district in the aftermath of the devastating flooding from Hurricane Agnes. When the tropical storm remnants of Hurricane Agnes overwhelmed the Susquehanna River watershed in 1972, causing major flooding all along the river, one of the hardest-hit locations was Wilkes-Barre's business and residential areas. Flood, subcommittee chairman of the House Appropriations Committee, with years of clout accumulated while in office, was credited with limiting federal red tape to repair damage from what was then the most-damaging hurricane ever recorded in the U.S. Mustering air and boat rescue, bringing President Richard M. Nixon in to survey flood damage, and establishing a federal response – all were credited to Flood. "It took a Flood to tame a flood" was his catchphrase.

In the 1972 presidential election he supported Republican Richard Nixon over Democrat George McGovern. He refused to accompany McGovern during his visit to Wilkes-Barre after the 1972 flood. McGovern held a press conference at the Hotel Sterling.

In the neighboring city of Scranton, Flood was occasionally accused of favoring Wilkes-Barre. (Scranton was not in the 11th Congressional District during the time Flood served in Congress.) Flood also is purported to have said "No self respecting man from Wilkes-Barre would ever date the best looking blonde from Scranton." He is often cited as the source of the naming of the Wilkes-Barre/Scranton International Airport (with Wilkes-Barre first, despite being the smaller of the two cities and being second alphabetically).

==== Controversies, censure, and resignation ====
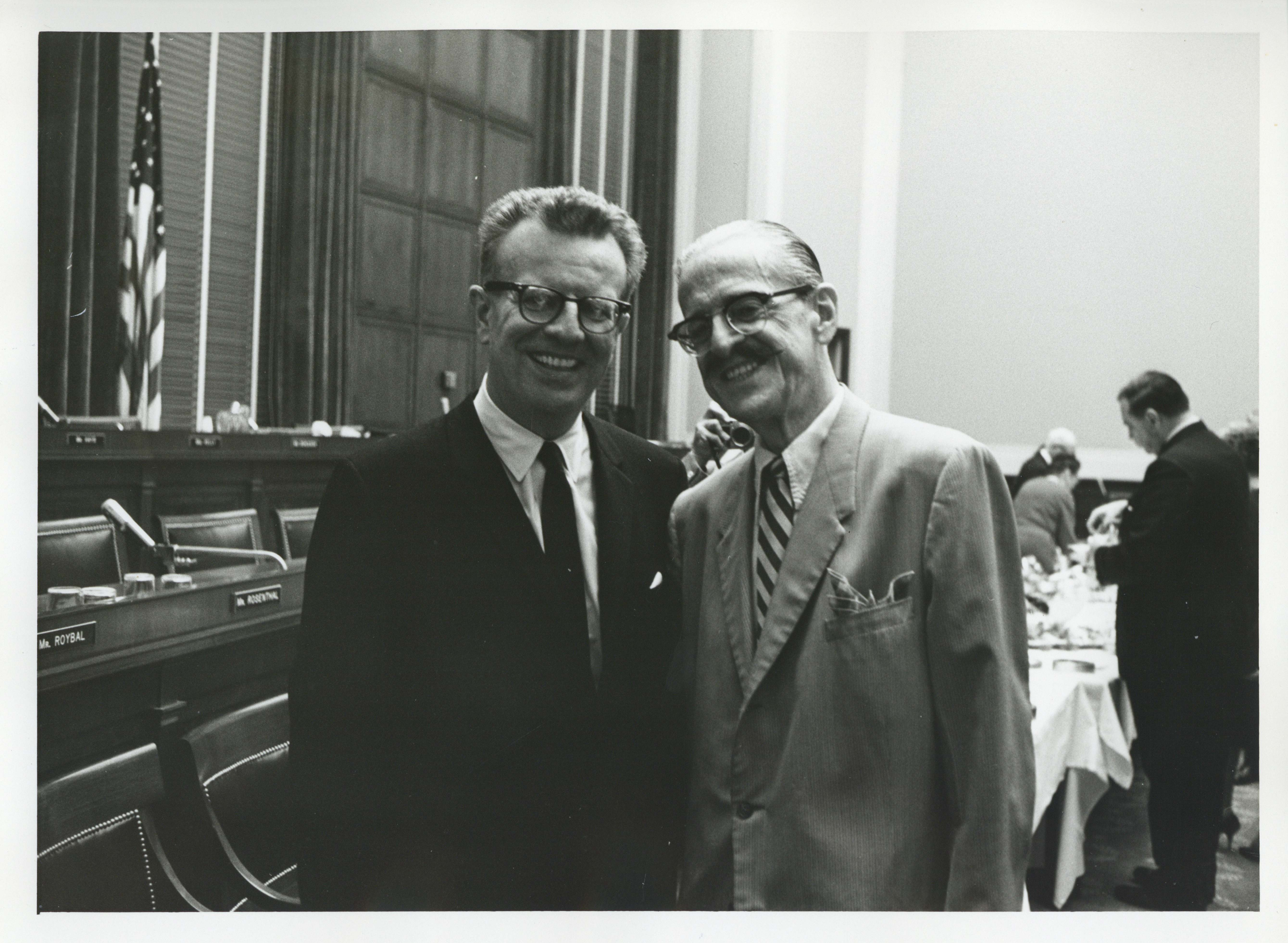
Larry O'Brien and Daniel Flood posing for a picture.

Flood was investigated by at least eight separate U.S. Attorney's offices and had 175 possible cases pending against him. The Washington Post reported in February 1978 that Flood was accused of helping steer federal grant money to the B'nai Torah Institute, a community service organization in New York from which Flood reported receipt of campaign funds totaling nearly $1,000 plus an undisclosed honorarium.

Flood's former aide, Stephen Elko, testified that Flood was a 'muscler' who used his influence to direct federal contracts to people and corporations in exchange for cash kickbacks. The 'Flood-Medico-Bufalino Triangle' was one such instance. Medico Industries of Plains Township received, with Flood's help, a $3,900,000 Department of Defense contract to produce 600,000 warheads for use in the Vietnam War. Mafia crime boss Russell Bufalino, who frequented Medico offices, was an associate of general manager William 'Billy' Medico and president Philip Medico. The latter was known to be a caporegime in the Bufalino crime family. The FBI discovered that Flood would often travel in the Medico Industries jet.

As a result of Elko's testimony, the United States Department of Justice and House Committee on Standards of Official Conduct (now the United States House Committee on Ethics) began investigations of Flood in early 1978. On September 5, 1978, a federal grand jury indicted Flood on three counts of perjury on charges that he lied about payoffs.

During the 96th United States Congress in 1979, Flood was censured for bribery. The allegations led to his resignation from Congress on January 31, 1980.

==== Death ====
Flood died in Wilkes-Barre on May 28, 1994. His funeral was held on May 30 in St. John's Church in Wilkes-Barre, with eulogies given by then-Governor Bob Casey and Representatives Paul Kanjorski and Joseph McDade. He was interred in the family plot at St. Mary's Cemetery in Hanover Township, Pennsylvania.

== Legacy ==
With the nickname "Dapper Dan" for what Time called his "villainous-looking waxed mustache" and "eccentric clothes," Flood is regarded as a folk hero in northeastern Pennsylvania, where he worked for economic development initiatives in the Appalachian region. He also had worked to pass legislation to improve conditions for miners and protect their health. He is remembered by his constituency for his weekly televised messages from Washington, which were a staple of Sunday morning television for years. He was known to attend virtually any public event that took place in his district.

Daniel J. Flood Elementary School in the Wilkes-Barre Area School District is named in his honor, as are many other places in Northeastern Pennsylvania.

On Saturday, October 2, 2010, the Pennsylvania Historical and Museum Commission honored Flood with a plaque as part of the Historical Marker Program. Located on Wilkes-Barre's Public Square in the center of the city, it reads:

Daniel J. Flood (1903–1994). US Congressman from Pa. 11th District, 1944 to 1980. His seniority on the House Appropriations Committee and knowledge of the legislative process enabled him to play a key role establishing national programs such as Medicare, Appalachian urban economic development, and Coal Mine Health and Safety Act. He promoted the strength of US military forces and proliferation of nuclear arms during the Cold War. He resigned from Congress amid controversy.

== See also ==
- List of American federal politicians convicted of crimes
- List of federal political scandals in the United States

U.S. House of Representatives
Preceded by John Murphy	Member of the U.S. House of Representatives from Pennsylvania's 11th congressional district 1945–1947	Succeeded by Mitchell Jenkins
Preceded by Mitchell Jenkins	Member of the U.S. House of Representatives from Pennsylvania's 11th congressional district 1949–1953	Succeeded by Edward Bonin
Preceded by Edward Bonin	Member of the U.S. House of Representatives from Pennsylvania's 11th congressional district 1955–1980	Succeeded by Ray Musto
