= Benjamin F. Evans Jr. =

United States Army general

Benjamin Franklin Evans Jr. (September 3, 1912 – September 2, 1991) was a U.S. Army Major General. He served as the U.S. military's chief of the joint U.S. military aid mission in Turkey.

== Early life, family and personal life ==
Evans Jr was born in Wilkes-Barre, Pennsylvania. He was the son of Brigadier General Benjamin F. Evans Sr. Evans Sr., an artillery general officer, was appointed in 1939 by Pennsylvania Governor Arthur H. James as the Pennsylvania National Guard’s deputy adjutant general. He later became the Pennsylvania National Guard’s adjutant general. He also served as director of Pennsylvania's Selective Service. Evans Sr. retired from the US Army in October 1960 after 40 years in the U.S. military. Evans Jr attended West Point, graduating in 1936.

Evans Jr married Marjorie Hughes Evans (August 19, 1912 - July 14, 1996), a native of Kingston, Pennsylvania. They had five children. Their son, Lt. Benjamin F. Evans III (March 12, 1937 - October 26, 1983), graduated from West Point in 1960.

During World War II, Evan Jr's family resided in Bronxville, New York. After World War II, the family lived in Springfield, Virginia.

== Military career ==
After graduating from West Point in 1936, Evans Jr earned his commission as a 2nd Lieutenant. Evans Jr was stationed at Schofield Barracks in Hawaii during the Japanese's attack on Pearl Harbor on Dec. 7, 1941.

During World War II, Evans Jr commanded an infantry battalion at Guadalcanal. He also commanded two battalions on New Guinea.

Evans Jr. attended National War College, Harvard Business School's Advanced Management Program, the Armed Forces Staff College, and the Command and General Staff College. He also attended Infantry School, later serving at the Continental Army Command, and as infantry forces commander in Iceland.

In 1961, the US Army promoted Evans Jr to Brigadier General.

From 1965 to 1967, Evans Jr led the U.S. military's aid mission in Turkey as chief of the joint U.S. military mission. He also served as chairman of the US Army's War Plans Division in Washington, D.C. He also served as the Commanding General of the XIII Corps at Fort Devens, Massachusetts.

=== Awards and commendations ===
- Silver Star
- Bronze Star
- Two Distinguished Service Medal
- Legion of Merit
- Combat Infantry Badge

== Post-military ==
Evans Jr served as the executive vice president of Savannah, Georgia’s chamber of commerce from 1971 to 1976. In 1985, Evans Jr and his wife moved to the Washington, D.C., metropolitan area.

== Death ==
Evans Jr died on September 2, 1991, of cancer at his residence in Reston, Virginia. He was 78 years old. He was interred at Arlington National Cemetery, Plot Section 1. His wife was interred with him in 1996.
