= Mitchell Jenkins =

American politician

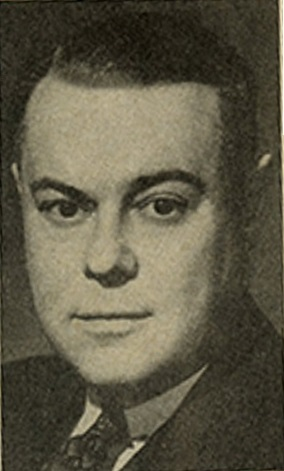
- From 1947's Pictorial Directory of the 80th Congress

Member of the U.S. House of Representatives from Pennsylvania's 11th district
- In office January 3, 1947 – January 3, 1949
- Preceded by: Daniel J. Flood
- Succeeded by: Daniel J. Flood

Personal details
- Born: January 24, 1896 Forty Fort, Pennsylvania, U.S.
- Died: September 15, 1977 (aged 81) Wilkes-Barre, Pennsylvania, U.S.
- Party: Republican
- Education: Wesleyan University; New York University School of Law

Mitchell Jenkins (January 24, 1896 – September 15, 1977) was a U.S. Republican congressional representative from Pennsylvania.

== Biography ==
Mitchell Jenkins was born in Forty Fort, Luzerne County, Pennsylvania. He attended the Kingston, Pennsylvania public elementary schools and the Wyoming Seminary Upper School during his high school years. He graduated from Wesleyan University in Middletown, Connecticut in June 1919 and the New York University School of Law in New York City in June 1923.

Jenkins was admitted to the New York Bar in December 1923 and the Pennsylvania Bar in January 1924 and commenced practice in Wilkes-Barre, Pennsylvania. He served as assistant district attorney of Luzerne County from 1938 to 1946.

In April 1917, Jenkins enlisted as a private in the United States Army and was discharged as a first lieutenant on January 2, 1919. He enlisted in the Pennsylvania National Guard as a private in January 1926 and rose through the ranks to lieutenant colonel prior to induction into Federal service on February 17, 1941. He served four and a half years during the Second World War, during which time he was promoted to colonel, and was placed on inactive status on October 5, 1945. He was promoted to brigadier general (retired) in the Pennsylvania National Guard.

Jenkins was elected as a Republican to the Eightieth Congress (January 3, 1947–January 3, 1949), providing one of the two interruptions to the 15-term House career of Democrat Daniel Flood. Jenkins chose not to run for reelection in 1948. His single term was not a happy tenure. He was active in the House, but his major effort to site a federal anthracite research laboratory in his district grew so contentious and extended in debate with another competing representative that the House eliminated the funding. In September 1948 he told the Chamber of Commerce in Wilkes-Barre that congressional salaries were too low, terms too short, and that issue-specific telegrams and postcards to his House office went straight into the trash.

He once again served as the assistant district attorney of Luzerne County in 1949, and again in 1950. Thereafter he resumed his private law practice in Wilkes-Barre, where he died, aged 81. He was interred in Evergreen Cemetery in Shavertown, Pennsylvania.

U.S. House of Representatives
| Preceded by Daniel J. Flood | Member of the U.S. House of Representatives from Pennsylvania's 11th congressional district 1947–1949 | Succeeded by Daniel J. Flood |
