= Sisters of Nazareth =

Roman Catholic religious congregation for women

Congregation of the Sisters of Nazareth
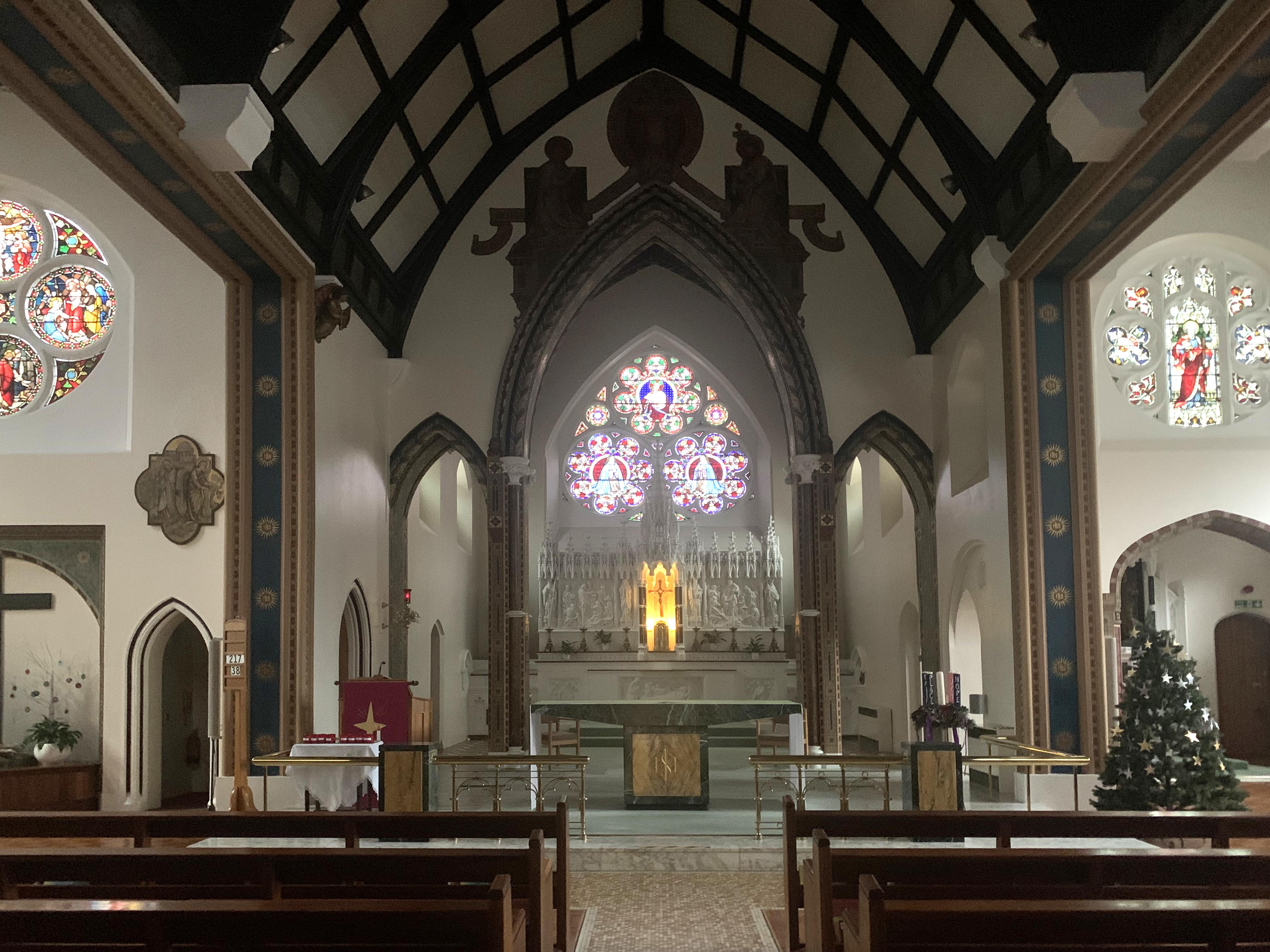
- Sisters Of Narareth Chapel, Hammersmith, London
- Abbreviation: Post-nominal letters: CSN
- Nickname: Poor Sisters of Nazareth
- Formation: 1861; 165 years ago
- Founder: Victoire Larmenier
- Founded at: Hammersmith, London
- Type: Religious Order of Pontifical Right (for Women)
- Headquarters: Nazareth House, Hammersmith Road, London, England
- Superior General: Sister Brenda McCall, CSN
- Parent organization: Roman Catholic Church
- Website: Official website
- Motto: Latin: Caritas Christi Urget Nos ('The Love of Christ Impels Us'); Ministry: education and care of the sick, poor and older people in homes

The international Congregation of the Sisters of Nazareth, until recently known as the Poor Sisters of Nazareth, are a Roman Catholic apostolic congregation of religious sisters of pontifical right, based in London, England. Members live in "Nazareth Houses" in English-speaking countries around the world: the UK, Ireland, United States, Australia, New Zealand and South Africa. They have no connection to the Sisters of Nazareth convents of Nazareth and Shefa-Amr in Israel, nor with the US-based Sisters of the Holy Family of Nazareth.

== Different congregations with identical or similar names ==
Nazareth House in Rochester, Monroe County, New York, USA is not associated with the congregation.

The Catholic order Les Religieuses de Nazareth ("Sisters of Nazareth"), based in Rome and with convents in Nazareth and Shefa-Amr in Israel, is not associated with the London-based "Sisters of Nazareth". The Sisters of the Holy Family of Nazareth, with houses in Nazareth and Haifa, is also unrelated.

== History ==
Victoire Larmenier was born on 21 July 1827 at Liffré, near Rennes, France. In 1851 she entered the Paris novitiate of the Little Sisters of the Poor, taking the name Sister Basil Marie. Shortly thereafter, she and four other sisters were sent to make a foundation in London. This was in response to a request from the London branch of the Society of St. Vincent de Paul. In keeping with the mission of the LSP they directed their service to the care of the elderly poor.

In October 1857 the Sisters built the first Nazareth House in Hammersmith. By this time, the Sisters were also caring for poor and infirm children. In 1861 Hammersmith community separated from the Little Sisters of the Poor and were recognised as a diocesan religious community under the title Poor Sisters of Nazareth in 1864. By the time of her death in June 1878, Larmenier had founded eight other Nazareth Houses in England, Scotland, Wales and Ireland.

In 1888, at the request of Bishop James Moore of Ballarat, six Irish Sisters of Nazareth left Tilbury on the S.S. Ormuz for Melbourne, Australia, where they found hospitality with the Good Shepherd Sisters before moving on to Ballarat. Sisters from Hammersmith arrived in Christchurch, New Zealand in 1905.

In 1924, Archbishop John Joseph Cantwell invited the Sisters of Nazareth to California, where they founded the first Nazareth House in the United States, in San Diego. A home for the ageing was established in September 1935.

A 1952 short film, With the Sisters of Nazareth, Kilmarnock describes daily life in the convent of the sisters and the convent school.

== Activities and mission statement ==
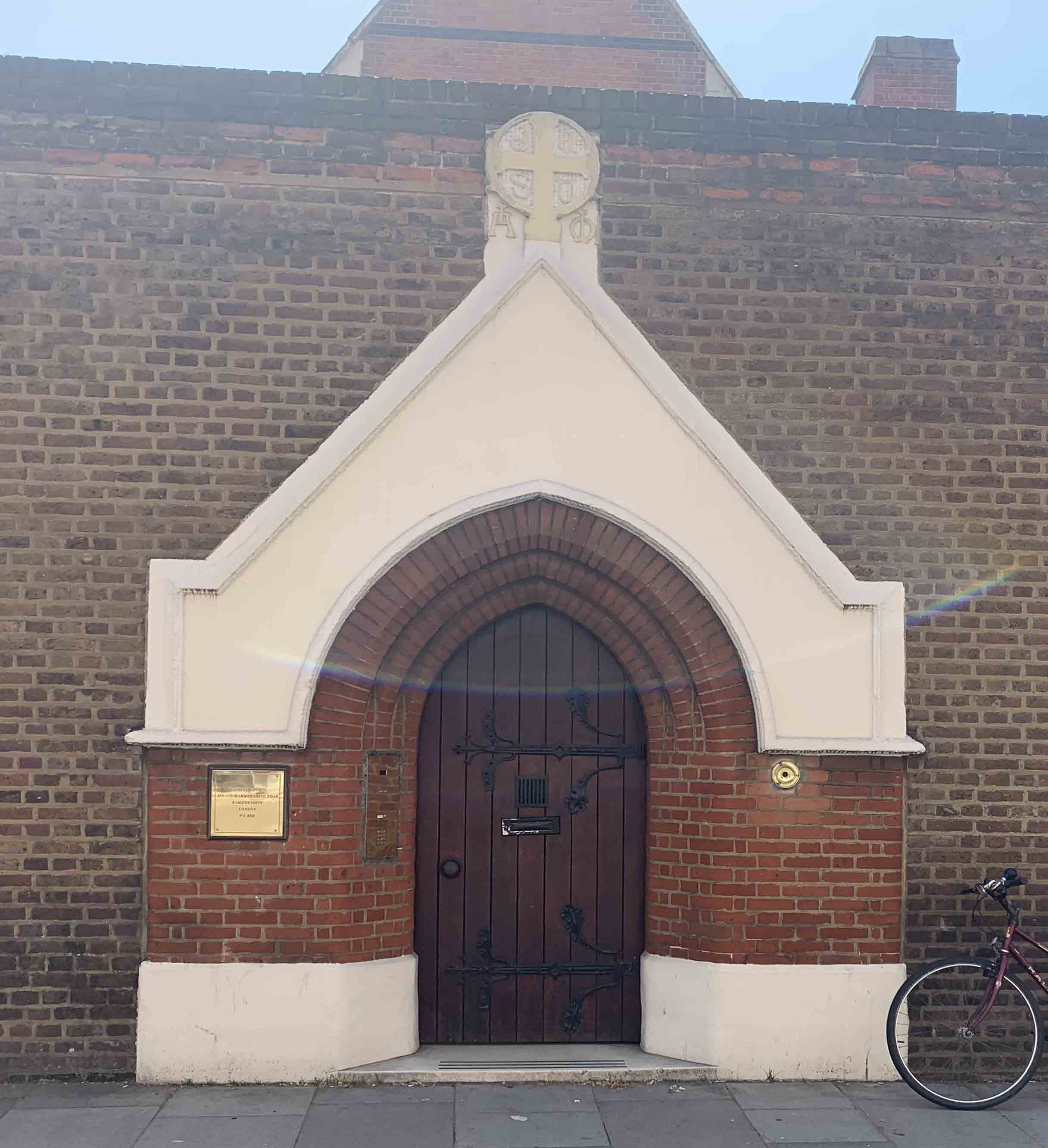
Sisters of Nazareth Front Gate, Hammersmith

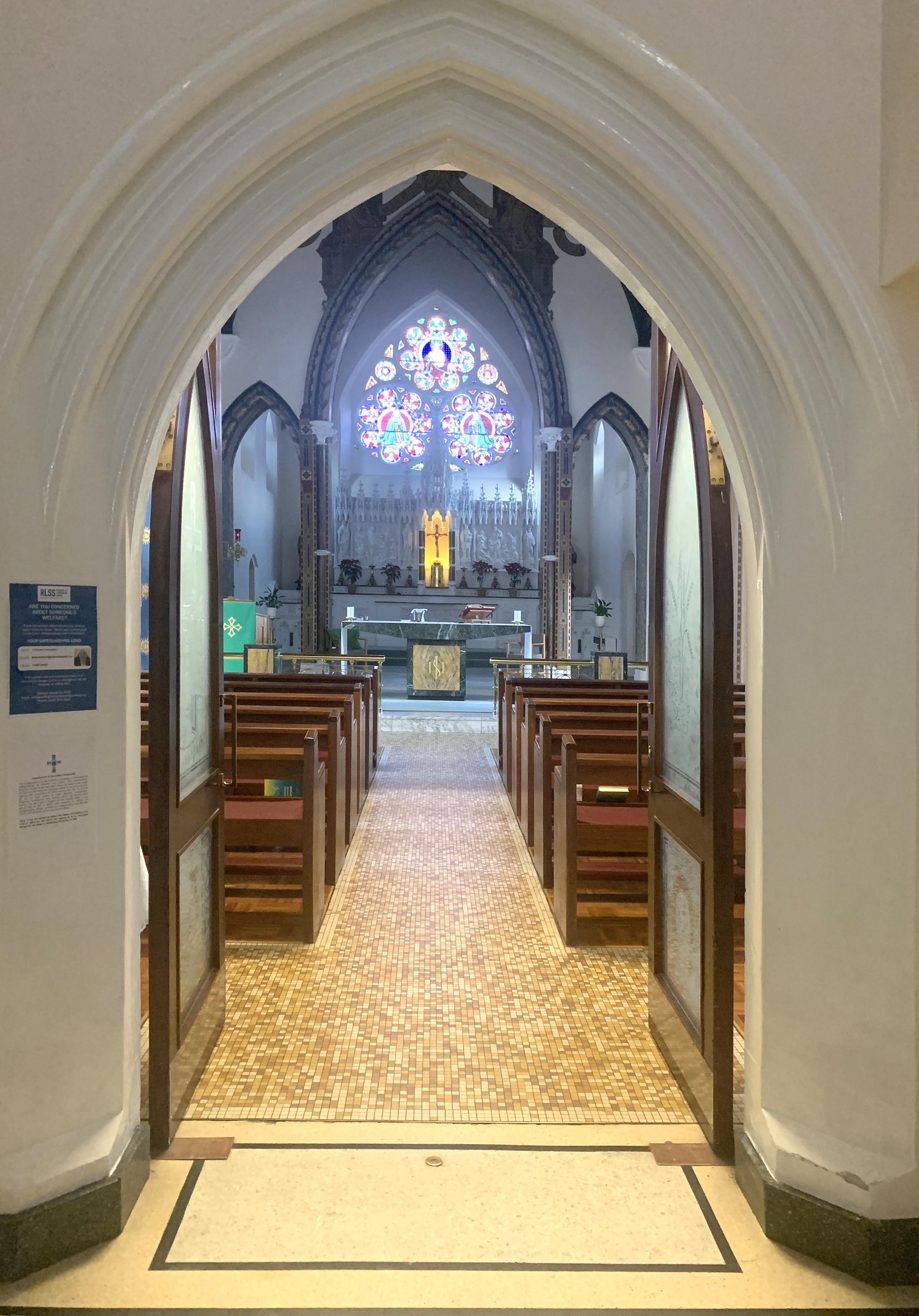
Entry to Sisters of Nazareth Chapel, Hammersmith

Their main focus in all regions is caring for older people in Homes, and activities including providing flexible support for assisted living, care for children and young people worldwide, and clinics and food programmes in South Africa.

The Motherhouse in Hammersmith remains the organization's international headquarters. As of 2013 there were 252 members worldwide. as of 2014 there were 35 Nazareth Houses in Australia, New Zealand, Ireland, South Africa, United Kingdom, United States, and Zimbabwe, operated mainly as care homes for frail older people. They also manage six schools and two day care nurseries.

By the close of the first decade of the twenty first century, the Congregation operated 15 care establishments for older people in the UK and a number of services for children. Sisters are also involved in pastoral care, hospital chaplaincy, and care home and domiciliary visits.

== Child abuse ==
Allegations of cruelty and sexual abuse were made in 1998 about Nazareth Houses in Tyne, Sunderland, Plymouth, and Manchester in England, Swansea in Wales, and Aberdeen, Glasgow, Midlothian and Kilmarnock in Scotland. A report was published on allegations of abuse and brutality at one of the order's homes in Queensland, Australia, over a 90-year period ending in 1976, including 48 children who were part of the British government Child Migrant Programme.

In the Northern Ireland Historical Institutional Abuse Inquiry, an inquiry into institutional sexual and physical abuse in Northern Ireland institutions that were in charge of children from 1922 to 1995, Module 1 investigated the Sisters of Nazareth Homes in Derry (27 January 2014 to 29 May 2014), Module 2 the Child Migrant Programme, which forcibly sent children from NI institutions including Nazareth House to Australia, where some were maltreated and exploited, and Module 4 (started on 5 January 2015) covered Sisters of Nazareth Belfast - Nazareth House and Lodge.

The senior counsel to the Inquiry criticised the nuns' "haphazard and piecemeal" evidence, but acknowledged that the information was old and not stored in a single orderly archive. Frank Cranmer, in an article published in Law and Religio, UK, questioned whether someone who had previously represented alleged victims in judicial proceedings be subsequently appointed to an inquiry investigating those and related allegations. He noted, "[A]ll the public and media sympathy was with the victims and overcame any rational assessment of the suitability of her appointment, ...should public sentiment determine suitability for such appointments?"

Allegations included nuns beating children for bed-wetting, withholding letters from children's families to them, and often separating siblings. Allegations also included sexual abuse by older children, visiting priests, employees, and in one instance a nun. A 1953 report, cited by the senior counsel, from a ministry of home affairs inspector noted, "The children in these homes have nothing like a normal upbringing. They must feel unloved as it is just not possible for the number of staff to show affection to such a large number of children... This is not meant entirely as a criticism of staff, but their task is impossible." In early 2014 the Sisters of Nazareth admitted that some children had been subjected to physical and sexual abuse in institutions in Northern Ireland that they controlled, and apologised unreservedly.

Nazareth House in Aberdeen faced similar allegations from former inmates: sexual and physical abuse, children forced to eat vomit, bedwetters made to hold soiled bedsheets over their heads and separating siblings. Archbishop Mario Conti was a regular visitor to Nazareth House in Aberdeen denied that siblings were separated. Joseph Currie, was sexually abused by a volunteer at Nazareth House in Aberdeen in 1967. In 2003 he took police, a solicitor and Nazareth house officials back to his old room, where, hidden behind a plywood panel, were notes on paper written by him 26 years earlier. Currie claimed that he reported the abuse in confession to Conti who did nothing about it.

Helen Cusiter revisited Nazareth house in 1996, and the sight of one nun, Sister Alphonso triggered a lot of traumatic memories. In particular, one incident occurred when she was playing on swings: "She took me off by the hair, twisted me round and threw me against the church wall," she says. "She broke all my front teeth, my face was a mashed mess, the other kids were all screaming." Helen Howie, a 77-year-old woman who had been raised in the orphanage and later worked there as a helper, still remembers the blood on Cusiter's face. "Sister Alphonso didn't use leather straps, she used her fists, she had some strength." Her younger brother told her he had been sexually abused at the home and later committed suicide.

A former resident remembered that a girl named Betsy Owens had drowned on a visit to Aberdeen beach while on an exchange from Nazareth House Cardonald, Glasgow in the summer of 1955. She had gone into the sea to retrieve a yellow plastic ball which had blown into the sea, and was afraid of punishment if it was lost. During the same incident another girl was dashed against a log and lifted out of the water cut and bleeding. One of the nuns said: 'You watch you don't get blood on your dress or you'll catch it.' A lawyer for Nazareth house said that nobody connected with Nazareth House remembered the incident, and there were no records of the death of a child at the time. Nazareth House said there were no records or knowledge that anyone named Betsy Owens had ever stayed at Aberdeen. One of the former residents of the Cardiff House recalled, "Holidays were spent at other Nazareth House homes. I remember we all did not want to leave the home in Brecon because the nuns there were so kind."

According to one victim of Nazareth House in Aberdeen "I didn't want money. We have tried every way to get the church to accept what happened, but they've done nothing. Nothing. These are major things, the experience was a severe danger to people's lives." She points out that "15 members of my group have taken their own lives. I am all right, I'm surviving. I don't need financial help. Money would never take away what happened - God's representatives on earth behaving in such an appalling manner." She had worried about what had happened for years. "I need answers, not just about Betsy but about the whole damned thing. I telephoned Cardinal Winning, and asked him to do something about all the things that were coming to light about Nazareth House. He said very little, I would have liked him just to say sorry. He wasn't prepared to accept that it was the truth. I felt terrible all over again."

In autumn 2000, Sister Alphonso, appearing as Marie Docherty, was convicted of four charges of cruel and unnatural treatment. Sheriff Colin Harris ordered that several other charges be rejected and said that he would only admonish, rather than imprison, her because of her age and her health. She was advised to take a holiday.

In September 2014, when the Inquiry's module 2 was examining forced child migration to Australia, Sister Brenda McCall, representing the Sisters of Nazareth, admitted that the order had sent about 111 children to Australia, and acknowledged that this was a grave injustice to the children and their families. A Sisters of Nazareth reference from 1928 stated that the scheme was also to help "spread Catholicity" in Australia. Sister Brenda said that the sisters "acted in good faith" in cooperating with the scheme and were assured by the Australian government and the Australian Catholic hierarchy that it would be good for the children.

In 2019 the Scottish Child Abuse Inquiry issued a report on the Sisters of Nazareth orphanages in Aberdeen, Cardonald, Lasswade and Kilmarnock in Scotland. They concluded that between 1933 and 1984, children who had been in the care of Sisters of Nazareth orphanages had encountered sexual abuse "of the utmost depravity.". In 2025 the Sitsers of Nazareth agreed to pay up to £5.75 Million to victims of abuse at their orphanages in Scotland.

=== Apology ===
On 11 March 2022 ministers from the five main political parties in Northern Ireland and six abusing institutions made statements of apology in the Northern Ireland Assembly.

The six institutions that apologised for carrying out abuse were De La Salle Brothers, represented by Br Francis Manning; the Sisters of Nazareth, represented by Sr Cornelia Walsh; the Sisters of St Louis represented by Sr Uainin Clarke; theGood Shepherd Sisters, represented by Sr Cait O'Leary; Barnardo's in Northern Ireland, represented by Michele Janes; and Irish Church Missions, represented by Rev Mark Jones. In live reporting after the apology, BBC News reported that Jon McCourt from Survivors North West said "If what happened today was the best that the church could offer by way of an apology they failed miserably. There was no emotion, there was no ownership. ... I don't believe that the church and institutions atoned today." He called on the intuitions to "do the right thing" and contribute to the redress fund for survivors, saying that institutions have done similar for people in Scotland. McCourt praised the government ministers' apologies; they had "sat and thought out and listened to what it was we said.", but said that the institutions had failed to do this, leading to some victims having to leave the room while they were speaking, "compound[ing] the hurt." Others angry at the institutions' apologies included Caroline Farry, who attended St Joseph's Training School in Middletown from 1978-1981, overseen by nuns from the Sisters of St Louis, Pádraigín Drinan from Survivors of Abuse, and Alice Harper, whose brother, a victim of the De La Salle Brothers, had since died. Peter Murdock, from campaign group Savia, was at Nazareth Lodge Orphanage with his brother (who had recently died); he likened the institution to an "SS camp". He said "It's shocking to hear a nun from the institution apologising ... it comes 30 years too late ... people need to realise that it has to come from the heart. They say it came from the heart but why did they not apologise 30 years ago?"

== Notable Sisters of Nazareth ==
- Mary Lucy Dosh
- Sister Anne
- Victoire Larmenier
