= James Nelligan =

American politician (1929–2026)

Jim Nelligan
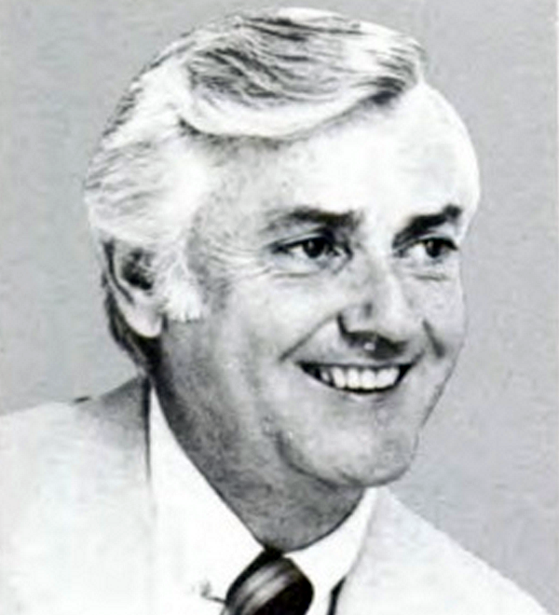

Member of the U.S. House of Representatives from Pennsylvania's 11th district
- In office January 3, 1981 – January 3, 1983
- Preceded by: Ray Musto
- Succeeded by: Frank Harrison

Personal details
- Born: James Leo Nelligan; February 14, 1929 Wilkes-Barre, Pennsylvania, U.S.
- Died: October 6, 2026 (aged 97) Spartanburg, South Carolina, U.S.
- Party: Republican
- Spouses: Patricia Brinkworth (m. 1960; div. 1968); Jean Kessler (died 2014)
- Children: 1
- Education: King's College (BS)

Military service
- Allegiance: United States
- Branch: United States Army

James Leo Nelligan (February 14, 1929 – October 6, 2026) was an American politician who served as member of the United States House of Representatives for one term representing Pennsylvania's 11th congressional district from 1981 to 1983. In 1991, he was a candidate for the Board of Commissioners of Luzerne County, Pennsylvania.

== Life and career ==
Nelligan was born in Wilkes-Barre, Pennsylvania. He attended James M. Coughlin High School, graduating in 1946, and King's College in Wilkes-Barre, graduating in 1951. He served in the United States Army, and worked as an accountant. From 1951 to 1967 he was a staff member of the United States Government Accountability Office in Washington, D.C. He also served on the staff for the United States House of Representatives Committee on Government Operations from 1967 to 1970.

He was the director of the Finance and Grants Management Division of the now-defunct Office of Economic Opportunity from 1970 to 1973, and the director of the Office of Property Management and the Office of Federal Management Policy in the General Services Administration from 1973 to 1975. He served as the operations director for the United States House of Representatives Subcommittee on Oversight and Investigations and the Committee on Interstate and Foreign Commerce from 1975 to 1979.

Nelligan was elected in 1980 as a Republican to the 97th United States Congress but was an unsuccessful candidate for reelection in 1982. After his term in Congress he became the Deputy Secretary of Revenue of the state of Pennsylvania, from 1983 to 1985.

In 1991, Nelligan ran for a seat on the Luzerne County Board of Commissioners, running on a ticket with incumbent commissioner James Phillips. While Phillips won reelection, Nelligan ultimately lost the election.

He first married Patricia Ellen Brinkworth on May 14, 1960, at St. Joseph Cathedral in Buffalo, New York. After they divorced in June 1968, he then married the former Jean K. Kessler. On February 18, 2014, Jean died from injuries sustained in a car crash that occurred on February 17, 2014.

Nelligan died in Spartanburg, South Carolina, on October 6, 2026, at the age of 97.

U.S. House of Representatives
Preceded by Raphael J. Musto	Member of the U.S. House of Representatives from Pennsylvania's 11th congressional district 1981–1983	Succeeded by Frank G. Harrison
