= King's College (Pennsylvania) =

Catholic college in Wilkes-Barre, Pennsylvania, US

- Latin: Collegium Christi Regis
- Motto: Latin: Oportet Eum Regnare
- Motto in English: "It is fitting that He should reign"
- Type: Private university
- Established: 1946; 80 years ago
- Religious affiliation: Catholic Church (Congregation of Holy Cross)
- Endowment: US$124 million
- President: Thomas Looney
- Faculty: 152 full-time, 77 part-time
- Administrative staff: 339
- Students: 1,945
- Location: Wilkes-Barre, Pennsylvania, US; 41°14′53″N 75°52′39″W
- Campus: Urban, 48 acres (19 ha)
- Colors: (Red and gold)
- Nickname: Monarchs
- Sporting affiliations: NCAA Division III, Middle Atlantic Conference
- Mascot: Leo the Lion
- Website: kings.edu
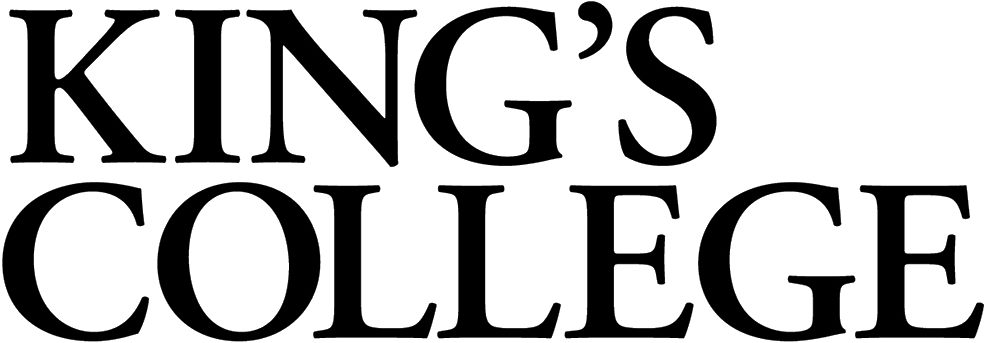

King's College is a private Catholic university in Wilkes-Barre, Pennsylvania, United States. It is run by the Congregation of Holy Cross and is accredited by the Middle States Commission on Higher Education. It is located within the Diocese of Scranton.

== History ==
King's College was founded in 1946 by Congregation of Holy Cross priests and brothers from the University of Notre Dame. The original mission of the college was to educate the sons of local miners and mill workers who lived in the Northeastern Pennsylvania region. The college's Administration Building indicates the links to the coal mining industry: Built in 1913, it was designed by Daniel Burnham of Chicago to serve as the headquarters of the Lehigh Valley Coal Company.

The institution's chapel, The Chapel of Christ the King, is located on West North Street. It features a 4,200-pound (1,900 kg) anthracite altar, highlighting the relationship between the coal industry and the institution. It was created for King's in 1954 by renowned African-American sculptor and Wilkes-Barre resident, C. Edgar Patience.

In June 1972, massive flooding occurred in downtown Wilkes-Barre. Rains from Tropical Storm Agnes caused the neighboring Susquehanna River to overflow and flood most of the campus.

=== Presidents ===
	President	Term
1	James W. Connerton	1946–1949
2	John J. Lane	1949–1950
3	Leo F. Flood	1950–1955
4	George P. Benaglia	1955–1964
5	Lane D. Kilburn	1964–1974
6	Charles D. Sherrer	1974–1981
7	James Lackenmier	1981–1999
8	Thomas J. O'Hara	1999–2011
9	John J. Ryan	2011–2021
10	Thomas Looney	2021–present

== Campus ==
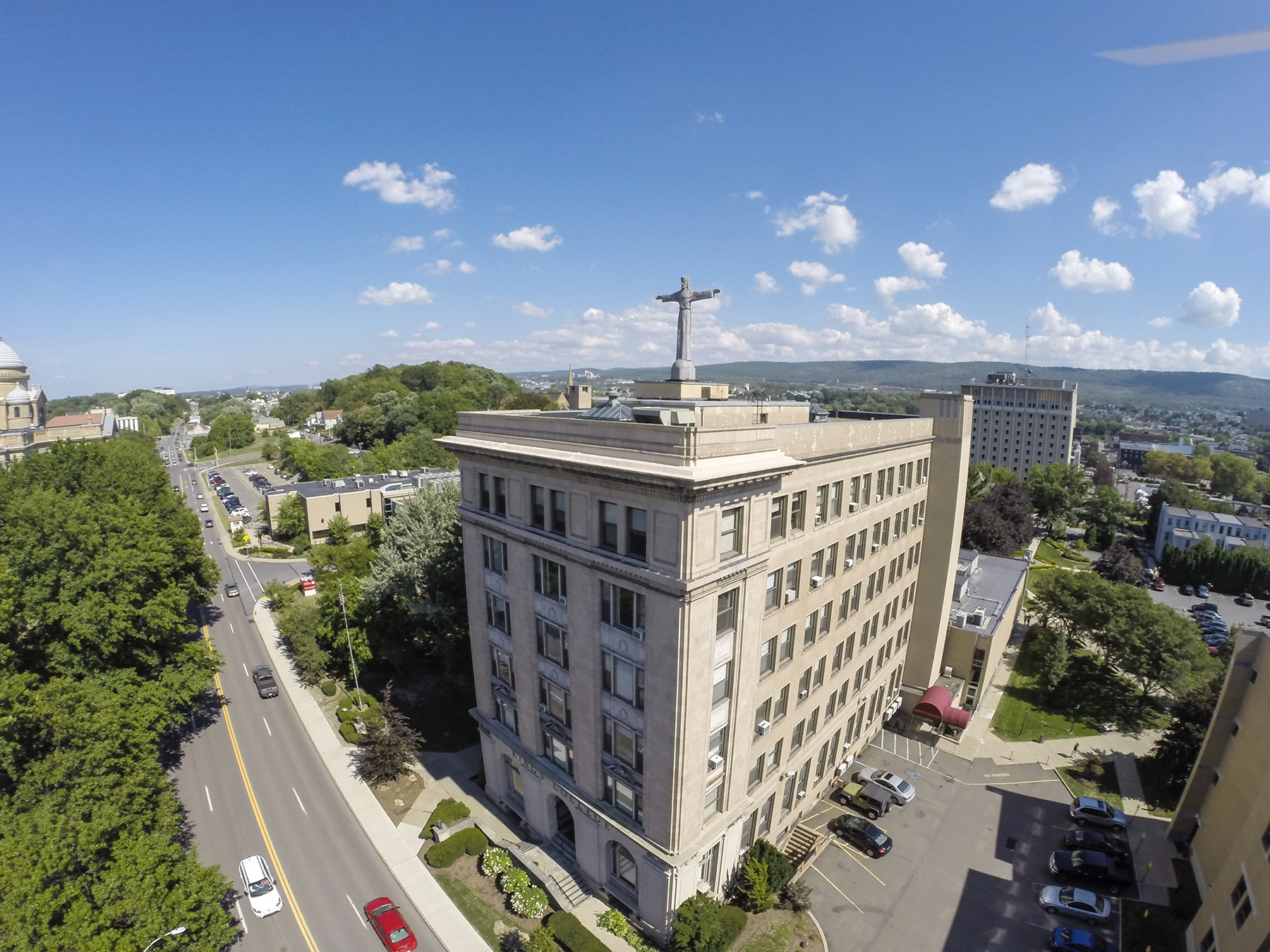
Administration Building, King's College

The campus covers nearly 50 acres in downtown Wilkes-Barre (adjacent to the Susquehanna River). Situated at the center of the campus, Monarch Court is the site of many campus community activities. The court includes a brick-paved area that encompasses a large King's Block K, also in brick, at its center. Each of the bricks surrounding the K is engraved with the names of students, alumni, and local businesses.

The Richard Abbas Alley Center for Health Sciences is home to academics programs such as Physician Assistant Studies, Athletic Training, and Exercise Science. It also includes student residences, an art and cultural display center, and a Chick-fil-A restaurant.

Many of King's athletic teams train and compete two miles from campus at the Robert L. Betzler Athletic Complex, a 33.5-acre athletic facility that includes McCarthy Stadium, a field house, and fields for baseball, softball, men's and women's soccer, football, and field hockey.

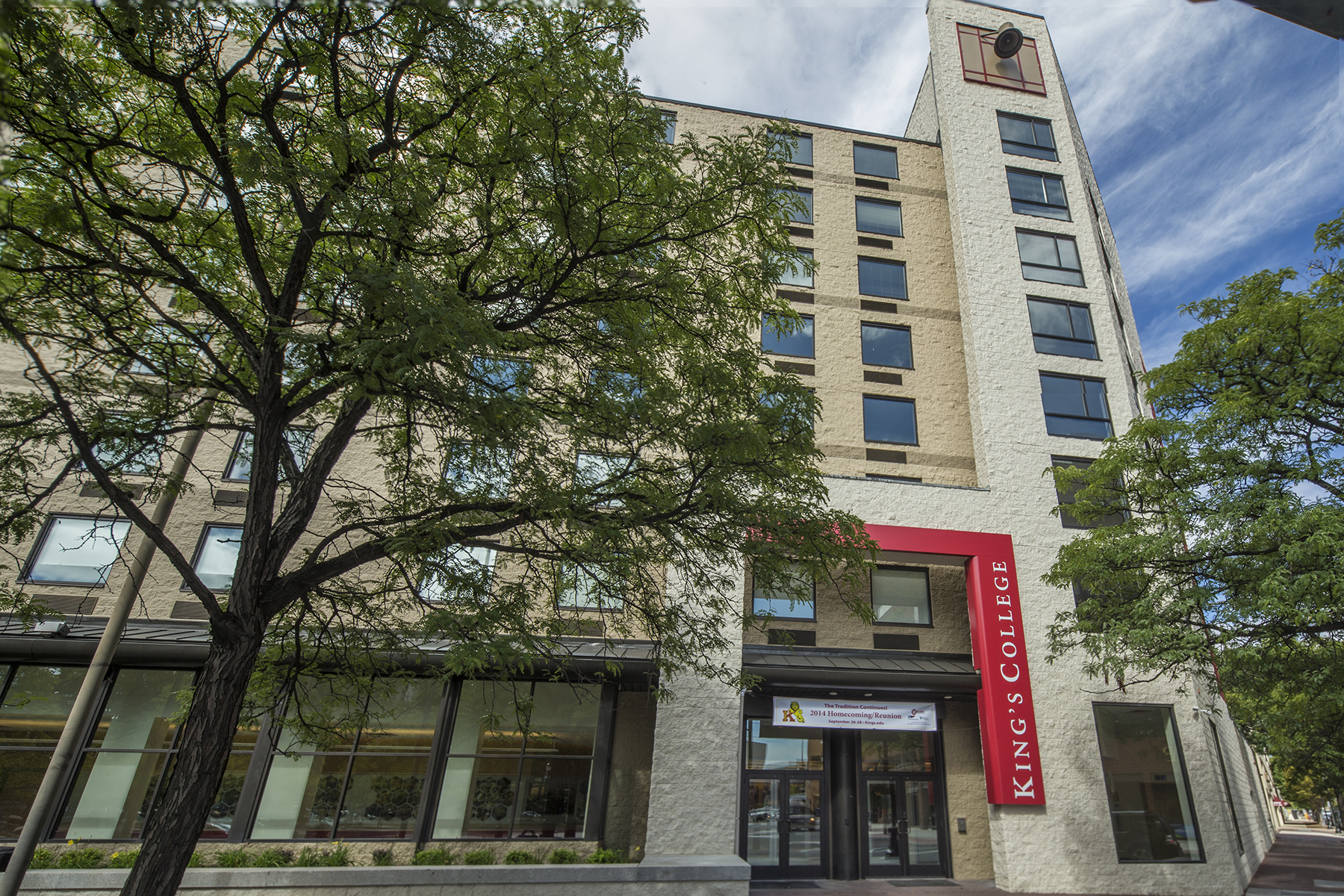
Richard Abbas Alley Center for Health Sciences, King's College

== Academics ==
King's College is accredited by the Middle States Commission on Higher Education with specific programs accredited by the Association to Advance Collegiate Schools of Business, Council for the Accreditation of Educator Preparation, Commission of Accreditation of Healthcare Management Education, Accreditation Review Commission on Education for Physician Assistants, and the Commission on Accreditation of Athletic Training Education.

King's grants bachelor's degrees, a Master of Science (M.S.) degree, a Master of Education (MEd) degree, and a five-year physician assistant studies program leading to a master's degree.

== Student life ==
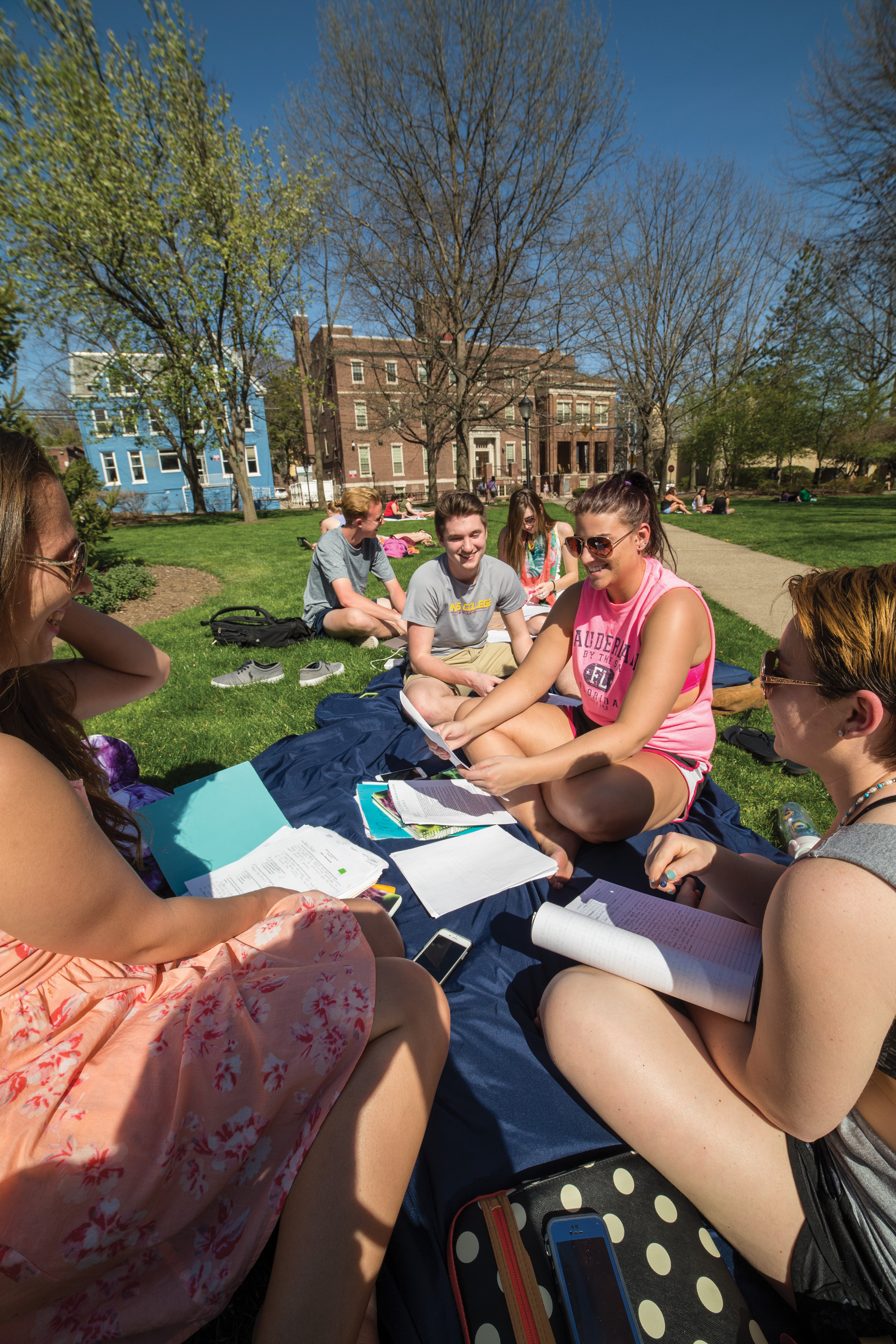
O'Connor Park at King's College in 2016

King's College has more than fifty student organizations. King's 28 NCAA Division III teams include men's baseball, basketball, football, ice hockey, golf, lacrosse, soccer, swimming, tennis, track and field, and wrestling. Women's sports include basketball, field hockey, ice hockey, lacrosse, soccer, softball, swimming, tennis, track & field, and volleyball. It also offers rugby and cheerleading as club sports. Intramural sports include basketball, flag football, indoor soccer, racquetball, and dodgeball.

Other co-curricular activities include academic clubs in almost every department: the King's Players (theater), Cantores Christi Regis (choir), Campus Ministry, The Crown (student newspaper), the Regis (yearbook), and The Scop (literary magazine).

The institution offers traditional dormitory housing and apartments. Traditional student housing options include Esseff Hall (female freshmen only), Holy Cross Hall (male freshmen only), and Luksic Hall (a co-ed residence hall). Apartments include Ryan Hall (a four-story co-ed building), Flood Hall (co-ed), and O'Hara Hall (a three-story co-ed).

== Extracurricular activities ==
=== Clubs and organizations ===
King's College recognizes over 46 clubs and organizations. These clubs focus on academics (Biology Club and Psychology Club), service (Knights of Columbus, and Sigma Kappa Sigma), health related organizations (Sports Medicine Society), arts and sciences, international (Multicultural/International Club), media and publishing (Media Club), music and arts (Campion Society and Kings Players), and special interests.

=== Media and publications ===
The King's College student-run radio station, WRKC ("Radio King's College") focuses on music but also covers live athletic events and sponsors a news program. It also sponsors The Crown, a weekly student newspaper. King's literary magazine, The Scop, is published twice every year and accepts written and visual submissions from current students and alumni.

The institution has a closed-circuit campus television station, KCTV 10, which broadcasts shows such as a talk show ("King's Live"), a music competition ("King's Idol"), news, and sports.

== Athletics ==
King's athletics wordmark

King's College athletics teams are nicknamed the Monarchs. The university competes in the MAC Freedom Conference of NCAA Division III.

King's teams include men's baseball, basketball, football, ice hockey, golf, lacrosse, soccer, swimming, tennis, track & field, and wrestling. Women's NCAA sports include basketball, field hockey, ice hockey, lacrosse, soccer, softball, swimming, tennis, track & field, and volleyball.

It also offers rugby and cheerleading as club sports. Intramural sports include basketball, flag football, indoor soccer, racquetball, and dodgeball.

== Academia ==
- Francis T. McAndrew, social psychologist, professor, & science writer
- Thomas J. O'Hara, Provincial of the U.S. Province of Priests and Brothers of the Congregation of Holy Cross; College Professor; former president of King's College

== Arts and Entertainment ==
- Banana Joe (Joseph Montione), radio personality
- Donora Hillard, author
- Santo Loquasto, Tony Award winning Broadway set and costume designer

== Business & Law ==
- Mark Ciavarella, disgraced judge in kids for cash scandal
- Joseph James Farnan, Jr., United States federal judge
- Edward F. Kearney, Founder and CEO of Kearney & Company
- William G. McGowan, former MCI Communications chairman (Known for breaking up the Bell Telephone Company monopoly)
- Patrick J. O'Connor, lawyer, vice chairman of Cozen O'Connor in Philadelphia

== Government & Politics ==
- Frank G. Harrison, former United States Congressman
- Thomas M. Leighton, former Wilkes-Barre mayor
- Patrick J. Murphy, Under Secretary of the Army and Chief Management Officer (CMO); former United States Congressman
- James L. Nelligan, former United States Congressman (later donated records to college as part of the Dan Flood/James Nelligan Archives)
- Paul F. Nichols, former member of the Virginia House of Delegates
- Edward Staback, former Pennsylvania State Representative
- Thomas Tigue, former Pennsylvania State Representative

== Sports ==
- Pat Kennedy, former head basketball coach at several NCAA Division I programs, including Florida State University and DePaul University
- Bob MacKinnon Jr., basketball coach
