= 1980 United States House of Representatives elections =

House elections for the 97th U.S. Congress

- November 4, 1980

All 435 seats in the United States House of Representatives 218 seats needed for a majority
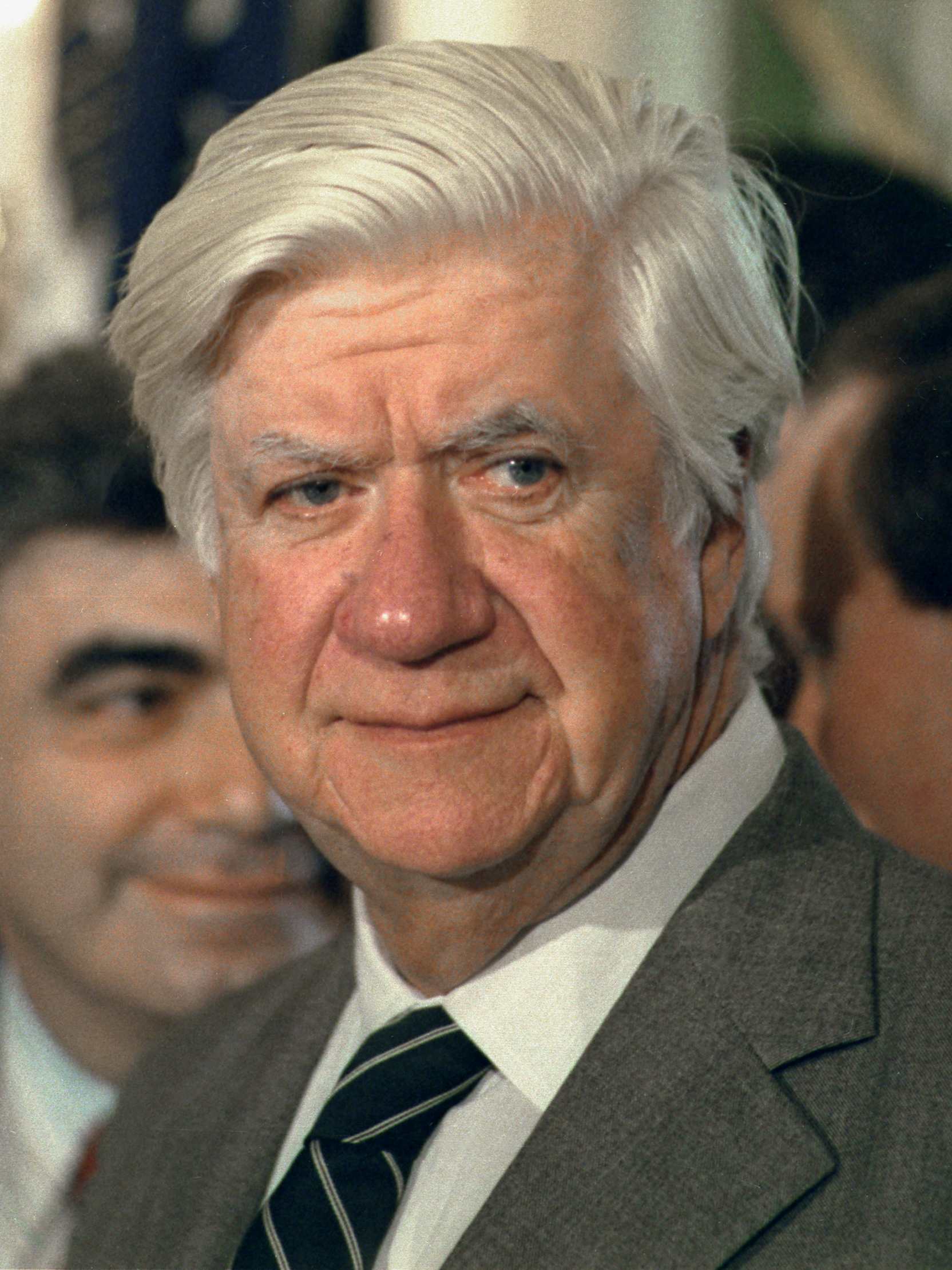

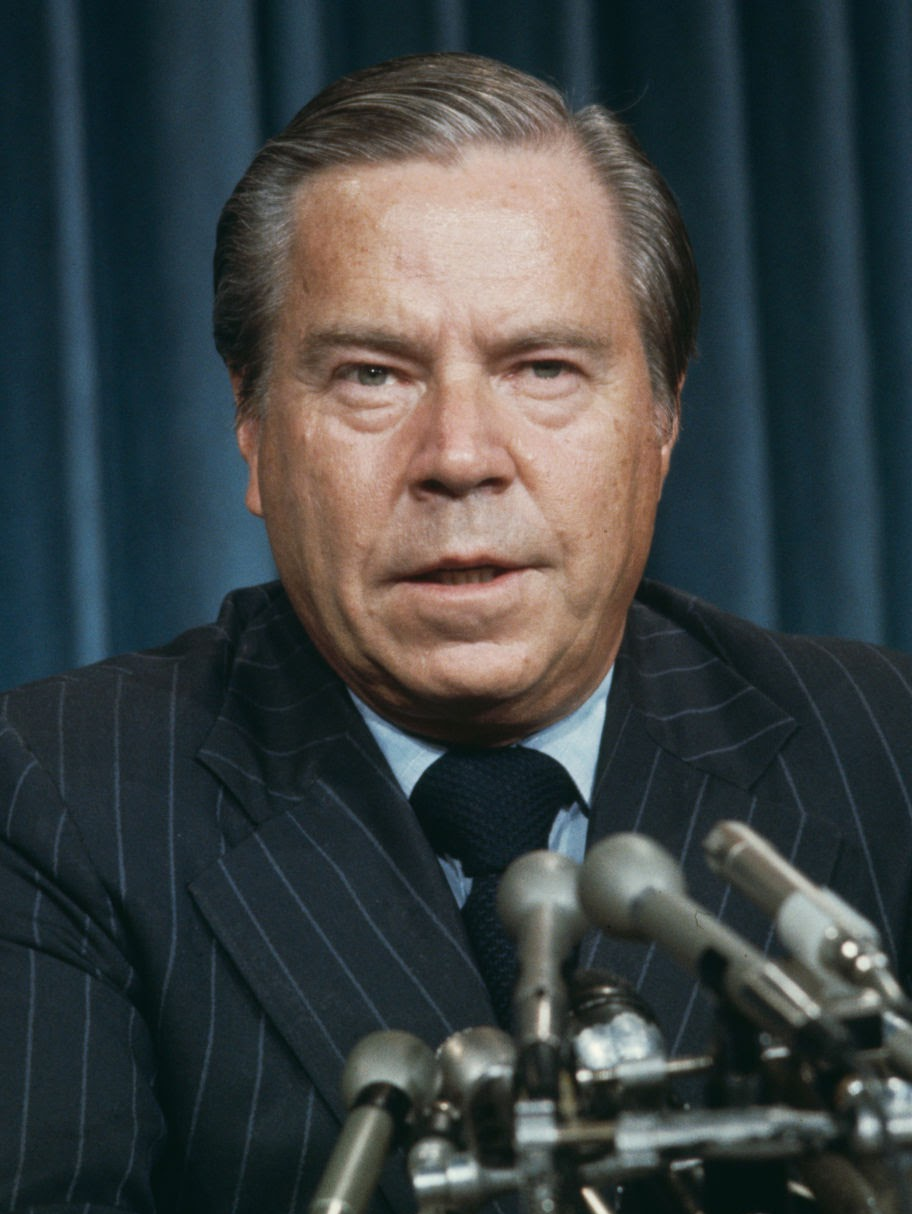
	Majority party	Minority party
Leader	Tip O'Neill	John Rhodes (retired as leader)
Party	Democratic	Republican
Leader since	January 4, 1977	December 7, 1973
Leader's seat	Massachusetts 8th	Arizona 1st
Last election	277 seats	157 seats
Seats won	242	191
Seat change	▼35	▲34
Popular vote	39,347,947	37,222,588
Percentage	50.5%	47.8%
Swing	▼3.2pp	▲3.0pp
	Third party	Fourth party
Party	Conservative	Independent
Last election	1	0
Seats won	1	1 (Note: Thomas M. Foglietta was elected in Pennsylvania 1 as an independent but immediately thereafter became a Democrat.)
Seat change	Steady	▲1
Popular vote	136,967	216,403
Percentage	0.1%	0.1%
Swing	▲0.1pp	▲0.1pp
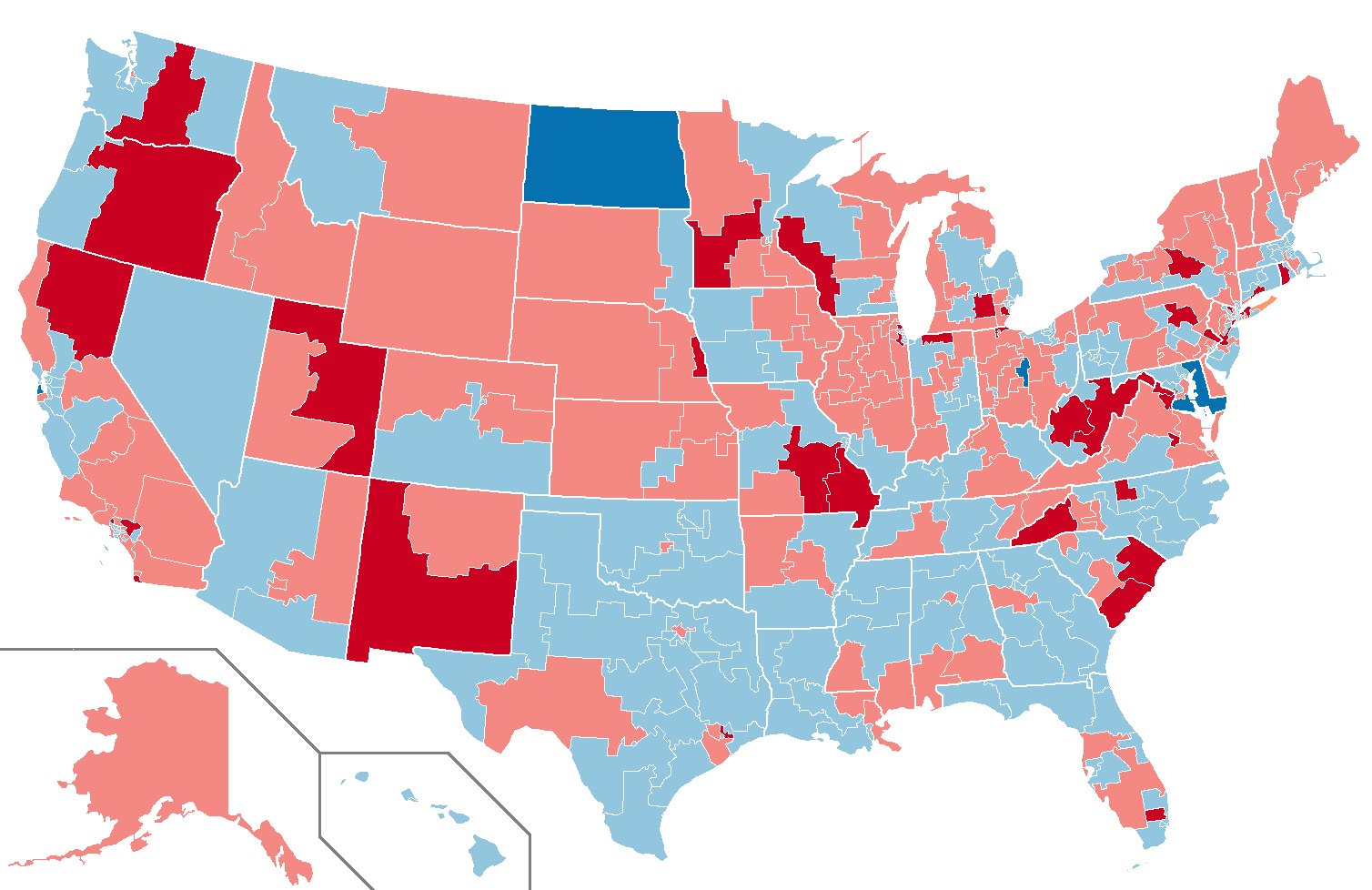
- Results: Democratic hold Democratic gain Republican hold Republican gain Conservative hold
Speaker before election
Tip O'Neill
Democratic
Elected Speaker
Tip O'Neill
Democratic

The 1980 United States House of Representatives elections was an election for the United States House of Representatives on November 4, 1980, to elect members to serve in the 97th United States Congress. They coincided with the election of Ronald Reagan as president, defeating Democratic incumbent Jimmy Carter. Reagan's victory also allowed many Republican House candidates to secure elections. The Republicans gained a net of 35 seats from the Democratic Party. The Democrats nonetheless retained a significant majority, unlike the Senate elections, where Republicans gained control of the chamber. However, many Democratic congressmen from the South (known as "Boll weevils") frequently took conservative stances on issues, allowing Republicans to have a working ideological majority for some of President Reagan's proposals during his first two years in office.

This election marked the first time since Reconstruction that Republicans won a sizable majority of Representatives from a Deep South state (South Carolina). It was also the first time that the new Libertarian Party received the third-largest share of the popular vote in both chambers of Congress. As of 2024, this is the last time that Republicans won a majority of seats in the Minnesota delegation. This is the earliest House election with currently serving members, those being Chris Smith and Hal Rogers.

== Overall results ==
398 incumbent members sought reelection, but 6 were defeated in primaries and 31 defeated in the general election for a total of 358 incumbents winning.

Summary of the November 4, 1980, United States House of Representatives election results

↓
242	1	1	191
Democratic	I	C	Republican

Parties	Seats				Popular vote		
Parties	1978	1980	+/-	Strength	Vote	%	Change
Democratic Party	277	242	▼35	55.9%	39,347,947	50.5%	▼3.2%
Republican Party	157	191	▲34	43.9%	37,222,588	47.8%	▲3.0%
Libertarian Party	0	0	Steady	0.0%	568,131	0.7%	▲0.6%
Independent	0	1	▲1	0.0%	216,403	0.3%	▼0.3%
Conservative Party	1	1	Steady	0.2%	136,967	0.1%	▲0.1%
Citizens Party	0	0	Steady	0.0%	60,390	0.1%	▲0.1%
Right to Life Party	0	0	Steady	0.0%	54,142	0.1%	▲0.1%
Peace and Freedom Party	0	0	Steady	0.0%	45,281	0.1%	Steady
Others	0	0	Steady	0.0%	222,068	0.3%	▲0.3%
Total	435	435	0	100.0%	77,873,917	100.0%	-

Source: Election Statistics - Office of the Clerk

Popular vote
Democratic	50.53%
Republican	47.80%
Libertarian	0.73%
Conservative	0.18%
Others	0.76%

House seats
Democratic	55.86%
Republican	43.91%
Conservative	0.23%

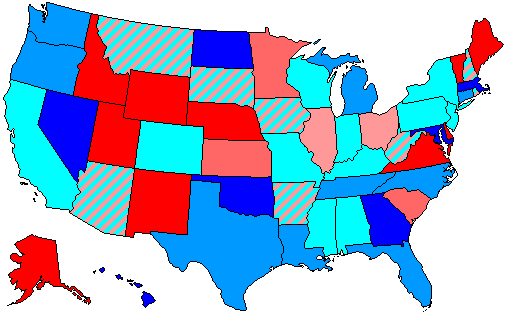
House seats by party holding plurality in state: 80+% to 100% Democratic / 80+% to 100% Republican; 60+% to 80% Democratic / 60+% to 80% Republican; Up to 60% Democratic / Up to 60% Republican; Striped = 50/50 split

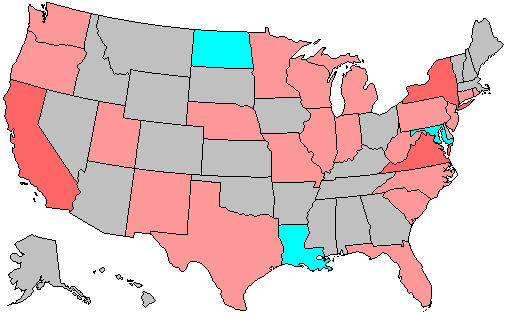
Change in seats: / 3-5 Republican gain; 1-2 Democratic gain / 1-2 Republican gain; no net change

== Special elections ==
In these special elections, the winner was seated during 1980 or before January 3, 1981; ordered by election date.

District	Incumbent			Results	Candidates
District	Member	Party	First elected	Results	Candidates
Illinois 10	Abner Mikva	Democratic	1968; 1972 (lost); 1974	Incumbent resigned September 26, 1979, to become Judge of the U.S. Court of Appeals. New member elected January 22, 1980. Republican gain. Winner was subsequently re-elected in November; see below.	▌ ✓ John Porter (Republican) 54.5%; ▌Robert Weinberger (Democratic) 45.5%
Pennsylvania 11	Dan Flood	Democratic	1944; 1946 (lost); 1948; 1952 (lost); 1954	Incumbent resigned January 31, 1980, after being censured by the U.S. House. New member elected April 9, 1980. Democratic hold. Winner subsequently lost re-election in November; see below.	▌ ✓ Ray Musto (Democratic) 27.3%; ▌James Nelligan (Republican) 23.4%; ▌Frank Harrison (Independent) 17.4%; ▌Paul Kanjorski (Independent) 15.5%; ▌Edward Mitchell (Independent) 10.2%; ▌Richard P. Adams (Independent) 4.4%; ▌Robert P. Hudock (Good Government) 1.7%
Louisiana 3	Dave Treen	Republican	1972	Incumbent resigned March 10, 1980, to become Governor of Louisiana. New member elected May 17, 1980. Democratic gain. Winner was subsequently re-elected in November; see below.	▌ ✓ Billy Tauzin (Democratic) 53.1%; ▌Jim Donelon (Republican) 46.9%
West Virginia 3	John Slack	Democratic	1958	Incumbent died March 17, 1980. New Member elected June 3, 1980. Democratic hold. Winner subsequently lost re-election in November; see below.	▌ ✓ John G. Hutchinson (Democratic) 53.8%; ▌Mick Staton (Republican) 46.2%
Michigan 13	Charles Diggs	Democratic	1954	Incumbent resigned June 3, 1980, after being censured by the U.S. House. New member elected November 4, 1980. Democratic hold. Winner also elected to the next term; see below.	▌ ✓ George Crockett Jr. (Democratic) 91.9%; ▌Ted Wallace (Republican) 8.10%

== Alabama ==
District	Incumbent			Results	Candidates
District	Member	Party	First elected	Results	Candidates
Alabama 1	Jack Edwards	Republican	1964	Incumbent re-elected.	▌ ✓ Jack Edwards (Republican) 94.8%; ▌Steve Smith (Libertarian) 5.2%
Alabama 2	William L. Dickinson	Republican	1964	Incumbent re-elected.	▌ ✓ William L. Dickinson (Republican) 60.6%; ▌Cecil Wyatt (Democratic) 36.7%; ▌Adam Hand (Libertarian) 2.4%; ▌Jerome Couch (Statesman) 0.4%
Alabama 3	Bill Nichols	Democratic	1966	Incumbent re-elected.	▌ ✓ Bill Nichols (Democratic); Uncontested
Alabama 4	Tom Bevill	Democratic	1966	Incumbent re-elected.	▌ ✓ Tom Bevill (Democratic) 97.9%; ▌A. J. Killingsworth (Statesman) 2.1%
Alabama 5	Ronnie Flippo	Democratic	1976	Incumbent re-elected.	▌ ✓ Ronnie Flippo (Democratic) 94.1%; ▌Betty T. Benson (Libertarian) 5.9%
Alabama 6	John Hall Buchanan Jr.	Republican	1964	Incumbent lost renomination. Republican hold.	▌ ✓ Albert L. Smith Jr. (Republican) 50.5%; ▌Pete Clifford (Democratic) 46.6%; ▌Richard H. Jacobson (Libertarian) 1.7%; ▌Philip Lenud (Nat Dem) 0.9%; ▌Charles C. Robey (Statesman) 0.2%
Alabama 7	Richard Shelby	Democratic	1978	Incumbent re-elected.	▌ ✓ Richard Shelby (Democratic) 72.6%; ▌James E. Bacon (Republican) 25.7%; ▌Joe Walker (Libertarian) 1.3%; ▌Mary Owensby (Statesman) 0.5%

== Alaska ==
District	Incumbent			Results	Candidates
District	Member	Party	First elected	Results	Candidates
Alaska at-large	Don Young	Republican	1973 (special)	Incumbent re-elected.	▌ ✓ Don Young (Republican) 74.1%; ▌Pat Parnell (Democratic) 25.9%

== American Samoa ==
See Non-voting delegates, below.

== Arizona ==
District	Incumbent			Results	Candidates
District	Member	Party	First elected	Results	Candidates
Arizona 1	John Jacob Rhodes	Republican	1952	Incumbent re-elected.	▌ ✓ John Jacob Rhodes (Republican) 73.3%; ▌Steve Jancek (Democratic) 21.4%; ▌Irene Leitch (Libertarian) 4.2%; ▌Rob Roper (Socialist Workers) 1.1%
Arizona 2	Mo Udall	Democratic	1961 (special)	Incumbent re-elected.	▌ ✓ Mo Udall (Democratic) 58.1%; ▌Richard H. Huff (Republican) 40.4%; ▌William Stefanov (Libertarian) 1.5%
Arizona 3	Bob Stump	Democratic	1976	Incumbent re-elected.	▌ ✓ Bob Stump (Democratic) 64.3%; ▌Bob Croft (Republican) 30.0%; ▌Sharon Hayse (Libertarian) 5.7%
Arizona 4	Eldon Rudd	Republican	1976	Incumbent re-elected.	▌ ✓ Eldon Rudd (Republican) 62.6%; ▌Les Miller (Democratic) 37.4%

== Arkansas ==
District	Incumbent			Results	Candidates
District	Member	Party	First elected	Results	Candidates
Arkansas 1	Bill Alexander	Democratic	1968	Incumbent re-elected.	▌ ✓ Bill Alexander (Democratic); Uncontested
Arkansas 2	Ed Bethune	Republican	1978	Incumbent re-elected.	▌ ✓ Ed Bethune (Republican) 79.0%; ▌Jim Reid (Democratic) 21.0%
Arkansas 3	John Paul Hammerschmidt	Republican	1966	Incumbent re-elected.	▌ ✓ John Paul Hammerschmidt (Republican); Uncontested
Arkansas 4	Beryl Anthony Jr.	Democratic	1978	Incumbent re-elected.	▌ ✓ Beryl Anthony Jr. (Democratic); Uncontested

== California ==
District	Incumbent			Results	Candidates
District	Member	Party	First elected	Results	Candidates
California 1	Harold T. Johnson	Democratic	1958	Incumbent lost re-election. Republican gain.	▌ ✓ Eugene A. Chappie (Republican) 53.7%; ▌Harold T. Johnson (Democratic) 39.9%; ▌Jim McClarin (Libertarian) 6.4%
California 2	Donald H. Clausen	Republican	1963 (special)	Incumbent re-elected.	▌ ✓ Donald H. Clausen (Republican) 54.2%; ▌Norma K. Bork (Democratic) 42.0%; ▌Daniel Mosier (Libertarian) 2.6%; ▌Linda D. Wren (Peace and Freedom) 1.3%
California 3	Bob Matsui	Democratic	1978	Incumbent re-elected.	▌ ✓ Bob Matsui (Democratic) 70.6%; ▌Joseph Murphy (Republican) 26.5%; ▌Bruce A. Daniel (Libertarian) 2.9%
California 4	Vic Fazio	Democratic	1978	Incumbent re-elected.	▌ ✓ Vic Fazio (Democratic) 65.3%; ▌Albert Dehr (Republican) 29.7%; ▌Robert J. Burnside (Libertarian) 5.0%
California 5	John L. Burton	Democratic	1974	Incumbent re-elected.	▌ ✓ John L. Burton (Democratic) 51.1%; ▌Dennis McQuaid (Republican) 45.3%; ▌Dan P. Dougherty (Libertarian) 3.6%
California 6	Phillip Burton	Democratic	1964	Incumbent re-elected.	▌ ✓ Phillip Burton (Democratic) 69.4%; ▌Tom Spinosa (Republican) 25.6%; ▌Roy Childs (Libertarian) 5.0%
California 7	George Miller	Democratic	1974	Incumbent re-elected.	▌ ✓ George Miller (Democratic) 63.3%; ▌Giles St. Clair (Republican) 31.4%; ▌Steve Snow (Libertarian) 3.1%; ▌Thomas J. Thompson (American Independent) 2.2%
California 8	Ron Dellums	Democratic	1970	Incumbent re-elected.	▌ ✓ Ron Dellums (Democratic) 55.5%; ▌Charles V. Hughes (Republican) 39.2%; ▌Tod Mikuriya (Libertarian) 5.4%
California 9	Pete Stark	Democratic	1972	Incumbent re-elected.	▌ ✓ Pete Stark (Democratic) 55.3%; ▌Bill Kennedy (Republican) 41.1%; ▌Steven W. Clanin (Libertarian) 3.6%
California 10	Don Edwards	Democratic	1962	Incumbent re-elected.	▌ ✓ Don Edwards (Democratic) 62.1%; ▌John M. Lutton (Republican) 27.9%; ▌Joseph Fuhrig (Libertarian) 7.2%; ▌Edmon V. Kaiser (American Independent) 2.7%
California 11	William Royer	Republican	1979 (special)	Incumbent lost re-election. Democratic gain.	▌ ✓ Tom Lantos (Democratic) 46.4%; ▌William Royer (Republican) 43.3%; ▌Wilson Branch (Peace and Freedom) 7.4%; ▌William S. Wade Jr. (Libertarian) 2.1%; ▌Nicholas W. Kudrovzeff (American Independent) 0.8%
California 12	Pete McCloskey	Republican	1967 (special)	Incumbent re-elected.	▌ ✓ Pete McCloskey (Republican) 72.2%; ▌Kirsten Olsen (Democratic) 18.6%; ▌Bill Evers (Libertarian) 7.6%; ▌Adele Fumino (Peace and Freedom) 1.6%
California 13	Norman Mineta	Democratic	1974	Incumbent re-elected.	▌ ✓ Norman Mineta (Democratic) 58.9%; ▌Ted Gagne (Republican) 35.5%; ▌Ray Strong (Libertarian) 3.9%; ▌Robert Goldsborough III (Peace and Freedom) 1.7%
California 14	Norman D. Shumway	Republican	1978	Incumbent re-elected.	▌ ✓ Norman D. Shumway (Republican) 60.7%; ▌Ann Cerney (Democratic) 36.2%; ▌Douglas G. Housley (Libertarian) 3.0%
California 15	Tony Coelho	Democratic	1978	Incumbent re-elected.	▌ ✓ Tony Coelho (Democratic) 71.8%; ▌Ron Schwartz (Republican) 25.2%; ▌Michael L. Pullen (Libertarian) 3.0%
California 16	Leon Panetta	Democratic	1976	Incumbent re-elected.	▌ ✓ Leon Panetta (Democratic) 71.0%; ▌Jack Roth (Republican) 24.5%; ▌Kenton H. Bowers (Libertarian) 3.0%; ▌D. Jeff Mauro (American Independent) 1.4%
California 17	Chip Pashayan	Republican	1978	Incumbent re-elected.	▌ ✓ Chip Pashayan (Republican) 70.6%; ▌Bill Johnson (Democratic) 29.4%
California 18	Bill Thomas	Republican	1978	Incumbent re-elected.	▌ ✓ Bill Thomas (Republican) 71.0%; ▌Pat Timmermans (Democratic) 29.0%
California 19	Bob Lagomarsino	Republican	1974	Incumbent re-elected.	▌ ✓ Bob Lagomarsino (Republican) 77.7%; ▌Carmen Lodise (Democratic) 17.6%; ▌Jim Trotter (Libertarian) 4.7%
California 20	Barry Goldwater Jr.	Republican	1969 (special)	Incumbent re-elected.	▌ ✓ Barry Goldwater Jr. (Republican) 78.8%; ▌Matt Miller (Democratic) 17.0%; ▌Christopher R. Darwin (Libertarian) 4.2%
California 21	James C. Corman	Democratic	1960	Incumbent lost re-election. Republican gain.	▌ ✓ Bobbi Fiedler (Republican) 48.7%; ▌James C. Corman (Democratic) 48.2%; ▌George J. Lehmann (Libertarian) 1.8%; ▌Jan B. Tucker (Peace and Freedom) 1.3%
California 22	Carlos Moorhead	Republican	1972	Incumbent re-elected.	▌ ✓ Carlos Moorhead (Republican) 63.9%; ▌Pierce O'Donnell (Democratic) 31.9%; ▌William V. Susel (Libertarian) 4.3%
California 23	Anthony Beilenson	Democratic	1976	Incumbent re-elected.	▌ ✓ Anthony Beilenson (Democratic) 63.2%; ▌Bob Winckler (Republican) 31.5%; ▌Jeffrey P. Lieb (Libertarian) 5.3%
California 24	Henry Waxman	Democratic	1974	Incumbent re-elected.	▌ ✓ Henry Waxman (Democratic) 63.8%; ▌Roland Cayard (Republican) 27.1%; ▌Maggie Feigin (Peace and Freedom) 4.0%; ▌Robert E. Lehman (Libertarian) 3.5%; ▌Jack Smilowitz (American Independent) 1.6%
California 25	Edward R. Roybal	Democratic	1962	Incumbent re-elected.	▌ ✓ Edward R. Roybal (Democratic) 66.0%; ▌Richard E. Ferraro Jr. (Republican) 28.4%; ▌William D. Mitchell (Libertarian) 5.6%
California 26	John H. Rousselot	Republican	1960; 1962 (defeated); 1970 (special)	Incumbent re-elected.	▌ ✓ John H. Rousselot (Republican) 70.9%; ▌Joseph Louis Lisoni (Democratic) 24.4%; ▌B. J. Wagener (Libertarian) 4.7%
California 27	Bob Dornan	Republican	1976	Incumbent re-elected.	▌ ✓ Bob Dornan (Republican) 51.0%; ▌Carey Peck (Democratic) 46.5%; ▌Jerry Sievers (Libertarian) 2.5%
California 28	Julian Dixon	Democratic	1978	Incumbent re-elected.	▌ ✓ Julian Dixon (Democratic) 79.2%; ▌Robert Reid (Republican) 16.9%; ▌Ernst F. Ghermann (Libertarian) 3.9%
California 29	Augustus Hawkins	Democratic	1962	Incumbent re-elected.	▌ ✓ Augustus Hawkins (Democratic) 86.1%; ▌Michael Arthur Hirt (Republican) 11.1%; ▌Earl Smith (Libertarian) 2.8%
California 30	George E. Danielson	Democratic	1970	Incumbent re-elected.	▌ ✓ George E. Danielson (Democratic) 72.1%; ▌Art Platten (Republican) 23.5%; ▌Bruce M. Hobbs (Libertarian) 4.4%
California 31	Charles H. Wilson	Democratic	1962	Incumbent lost renomination. Democratic hold.	▌ ✓ Mervyn Dymally (Democratic) 64.4%; ▌Don Grimshaw (Republican) 35.6%
California 32	Glenn M. Anderson	Democratic	1968	Incumbent re-elected.	▌ ✓ Glenn M. Anderson (Democratic) 65.9%; ▌John R. Adler (Republican) 30.8%; ▌Thomas A. Cosgrove (Libertarian) 3.3%
California 33	Wayne R. Grisham	Republican	1978	Incumbent re-elected.	▌ ✓ Wayne R. Grisham (Republican) 70.9%; ▌Fred L. Anderson (Democratic) 29.1%
California 34	Dan Lungren	Republican	1978	Incumbent re-elected.	▌ ✓ Dan Lungren (Republican) 71.8%; ▌Simone (Democratic) 24.1%; ▌John S. Donohue (Peace and Freedom) 4.1%
California 35	James F. Lloyd	Democratic	1974	Incumbent lost re-election. Republican gain.	▌ ✓ David Dreier (Republican) 51.8%; ▌James F. Lloyd (Democratic) 45.4%; ▌Mike Noonan (Peace and Freedom) 2.8%
California 36	George Brown Jr.	Democratic	1962; 1970 (retired); 1972	Incumbent re-elected.	▌ ✓ George Brown Jr. (Democratic) 52.5%; ▌John Paul Stark (Republican) 43.4%; ▌Harry J. Histen (Libertarian) 4.0%
California 37	Jerry Lewis	Republican	1978	Incumbent re-elected.	▌ ✓ Jerry Lewis (Republican) 71.6%; ▌Don Rusk (Democratic) 25.1%; ▌Larry Morris (Libertarian) 3.3%
California 38	Jerry M. Patterson	Democratic	1974	Incumbent re-elected.	▌ ✓ Jerry M. Patterson (Democratic) 55.5%; ▌Art Jacobson (Republican) 40.0%; ▌Chuck Heiser (Libertarian) 4.4%
California 39	William E. Dannemeyer	Republican	1978	Incumbent re-elected.	▌ ✓ William E. Dannemeyer (Republican) 76.3%; ▌Leonard L. Lahtinen (Democratic) 23.7%
California 40	Robert Badham	Republican	1976	Incumbent re-elected.	▌ ✓ Robert Badham (Republican) 70.2%; ▌Michael F. Dow (Democratic) 21.8%; ▌Dan Mahaffey (Libertarian) 8.0%
California 41	Bob Wilson	Republican	1952	Incumbent retired. Republican hold.	▌ ✓ Bill Lowery (Republican) 52.7%; ▌Bob Wilson (Democratic) 43.2%; ▌Joseph D. Alldredge (Libertarian) 4.1%
California 42	Lionel Van Deerlin	Democratic	1962	Incumbent lost re-election. Republican gain.	▌ ✓ Duncan L. Hunter (Republican) 53.3%; ▌Lionel Van Deerlin (Democratic) 46.7%
California 43	Clair Burgener	Republican	1972	Incumbent re-elected.	▌ ✓ Clair Burgener (Republican) 86.6%; ▌Tom Metzger (Democratic) 13.4%

== Colorado ==
District	Incumbent			Results	Candidates
District	Member	Party	First elected	Results	Candidates
Colorado 1	Pat Schroeder	Democratic	1972	Incumbent re-elected.	▌ ✓ Pat Schroeder (Democratic) 59.8%; ▌Naomi Bradford (Republican) 37.7%; ▌John Mason (Libertarian) 2.2%; ▌Harold Sudmeyer (Socialist Workers) 0.3%
Colorado 2	Tim Wirth	Democratic	1974	Incumbent re-elected.	▌ ✓ Tim Wirth (Democratic) 56.4%; ▌John McElderry (Republican) 41.1%; ▌Paul K. Grant (Libertarian) 1.7%; ▌Robert Bruce McFarland (Citizens) 0.8%
Colorado 3	Ray Kogovsek	Democratic	1978	Incumbent re-elected.	▌ ✓ Ray Kogovsek (Democratic) 54.9%; ▌Harold L. McCormick (Republican) 43.7%; ▌James S. Glennie (Libertarian) 1.4%
Colorado 4	James Paul Johnson	Republican	1972	Incumbent retired. Republican hold.	▌ ✓ Hank Brown (Republican) 68.4%; ▌Polly Baca Barragan (Democratic) 29.5%; ▌Cynthia Molson-Smith (Libertarian) 2.1%
Colorado 5	Ken Kramer	Republican	1978	Incumbent re-elected.	▌ ✓ Ken Kramer (Republican) 72.4%; ▌Ed Schreiber (Democratic) 25.3%; ▌John A. Lanning (Libertarian) 2.3%

== Connecticut ==
District	Incumbent			Results	Candidates
District	Member	Party	First elected	Results	Candidates
Connecticut 1	William R. Cotter	Democratic	1970	Incumbent re-elected.	▌ ✓ William R. Cotter (Democratic) 63.0%; ▌Marjorie D. Anderson (Republican) 37.0%
Connecticut 2	Chris Dodd	Democratic	1974	Incumbent retired to run for U.S. Senator. Democratic hold.	▌ ✓ Sam Gejdenson (Democratic) 53.4%; ▌Tony Guglielmo (Republican) 46.6%
Connecticut 3	Robert Giaimo	Democratic	1958	Incumbent retired. Republican gain.	▌ ✓ Lawrence J. DeNardis (Republican) 52.3%; ▌Joe Lieberman (Democratic) 46.5%; ▌Joelle R. Fishman (Citizens) 1.2%
Connecticut 4	Stewart McKinney	Republican	1970	Incumbent re-elected.	▌ ✓ Stewart McKinney (Republican) 62.6%; ▌John A. Phillips (Democratic) 37.4%
Connecticut 5	William R. Ratchford	Democratic	1978	Incumbent re-elected.	▌ ✓ William R. Ratchford (Democratic) 50.4%; ▌Edward M. Donahue (Republican) 49.6%
Connecticut 6	Toby Moffett	Democratic	1974	Incumbent re-elected.	▌ ✓ Toby Moffett (Democratic) 59.0%; ▌Nicholas Schaus (Republican) 40.6%; ▌Louis J. Marietta (Independent) 0.4%

== Delaware ==
District	Incumbent			Results	Candidates
District	Member	Party	First elected	Results	Candidates
Delaware at-large	Thomas B. Evans Jr.	Republican	1976	Incumbent re-elected.	▌ ✓ Thomas B. Evans Jr. (Republican) 58.2%; ▌Robert L. Maxwell (Democratic) 41.2%; ▌Lawrence D. Sullivan (Libertarian) 0.6%

== District of Columbia ==
See Non-voting delegates, below.

== Florida ==
District	Incumbent			Results	Candidates
District	Member	Party	First elected	Results	Candidates
Florida 1	Earl Hutto	Democratic	1978	Incumbent re-elected.	▌ ✓ Earl Hutto (Democratic) 61.2%; ▌Warren Briggs (Republican) 38.8%
Florida 2	Don Fuqua	Democratic	1962	Incumbent re-elected.	▌ ✓ Don Fuqua (Democratic) 70.6%; ▌John R. LaCapra (Republican) 29.4%
Florida 3	Charles E. Bennett	Democratic	1948	Incumbent re-elected.	▌ ✓ Charles E. Bennett (Democratic) 77.0%; ▌Harry Radcliffe (Republican) 23.0%
Florida 4	Bill Chappell	Democratic	1968	Incumbent re-elected.	▌ ✓ Bill Chappell (Democratic) 65.8%; ▌Barney E. Dillard Jr. (Republican) 34.2%
Florida 5	Richard Kelly	Republican	1974	Incumbent lost renomination. Republican hold.	▌ ✓ Bill McCollum (Republican) 55.8%; ▌David Ryan Best (Democratic) 44.2%
Florida 6	Bill Young	Republican	1970	Incumbent re-elected.	▌ ✓ Bill Young (Republican); Uncontested
Florida 7	Sam Gibbons	Democratic	1962	Incumbent re-elected.	▌ ✓ Sam Gibbons (Democratic) 71.8%; ▌Chuck Jones (Republican) 28.2%
Florida 8	Andy Ireland	Democratic	1976	Incumbent re-elected.	▌ ✓ Andy Ireland (Democratic) 69.3%; ▌Scott Nicholson (Republican) 28.2%; ▌Rod Rebholz (Independent) 2.5%
Florida 9	Bill Nelson	Democratic	1978	Incumbent re-elected.	▌ ✓ Bill Nelson (Democratic) 70.4%; ▌Stan Dowiat (Republican) 29.6%
Florida 10	Skip Bafalis	Republican	1972	Incumbent re-elected.	▌ ✓ Skip Bafalis (Republican) 78.9%; ▌Sparky Sparkman (Democratic) 21.1%
Florida 11	Dan Mica	Democratic	1978	Incumbent re-elected.	▌ ✓ Dan Mica (Democratic) 59.5%; ▌Al Coogler (Republican) 40.5%
Florida 12	Edward J. Stack	Democratic	1978	Incumbent lost renomination. Republican gain.	▌ ✓ Clay Shaw (Republican) 54.5%; ▌Alan S. Becker (Democratic) 45.5%
Florida 13	William Lehman	Democratic	1972	Incumbent re-elected.	▌ ✓ William Lehman (Democratic) 74.9%; ▌Alvin E. Entin (Republican) 25.1%
Florida 14	Claude Pepper	Democratic	1962	Incumbent re-elected.	▌ ✓ Claude Pepper (Democratic) 74.9%; ▌Evelio S. Estrella (Republican) 25.1%
Florida 15	Dante Fascell	Democratic	1954	Incumbent re-elected.	▌ ✓ Dante Fascell (Democratic) 65.4%; ▌Herbert J. Hoodwin (Republican) 34.6%

== Georgia ==
District	Incumbent			Results	Candidates
District	Member	Party	First elected	Results	Candidates
Georgia 1	Ronald "Bo" Ginn	Democratic	1972	Incumbent re-elected.	▌ ✓ Ronald "Bo" Ginn (Democratic); Uncontested
Georgia 2	Dawson Mathis	Democratic	1970	Incumbent retired to run for U.S. Senator. Democratic hold.	▌ ✓ Charles Hatcher (Democratic) 73.6%; ▌Jack E. Harrell Jr. (Republican) 26.4%
Georgia 3	Jack Brinkley	Democratic	1966	Incumbent re-elected.	▌ ✓ Jack Brinkley (Democratic); Uncontested
Georgia 4	Elliott H. Levitas	Democratic	1974	Incumbent re-elected.	▌ ✓ Elliott H. Levitas (Democratic) 69.4%; ▌Barry Billington (Republican) 30.6%
Georgia 5	Wyche Fowler	Democratic	1977 (special)	Incumbent re-elected.	▌ ✓ Wyche Fowler (Democratic) 74.0%; ▌F. William Dowda (Republican) 26.0%
Georgia 6	Newt Gingrich	Republican	1978	Incumbent re-elected.	▌ ✓ Newt Gingrich (Republican) 59.1%; ▌Dock H. Davis (Democratic) 40.9%
Georgia 7	Larry McDonald	Democratic	1974	Incumbent re-elected.	▌ ✓ Larry McDonald (Democratic) 68.1%; ▌Richard Castellucis (Republican) 31.9%
Georgia 8	Billy Lee Evans	Democratic	1976	Incumbent re-elected.	▌ ✓ Billy Lee Evans (Democratic) 74.6%; ▌Darwin Carter (Republican) 25.4%
Georgia 9	Ed Jenkins	Democratic	1976	Incumbent re-elected.	▌ ✓ Ed Jenkins (Democratic) 68.0%; ▌David G. Ashworth (Republican) 32.0%
Georgia 10	Doug Barnard Jr.	Democratic	1976	Incumbent re-elected.	▌ ✓ Doug Barnard Jr. (Democratic) 80.2%; ▌Bruce J. Neubauer (Republican) 19.8%

== Hawaii ==
District	Incumbent			Results	Candidates
District	Member	Party	First elected	Results	Candidates
Hawaii 1	Cecil Heftel	Democratic	1976	Incumbent re-elected.	▌ ✓ Cecil Heftel (Democratic) 79.8%; ▌Aloma Keen Noble (Republican) 16.1%; ▌Rockne H. Johnson (Libertarian) 4.1%
Hawaii 2	Daniel Akaka	Democratic	1976	Incumbent re-elected.	▌ ✓ Daniel Akaka (Democratic) 89.9%; ▌Don G. Smith (Libertarian) 10.1%

== Guam ==
See Non-voting delegates, below.

== Idaho ==
District	Incumbent			Results	Candidates
District	Member	Party	First elected	Results	Candidates
Idaho 1	Steve Symms	Republican	1972	Incumbent retired to run for U.S. Senator. Republican hold.	▌ ✓ Larry Craig (Republican) 53.7%; ▌Glenn W. Nichols (Democratic) 46.3%
Idaho 2	George V. Hansen	Republican	1964; 1968 (retired); 1974	Incumbent re-elected.	▌ ✓ George V. Hansen (Republican) 58.8%; ▌Diane Bilyeu (Democratic) 41.2%

== Illinois ==
District	Incumbent			Results	Candidates
District	Member	Party	First elected	Results	Candidates
Illinois 1	Bennett Stewart	Democratic	1978	Incumbent lost renomination. Democratic hold.	▌ ✓ Harold Washington (Democratic) 95.5%; ▌George Williams (Republican) 4.5%
Illinois 2	Morgan F. Murphy	Democratic	1970	Incumbent retired. Democratic hold.	▌ ✓ Gus Savage (Democratic) 88.2%; ▌Marsha A. Harris (Republican) 11.8%
Illinois 3	Marty Russo	Democratic	1974	Incumbent re-elected.	▌ ✓ Marty Russo (Democratic) 68.9%; ▌Lawrence C. Sarsoun (Republican) 31.1%
Illinois 4	Ed Derwinski	Republican	1958	Incumbent re-elected.	▌ ✓ Ed Derwinski (Republican) 68.0%; ▌Richard S. Jalovec (Democratic) 32.0%
Illinois 5	John G. Fary	Democratic	1975 (special)	Incumbent re-elected.	▌ ✓ John G. Fary (Democratic) 79.6%; ▌Robert V. Kotowski (Republican) 20.4%
Illinois 6	Henry Hyde	Republican	1974	Incumbent re-elected.	▌ ✓ Henry Hyde (Republican) 67.0%; ▌Mario Reymond Reda (Democratic) 33.0%
Illinois 7	Cardiss Collins	Democratic	1973 (special)	Incumbent re-elected.	▌ ✓ Cardiss Collins (Democratic) 85.1%; ▌Ruth R. Hooper (Republican) 14.9%
Illinois 8	Dan Rostenkowski	Democratic	1958	Incumbent re-elected.	▌ ✓ Dan Rostenkowski (Democratic) 84.7%; ▌Walter F. Zilke (Republican) 15.3%
Illinois 9	Sidney R. Yates	Democratic	1948; 1962 (retired); 1964	Incumbent re-elected.	▌ ✓ Sidney R. Yates (Democratic) 73.1%; ▌John D. Andrica (Republican) 26.9%
Illinois 10	John Porter	Republican	1980	Incumbent re-elected.	▌ ✓ John Porter (Republican) 60.7%; ▌Robert A. Weinberger (Democratic) 39.3%
Illinois 11	Frank Annunzio	Democratic	1964	Incumbent re-elected.	▌ ✓ Frank Annunzio (Democratic) 69.8%; ▌Michael R. Zanillo (Republican) 30.2%
Illinois 12	Phil Crane	Republican	1969 (special)	Incumbent re-elected.	▌ ✓ Phil Crane (Republican) 74.1%; ▌David McCartney (Democratic) 25.9%
Illinois 13	Robert McClory	Republican	1962	Incumbent re-elected.	▌ ✓ Robert McClory (Republican) 71.7%; ▌Michael Reese (Democratic) 28.3%
Illinois 14	John N. Erlenborn	Republican	1964	Incumbent re-elected.	▌ ✓ John N. Erlenborn (Republican) 76.8%; ▌LeRoy E. Kennel (Democratic) 23.2%
Illinois 15	Tom Corcoran	Republican	1976	Incumbent re-elected.	▌ ✓ Tom Corcoran (Republican) 76.7%; ▌John P. Quillin (Democratic) 23.3%
Illinois 16	John B. Anderson	Republican	1960	Incumbent retired to run for U.S. President. Republican hold.	▌ ✓ Lynn M. Martin (Republican) 67.4%; ▌Douglas R. Aurand (Democratic) 32.6%
Illinois 17	George M. O'Brien	Republican	1972	Incumbent re-elected.	▌ ✓ George M. O'Brien (Republican) 65.8%; ▌Michael A. Murer (Democratic) 34.2%
Illinois 18	Robert H. Michel	Republican	1956	Incumbent re-elected.	▌ ✓ Robert H. Michel (Republican) 62.1%; ▌John L. Knuppel (Democratic) 37.9%
Illinois 19	Tom Railsback	Republican	1966	Incumbent re-elected.	▌ ✓ Tom Railsback (Republican) 73.4%; ▌Thomas J. Hand (Democratic) 26.6%
Illinois 20	Paul Findley	Republican	1960	Incumbent re-elected.	▌ ✓ Paul Findley (Republican) 56.0%; ▌David Robinson (Democratic) 44.0%
Illinois 21	Ed Madigan	Republican	1972	Incumbent re-elected.	▌ ✓ Ed Madigan (Republican) 67.6%; ▌Penny L. Severns (Democratic) 32.4%
Illinois 22	Dan Crane	Republican	1978	Incumbent re-elected.	▌ ✓ Dan Crane (Republican) 68.8%; ▌Peter M. Voelz (Democratic) 31.2%
Illinois 23	Melvin Price	Democratic	1944	Incumbent re-elected.	▌ ✓ Melvin Price (Democratic) 64.4%; ▌Ronald L. Davinroy (Republican) 35.6%
Illinois 24	Paul Simon	Democratic	1974	Incumbent re-elected.	▌ ✓ Paul Simon (Democratic) 49.1%; ▌John T. Anderson (Republican) 48.3%; ▌James H. Barrett (Constitution) 2.6%

== Indiana ==
District	Incumbent			Results	Candidates
District	Member	Party	First elected	Results	Candidates
Indiana 1	Adam Benjamin Jr.	Democratic	1976	Incumbent re-elected.	▌ ✓ Adam Benjamin Jr. (Democratic) 72.0%; ▌Joseph Douglas Harkin (Republican) 28.0%
Indiana 2	Floyd Fithian	Democratic	1974	Incumbent re-elected.	▌ ✓ Floyd Fithian (Democratic) 54.1%; ▌Ernest Niemeyer (Republican) 45.9%
Indiana 3	John Brademas	Democratic	1958	Incumbent lost re-election. Republican gain.	▌ ✓ John P. Hiler (Republican) 55.0%; ▌John Brademas (Democratic) 45.0%
Indiana 4	Dan Quayle	Republican	1976	Incumbent retired to run for U.S. Senator. Republican hold.	▌ ✓ Dan Coats (Republican) 60.5%; ▌John D. Walda (Democratic) 39.1%; ▌Stephen G. Hope (Independent) 0.4%
Indiana 5	Elwood Hillis	Republican	1970	Incumbent re-elected.	▌ ✓ Elwood Hillis (Republican) 61.7%; ▌Nels J. Ackerson (Democratic) 38.3%
Indiana 6	David W. Evans	Democratic	1974	Incumbent re-elected.	▌ ✓ David W. Evans (Democratic) 50.2%; ▌David G. Crane (Republican) 49.8%
Indiana 7	John T. Myers	Republican	1966	Incumbent re-elected.	▌ ✓ John T. Myers (Republican) 66.1%; ▌Patrick D. Carroll (Democratic) 33.2%; ▌Peter P. Tescione Jr. (Independent) 0.8%
Indiana 8	H. Joel Deckard	Republican	1978	Incumbent re-elected.	▌ ✓ H. Joel Deckard (Republican) 55.2%; ▌Kenneth C. Snider (Democratic) 44.8%
Indiana 9	Lee H. Hamilton	Democratic	1964	Incumbent re-elected.	▌ ✓ Lee H. Hamilton (Democratic) 64.4%; ▌George Meyer Jr. (Republican) 35.6%
Indiana 10	Philip Sharp	Democratic	1974	Incumbent re-elected.	▌ ✓ Philip Sharp (Democratic) 53.4%; ▌Bill Frazier (Republican) 46.6%
Indiana 11	Andrew Jacobs Jr.	Democratic	1964; 1972 (lost); 1974	Incumbent re-elected.	▌ ✓ Andrew Jacobs Jr. (Democratic) 57.3%; ▌Sheila Suess (Republican) 42.7%

== Iowa ==
District	Incumbent			Results	Candidates
District	Member	Party	First elected	Results	Candidates
Iowa 1	Jim Leach	Republican	1976	Incumbent re-elected.	▌ ✓ Jim Leach (Republican) 64.1%; ▌Jim Larew (Democratic) 34.9%; ▌Michael R. Grant (Libertarian) 0.7%; ▌Gloria Williams (Socialist) 0.4%
Iowa 2	Tom Tauke	Republican	1978	Incumbent re-elected.	▌ ✓ Tom Tauke (Republican) 54.0%; ▌Steve Sovern (Democratic) 45.1%; ▌Dean Miller (Libertarian) 0.5%; ▌James D. Roberson (Independent) 0.4%
Iowa 3	Chuck Grassley	Republican	1974	Incumbent retired to run for U.S. Senator. Republican hold.	▌ ✓ T. Cooper Evans (Republican) 51.4%; ▌Lynn Cutler (Democratic) 48.5%; ▌James E. Suppus (American) 0.2%
Iowa 4	Neal Edward Smith	Democratic	1958	Incumbent re-elected.	▌ ✓ Neal Edward Smith (Democratic) 53.9%; ▌Donald C. Young (Republican) 45.9%; ▌Kalonji Saadiq (Socialist) 0.2%
Iowa 5	Tom Harkin	Democratic	1974	Incumbent re-elected.	▌ ✓ Tom Harkin (Democratic) 60.2%; ▌Cal Hultman (Republican) 39.8%
Iowa 6	Berkley Bedell	Democratic	1974	Incumbent re-elected.	▌ ✓ Berkley Bedell (Democratic) 64.3%; ▌Clarence S. Carney (Republican) 35.7%

== Kansas ==
District	Incumbent			Results	Candidates
District	Member	Party	First elected	Results	Candidates
Kansas 1	Keith Sebelius	Republican	1968	Incumbent retired. Republican hold.	▌ ✓ Pat Roberts (Republican) 62.3%; ▌Phil Martin (Democratic) 37.7%
Kansas 2	James Edmund Jeffries	Republican	1978	Incumbent re-elected.	▌ ✓ James Edmund Jeffries (Republican) 53.9%; ▌Sam Keys (Democratic) 46.1%
Kansas 3	Larry Winn	Republican	1966	Incumbent re-elected.	▌ ✓ Larry Winn (Republican) 55.5%; ▌Dan Watkins (Democratic) 41.8%; ▌John O. Stewart (Constitution) 2.7%
Kansas 4	Dan Glickman	Democratic	1976	Incumbent re-elected.	▌ ✓ Dan Glickman (Democratic) 68.9%; ▌Clay Hunter (Republican) 31.1%
Kansas 5	Bob Whittaker	Republican	1978	Incumbent re-elected.	▌ ✓ Bob Whittaker (Republican) 74.2%; ▌David L. Miller (Democratic) 24.0%; ▌Jack C. Blackwell (Statesman) 1.8%

== Kentucky ==
District	Incumbent			Results	Candidates
District	Member	Party	First elected	Results	Candidates
Kentucky 1	Carroll Hubbard	Democratic	1974	Incumbent re-elected.	▌ ✓ Carroll Hubbard (Democratic); Uncontested
Kentucky 2	William Natcher	Democratic	1953 (special)	Incumbent re-elected.	▌ ✓ William Natcher (Democratic) 65.7%; ▌Mark T. Watson (Republican) 34.3%
Kentucky 3	Romano Mazzoli	Democratic	1970	Incumbent re-elected.	▌ ✓ Romano Mazzoli (Democratic) 63.7%; ▌Richard Cesler (Republican) 34.6%; ▌John Cumbler (Citizens) 0.9%; ▌Robert D. Vessels (American) 0.3%; ▌Henry Glover Logsdon (Independent) 0.3%
Kentucky 4	Gene Snyder	Republican	1962; 1964 (lost); 1966	Incumbent re-elected.	▌ ✓ Gene Snyder (Republican) 67.0%; ▌Phil M. McGary (Democratic) 33.0%
Kentucky 5	Tim Lee Carter	Republican	1964	Incumbent retired. Republican hold.	▌ ✓ Hal Rogers (Republican) 67.5%; ▌Ted R. Marcum (Democratic) 32.5%
Kentucky 6	Larry J. Hopkins	Republican	1978	Incumbent re-elected.	▌ ✓ Larry J. Hopkins (Republican) 58.9%; ▌Tom Easterly (Democratic) 40.5%; ▌Don Bertram Pratt (Independent) 0.7%
Kentucky 7	Carl D. Perkins	Democratic	1948	Incumbent re-elected.	▌ ✓ Carl D. Perkins (Democratic); Uncontested

== Louisiana ==
Six of the eight incumbents (Livingston, Boggs, Tauzin, Huckaby, Moore and Long) were automatically re-elected by winning majorities in their jungle primaries on Sept. 13. Leach and Roemer were the top two vote getters in the 4th District's jungle primary and advanced to the Nov. 4 general election. When Breaux drew no opposition in the 7th District, he was re-elected without having to appear on a ballot.

District	Incumbent			Results	Candidates
District	Member	Party	First elected	Results	Candidates
Louisiana 1	Bob Livingston	Republican	1977 (special)	Incumbent re-elected.	▌ ✓ Bob Livingston (Republican) 88.4%; ▌Michael J. Musmeci Sr. (Republican) 8.9%; ▌Tristan P. Junius (Independent) 2.7%
Louisiana 2	Lindy Boggs	Democratic	1973 (special)	Incumbent re-elected.	▌ ✓ Lindy Boggs (Democratic) 60.8%; ▌Rob Couhig (Republican) 34.4%; ▌Clyde F. Bel Jr. (Democratic) 4.8%
Louisiana 3	Billy Tauzin	Democratic	1980	Incumbent re-elected.	▌ ✓ Billy Tauzin (Democratic) 85.1%; ▌Bob Namer (Democratic) 14.9%
Louisiana 4	Buddy Leach	Democratic	1978	Incumbent lost re-election. Democratic hold.	▌ ✓ Buddy Roemer (Democratic) 63.8%; ▌Buddy Leach (Democratic) 36.2%
Louisiana 5	Jerry Huckaby	Democratic	1976	Incumbent re-elected.	▌ ✓ Jerry Huckaby (Democratic) 88.8%; ▌L. D. Knox (Democratic) 11.2%
Louisiana 6	Henson Moore	Republican	1974	Incumbent re-elected.	▌ ✓ Henson Moore (Republican) 90.7%; ▌Alice Brooks (Democratic) 9.3%
Louisiana 7	John Breaux	Democratic	1972	Incumbent re-elected.	▌ ✓ John Breaux (Democratic); Uncontested
Louisiana 8	Gillis William Long	Democratic	1962; 1964 (lost renomination); 1972	Incumbent re-elected.	▌ ✓ Gillis William Long (Democratic) 68.9%; ▌Clyde C. Holloway (Republican) 25.4%; ▌Robert H. Mitchell (Republican) 5.7%

== Maine ==
District	Incumbent			Results	Candidates
District	Member	Party	First elected	Results	Candidates
Maine 1	David F. Emery	Republican	1974	Incumbent re-elected.	▌ ✓ David F. Emery (Republican) 68.5%; ▌Harold C. Pachios (Democratic) 31.5%
Maine 2	Olympia Snowe	Republican	1978	Incumbent re-elected.	▌ ✓ Olympia Snowe (Republican) 78.5%; ▌Harold L. Silverman (Democratic) 21.5%

== Maryland ==
District	Incumbent			Results	Candidates
District	Member	Party	First elected	Results	Candidates
Maryland 1	Robert Bauman	Republican	1973 (special)	Incumbent lost re-election. Democratic gain.	▌ ✓ Roy Dyson (Democratic) 51.7%; ▌Robert Bauman (Republican) 48.3%
Maryland 2	Clarence Long	Democratic	1962	Incumbent re-elected.	▌ ✓ Clarence Long (Democratic) 57.4%; ▌Helen Delich Bentley (Republican) 42.6%
Maryland 3	Barbara Mikulski	Democratic	1976	Incumbent re-elected.	▌ ✓ Barbara Mikulski (Democratic) 76.1%; ▌Russell T. Schaffer (Republican) 23.9%
Maryland 4	Marjorie Holt	Republican	1972	Incumbent re-elected.	▌ ✓ Marjorie Holt (Republican) 71.9%; ▌James J. Riley (Democratic) 28.1%
Maryland 5	Gladys Spellman	Democratic	1974	Incumbent re-elected despite medical coma.	▌ ✓ Gladys Spellman (Democratic) 80.5%; ▌Kevin R. Igoe (Republican) 19.5%
Maryland 6	Beverly Byron	Democratic	1978	Incumbent re-elected.	▌ ✓ Beverly Byron (Democratic) 69.9%; ▌Raymond E. Beck (Republican) 30.1%
Maryland 7	Parren Mitchell	Democratic	1970	Incumbent re-elected.	▌ ✓ Parren Mitchell (Democratic) 88.5%; ▌Victor Clark Jr. (Republican) 11.5%
Maryland 8	Michael D. Barnes	Democratic	1978	Incumbent re-elected.	▌ ✓ Michael D. Barnes (Democratic) 59.3%; ▌Newton Steers (Republican) 40.7%

== Massachusetts ==
District	Incumbent			Results	Candidates
District	Member	Party	First elected	Results	Candidates
Massachusetts 1	Silvio O. Conte	Republican	1958	Incumbent re-elected.	▌ ✓ Silvio O. Conte (Republican) 74.9%; ▌Helen Poppy Doyle (Democratic) 25.1%
Massachusetts 2	Edward Boland	Democratic	1952	Incumbent re-elected.	▌ ✓ Edward Boland (Democratic) 67.2%; ▌Thomas P. Swank (Republican) 21.5%; ▌John B. Aubuchon (Independent) 11.3%
Massachusetts 3	Joseph D. Early	Democratic	1974	Incumbent re-elected.	▌ ✓ Joseph D. Early (Democratic) 72.3%; ▌David G. Skehan (Republican) 27.7%
Massachusetts 4	Robert Drinan	Democratic	1970	Incumbent retired after Pope John Paul II issued edict banning priests from holding elective office.. Democratic hold.	▌ ✓ Barney Frank (Democratic) 51.9%; ▌Richard A. Jones (Republican) 48.1%
Massachusetts 5	James Shannon	Democratic	1978	Incumbent re-elected.	▌ ✓ James Shannon (Democratic) 66.0%; ▌William C. Sawyer (Republican) 34.0%
Massachusetts 6	Nicholas Mavroules	Democratic	1978	Incumbent re-elected.	▌ ✓ Nicholas Mavroules (Democratic) 50.8%; ▌Thomas Trimarco (Republican) 47.1%; ▌Donald B. Batchelder (Citizens) 1.5%; ▌Nelson F. Gonzalez (Socialist Workers) 0.6%
Massachusetts 7	Ed Markey	Democratic	1976	Incumbent re-elected.	▌ ✓ Ed Markey (Democratic); Uncontested
Massachusetts 8	Tip O'Neill	Democratic	1952	Incumbent re-elected.	▌ ✓ Tip O'Neill (Democratic) 78.4%; ▌William A. Barnstead (Republican) 21.6%
Massachusetts 9	Joe Moakley	Democratic	1972	Incumbent re-elected.	▌ ✓ Joe Moakley (Democratic); Uncontested
Massachusetts 10	Margaret Heckler	Republican	1966	Incumbent re-elected.	▌ ✓ Margaret Heckler (Republican) 60.6%; ▌Robert E. McCarthy (Democratic) 39.4%
Massachusetts 11	Brian J. Donnelly	Democratic	1978	Incumbent re-elected.	▌ ✓ Brian J. Donnelly (Democratic); Uncontested
Massachusetts 12	Gerry Studds	Democratic	1972	Incumbent re-elected.	▌ ✓ Gerry Studds (Democratic) 73.2%; ▌Paul V. Doane (Republican) 26.8%

== Michigan ==
District	Incumbent			Results	Candidates
District	Member	Party	First elected	Results	Candidates
Michigan 1	John Conyers	Democratic	1964	Incumbent re-elected.	▌ ✓ John Conyers Jr. (Democratic) 94.7%; ▌William M. Bell (Republican) 4.8%; ▌Thomas W. Jones (Libertarian) 0.5%
Michigan 2	Carl Pursell	Republican	1976	Incumbent re-elected.	▌ ✓ Carl Pursell (Republican) 57.3%; ▌Kathleen F. O'Reilly (Democratic) 41.4%; ▌James L. Hudler (Libertarian) 0.7%; ▌John L. Wagner (American Independent) 0.6%
Michigan 3	Howard Wolpe	Democratic	1978	Incumbent re-elected.	▌ ✓ Howard Wolpe (Democratic) 52.0%; ▌James S. Gilmore (Republican) 47.2%; ▌Charles H. Todd (Libertarian) 0.4%; ▌Susan K. Wells (American Independent) 0.4%
Michigan 4	David Stockman	Republican	1976	Incumbent re-elected.	▌ ✓ David Stockman (Republican) 74.7%; ▌Lyndon G. Furst (Democratic) 24.0%; ▌Bruce A. Smith (Libertarian) 0.8%; ▌Robert C. Drenkhahn (American Independent) 0.5%
Michigan 5	Harold S. Sawyer	Republican	1976	Incumbent re-elected.	▌ ✓ Harold S. Sawyer (Republican) 53.2%; ▌Dale Robert Sprik (Democratic) 45.8%; ▌Tom H. Smith (Libertarian) 1.0%
Michigan 6	Bob Carr	Democratic	1974	Incumbent lost re-election. Republican gain.	▌ ✓ James Whitney Dunn (Republican) 50.6%; ▌Bob Carr (Democratic) 49.4%
Michigan 7	Dale Kildee	Democratic	1976	Incumbent re-elected.	▌ ✓ Dale Kildee (Democratic) 92.8%; ▌Dennis L. Berry (Libertarian) 7.2%
Michigan 8	J. Bob Traxler	Democratic	1974	Incumbent re-elected.	▌ ✓ J. Bob Traxler (Democratic) 60.7%; ▌Norman R. Hughes (Republican) 37.7%; ▌Sheila M. Hart (Libertarian) 1.6%
Michigan 9	Guy Vander Jagt	Republican	1966	Incumbent re-elected.	▌ ✓ Guy Vander Jagt (Republican) 96.6%; ▌Marshall A. Tufts (American Independent) 3.4%
Michigan 10	Donald J. Albosta	Democratic	1978	Incumbent re-elected.	▌ ✓ Donald J. Albosta (Democratic) 52.4%; ▌Richard J. Allen (Republican) 46.0%; ▌Frederick J. Dechow (Libertarian) 1.0%; ▌David Isaac (American Independent) 0.5%
Michigan 11	Bob Davis	Republican	1978	Incumbent re-elected.	▌ ✓ Bob Davis (Republican) 65.5%; ▌Dan Dorrity (Democratic) 33.9%; ▌John C. Stariha (American Independent) 0.6%
Michigan 12	David Bonior	Democratic	1976	Incumbent re-elected.	▌ ✓ David Bonior (Democratic) 55.3%; ▌Kirk Walsh (Republican) 44.7%
Michigan 13	Charles Diggs	Democratic	1954	Incumbent resigned June 3, 1980, after being censured by the U.S. House. Democratic hold. Winner also elected to finish the term, see above.	▌ ✓ George Crockett Jr. (Democratic) 91.5%; ▌M. Michael Hurd (Republican) 7.4%; ▌Robert W. Roddis (Libertarian) 1.0%
Michigan 14	Lucien Nedzi	Democratic	1961 (special)	Incumbent retired. Democratic hold.	▌ ✓ Dennis Hertel (Democratic) 53.3%; ▌Vic Caputo (Republican) 46.2%; ▌John D. Litle (Libertarian) 0.5%
Michigan 15	William D. Ford	Democratic	1964	Incumbent re-elected.	▌ ✓ William D. Ford (Democratic) 67.7%; ▌Gerald R. Carlson (Republican) 31.6%; ▌Aldi C. Fuhrmann (American Independent) 0.7%
Michigan 16	John Dingell	Democratic	1955 (special)	Incumbent re-elected.	▌ ✓ John Dingell (Democratic) 69.9%; ▌Pamella A. Seay (Republican) 28.2%; ▌R. Scott Davidson (Libertarian) 1.2%; ▌Ronald Lee Slote (American Independent) 0.7%
Michigan 17	William M. Brodhead	Democratic	1974	Incumbent re-elected.	▌ ✓ William M. Brodhead (Democratic) 73.1%; ▌L. Patterson (Republican) 25.4%; ▌William B. Krebaum (Libertarian) 1.5%
Michigan 18	James J. Blanchard	Democratic	1974	Incumbent re-elected.	▌ ✓ James J. Blanchard (Democratic) 65.3%; ▌Betty J. Suida (Republican) 33.0%; ▌Bette Erwin (Libertarian) 1.1%; ▌Howard L. Neal (American Independent) 0.7%
Michigan 19	William Broomfield	Republican	1956	Incumbent re-elected.	▌ ✓ William Broomfield (Republican) 72.7%; ▌Wayne E. Daniels (Democratic) 25.9%; ▌Brian Richard Wright (Libertarian) 1.4%

== Minnesota ==
As of 2021, this is the last time the Republican Party held a majority of congressional districts from Minnesota.

District	Incumbent			Results	Candidates
District	Member	Party	First elected	Results	Candidates
Minnesota 1	Arlen Erdahl	Independent- Republican	1978	Incumbent re-elected.	▌ ✓ Arlen Erdahl (Ind.-Republican) 71.8%; ▌Russell V. Smith (DFL) 28.2%
Minnesota 2	Tom Hagedorn	Independent- Republican	1974	Incumbent re-elected.	▌ ✓ Tom Hagedorn (Ind.-Republican) 60.6%; ▌Harold J. Bergquist (DFL) 39.4%
Minnesota 3	Bill Frenzel	Independent- Republican	1970	Incumbent re-elected.	▌ ✓ Bill Frenzel (Ind.-Republican) 75.6%; ▌Joel A. Saliterman (DFL) 24.4%
Minnesota 4	Bruce Vento	DFL	1976	Incumbent re-elected.	▌ ✓ Bruce Vento (DFL) 58.5%; ▌John Berg (Ind.-Republican) 40.5%; ▌James Kendrick (Socialist Workers) 1.0%
Minnesota 5	Martin Olav Sabo	DFL	1978	Incumbent re-elected.	▌ ✓ Martin Olav Sabo (DFL) 70.1%; ▌John Doherty (Ind.-Republican) 26.7%; ▌Jeffrey M. Miller (New Union) 1.4%; ▌Scott Wallace (Industrial Government) 0.9%; ▌Steve Thomas (Socialist Workers) 0.9%
Minnesota 6	Rick Nolan	DFL	1974	Incumbent retired. Independent-Republican gain.	▌ ✓ Vin Weber (Ind.-Republican) 52.7%; ▌Archie Baumann (DFL) 47.3%
Minnesota 7	Arlan Stangeland	Independent- Republican	1977 (special)	Incumbent re-elected.	▌ ✓ Arlan Stangeland (Ind.-Republican) 52.1%; ▌Gene R. Wenstrom (DFL) 47.9%
Minnesota 8	Jim Oberstar	DFL	1974	Incumbent re-elected.	▌ ✓ Jim Oberstar (DFL) 70.4%; ▌Edward Fiore (Ind.-Republican) 28.0%; ▌Ilona Gersh (Socialist Workers) 1.6%

== Mississippi ==
District	Incumbent			Results	Candidates
District	Member	Party	First elected	Results	Candidates
Mississippi 1	Jamie Whitten	Democratic	1941 (special)	Incumbent re-elected.	▌ ✓ Jamie Whitten (Democratic) 63.0%; ▌Terrill K. Moffett (Republican) 37.0%
Mississippi 2	David R. Bowen	Democratic	1972	Incumbent re-elected.	▌ ✓ David R. Bowen (Democratic) 69.6%; ▌Frank Drake (Republican) 30.4%
Mississippi 3	Sonny Montgomery	Democratic	1966	Incumbent re-elected.	▌ ✓ Sonny Montgomery (Democratic); Uncontested
Mississippi 4	Jon Hinson	Republican	1978	Incumbent re-elected.	▌ ✓ Jon Hinson (Republican) 39.0%; ▌Leslie B. McLemore (Independent) 29.8%; ▌Britt R. Singletary (Democratic) 29.4%; ▌John Wayne McInerney (Independent) 1.9%
Mississippi 5	Trent Lott	Republican	1972	Incumbent re-elected.	▌ ✓ Trent Lott (Republican) 73.9%; ▌Jimmy McVeay (Democratic) 26.1%

== Missouri ==
District	Incumbent			Results	Candidates
District	Member	Party	First elected	Results	Candidates
Missouri 1	Bill Clay	Democratic	1968	Incumbent re-elected.	▌ ✓ Bill Clay (Democratic) 70.2%; ▌Bill White (Republican) 29.8%
Missouri 2	Robert A. Young	Democratic	1976	Incumbent re-elected.	▌ ✓ Robert A. Young (Democratic) 64.4%; ▌John O. Shields (Republican) 35.6%
Missouri 3	Dick Gephardt	Democratic	1976	Incumbent re-elected.	▌ ✓ Dick Gephardt (Democratic) 77.6%; ▌Robert A. Cedarburg (Republican) 22.4%
Missouri 4	Ike Skelton	Democratic	1976	Incumbent re-elected.	▌ ✓ Ike Skelton (Democratic) 67.8%; ▌Bill Baker (Republican) 32.2%
Missouri 5	Richard Bolling	Democratic	1948	Incumbent re-elected.	▌ ✓ Richard Bolling (Democratic) 70.1%; ▌Vincent E. Baker (Republican) 29.9%
Missouri 6	Tom Coleman	Republican	1976	Incumbent re-elected.	▌ ✓ Tom Coleman (Republican) 70.6%; ▌Vernon King (Democratic) 29.4%
Missouri 7	Gene Taylor	Republican	1972	Incumbent re-elected.	▌ ✓ Gene Taylor (Republican) 67.8%; ▌Ken Young (Democratic) 32.2%
Missouri 8	Richard Howard Ichord Jr.	Democratic	1960	Incumbent retired. Republican gain.	▌ ✓ Wendell Bailey (Republican) 57.1%; ▌Steve Gardner (Democratic) 42.9%
Missouri 9	Harold Volkmer	Democratic	1976	Incumbent re-elected.	▌ ✓ Harold Volkmer (Democratic) 56.5%; ▌John W. Turner (Republican) 43.5%
Missouri 10	Bill Burlison	Democratic	1968	Incumbent lost re-election. Republican gain.	▌ ✓ Bill Emerson (Republican) 55.2%; ▌Bill Burlison (Democratic) 44.8%

== Montana ==
District	Incumbent			Results	Candidates
District	Member	Party	First elected	Results	Candidates
Montana 1	Pat Williams	Democratic	1978	Incumbent re-elected.	▌ ✓ Pat Williams (Democratic) 61.4%; ▌John K. McDonald (Republican) 38.6%
Montana 2	Ron Marlenee	Republican	1976	Incumbent re-elected.	▌ ✓ Ron Marlenee (Republican) 59.1%; ▌Thomas G. Monahan (Democratic) 40.9%

== Nebraska ==
District	Incumbent			Results	Candidates
District	Member	Party	First elected	Results	Candidates
Nebraska 1	Doug Bereuter	Republican	1978	Incumbent re-elected.	▌ ✓ Doug Bereuter (Republican) 78.7%; ▌Rex S. Story (Democratic) 21.3%
Nebraska 2	John Joseph Cavanaugh III	Democratic	1976	Incumbent retired. Republican gain.	▌ ✓ Hal Daub (Republican) 53.1%; ▌Richard Fellman (Democratic) 43.8%; ▌Susan K. Putney (Libertarian) 3.1%
Nebraska 3	Virginia D. Smith	Republican	1974	Incumbent re-elected.	▌ ✓ Virginia D. Smith (Republican) 83.9%; ▌Stan Ditus (Democratic) 16.1%

== Nevada ==
District	Incumbent			Results	Candidates
District	Member	Party	First elected	Results	Candidates
Nevada at-large	James David Santini	Democratic	1974	Incumbent re-elected.	▌ ✓ James David Santini (Democratic) 70.0%; ▌Vince Saunders (Republican) 26.8%; ▌Harry Joe Mangrum (Libertarian) 3.3%

== New Hampshire ==
District	Incumbent			Results	Candidates
District	Member	Party	First elected	Results	Candidates
New Hampshire 1	Norman D'Amours	Democratic	1974	Incumbent re-elected.	▌ ✓ Norman D'Amours (Democratic) 60.8%; ▌Marshall W. Cobleigh (Republican) 39.2%
New Hampshire 2	James Colgate Cleveland	Republican	1962	Incumbent retired. Republican hold.	▌ ✓ Judd Gregg (Republican) 64.1%; ▌Maurice L. Arel (Democratic) 35.9%

== New Jersey ==
District	Incumbent			Results	Candidates
District	Member	Party	First elected	Results	Candidates
New Jersey 1	James Florio	Democratic	1974	Incumbent re-elected.	▌ ✓ James Florio (Democratic) 76.7%; ▌Scott L. Sibert (Republican) 21.9%; ▌Thomas S. Watson Jr. (Independent) 0.7%; ▌Ronald K. Wishart (Libertarian) 0.5%; ▌Julius Levin (Socialist Labor) 0.1%
New Jersey 2	William J. Hughes	Democratic	1974	Incumbent re-elected.	▌ ✓ William J. Hughes (Democratic) 57.5%; ▌Beech N. Fox (Republican) 41.2%; ▌Robert C. Rothhouse (Libertarian) 1.0%; ▌Adele Frisch (Socialist Labor) 0.4%
New Jersey 3	James J. Howard	Democratic	1964	Incumbent re-elected.	▌ ✓ James J. Howard (Democratic) 49.9%; ▌Marie Sheehan Muhler (Republican) 49.0%; ▌Tom Palven (Libertarian) 0.7%; ▌Lawrence D. Erickson (Socialist) 0.3%; ▌L. James Wilson (Independent) 0.1%
New Jersey 4	Frank Thompson	Democratic	1954	Incumbent lost re-election. Republican gain.	▌ ✓ Chris Smith (Republican) 56.6%; ▌Frank Thompson (Democratic) 40.6%; ▌Jack Moyers (Libertarian) 1.7%; ▌Paul B. Rizzo (Independent) 1.1%
New Jersey 5	Millicent Fenwick	Republican	1974	Incumbent re-elected.	▌ ✓ Millicent Fenwick (Republican) 77.5%; ▌Kieran E. Pillion Jr. (Democratic) 20.5%; ▌Carl R. Samson (Libertarian) 1.2%; ▌Jasper C. Gould (Independent) 0.8%
New Jersey 6	Edwin B. Forsythe	Republican	1970	Incumbent re-elected.	▌ ✓ Edwin B. Forsythe (Republican) 56.3%; ▌Lewis M. Weinstein (Democratic) 41.3%; ▌Virginia A. Flynn (Libertarian) 1.0%; ▌John Kinnevy III (Citizens) 0.8%; ▌Donald L. Smith (Constitution) 0.3%; ▌Bernardo S. Doganiero (Socialist Labor) 0.2%
New Jersey 7	Andrew Maguire	Democratic	1974	Incumbent lost re-election. Republican gain.	▌ ✓ Marge Roukema (Republican) 50.7%; ▌Andrew Maguire (Democratic) 46.5%; ▌Patrick Randazzo (Pro-Life) 1.7%; ▌Robert Shapiro (Libertarian) 0.8%; ▌Martin E. Wendelken (Independent) 0.3%
New Jersey 8	Robert A. Roe	Democratic	1970	Incumbent re-elected.	▌ ✓ Robert A. Roe (Democratic) 67.2%; ▌William R. Cleveland (Republican) 31.4%; ▌Donna Rabel (Socialist Labor) 0.9%; ▌Michael Horowitz (Libertarian) 0.6%
New Jersey 9	Harold C. Hollenbeck	Republican	1976	Incumbent re-elected.	▌ ✓ Harold C. Hollenbeck (Republican) 59.1%; ▌Gabriel M. Ambrosio (Democratic) 38.3%; ▌Henry Koch (Libertarian) 1.2%; ▌Herbert H. Shaw (Independent) 0.8%; ▌Edward G. Davis (Citizens) 0.6%
New Jersey 10	Peter W. Rodino	Democratic	1948	Incumbent re-elected.	▌ ✓ Peter W. Rodino (Democratic) 85.3%; ▌Everett J. Jennings (Republican) 13.2%; ▌Christine Keno (Human Rights) 0.6%; ▌Frankie Lee Scott (Independent) 0.3%; ▌Ronald Penque (Libertarian) 0.3%; ▌Christine Hildebrand (Socialist Workers) 0.2%
New Jersey 11	Joseph Minish	Democratic	1962	Incumbent re-elected.	▌ ✓ Joseph Minish (Democratic) 63.0%; ▌Robert A. Davis (Republican) 34.3%; ▌Jon Britton (Socialist Workers) 1.0%; ▌Robert G. Trugman (Independent) 1.0%; ▌Richard S. Roth (Libertarian) 0.8%
New Jersey 12	Matthew J. Rinaldo	Republican	1972	Incumbent re-elected.	▌ ✓ Matthew J. Rinaldo (Republican) 77.1%; ▌Rose Zeidwerg Monyek (Democratic) 20.9%; ▌David-Leif Jensen (Independent) 1.3%; ▌William Vandersteel (Libertarian) 0.6%
New Jersey 13	Jim Courter	Republican	1978	Incumbent re-elected.	▌ ✓ Jim Courter (Republican) 71.6%; ▌Dave Stickle (Democratic) 26.4%; ▌John S. Schafer (Libertarian) 2.0%
New Jersey 14	Frank J. Guarini	Democratic	1978	Incumbent re-elected.	▌ ✓ Frank J. Guarini (Democratic) 64.2%; ▌Dennis Teti (Republican) 33.7%; ▌Jonathan Steele (Libertarian) 1.3%; ▌Kenneth Famularo (Independent) 0.8%
New Jersey 15	Edward J. Patten	Democratic	1962	Incumbent retired. Democratic hold.	▌ ✓ Bernard J. Dwyer (Democratic) 53.4%; ▌William J. O'Sullivan Jr. (Republican) 43.8%; ▌Ira W. Mintz (Independent) 1.7%; ▌Charles Hart (Libertarian) 1.1%

== New Mexico ==
District	Incumbent			Results	Candidates
District	Member	Party	First elected	Results	Candidates
New Mexico 1	Manuel Lujan Jr.	Republican	1968	Incumbent re-elected.	▌ ✓ Manuel Lujan Jr. (Republican) 51.0%; ▌Bill Richardson (Democratic) 49.0%
New Mexico 2	Vacant			Harold L. Runnels (D) died August 5, 1980. Republican gain.	▌ ✓ Joe Skeen (Republican) 38.0%; ▌David W. King (Democratic) 34.0%; ▌Dorothy Runnels (Independent) 28.0%

== New York ==
District	Incumbent			Results	Candidates
District	Member	Party	First elected	Results	Candidates
New York 1	William Carney	Conservative	1978	Incumbent re-elected.	▌ ✓ William Carney (Conservative/Rep.) (Note: William Carney was re-elected on the Republican line.) 56.3%; ▌Thomas A. Twomey (Democratic) 41.9%; ▌Richard M. Cummings (Liberal) 1.8%
New York 2	Thomas Downey	Democratic	1974	Incumbent re-elected.	▌ ✓ Thomas Downey (Democratic) 56.3%; ▌Louis J. Modica (Republican) 43.7%
New York 3	Jerome Ambro	Democratic	1974	Incumbent lost re-election. Republican gain.	▌ ✓ Gregory W. Carman (Republican) 50.1%; ▌Jerome Ambro (Democratic) 47.5%; ▌John T. Meehan (Liberal) 2.5%
New York 4	Norman F. Lent	Republican	1970	Incumbent re-elected.	▌ ✓ Norman F. Lent (Republican) 66.8%; ▌Charles F. Brennan (Democratic) 33.2%
New York 5	John W. Wydler	Republican	1962	Incumbent retired. Republican hold.	▌ ✓ Raymond J. McGrath (Republican) 57.7%; ▌Karen S. Burstein (Democratic) 42.3%
New York 6	Lester L. Wolff	Democratic	1964	Incumbent lost re-election. Republican gain.	▌ ✓ John LeBoutillier (Republican) 52.8%; ▌Lester L. Wolff (Democratic) 47.2%
New York 7	Joseph P. Addabbo	Democratic	1960	Incumbent re-elected.	▌ ✓ Joseph P. Addabbo (Democratic) 95.3%; ▌Francis A. Lees (Conservative) 4.7%
New York 8	Benjamin Stanley Rosenthal	Democratic	1962	Incumbent re-elected.	▌ ✓ Benjamin Stanley Rosenthal (Democratic) 75.6%; ▌Albert Lemishow (Republican) 24.4%
New York 9	Geraldine Ferraro	Democratic	1978	Incumbent re-elected.	▌ ✓ Geraldine Ferraro (Democratic) 58.3%; ▌Vito P. Battista (Republican) 40.7%; ▌Gertrude Geniale (Liberal) 1.0%
New York 10	Mario Biaggi	Democratic	1968	Incumbent re-elected.	▌ ✓ Mario Biaggi (Democratic) 94.5%; ▌Joseph P. Cavanna (Conservative) 3.9%; ▌Michael F. Mari (Right to Life) 1.6%
New York 11	James H. Scheuer	Democratic	1964; 1972 (lost); 1974	Incumbent re-elected.	▌ ✓ James H. Scheuer (Democratic) 74.1%; ▌Andrew E. Carlan (Republican) 25.9%
New York 12	Shirley Chisholm	Democratic	1968	Incumbent re-elected.	▌ ✓ Shirley Chisholm (Democratic) 87.1%; ▌Charles Gibbs (Republican) 8.3%; ▌Ralph J. Carrano (Conservative) 3.3%; ▌Joseph N. O. Caesar (Right to Life) 1.3%
New York 13	Stephen Solarz	Democratic	1974	Incumbent re-elected.	▌ ✓ Stephen Solarz (Democratic) 79.4%; ▌Harry DeMell (Republican) 18.9%; ▌Brendan J. Connolly (Right to Life) 1.6%
New York 14	Fred Richmond	Democratic	1974	Incumbent re-elected.	▌ ✓ Fred Richmond (Democratic) 76.1%; ▌Christopher Lovell (Republican) 14.0%; ▌Moses S. Harris (Independent) 7.0%; ▌Keith E. Jones (Socialist Workers) 1.8%; ▌Roy G. McKenzie (Right to Life) 1.1%
New York 15	Leo C. Zeferetti	Democratic	1974	Incumbent re-elected.	▌ ✓ Leo C. Zeferetti (Democratic) 50.2%; ▌Paul M. Atanasio (Republican) 46.9%; ▌Peter A. McNeill (Liberal) 2.9%
New York 16	Elizabeth Holtzman	Democratic	1972	Incumbent retired to run for U.S. Senator. Democratic hold.	▌ ✓ Chuck Schumer (Democratic) 77.5%; ▌Theodore Silverman (Republican) 19.6%; ▌Mary B. Spaulding (Right to Life) 2.9%
New York 17	John M. Murphy	Democratic	1962	Incumbent lost re-election. Republican gain.	▌ ✓ Guy Molinari (Republican) 47.8%; ▌John M. Murphy (Democratic) 35.0%; ▌Mary T. Codd (Liberal) 17.2%
New York 18	Bill Green	Republican	1978	Incumbent re-elected.	▌ ✓ Bill Green (Republican) 56.7%; ▌Mark Green (Democratic) 42.7%; ▌Arthur L. Washburn Jr. (Right to Life) 0.7%
New York 19	Charles Rangel	Democratic	1970	Incumbent re-elected.	▌ ✓ Charles Rangel (Democratic) 96.2%; ▌Marjorie Garvey (Conservative) 3.0%; ▌Reba Williams Dixon (Socialist Workers) 0.8%
New York 20	Ted Weiss	Democratic	1976	Incumbent re-elected.	▌ ✓ Ted Weiss (Democratic) 82.4%; ▌James E. Greene (Republican) 14.6%; ▌David I. Caplan (Conservative) 2.1%; ▌Robert E. Massi (Socialist Labor) 0.8%
New York 21	Robert García	Democratic	1978	Incumbent re-elected.	▌ ✓ Robert García (Democratic) 98.2%; ▌Loidis R. Cordero (Right to Life) 1.0%; ▌Gina A. Aceto (Conservative) 0.8%
New York 22	Jonathan Brewster Bingham	Democratic	1964	Incumbent re-elected.	▌ ✓ Jonathan Brewster Bingham (Democratic) 83.9%; ▌Robert Black (Republican) 12.6%; ▌James J. Whalen (Conservative) 3.5%
New York 23	Peter A. Peyser	Democratic	1970; 1976 (retired); 1978	Incumbent re-elected.	▌ ✓ Peter A. Peyser (Democratic) 56.2%; ▌Andrew A. Albanese (Republican) 43.8%
New York 24	Richard Ottinger	Democratic	1964; 1970 (retired); 1974	Incumbent re-elected.	▌ ✓ Richard Ottinger (Democratic) 59.4%; ▌Joseph W. Christiana (Republican) 39.6%; ▌Richard O. Reyes (Liberal) 1.0%
New York 25	Hamilton Fish IV	Republican	1968	Incumbent re-elected.	▌ ✓ Hamilton Fish IV (Republican) 81.0%; ▌Gunars M. Ozols (Democratic) 19.0%
New York 26	Benjamin Gilman	Republican	1972	Incumbent re-elected.	▌ ✓ Benjamin Gilman (Republican) 74.3%; ▌Eugene R. Victor (Democratic) 20.3%; ▌Edmond W. Farrell (Right to Life) 4.7%; ▌Tom Goonan (Libertarian) 0.7%
New York 27	Matthew F. McHugh	Democratic	1974	Incumbent re-elected.	▌ ✓ Matthew F. McHugh (Democratic) 55.0%; ▌Neil Tyler Wallace (Republican) 44.0%; ▌Louis F. Muenkel (Right to Life) 0.9%
New York 28	Samuel S. Stratton	Democratic	1958	Incumbent re-elected.	▌ ✓ Samuel S. Stratton (Democratic) 77.9%; ▌Frank Wicks (Republican) 17.8%; ▌Mary A. Bradt (Conservative) 3.7%; ▌Patricia Mayberry (Socialist Workers) 0.6%
New York 29	Gerald Solomon	Republican	1978	Incumbent re-elected.	▌ ✓ Gerald Solomon (Republican) 66.7%; ▌Rodger L. Hurley (Democratic) 33.3%
New York 30	Robert C. McEwen	Republican	1964	Incumbent retired. Republican hold.	▌ ✓ David O'Brien Martin (Republican) 63.8%; ▌Mary Anne Krupsak (Democratic) 31.6%; ▌John R. Zagame (Right to Life) 4.6%
New York 31	Donald J. Mitchell	Republican	1972	Incumbent re-elected.	▌ ✓ Donald J. Mitchell (Republican) 77.5%; ▌Irving A. Schwartz (Democratic) 22.5%
New York 32	James M. Hanley	Democratic	1964	Incumbent retired. Republican gain.	▌ ✓ George C. Wortley (Republican) 60.4%; ▌Jeffrey S. Brooks (Democratic) 31.6%; ▌Peter Del Giorno (Right to Life) 6.7%; ▌James Northrup (Libertarian) 1.3%
New York 33	Gary A. Lee	Republican	1978	Incumbent re-elected.	▌ ✓ Gary A. Lee (Republican) 75.8%; ▌Dolores M. Reed (Democratic) 22.6%; ▌William L. Jones (Right to Life) 1.7%
New York 34	Frank Horton	Republican	1962	Incumbent re-elected.	▌ ✓ Frank Horton (Republican) 72.9%; ▌James R. Toole (Democratic) 20.7%; ▌Clyde O. Benoy (Conservative) 3.2%; ▌William Bastuk (Right to Life) 1.7%; ▌David D. Hoesly (Libertarian) 1.4%
New York 35	Barber Conable	Republican	1964	Incumbent re-elected.	▌ ✓ Barber Conable (Republican) 72.2%; ▌John M. Owens (Democratic) 25.3%; ▌Bernard M. O'Connor (Right to Life) 2.1%; ▌Lydia Bayoneta (Workers) 0.4%
New York 36	John J. LaFalce	Democratic	1974	Incumbent re-elected.	▌ ✓ John J. LaFalce (Democratic) 71.7%; ▌H. William Feder (Republican) 28.3%
New York 37	Henry J. Nowak	Democratic	1974	Incumbent re-elected.	▌ ✓ Henry J. Nowak (Democratic) 83.0%; ▌Roger Heymanowski (Republican) 14.5%; ▌Thomas A. O'Connor (Right to Life) 2.5%
New York 38	Jack Kemp	Republican	1970	Incumbent re-elected.	▌ ✓ Jack Kemp (Republican) 81.6%; ▌Gale A. Denn (Democratic) 18.4%
New York 39	Stan Lundine	Democratic	1976	Incumbent re-elected.	▌ ✓ Stan Lundine (Democratic) 54.7%; ▌James Abdella (Republican) 43.8%; ▌Genevieve F. Ronan (Right to Life) 1.5%

== North Carolina ==
District	Incumbent			Results	Candidates
District	Member	Party	First elected	Results	Candidates
North Carolina 1	Walter B. Jones Sr.	Democratic	1966	Incumbent re-elected.	▌ ✓ Walter B. Jones Sr. (Democratic); Uncontested
North Carolina 2	Lawrence H. Fountain	Democratic	1952	Incumbent re-elected.	▌ ✓ Lawrence H. Fountain (Democratic) 73.4%; ▌Barry Lynn Gardner (Republican) 26.6%
North Carolina 3	Charles Orville Whitley	Democratic	1976	Incumbent re-elected.	▌ ✓ Charles Orville Whitley (Democratic) 68.3%; ▌Larry J. Parker (Republican) 31.7%
North Carolina 4	Ike Franklin Andrews	Democratic	1972	Incumbent re-elected.	▌ ✓ Ike Franklin Andrews (Democratic) 52.6%; ▌Thurman Hogan (Republican) 45.8%; ▌John Cunningham (Libertarian) 1.5%
North Carolina 5	Stephen L. Neal	Democratic	1974	Incumbent re-elected.	▌ ✓ Stephen L. Neal (Democratic) 51.0%; ▌Anne Bagnal (Republican) 48.8%; ▌Jeffery K. Miller (Socialist Workers) 0.2%
North Carolina 6	L. Richardson Preyer	Democratic	1968	Incumbent lost re-election. Republican gain.	▌ ✓ Walter E. Johnston III (Republican) 51.1%; ▌L. Richardson Preyer (Democratic) 48.9%
North Carolina 7	Charlie Rose	Democratic	1972	Incumbent re-elected.	▌ ✓ Charlie Rose (Democratic) 68.7%; ▌Vivian S. Wright (Republican) 31.3%
North Carolina 8	Bill Hefner	Democratic	1974	Incumbent re-elected.	▌ ✓ Bill Hefner (Democratic) 58.5%; ▌L. E. Harris (Republican) 41.5%
North Carolina 9	James G. Martin	Republican	1972	Incumbent re-elected.	▌ ✓ James G. Martin (Republican) 58.6%; ▌Randall R. Kincaid (Democratic) 41.4%
North Carolina 10	James T. Broyhill	Republican	1962	Incumbent re-elected.	▌ ✓ James T. Broyhill (Republican) 69.7%; ▌James O. Icenhour (Democratic) 30.3%
North Carolina 11	V. Lamar Gudger	Democratic	1976	Incumbent lost re-election. Republican gain.	▌ ✓ Bill Hendon (Republican) 53.5%; ▌V. Lamar Gudger (Democratic) 46.5%

== North Dakota ==
District	Incumbent			Results	Candidates
District	Member	Party	First elected	Results	Candidates
North Dakota at-large	Mark Andrews	Republican	1962	Incumbent retired to run for U.S. Senator. Democratic-NPL gain.	▌ ✓ Byron Dorgan (Democratic-NPL) 56.8%; ▌Jim Smykowski (Republican) 42.6%; ▌John Lengenfelder (Independent) 0.3%; ▌Torfin A. Teigen (Independent) 0.3%

== Ohio ==
District	Incumbent			Results	Candidates
District	Member	Party	First elected	Results	Candidates
Ohio 1	Bill Gradison	Republican	1974	Incumbent re-elected.	▌ ✓ Bill Gradison (Republican) 74.2%; ▌Donald J. Zwick (Democratic) 23.6%
Ohio 2	Tom Luken	Democratic	1974 (special); 1974 (lost); 1976	Incumbent re-elected.	▌ ✓ Tom Luken (Democratic) 58.7%; ▌Tom Atkins (Republican) 41.3%
Ohio 3	Tony P. Hall	Democratic	1978	Incumbent re-elected.	▌ ✓ Tony P. Hall (Democratic) 57.3%; ▌Albert H. Sealy (Republican) 40.0%; ▌Richard L. Righter (Independent) 1.7%; ▌Robert E. Tharpe (Independent) 1.0%
Ohio 4	Tennyson Guyer	Republican	1972	Incumbent re-elected.	▌ ✓ Tennyson Guyer (Republican) 72.3%; ▌Gerry Tebben (Democratic) 27.7%
Ohio 5	Del Latta	Republican	1958	Incumbent re-elected.	▌ ✓ Del Latta (Republican) 70.4%; ▌James Robert Sherck (Democratic) 29.6%
Ohio 6	Bill Harsha	Republican	1960	Incumbent retired. Republican hold.	▌ ✓ Bob McEwen (Republican) 54.6%; ▌Ted Strickland (Democratic) 45.4%
Ohio 7	Bud Brown	Republican	1965 (special)	Incumbent re-elected.	▌ ✓ Bud Brown (Republican) 76.1%; ▌Donald Hollister (Democratic) 23.9%
Ohio 8	Tom Kindness	Republican	1974	Incumbent re-elected.	▌ ✓ Tom Kindness (Republican) 76.0%; ▌John W. Griffin (Democratic) 24.0%
Ohio 9	Thomas L. Ashley	Democratic	1954	Incumbent lost re-election. Republican gain.	▌ ✓ Ed Weber (Republican) 56.2%; ▌Thomas L. Ashley (Democratic) 39.9%; ▌Edward Silvio Emery (Independent) 2.5%; ▌Toby E. Emmerich (Independent) 1.4%
Ohio 10	Clarence E. Miller	Republican	1966	Incumbent re-elected.	▌ ✓ Clarence E. Miller (Republican) 74.4%; ▌Jack E. Stecher (Democratic) 25.6%
Ohio 11	J. William Stanton	Republican	1964	Incumbent re-elected.	▌ ✓ J. William Stanton (Republican) 69.3%; ▌Patrick James Donlin (Democratic) 27.6%; ▌Harold V. Richard Jr. (Independent) 3.1%
Ohio 12	Samuel L. Devine	Republican	1958	Incumbent lost re-election. Democratic gain.	▌ ✓ Bob Shamansky (Democratic) 52.6%; ▌Samuel L. Devine (Republican) 47.4%
Ohio 13	Don Pease	Democratic	1976	Incumbent re-elected.	▌ ✓ Don Pease (Democratic) 63.8%; ▌David Earl Armstrong (Republican) 36.2%
Ohio 14	John F. Seiberling	Democratic	1970	Incumbent re-elected.	▌ ✓ John F. Seiberling (Democratic) 64.9%; ▌Louis A. Mangels (Republican) 35.1%
Ohio 15	Chalmers Wylie	Republican	1966	Incumbent re-elected.	▌ ✓ Chalmers Wylie (Republican) 72.6%; ▌Terry Freeman (Democratic) 27.4%
Ohio 16	Ralph Regula	Republican	1972	Incumbent re-elected.	▌ ✓ Ralph Regula (Republican) 79.3%; ▌Larry V. Slagle (Democratic) 20.7%
Ohio 17	John M. Ashbrook	Republican	1960	Incumbent re-elected.	▌ ✓ John M. Ashbrook (Republican) 72.9%; ▌Donald E. Yunker (Democratic) 27.1%
Ohio 18	Douglas Applegate	Democratic	1976	Incumbent re-elected.	▌ ✓ Douglas Applegate (Democratic) 76.1%; ▌Gary L. Hammersley (Republican) 23.9%
Ohio 19	Lyle Williams	Republican	1978	Incumbent re-elected.	▌ ✓ Lyle Williams (Republican) 58.1%; ▌Harry Meshel (Democratic) 41.9%
Ohio 20	Mary Rose Oakar	Democratic	1976	Incumbent re-elected.	▌ ✓ Mary Rose Oakar (Democratic); Uncontested
Ohio 21	Louis Stokes	Democratic	1968	Incumbent re-elected.	▌ ✓ Louis Stokes (Democratic) 88.2%; ▌Robert L. Woodall (Republican) 11.8%
Ohio 22	Charles Vanik	Democratic	1954	Incumbent retired. Democratic hold.	▌ ✓ Dennis E. Eckart (Democratic) 55.2%; ▌Joseph J. Nahra (Republican) 41.3%; ▌Arnold Gleisser (Independent) 3.5%
Ohio 23	Ronald M. Mottl	Democratic	1974	Incumbent re-elected.	▌ ✓ Ronald M. Mottl (Democratic); Uncontested

== Oklahoma ==
District	Incumbent			Results	Candidates
District	Member	Party	First elected	Results	Candidates
Oklahoma 1	James R. Jones	Democratic	1972	Incumbent re-elected.	▌ ✓ James R. Jones (Democratic) 58.4%; ▌Richard C. Freeman (Republican) 41.6%
Oklahoma 2	Mike Synar	Democratic	1978	Incumbent re-elected.	▌ ✓ Mike Synar (Democratic) 54.0%; ▌Gary Richardson (Republican) 46.0%
Oklahoma 3	Wes Watkins	Democratic	1976	Incumbent re-elected.	▌ ✓ Wes Watkins (Democratic); Uncontested
Oklahoma 4	Tom Steed	Democratic	1948	Incumbent retired. Democratic hold.	▌ ✓ Dave McCurdy (Democratic) 51.0%; ▌Howard Rutledge (Republican) 49.0%
Oklahoma 5	Mickey Edwards	Republican	1976	Incumbent re-elected.	▌ ✓ Mickey Edwards (Republican) 68.4%; ▌David Hood (Democratic) 28.0%; ▌James L. Rushing (Libertarian) 3.6%
Oklahoma 6	Glenn English	Democratic	1974	Incumbent re-elected.	▌ ✓ Glenn English (Democratic) 64.7%; ▌Carol McCurley (Republican) 35.3%

== Oregon ==
District	Incumbent			Results	Candidates
District	Member	Party	First elected	Results	Candidates
Oregon 1	Les AuCoin	Democratic	1974	Incumbent re-elected.	▌ ✓ Les AuCoin (Democratic) 66.0%; ▌Lynn Engdahl (Republican) 34.0%
Oregon 2	Albert C. Ullman	Democratic	1956	Incumbent lost re-election. Republican gain.	▌ ✓ Denny Smith (Republican) 48.8%; ▌Albert C. Ullman (Democratic) 47.5%; ▌Lloyd K. Marbet (Independent) 3.7%
Oregon 3	Robert B. Duncan	Democratic	1962; 1966 (retired); 1974	Incumbent lost renomination. Democratic hold.	▌ ✓ Ron Wyden (Democratic) 72.0%; ▌Darrell R. Conger (Republican) 28.0%
Oregon 4	Jim Weaver	Democratic	1974	Incumbent re-elected.	▌ ✓ Jim Weaver (Democratic) 54.8%; ▌Michael Fitzgerald (Republican) 45.2%

== Pennsylvania ==
District	Incumbent			Results	Candidates
District	Member	Party	First elected	Results	Candidates
Pennsylvania 1	Michael Myers	Democratic	1976	Incumbent lost re-election. Democratic hold.	▌ ✓ Thomas M. Foglietta (Independent) 37.8%; ▌Michael Myers (Democratic) 34.1%; ▌Robert R. Burke (Republican) 24.4%; ▌Geoffrey Steinberg (Libertarian) 2.0%; ▌Shaheed Abdul Haqq (Consumer) 1.7%
Pennsylvania 2	William H. Gray	Democratic	1978	Incumbent re-elected.	▌ ✓ William H. Gray (Democratic) 96.4%; ▌Garland Dempsey (Consumer) 1.8%; ▌James L. Buckman (Independent) 1.8%
Pennsylvania 3	Raymond Lederer	Democratic	1976	Incumbent re-elected.	▌ ✓ Raymond Lederer (Democratic) 54.5%; ▌William J. Phillips (Republican) 32.8%; ▌Max Weiner (Consumer) 9.5%; ▌John Morris (Independent) 3.2%
Pennsylvania 4	Charles F. Dougherty	Republican	1978	Incumbent re-elected.	▌ ✓ Charles F. Dougherty (Republican) 63.3%; ▌Thomas J. Magrann (Democratic) 36.7%
Pennsylvania 5	Dick Schulze	Republican	1974	Incumbent re-elected.	▌ ✓ Dick Schulze (Republican) 75.1%; ▌Grady G. Brickhouse (Democratic) 23.8%; ▌David F. Hoffman (Libertarian) 1.1%
Pennsylvania 6	Gus Yatron	Democratic	1968	Incumbent re-elected.	▌ ✓ Gus Yatron (Democratic) 67.1%; ▌George Hulshart (Republican) 32.9%
Pennsylvania 7	Bob Edgar	Democratic	1974	Incumbent re-elected.	▌ ✓ Bob Edgar (Democratic) 53.1%; ▌Dennis J. Rochford (Republican) 46.9%
Pennsylvania 8	Peter H. Kostmayer	Democratic	1976	Incumbent lost re-election. Republican gain.	▌ ✓ James K. Coyne III (Republican) 50.7%; ▌Peter H. Kostmayer (Democratic) 48.7%; ▌Hans Schroeder (Libertarian) 0.6%
Pennsylvania 9	Bud Shuster	Republican	1972	Incumbent re-elected.	▌ ✓ Bud Shuster (Republican); Uncontested
Pennsylvania 10	Joseph M. McDade	Republican	1962	Incumbent re-elected.	▌ ✓ Joseph M. McDade (Republican) 76.6%; ▌Gene Basalyga (Democratic) 22.7%; ▌Patrick Fallon (Libertarian) 0.8%
Pennsylvania 11	Ray Musto	Democratic	1980	Incumbent lost re-election. Republican gain.	▌ ✓ James Nelligan (Republican) 51.9%; ▌Ray Musto (Democratic) 48.1%
Pennsylvania 12	John Murtha	Democratic	1974	Incumbent re-elected.	▌ ✓ John Murtha (Democratic) 59.4%; ▌Charles A. Getty (Republican) 40.6%
Pennsylvania 13	Lawrence Coughlin	Republican	1968	Incumbent re-elected.	▌ ✓ Lawrence Coughlin (Republican) 70.0%; ▌Pete Slawek (Democratic) 29.2%; ▌Jon Houser (Libertarian) 0.8%
Pennsylvania 14	William S. Moorhead	Democratic	1958	Incumbent retired. Democratic hold.	▌ ✓ William J. Coyne (Democratic) 68.5%; ▌Stan Thomas (Republican) 29.5%; ▌Liz Hughes (Consumer) 2.0%
Pennsylvania 15	Donald L. Ritter	Republican	1978	Incumbent re-elected.	▌ ✓ Donald L. Ritter (Republican) 59.5%; ▌Jeanette Reibman (Democratic) 39.7%; ▌Barbara Karkutt (Libertarian) 0.7%
Pennsylvania 16	Bob Walker	Republican	1976	Incumbent re-elected.	▌ ✓ Bob Walker (Republican) 76.9%; ▌James A. Woodcock (Democratic) 23.1%
Pennsylvania 17	Allen E. Ertel	Democratic	1976	Incumbent re-elected.	▌ ✓ Allen E. Ertel (Democratic) 60.6%; ▌Daniel L. Seiverling (Republican) 39.4%
Pennsylvania 18	Doug Walgren	Democratic	1976	Incumbent re-elected.	▌ ✓ Doug Walgren (Democratic) 68.5%; ▌Steven R. Snyder (Republican) 31.5%
Pennsylvania 19	William F. Goodling	Republican	1974	Incumbent re-elected.	▌ ✓ William F. Goodling (Republican) 76.0%; ▌Richard P. Noll (Democratic) 23.1%; ▌Daniel R. Davies (Libertarian) 0.9%
Pennsylvania 20	Joseph M. Gaydos	Democratic	1968	Incumbent re-elected.	▌ ✓ Joseph M. Gaydos (Democratic) 72.5%; ▌Kathleen M. Meyer (Republican) 27.5%
Pennsylvania 21	Donald A. Bailey	Democratic	1978	Incumbent re-elected.	▌ ✓ Donald A. Bailey (Democratic) 68.4%; ▌Dirk Matson (Republican) 31.6%
Pennsylvania 22	Austin Murphy	Democratic	1976	Incumbent re-elected.	▌ ✓ Austin Murphy (Democratic) 69.6%; ▌Marilyn Coyle Ecoff (Republican) 29.5%; ▌William L. Krayer (Libertarian) 1.0%
Pennsylvania 23	William Clinger	Republican	1978	Incumbent re-elected.	▌ ✓ William Clinger (Republican) 73.5%; ▌Peter Atigan (Democratic) 24.6%; ▌Douglas M. Mason (Consumer) 1.9%
Pennsylvania 24	Marc L. Marks	Republican	1976	Incumbent re-elected.	▌ ✓ Marc L. Marks (Republican) 49.7%; ▌David C. DiCarlo (Democratic) 49.6%; ▌Edward J. Hammer (Independent) 0.7%
Pennsylvania 25	Eugene Atkinson	Democratic	1978	Incumbent re-elected.	▌ ✓ Eugene Atkinson (Democratic) 67.1%; ▌Robert Morris (Republican) 32.9%

== Puerto Rico ==
See Non-voting delegates, below.

== Rhode Island ==
District	Incumbent			Results	Candidates
District	Member	Party	First elected	Results	Candidates
Rhode Island 1	Fernand St Germain	Democratic	1960	Incumbent re-elected.	▌ ✓ Fernand St Germain (Democratic) 67.6%; ▌William P. Montgomery (Republican) 32.4%
Rhode Island 2	Edward Beard	Democratic	1974	Incumbent lost re-election. Republican gain.	▌ ✓ Claudine Schneider (Republican) 55.3%; ▌Edward Beard (Democratic) 44.7%

== South Carolina ==
District	Incumbent			Results	Candidates
District	Member	Party	First elected	Results	Candidates
South Carolina 1	Mendel Jackson Davis	Democratic	1971 (special)	Incumbent retired. Republican gain.	▌ ✓ Thomas F. Hartnett (Republican) 51.7%; ▌Charles D. Ravenel (Democratic) 48.3%
South Carolina 2	Floyd Spence	Republican	1970	Incumbent re-elected.	▌ ✓ Floyd Spence (Republican) 55.7%; ▌Tom Turnipseed (Democratic) 44.3%
South Carolina 3	Butler Derrick	Democratic	1974	Incumbent re-elected.	▌ ✓ Butler Derrick (Democratic) 59.8%; ▌Marshall Parker (Republican) 39.4%; ▌Boyce Lee Muller (Libertarian) 0.8%
South Carolina 4	Carroll A. Campbell Jr.	Republican	1978	Incumbent re-elected.	▌ ✓ Carroll A. Campbell Jr. (Republican) 92.9%; ▌Thomas P. Waldenfels (Libertarian) 7.1%
South Carolina 5	Kenneth Lamar Holland	Democratic	1974	Incumbent re-elected.	▌ ✓ Kenneth Lamar Holland (Democratic) 87.5%; ▌Thomas Campbell (Libertarian) 12.5%
South Carolina 6	John Jenrette	Democratic	1974	Incumbent lost re-election. Republican gain.	▌ ✓ John Light Napier (Republican) 51.8%; ▌John Jenrette (Democratic) 48.2%

== South Dakota ==
District	Incumbent			Results	Candidates
District	Member	Party	First elected	Results	Candidates
South Dakota 1	Tom Daschle	Democratic	1978	Incumbent re-elected.	▌ ✓ Tom Daschle (Democratic) 65.8%; ▌Bart Kull (Republican) 34.2%
South Dakota 2	James Abdnor	Republican	1972	Incumbent retired to run for U.S. Senator. Republican hold.	▌ ✓ Clint Roberts (Republican) 58.4%; ▌Kenneth D. Stofferahn (Democratic) 41.6%

== Tennessee ==
District	Incumbent			Results	Candidates
District	Member	Party	First elected	Results	Candidates
Tennessee 1	Jimmy Quillen	Republican	1962	Incumbent re-elected.	▌ ✓ Jimmy Quillen (Republican) 86.2%; ▌John Curtis (Independent) 13.8%
Tennessee 2	John Duncan Sr.	Republican	1964	Incumbent re-elected.	▌ ✓ John Duncan Sr. (Republican) 76.1%; ▌David H. Dunnaway (Democratic) 23.9%
Tennessee 3	Marilyn Lloyd	Democratic	1974	Incumbent re-elected.	▌ ✓ Marilyn Lloyd (Democratic) 61.1%; ▌Glen Byers (Republican) 38.9%
Tennessee 4	Al Gore	Democratic	1976	Incumbent re-elected.	▌ ✓ Al Gore (Democratic) 79.3%; ▌James Beau Seigneur (Republican) 20.7%
Tennessee 5	Bill Boner	Democratic	1978	Incumbent re-elected.	▌ ✓ Bill Boner (Democratic) 65.4%; ▌Mike Adams (Republican) 34.6%
Tennessee 6	Robin Beard	Republican	1972	Incumbent re-elected.	▌ ✓ Robin Beard (Republican); Uncontested
Tennessee 7	Ed Jones	Democratic	1969 (special)	Incumbent re-elected.	▌ ✓ Ed Jones (Democratic) 77.3%; ▌Daniel Campbell (Republican) 22.7%
Tennessee 8	Harold Ford Sr.	Democratic	1974	Incumbent re-elected.	▌ ✓ Harold Ford Sr. (Democratic); Uncontested

== Texas ==
District	Incumbent			Results	Candidates
District	Member	Party	First elected	Results	Candidates
Texas 1	Sam B. Hall Jr.	Democratic	1976	Incumbent re-elected.	▌ ✓ Sam B. Hall Jr. (Democratic); Uncontested
Texas 2	Charles Wilson	Democratic	1972	Incumbent re-elected.	▌ ✓ Charles Wilson (Democratic) 69.3%; ▌F. H. Pannill (Republican) 29.5%; ▌Martin Sorrells (Libertarian) 1.2%
Texas 3	James M. Collins	Republican	1968	Incumbent re-elected.	▌ ✓ James M. Collins (Republican) 79.3%; ▌Earle Stephen Porter (Democratic) 18.0%; ▌William Stephen Briggs (Libertarian) 2.7%
Texas 4	Ray Roberts	Democratic	1962	Incumbent retired. Democratic hold.	▌ ✓ Ralph Hall (Democratic) 52.3%; ▌John Wright (Republican) 47.7%
Texas 5	Jim Mattox	Democratic	1976	Incumbent re-elected.	▌ ✓ Jim Mattox (Democratic) 51.1%; ▌Tom Pauken (Republican) 48.9%
Texas 6	Phil Gramm	Democratic	1978	Incumbent re-elected.	▌ ✓ Phil Gramm (Democratic) 70.9%; ▌Dave Haskins (Republican) 29.1%
Texas 7	Bill Archer	Republican	1970	Incumbent re-elected.	▌ ✓ Bill Archer (Republican) 82.1%; ▌Robert L. Hutchings (Democratic) 16.4%; ▌Bill Ware (Libertarian) 1.4%
Texas 8	Bob Eckhardt	Democratic	1966	Incumbent lost re-election. Republican gain.	▌ ✓ Jack Fields (Republican) 51.8%; ▌Bob Eckhardt (Democratic) 48.2%
Texas 9	Jack Brooks	Democratic	1952	Incumbent re-elected.	▌ ✓ Jack Brooks (Democratic); Uncontested
Texas 10	J. J. Pickle	Democratic	1963 (special)	Incumbent re-elected.	▌ ✓ J. J. Pickle (Democratic) 59.1%; ▌John Biggar (Republican) 38.8%; ▌Michael Grossberg (Libertarian) 2.1%
Texas 11	Marvin Leath	Democratic	1978	Incumbent re-elected.	▌ ✓ Marvin Leath (Democratic); Uncontested
Texas 12	Jim Wright	Democratic	1954	Incumbent re-elected.	▌ ✓ Jim Wright (Democratic) 59.9%; ▌Jim Bradshaw (Republican) 39.3%; ▌C. B. Mauldin (Libertarian) 0.8%
Texas 13	Jack Hightower	Democratic	1974	Incumbent re-elected.	▌ ✓ Jack Hightower (Democratic) 55.0%; ▌Ron Slover (Republican) 45.0%
Texas 14	Joseph P. Wyatt Jr.	Democratic	1978	Incumbent retired. Democratic hold.	▌ ✓ Bill Patman (Democratic) 56.8%; ▌C. L. Concklin (Republican) 43.2%
Texas 15	Kika de la Garza	Democratic	1964	Incumbent re-elected.	▌ ✓ Kika de la Garza (Democratic) 70.0%; ▌Robert Lendol McDonald (Republican) 30.0%
Texas 16	Richard C. White	Democratic	1964	Incumbent re-elected.	▌ ✓ Richard C. White (Democratic) 84.6%; ▌Catherine A. McDivitt (Libertarian) 15.4%
Texas 17	Charles Stenholm	Democratic	1978	Incumbent re-elected.	▌ ✓ Charles Stenholm (Democratic); Uncontested
Texas 18	Mickey Leland	Democratic	1978	Incumbent re-elected.	▌ ✓ Mickey Leland (Democratic) 79.9%; ▌C. L. Kennedy (Republican) 17.9%; ▌Bill Fraser (Libertarian) 2.2%
Texas 19	Kent Hance	Democratic	1978	Incumbent re-elected.	▌ ✓ Kent Hance (Democratic) 93.5%; ▌J. D. Webster (Libertarian) 6.5%
Texas 20	Henry B. González	Democratic	1961 (special)	Incumbent re-elected.	▌ ✓ Henry B. González (Democratic) 81.9%; ▌Merle Nash (Republican) 17.3%; ▌Tom Burnham (Libertarian) 0.8%
Texas 21	Tom Loeffler	Republican	1978	Incumbent re-elected.	▌ ✓ Tom Loeffler (Republican) 76.5%; ▌Joe Sullivan (Democratic) 22.8%; ▌William Rice (Libertarian) 0.7%
Texas 22	Ron Paul	Republican	1976 (special); 1976 (lost); 1978	Incumbent re-elected.	▌ ✓ Ron Paul (Republican) 51.0%; ▌Michael A. Andrews (Democratic) 48.3%; ▌Vaudie V. Nance (Independent) 0.6%
Texas 23	Abraham Kazen	Democratic	1966	Incumbent re-elected.	▌ ✓ Abraham Kazen (Democratic) 69.9%; ▌Bobby A. Locke (Republican) 30.1%
Texas 24	Martin Frost	Democratic	1978	Incumbent re-elected.	▌ ✓ Martin Frost (Democratic) 61.3%; ▌Clay Smothers (Republican) 38.7%

== U.S. Virgin Islands ==
See Non-voting delegates, below.

== Utah ==
District	Incumbent			Results	Candidates
District	Member	Party	First elected	Results	Candidates
Utah 1	K. Gunn McKay	Democratic	1970	Incumbent lost re-election. Republican gain.	▌ ✓ James V. Hansen (Republican) 52.1%; ▌K. Gunn McKay (Democratic) 47.9%
Utah 2	David Daniel Marriott	Republican	1976	Incumbent re-elected.	▌ ✓ David Daniel Marriott (Republican) 67.0%; ▌Arthur L. Monson (Democratic) 30.3%; ▌Stan Larsen (Independent) 1.9%; ▌Steven Ray Montgomery (American) 0.5%; ▌David P. Hurst (Socialist Workers) 0.3%

== Vermont ==
District	Incumbent			Results	Candidates
District	Member	Party	First elected	Results	Candidates
Vermont at-large	Jim Jeffords	Republican	1974	Incumbent re-elected.	▌ ✓ Jim Jeffords (Republican) 75.3%; ▌Robin Lloyd (Citizens) 19.3%; ▌Peter Diamondstone (Liberty Union) 5.4%

== Virginia ==
District	Incumbent			Results	Candidates
District	Member	Party	First elected	Results	Candidates
Virginia 1	Paul S. Trible Jr.	Republican	1976	Incumbent re-elected.	▌ ✓ Paul S. Trible Jr. (Republican) 90.5%; ▌Sharon D. Grant (Independent) 9.5%
Virginia 2	G. William Whitehurst	Republican	1968	Incumbent re-elected.	▌ ✓ G. William Whitehurst (Republican) 89.8%; ▌Kenneth P. Morrison (Independent) 10.2%
Virginia 3	David E. Satterfield III	Democratic	1964	Incumbent retired. Republican gain.	▌ ✓ Thomas J. Bliley Jr. (Republican) 51.6%; ▌John A. Mapp (Democratic) 32.6%; ▌Howard H. Carwile (Independent) 10.5%; ▌James B. Turney (Independent) 5.3%
Virginia 4	Robert Daniel	Republican	1972	Incumbent re-elected.	▌ ✓ Robert Daniel (Republican) 60.7%; ▌Cecil Y. Jenkins (Democratic) 39.3%
Virginia 5	Dan Daniel	Democratic	1968	Incumbent re-elected.	▌ ✓ Dan Daniel (Democratic); Uncontested
Virginia 6	M. Caldwell Butler	Republican	1972	Incumbent re-elected.	▌ ✓ M. Caldwell Butler (Republican); Uncontested
Virginia 7	J. Kenneth Robinson	Republican	1970	Incumbent re-elected.	▌ ✓ J. Kenneth Robinson (Republican); Uncontested
Virginia 8	Herbert Harris	Democratic	1974	Incumbent lost re-election. Republican gain.	▌ ✓ Stanford Parris (Republican) 48.8%; ▌Herbert Harris (Democratic) 48.3%; ▌Deborah L. Frantz (Independent) 2.9%
Virginia 9	William C. Wampler	Republican	1952; 1954 (lost); 1966	Incumbent re-elected.	▌ ✓ William C. Wampler (Republican) 69.4%; ▌Roosevelt Ferguson (Democratic) 30.6%
Virginia 10	Joseph L. Fisher	Democratic	1974	Incumbent lost re-election. Republican gain.	▌ ✓ Frank Wolf (Republican) 51.1%; ▌Joseph L. Fisher (Democratic) 48.9%

== Washington ==
District	Incumbent			Results	Candidates
District	Member	Party	First elected	Results	Candidates
Washington 1	Joel Pritchard	Republican	1972	Incumbent re-elected.	▌ ✓ Joel Pritchard (Republican) 78.3%; ▌Robin Drake (Democratic) 18.1%; ▌Maurice Willey (Libertarian) 3.6%
Washington 2	Al Swift	Democratic	1978	Incumbent re-elected.	▌ ✓ Al Swift (Democratic) 63.9%; ▌Neal Snider (Republican) 32.6%; ▌William L. McCord (Libertarian) 3.6%
Washington 3	Don Bonker	Democratic	1974	Incumbent re-elected.	▌ ✓ Don Bonker (Democratic) 62.7%; ▌Rod Culp (Republican) 37.3%
Washington 4	Mike McCormack	Democratic	1970	Incumbent lost re-election. Republican gain.	▌ ✓ Sid Morrison (Republican) 57.4%; ▌Mike McCormack (Democratic) 42.6%
Washington 5	Tom Foley	Democratic	1964	Incumbent re-elected.	▌ ✓ Tom Foley (Democratic) 51.9%; ▌John Sonneland (Republican) 48.1%
Washington 6	Norman D. Dicks	Democratic	1976	Incumbent re-elected.	▌ ✓ Norman D. Dicks (Democratic) 53.6%; ▌James Edward Beaver (Republican) 46.4%
Washington 7	Mike Lowry	Democratic	1978	Incumbent re-elected.	▌ ✓ Mike Lowry (Democratic) 57.3%; ▌Ron Dunlap (Republican) 42.7%

== West Virginia ==
District	Incumbent			Results	Candidates
District	Member	Party	First elected	Results	Candidates
West Virginia 1	Bob Mollohan	Democratic	1952; 1956 (retired); 1968	Incumbent re-elected.	▌ ✓ Bob Mollohan (Democratic) 63.6%; ▌Joe Bartler (Republican) 36.4%
West Virginia 2	Harley O. Staggers	Democratic	1948	Incumbent retired. Republican gain.	▌ ✓ Cleve Benedict (Republican) 55.9%; ▌Pat R. Hamilton (Democratic) 44.1%
West Virginia 3	John G. Hutchinson	Democratic	1980	Incumbent lost re-election. Republican gain.	▌ ✓ Mick Staton (Republican) 52.7%; ▌John G. Hutchinson (Democratic) 47.3%
West Virginia 4	Nick Rahall	Democratic	1976	Incumbent re-elected.	▌ ✓ Nick Rahall (Democratic) 76.6%; ▌Winton Guy Covey Jr. (Republican) 23.4%

== Wisconsin ==
District	Incumbent			Results	Candidates
District	Member	Party	First elected	Results	Candidates
Wisconsin 1	Les Aspin	Democratic	1970	Incumbent re-elected.	▌ ✓ Les Aspin (Democratic) 56.2%; ▌Kathryn H. Canary (Republican) 42.8%; ▌Arthur F. Jackson (Libertarian) 1.0%
Wisconsin 2	Robert Kastenmeier	Democratic	1958	Incumbent re-elected.	▌ ✓ Robert Kastenmeier (Democratic) 54.0%; ▌James A. Wright (Republican) 45.4%; ▌Leslie Graves Key (Libertarian) 0.6%
Wisconsin 3	Alvin Baldus	Democratic	1974	Incumbent lost re-election. Republican gain.	▌ ✓ Steve Gunderson (Republican) 51.0%; ▌Alvin Baldus (Democratic) 49.0%
Wisconsin 4	Clement J. Zablocki	Democratic	1948	Incumbent re-elected.	▌ ✓ Clement J. Zablocki (Democratic) 70.0%; ▌Elroy C. Honadel (Republican) 29.2%; ▌Lynn Rashkind (Independent) 0.8%
Wisconsin 5	Henry S. Reuss	Democratic	1954	Incumbent re-elected.	▌ ✓ Henry S. Reuss (Democratic) 77.0%; ▌David Bathke (Republican) 22.2%; ▌Frank Forrestal (Independent) 0.8%
Wisconsin 6	Tom Petri	Republican	1979 (special)	Incumbent re-elected.	▌ ✓ Tom Petri (Republican) 59.3%; ▌Gary R. Goyke (Democratic) 40.7%
Wisconsin 7	Dave Obey	Democratic	1969 (special)	Incumbent re-elected.	▌ ✓ Dave Obey (Democratic) 64.7%; ▌Vinton A. Vesta (Republican) 35.3%
Wisconsin 8	Toby Roth	Republican	1978	Incumbent re-elected.	▌ ✓ Toby Roth (Republican) 67.7%; ▌Michael Monfils (Democratic) 32.3%
Wisconsin 9	Jim Sensenbrenner	Republican	1978	Incumbent re-elected.	▌ ✓ Jim Sensenbrenner (Republican) 78.4%; ▌Gary C. Benedict (Democratic) 21.6%

== Wyoming ==
District	Incumbent			Results	Candidates
District	Member	Party	First elected	Results	Candidates
Wyoming at-large	Dick Cheney	Republican	1978	Incumbent re-elected.	▌ ✓ Dick Cheney (Republican) 68.6%; ▌Jim Rogers (Democratic) 31.4%

== Non-voting delegates ==
Each non-voting delegate was up for reelection in 1980.

District	Incumbent			This race	
District	Delegate	Party	First elected	Results	Candidates
American Samoa at-large	None. Position created.			New member elected. Democratic gain	General Election (November 4th); ▌ Fono I. F. Sunia (Independent Democrat) 43.8%; ▌ Eni Fa'aua'a Hunkin, Jr. (Independent) 38.0%; ▌ I.S. Mulitauaopele (Democratic) 18.2%; Runoff Election (November 18th); ▌ ✓ Fono I. F. Sunia (Independent Democrat) 59.0%; ▌ Eni Fa'aua'a Hunkin, Jr. (Independent) 41.0%
District of Columbia at-large	Walter Fauntroy	Democratic	1971	Incumbent re-elected.	▌ ✓ Walter Fauntroy (Democratic) 74.4%; ▌ Robert J. Roehr (Republican) 14.1%; ▌ Josephine D. Butler (D.C. Statehood) 9.6%; ▌ Write-in 1.9%
Guam at-large	Antonio Borja Won Pat	Democratic	1972	Incumbent re-elected	▌ ✓ Antonio Borja Won Pat (Democratic) 58.2%; ▌ Antonio M. Palomo (Republican) 41.8%
Puerto Rico at-large	Baltasar Corrada del Río	New Progressive	1976	Incumbent re-elected	▌ ✓ Baltasar Corrada del Río (PNP) 47.7%; ▌ ✓ Jose Arsenio Torres (PPD) 47.0%; ▌ Marta Font Calero (PIP) 5.3%
U.S. Virgin Islands at-large	Melvin H. Evans	Republican	1978	Incumbent lost re-election. Democratic gain.	▌ ✓ Ron de Lugo (Democratic) 53.0%; ▌ Melvin H. Evans (Republican) 47.0%

== See also ==
- 1980 United States elections
  - 1980 United States gubernatorial elections
  - 1980 United States presidential election
  - 1980 United States Senate elections
- 96th United States Congress
- 97th United States Congress

== Works cited ==
- Abramson, Paul; Aldrich, John; Rohde, David (1995). Change and Continuity in the 1992 Elections. CQ Press. ISBN 0871878399.
