= Harold L. Silverman =

American politician

Harold L. Silverman (born March 1, 1934) is an American politician from Maine. Silverman represented Calais in the Maine House of Representatives from 1973 to 1976 as a Republican. He resigned from that seat in May 1976, approximately 6 months prior to the general election, to become a staffer for independent governor James B. Longley. He was elected as an independent to one term (1979–1980) in the Maine Senate, representing a portion of Washington County. He was the first independent State Senator in over 100 years.

In 1980, Silverman sought the Democratic Party's nomination for Maine's 2nd congressional district. He kicked off his campaign in Lewiston, Maine's Carpenters Union Hall in March 1980. He eventually won the nomination but was defeated by incumbent Republican Olympia Snowe. He earned 21.49% of the vote.

Silverman traveled to Israel each year to work on a kibbutz.
