= Sheila Suess Kennedy =

American Academic

- Born: October 20, 1941 (age 85); Indianapolis, IN
- Education: Associate of Arts Degree, from Stephens College for Women, 1960 Bachelor of Science Degree in Education, with Honors, from Indiana University, 1964 Juris Doctor, cum laude, IU School of Law, 1975
- Spouse: Robert E. Suess (1964-1977) Robert N. Kennedy (1980)
- Children: 3
- Parent(s): Joseph S. and Annette Simkin
- Website: https://sheilakennedy.net/

Sheila Suess Kennedy is a Jewish American scholar of law and public policy. She is active in Indianapolis' local Jewish community and political scene.

== Early life and education ==
Kennedy was born to Joseph and Annette Simkin in Indianapolis in 1941.

Kennedy attended Stephens College of Women, obtaining an Associate of Arts degree in 1960. She then attended Indiana University, where she graduated as Bachelor of Science in 1964 followed by Juris Doctor in 1975.

She married her first husband, Robert Suess, in 1964 and remained with him until their divorce in 1977. She has three children, Michael, Stephen and David Suess, all with her first husband. She married her second husband, Robert Kennedy, in 1980.

== Career ==
Kennedy worked for Baker & Daniels from 1975 to 1977. She then moved on to working for the city of Indianapolis in the Office of Corporation Counsel, providing legal services until 1980.

Kennedy served as the Republican Candidate for Indiana's 11th Congressional District seat. She moved back into law, serving as a partner for the Mears, Crawford, Kennedy & Eichholtz law firm from 1980 to 1986. In 1987, she served as the president of a real estate company called "Kennedy Development Services", until 1992, when she began serving as executive director for Indiana Civil Liberties Union.

Starting in 1996, Kennedy worked as an adjunct professor at Indiana University School of Public and Environmental Affairs. After serving as executive director of the Indiana Civil Liberties Union from 1992 to 1998, she returned to Indiana University as an assistant professor of law and public policy in August 1998. She remained there until her retirement in December 2020, when she became an emerita professor. Her job description changed multiple times, from professor to faculty to fellow. Beginning in 2005, Kennedy began her work as a journalist for Common Ground, a networking magazine based in San Francisco.

== Selected works ==
- Kennedy, Sheila (1997). What's a Nice Republican Girl Like Me Doing in the ACLU?. Prometheus. ISBN 9781573921435.
- Kennedy, Sheila (1999). Free Expression in America: A Documentary History. Greenwood. ISBN 9780313302411.
- Kennedy, Sheila; Ritchie, Ingrid, eds. (2001). To Market, To Market: Reinventing Indianapolis. University Press of America. ISBN 9780761819813.
- Kennedy, Sheila (July 7, 2003). "Tilting the Level Playing Field: Public Administration Meets Legal Theory". Journal of Law and Policy. 11 (2): 495–523 – via BrooklynWorks.
- Kennedy, Sheila; Bielefeld, Wolfgang, eds. (2006). Charitable Choice at Work: Evaluating Faith-Based Job Programs in the States. Georgetown University Press. ISBN 9781589012950.
- Kennedy, Sheila (2007). God and Country: America in Red and Blue. Baylor University Press. ISBN 9781932792997.
- Kennedy, Sheila (2009). Distrust American Style: Diversity and the Crisis of Public Confidence. Prometheus. ISBN 9781615923847.
- Kennedy, Sheila; Schultz, David, eds. (2010). American Public Service: Constitutional and Ethical Foundations. Jones & Bartlett Learning. ISBN 9781449662424.
- Kennedy, Sheila (2016). Talking Politics? What You Need to Know before Opening Your Mouth. Georgetown University Press. ISBN 9781626163782.
- Kennedy, Sheila (2019). Living Together: Mending a Fractured America. Independently published. ISBN 9781089303299.
- Kennedy, Sheila (2023). From Property to Partner: Women's Progress and Political Resistance. Independently published. ISBN 9798391360278.
