= Charles Phelps =

Charles Phelps may refer to:

- Charles Phelps (politician) (1852–1940), American attorney, politician, and the first Connecticut attorney general
- Charles E. Phelps (1833–1908), American Civil War general and congressman
- Charles E. Phelps (professor), provost of the University of Rochester
- Charles D. Phelps (1937–1985), American physician
- Charles A. Phelps (1820–1902), American physician, diplomat, and politician
- Chuck Phelps, American Baptist pastor
- Chuck Phelps (drummer), of ska band Skankin' Pickle
- Charles Phelps (given name)
- USS Charles Phelps, a ship acquired by the Union Navy during the American Civil War
