= Armaly =

Armaly is a surname. Notable people with the surname include:

- Mansour F. Armaly, (1927–2005), Palestinian physician
- Fareed Armaly (born 1957), American artist, curator, editor, and author
