= Shefa-Amr =

Arab city in northern Israel

Shefa-Amr: שפרעם; شفاعمرو
- City

Hebrew transcription(s)
  - ISO 259: Šparˁam
  - English Official: Shefar'am
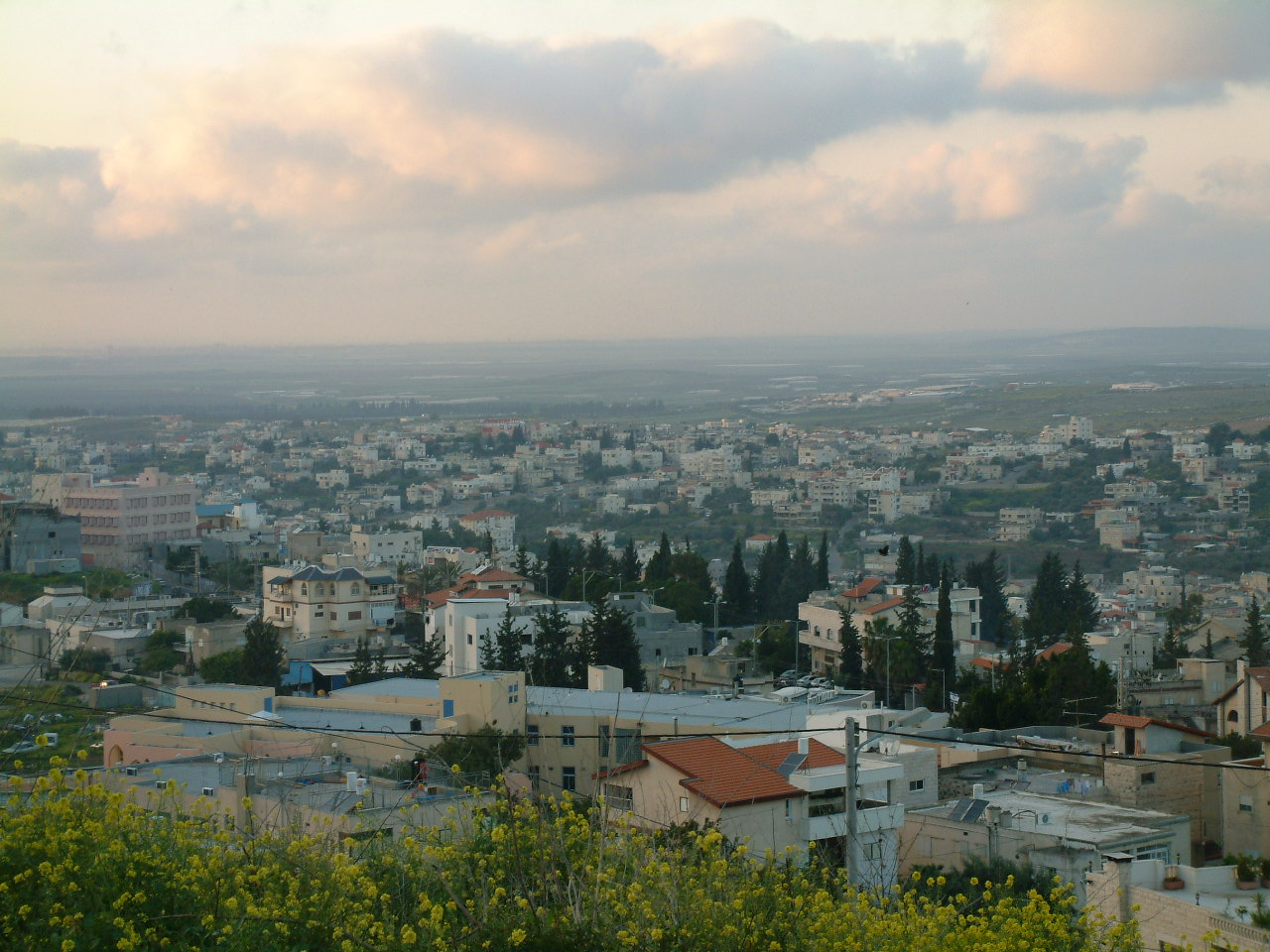
- View of Shefa-Amr

- Location within Northwest Israel Location within Israel
- Coordinates: 32°48′20″N 35°10′10″E
- Grid position: 166/245 PAL
- Country: Israel
- District: Northern
- Subdistrict: Acre
- Natural Region: Shefar'am
- Founded: Bronze age

Government
  - Mayor: Nahid Khazem (from March, 2024)

Area
  - Total: 19,766 dunams (19.766 km^{2}; 7.632 sq mi)

Population (2024)
  - Total: 43,858
  - Density: 2,218.9/km^{2} (5,746.8/sq mi)
- Website: www.shefaram.muni.il

Shefa-Amr or Shefar'am (Arabic: شفاعمرو, romanized: Šafāʻamru; Hebrew: שְׁפַרְעָם, romanized: Šəfarʻam) is an Arab city in the Northern District of Israel. In 2024 it had a population of 43,858 with a Sunni Muslim majority and large Christian Arab and Druze minorities.

== Etymology ==
Palmer writes that the name meant: "The margin or edge of 'Amr. Locally and erroneously supposed to mean the healing of 'Amer (ed Dhaher)." The city is identified with Shefar'am, an ancient Jewish town of great significance during Talmudic times. Some have proposed that its original meaning may be linked to the Hebrew words "Shefer" (שֶׁפֶר), signifying something nice, beautiful or good, and "'Am", (עַם) which translates to people.

== History ==
=== Ancient period ===
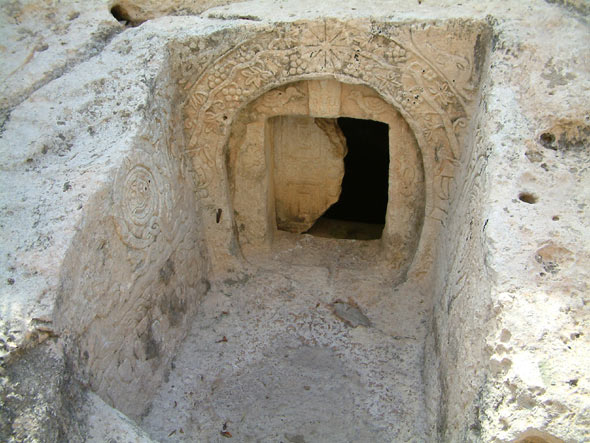
Christian Byzantine graves, 5th and 6th century CE.

Walls, installations and pottery sherds from the Early Bronze Age IB and the Middle Bronze Age IIB, Iron, Hellenistic and Roman periods have been excavated at Shefa-ʻAmr.

Shefa-Amr is first mentioned under the name Shefar'am (Hebrew: שפרעם) in the Tosefta (Tractate Mikvaot 6:1), followed by the Talmud redacted in 500 CE where it is mentioned in several places, in Tractate Avodah Zarah 8b and Rosh Hashanah 31b, et al.

Settlement has existed there without interruption since the Roman period, when it was one of the cities mentioned in the Talmud as containing the seat of the Jewish Sanhedrin during the reign of Marcus Aurelius. The seat of the Sanhedrin was traditionally thought to be where the Old Synagogue "Maḥaneh Shekhinah" was built in later times. Old Shefa-'Amr was settled in the area where are now built the Police Station, the various Churches and Jews' Street. Decorated burial caves were documented by the Survey of Western Palestine in the late nineteenth century; they were found to be Christian tombs from the Byzantine era, dating to the 5th and 6th century CE. Greek inscriptions were also found.

Archaeological excavations of a cave and quarries revealed that they were used in the Roman and Byzantine eras. Shefa-ʻAmr contains Byzantine remains, including a church and tombs.

A salvage dig was conducted in the southern quarter of the old city exposing remains from five phases in the Late Byzantine and early Umayyad periods. Finds include a tabun oven, a pavement of small fieldstones, a mosaic pavement that was probably part of a wine press treading floor, a small square wine press, handmade kraters, an imported Cypriot bowl and an open cooking pot. Also discovered were glass and pottery vessels.

=== Middle Ages ===
Under the Crusaders the place was known as "Safran", "Sapharanum", "Castrum Zafetanum", "Saphar castrum" or "Cafram". The Crusaders built a fortress, used by the Knights Templar, in the village. At the foot of the castle was a fortified settlement with a church, inhabited either by local Christians or Crusaders. The village, then called "Shafar 'Am", was used by Muslim leader Saladin between 1190–91 and 1193-94 as a military base for attacks on Acre.

By 1229, the place was back in Crusader hands; this was confirmed by Sultan Baybars in the peace treaty of 1271, and by Sultan Qalawun in 1283. Italian monk Riccoldo da Monte di Croce visited the village in 1287–88, and noted that it had Christian inhabitants. It apparently was under Mamluk control by 1291, as it was mentioned in that year when sultan al-Ashraf Khalil allocated the town's income to a waqf (endowment) in Cairo.

=== Ottoman period ===
==== Early Ottoman period ====
The region became part of the Ottoman Empire in 1517. In the Ottoman tax census of 1525–26, Shefa-Amr had a population of 150, 90% of whom were Muslims and 10% Jews. The population increased to 388 in the 1538–39 census, with Jews constituting 13% of the inhabitants. According to the records of 1547–48 and 1555–56, Shefa-Amr had a population 423 and 594 respectively, all Muslims. In 1564, the revenues of the village of Shefa-Amr were designated for the new waqf (endowment) of Hasseki Sultan Imaret in Jerusalem, established by Hasseki Hurrem Sultan (Roxelana), the wife of Sultan Suleiman the Magnificent.

In the census of c. 1572, the village had a population of 510 Muslims. A 1573 firman (decree) mentioned that Shefa-Amr was among a group of villages in the nahiya (sub district) of Acre in rebellion against the state. By 1577, the village had accumulated an arsenal of 200 muskets. In the 1596 tax records, Shefa-Amr was part of the nahiya of Acre, part of Safed Sanjak, with a population of 83 households (khana), and eight bachelors, all Muslims. The total revenue was 13,600 akçe, most of which was given in fixed amounts. The taxable produce also comprised occasional revenues, goats and beehives, and the inhabitants paid for the use or ownership of an olive oil press.

==== Zaydani period ====
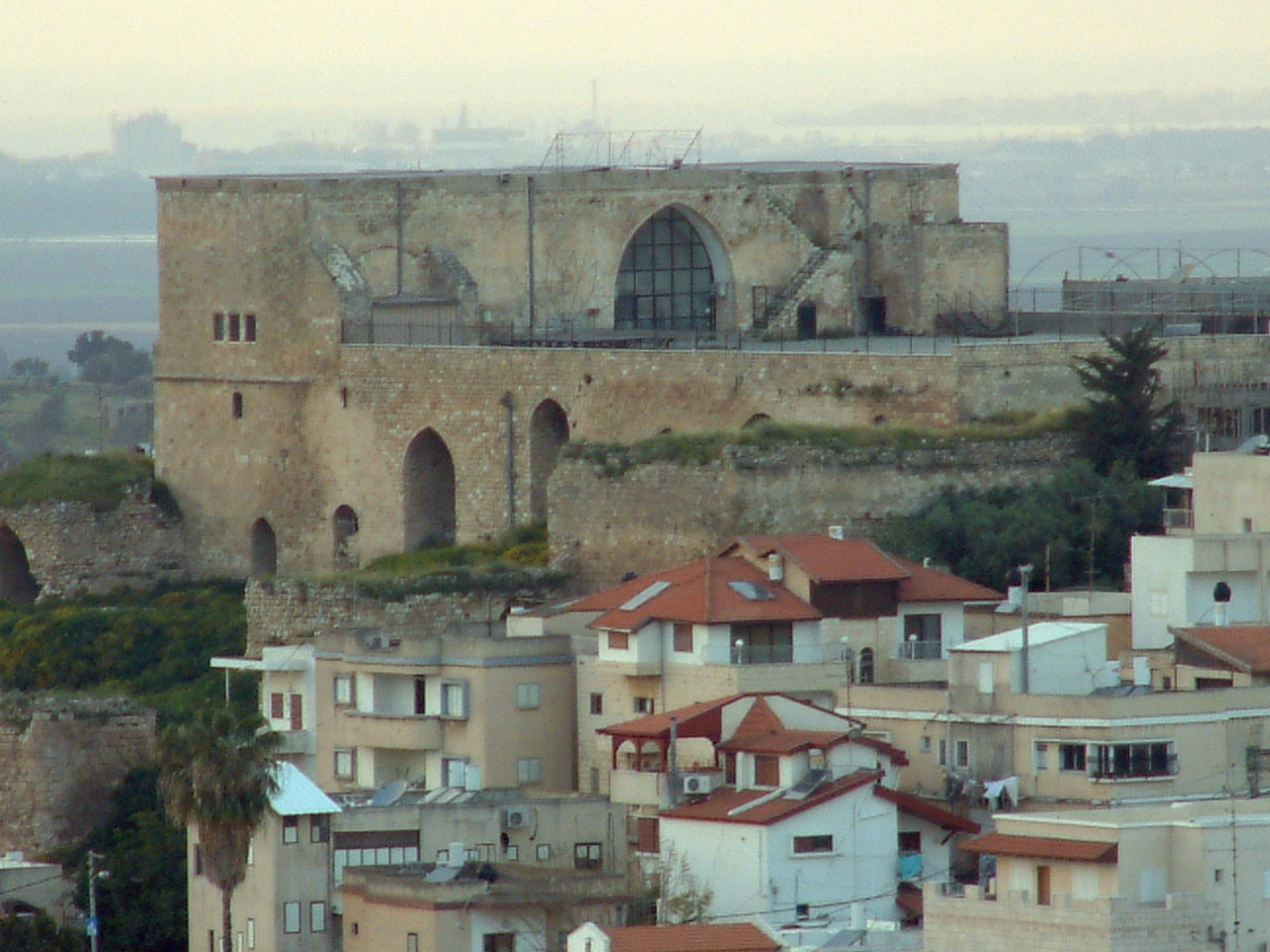
The Zaydani fort

During the 18th century Shefa-Amr was the center of its own muqata'a (fiscal district) in the province of Sidon. Its importance derived from its position in the heart of the Galilee's cotton-growing area and its natural and man-made defenses. The significance of cotton to the growth of Shefa-Amr was fundamental. Tax returns for the village attest to the large returns expected of this crop. Its local prominence was headed by the sheikhs of the Zayadina (sing. Zaydani), a local family of multazims (tax farmers), in charge of collecting taxes for the governor of Sidon. As early as 1704, the village was held as a tax farm by the Zaydani sheikh Ali ibn Salih, along with other villages in the Lower Galilee. At an unknown point after, the Zayadina lost Shefa-Amr but Ali's son Muhammad of al-Damun had regained control of it by c. 1740, during a period when the Zayadina were expanding their holdings across the Galilee under the leadership of Daher al-Umar (Muhammad's first cousin).

It is known that there was a castle in the village by this time, suggesting it was originally founded by Daher's uncle Ali ibn Salih. Its fortifications were strengthened by the Zayadina in c. 1742 during a respite in the sieges of the Zaydani stronghold of Tiberias by the governor of Damascus. Afterward, in 1743, Muhammad was arrested and executed by Daher's order to remove him as an obstacle to Daher's regional ambitions. Giovanni Mariti visited the village in 1761 and noted that Daher had appointed a member of one of its leading Christian families as the sheikh of Shefa-Amr, subleasing its tax farm to him. It was "very populous" and most of the inhabitants were Greek Catholics. Its cotton was still considered the region's best and was marketed to the merchants of Acre.

At another point in 1761, Daher had offered to grant Shefa-Amr to his son Uthman in exchange for the latter assassinating Daher's brother Sa'd. Although Uthman complied, Daher reneged following protestations by Shefa-Amr's inhabitants. Uthman and his brothers Ahmad and Sa'id besieged the village in 1765 but were repulsed by its local defenders with Daher's support. Uthman was nevertheless granted Shefa-Amr at some point by Daher. The old mosque of Shefa Amr was founded at this time, with a dedicatory inscription dating it to 1761–1762. Uthman is generally credited as the builder of its large fortress, though Petersen suggests he more accurately expanded it to its current large size. Mikha'il Sabbagh recorded a now lost dedicatory inscription from the fortress dated to 1768–1769:

Stop at a house in which charity manifested themselves increasingly
It was constructed by the generous Uthman who was given to be a lord
His house is the full moon upon which the lion sat
Look at the chronogram; verily this is the abode of happiness

After Daher's death in 1775, the Ottoman-appointed governor Jazzar Pasha allowed Uthman to continue as subgovernor of Shefa-Amr in return for a promise of loyalty and advance payment of taxes. Jazzar Pasha ignored orders from Constantinople to demolish the village's fortress. Several years later Uthman was removed and replaced by Ibrahim Abu Qalush, an appointee of Jazzar Pasha, who rebelled against him in 1789.

==== Later Ottoman period ====
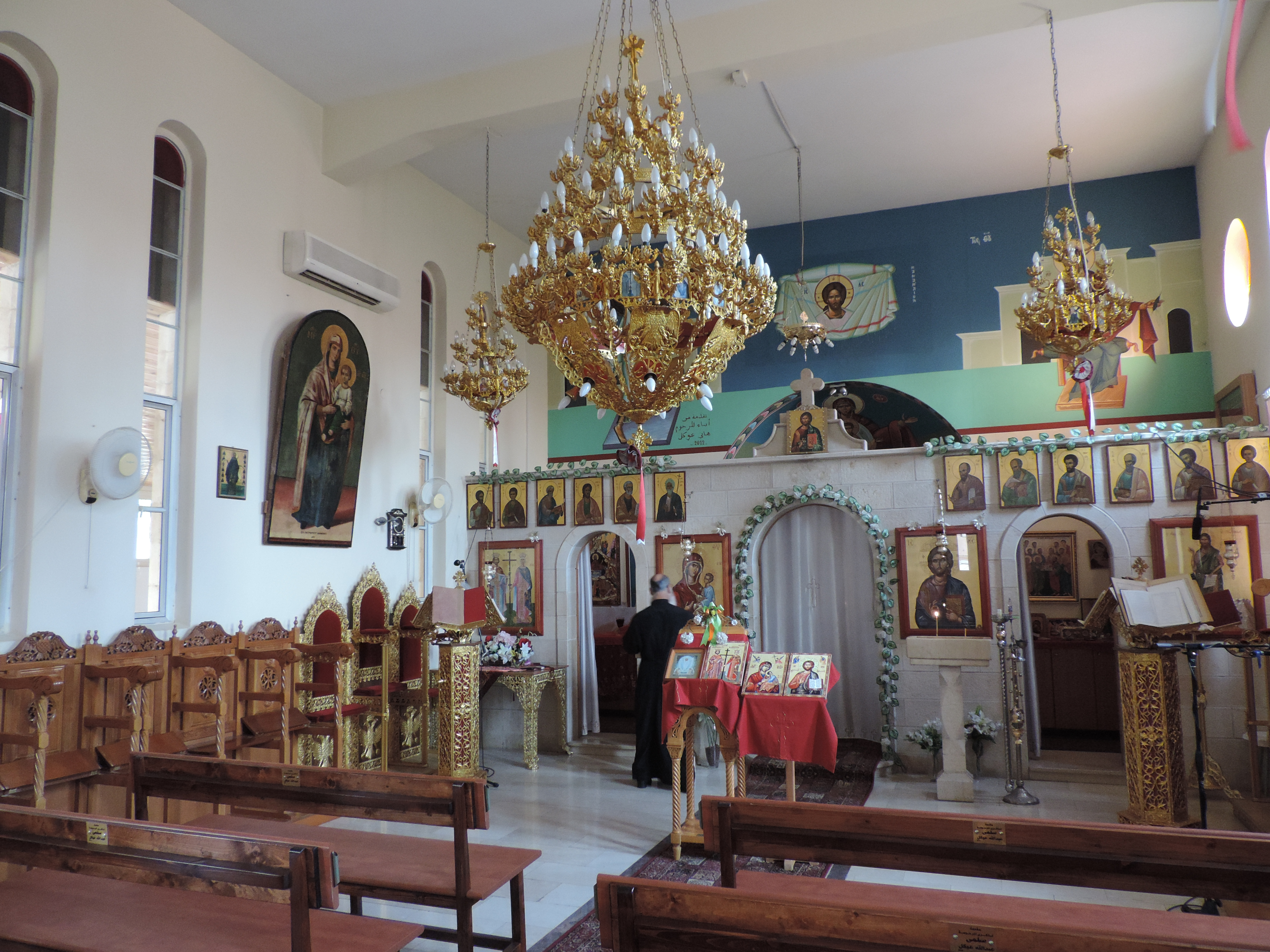
Ss. Constantine and Helena Church

A map by Pierre Jacotin from Napoleon's invasion of 1799 showed the place, named as Chafa Amr.

A Jewish community had been established in the village under the auspices of Daher's rule. In 1839, Moses Montefiore counted 107 Sephardic Jews living in Shefa-Amr. Their condition worsened with the departure of the autonomous leader of Egypt, Muhammad Ali Pasha, during which time Shefa-Amr was nearly emptied of its Jewish residents, who had opted to move to Haifa and Tiberias. James Finn wrote in 1877 that "The majority of the inhabitants are Druses. There are a few Moslems and a few Christians; but [in 1850] there were thirty Jewish families living as agriculturists, cultivating grain and olives on their own landed property, most of it family inheritance; some of these people were of Algerine descent. They had their own synagogue and legally qualified butcher, and their numbers had formerly been more considerable." However, "they afterwards dwindled to two families, the rest removing to [Haifa] as that port rose in prosperity."

Shefa-Amr, 1910

Conder and Kitchener, who visited in 1875, was told that the community consisted of "2,500 souls—1,200 being Moslems, the rest Druses, Greeks, and Latins." The town's Druze community dwindled considerably in the 1880s as its members migrated east to the Hauran plain to avoid conscription by the Ottoman authorities. A population list from about 1887 showed that Shefa-Amr had about 2,750 inhabitants; 795 Muslims, 95 Greek Catholics, 1,100 Catholics, 140 Latins, 175 Maronites/Protestants, 30 Jews and 440 Druze. That year, some 42 Jewish families from Morocco settled in Shefa-Amr.

=== British Mandate ===
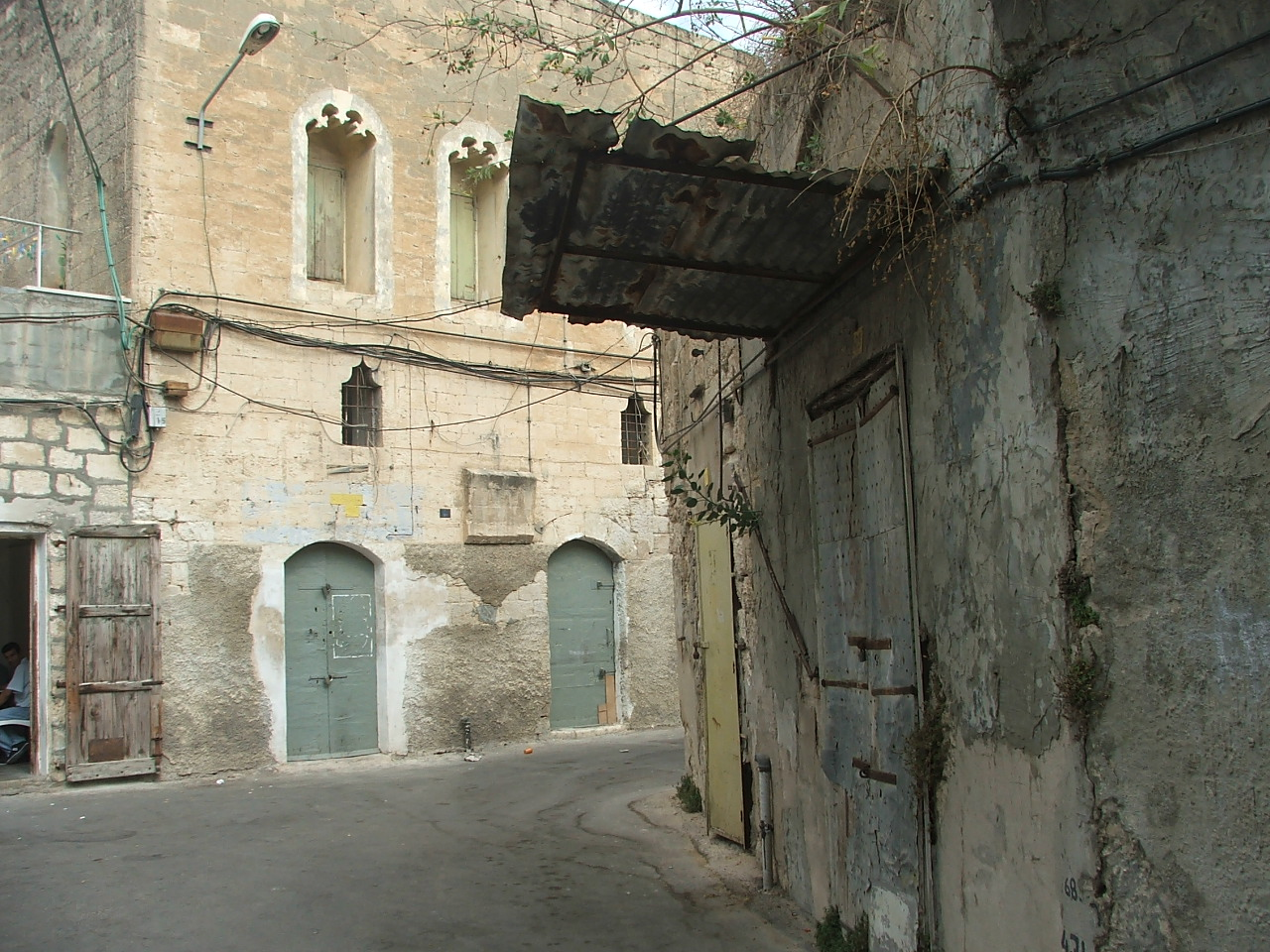
The old market in Shefa-Amr

The British Mandate of Palestine was established in 1920. By then, all of Shefa-Amr's Jews had moved out. According to the 1922 census of Palestine, Shefa-Amr had a population of 2,288: 1,263 Christians, 623 Muslims, and 402 Druze. Of the Christians, 1,054 were Melkites (Greek Catholics), 94 Anglicans, 70 Roman Catholics, 42 Greek Orthodox and three Maronites. By the 1931 census, Shefa-Amr had 629 occupied houses and a population of 1,321 Christians, 1,006 Muslims, 496 Druze, and one Jew. A further 1,197 Muslims in 234 occupied houses was recorded for "Shafa 'Amr Suburbs".

Statistics compiled by the Mandatory government in the 1945 statistics showed an urban population of 1,560 Christians, 1,380 Muslims, 10 Jews and 690 "others" (presumably Druze) and a rural population of 3,560 Muslims.

=== Israel ===
==== 20th century ====
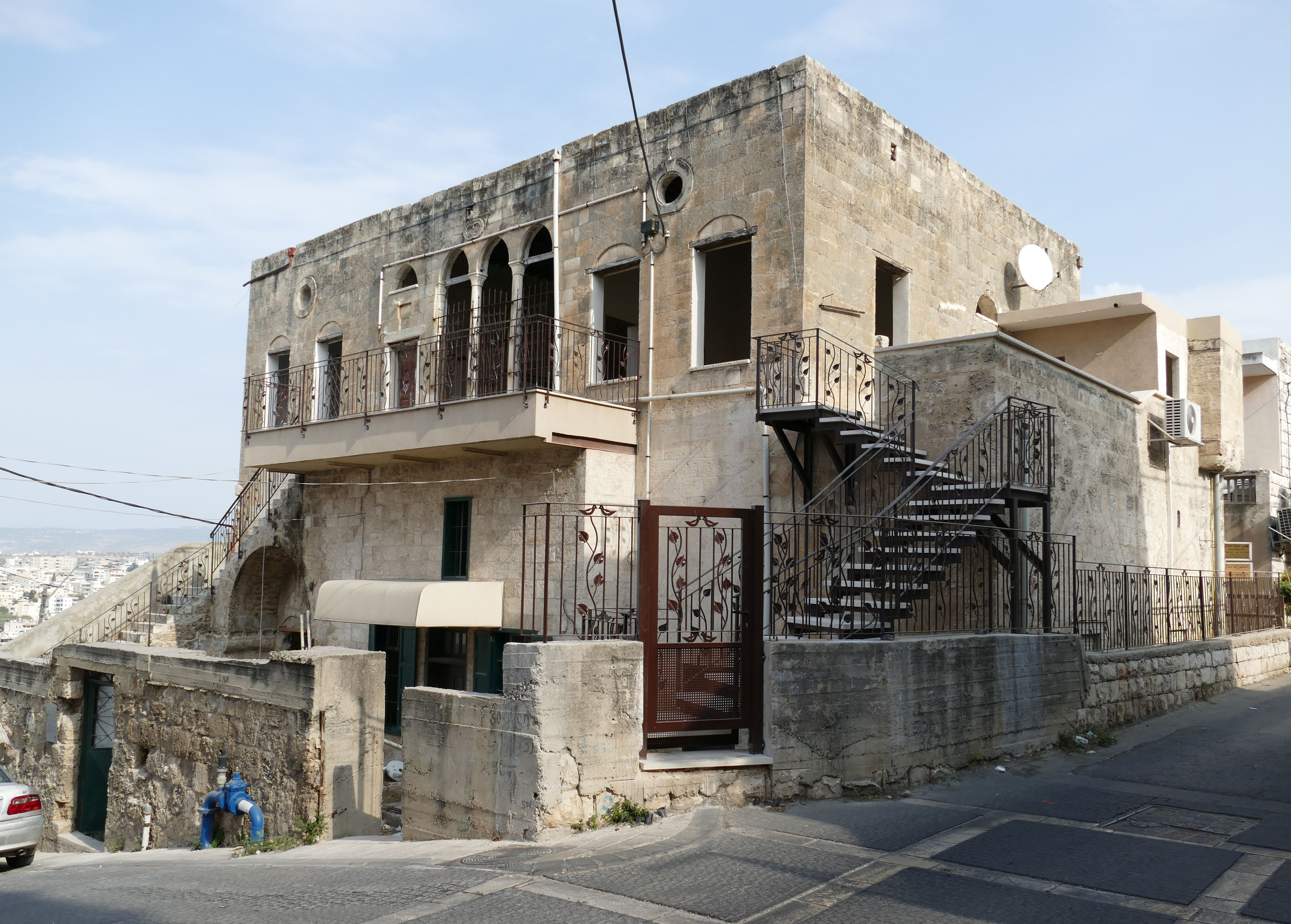
A traditional house in the old town of Shefa-Amr

In 1948 Shefa-Amr was captured by the Israeli Army during the first phase of Operation Dekel, from 8 to 14 July. The Druze population actively cooperated with the IDF. The Muslim quarter was heavily shelled and thousands of inhabitants fled to Saffuriyeh. Following the fall of Nazareth some of the refugees were allowed to return to their homes. After the end of the war, the Arab population was placed under strict martial law until 1967.

Ibraheem Nimr Hussein, a former mayor of Shefa-Amr, was chairman of the Committee of Arab Mayors in Israel (later the Arab Follow-Up Committee) from its inception in 1975. In 1981 an NGO to promote health care in the Arab community was set up in Shefa-Amr. It called itself The Galilee Society - the Arab National Society for Health Research and Services. In 1982, following the Israeli invasion of Lebanon, Mayor Ibrahim Nimr Husayn formed the "Supreme Follow-Up Committee" based on a committee that had been formed following Land Day. It consisted of 11 heads of local councils as well as Arab Members of Knesset. By the 1990s the committee, meeting in Nazareth, had expanded and become a mini-parliament representing Palestinians in the Galilee.

==== 21st century ====
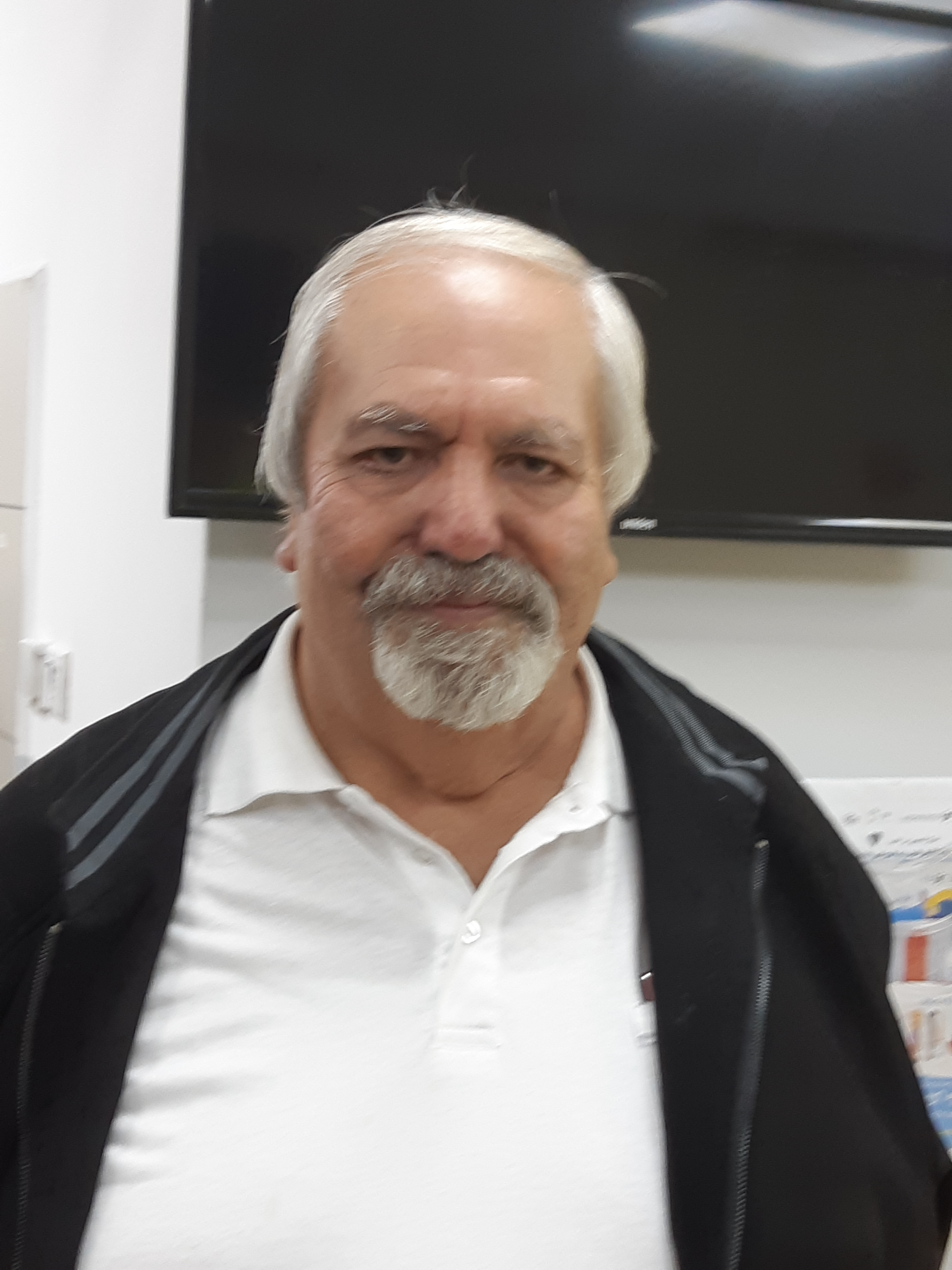
Orsan Yasen, mayor of Shefa-Amr (2018-2024)

On 16 May 2004, Whehebe Moheen, a man in his sixties, murdered Manal Najeeb Abu Raed, his widowed daughter-in-law, wife of his son, and mother of his two granddaughters. Manal had lost her husband to cancer two years earlier, and was living in the couple's home, in the Druze village of Daliat El Carmel, near Haifa. Following this event there was conflict between the families of the victim and of the killer. The final reconciliation took place on 27 February 2009, when about 300 family members, dignitaries and residents of the mixed city of Shefa-Amr and Daliyat al-Carmel participated in the reconciliation ritual. They gathered, along with Christian and Muslim dignitaries, including mayors of the two towns involved, Knesset members (Druze and Muslim), the religious leader of Israel's Druze community, and a sizable contingent of Druze religious leaders from many villages in northern Israel. Following the speeches, the dignitaries signed the sulha (reconciliation) agreement, and after the document was declared officially endorsed, the killer's family handed the leader of the sulha committee, Sheikh Muafak Tarif, a bag containing the blood money (diya) compensation, and Tarif handed the bag to cousins of the murdered woman. The bag contained 200,000 NIS (about US$50,000), about half what a "normal" conciliation payment would be, but the killer's family refused to bring more money, claiming that they had no resources, and were not prepared to make themselves bankrupt because of a "crazy" uncle.

On 4 August 2005, an Israeli soldier who was absent without leave, Eden Natan-Zada, opened fire while aboard a bus in the city, killing four Arab residents and wounding twenty-two others. After the shooting, Natan-Zada was overcome by nearby crowds, lynched and beaten with rocks. According to witnesses, the bus driver was surprised to see a kippah-wearing Jewish soldier making his way to Shefa-Amr via public bus, so inquired of Natan-Zada whether he was certain he wanted to take his current route. The four fatalities were two sisters in their early twenties, Hazar and Dina Turki, and two men, bus driver Michel Bahouth and Nader Hayek. In the days following the attack, 40,000 people attended mass funeral services for the victims. The sisters were buried in an Islamic cemetery and the men were buried in the Catholic cemetery. The wounded were taken to Rambam Hospital in Haifa. The Shefa-Amr municipality established a monument to commemorate the victims.

In January 2008, Mayor Ursan Yassin met with officials of the Israeli state committee on the celebrations for the 60th anniversary of independence, and announced that Shefa-Amr intended to take part in the celebrations. In 2011, 7,000 Christians, Druze and Muslims held a solidarity march in support of Christians in Iraq and Egypt who were suffering from religious persecution.

On November 18, 2024, a Hezbollah rocket struck a residential building in the city, killing a woman in her 50s and causing injuries to 56 others, including 18 children and teenagers.

== Geography ==
Shefa-Amr is located in the North District of Israel at the entrance to the Galilee. It is located 13 kilometres (8.1 mi) from the Mediterranean Sea and 20 kilometres (12 mi) from each of three cities, Haifa, Acre and Nazareth, where many of the inhabitants are employed. The city is located on seven hills, which gives it the name "Little Rome". The elevation of the city and its strategic location as the connection between the valleys and mountains of Galilee made it more than once the center of its district, especially in the period of Uthman, the son of Daher al-Umar, who built a castle in it, and towers around it. The bay of Haifa with the sea stretching between Haifa and Acre and the high mountains of Galilee and the valleys surrounding the city could be seen from high points in the city.

== Demographics ==
In 1951, the population was 4450, of whom about 10% were internally displaced persons from other villages. During the early 1950s, about 25,000 dunams of the land of Shefa-Amr were expropriated by the following method: the land was declared a closed military area, then after enough time had passed for it to have become legally "uncultivated", the Minister of Agriculture used his powers to "ensure that it was cultivated" by giving it to neighboring Jewish majority communities. Some of the land was owned by Jews. Another 7,579 dunams were expropriated in 1953–4. The total land holdings of the village fell from 58,725 dunams in 1945 to 10,371 dunams in 1962.

According to CBS, in 2012 the religious and ethnic makeup of the city was mostly Arabs (consisting of 59.2% Muslim, 26.5% Christian, and 14.3% Druze). Shefa-Amr is home to the fourth-largest Arab Christian community in Israel, and are mostly Greek-Melkite Catholics. According to CBS, in 2012 there were 38,300 registered citizens in the city. 40.4% of the population was not over 19 years old, 14.9% between 20 and 29, 21.1% between 30 and 44, 17.8% from 45 to 64, and 5.7% 65 or older. In 2022, 62% of the population was Muslim, 24.4% was Christian and 13.6% was Druze.

Population in Shefa-Amr over the years:

== Economy ==
According to CBS, in 2012 there were 12,494 salaried and 1062 self-employed workers in the city. The mean monthly wage in 2012 for a salaried worker in the city was ILS 5,412. Salaried males had a mean monthly wage of ILS 6,312 versus ILS 3,904 for females. The mean income for the self-employed was ILS 7,381. 235 people received unemployment benefits and 3,971 received an income guarantee.

== Education and culture ==
In 2012, there were 24 schools serving a student population of 9,459: 15 elementary schools with 5,360 students and 13 high schools with 4,099 students. In 2012, 53.7% of twelfth grade students earned a matriculation certificate. In the eastern part of the city, Mifal HaPayis built a public computer center, a public library, a large events hall and more.

Shefa-Amr is also home to Tamrat El Zeitoun, an elementary school (about 150 students) notable for serving Muslim, Christian, and Druze together and being the only Arabic language Waldorf school. In collaboration with Waldorf educators at Harduf the school developed a language curriculum accommodating the differences between written and spoken Arabic. The school celebrates the festivals from all three religions.

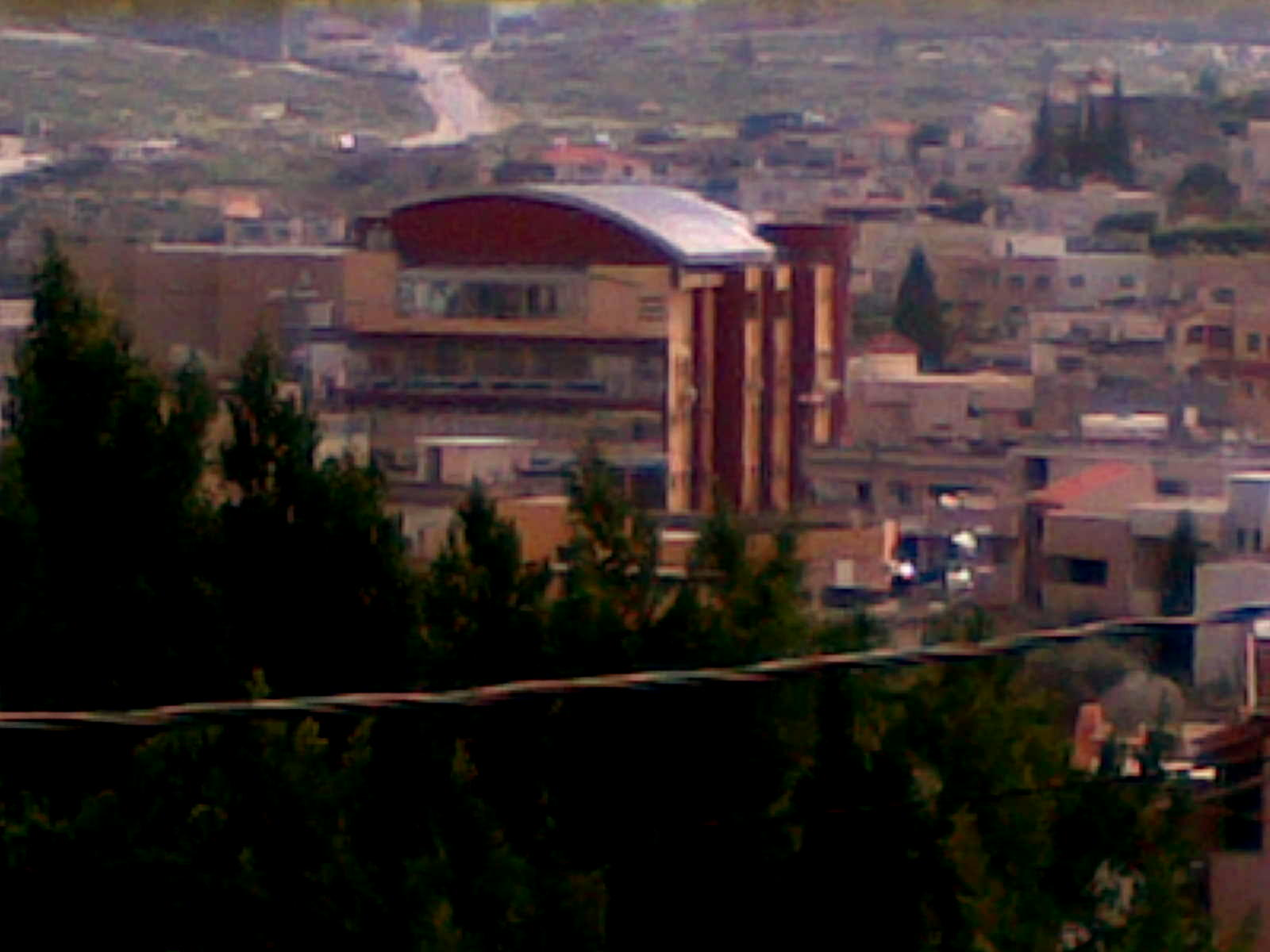
Beit almusica

The Beit Almusica conservatory was founded in 1999 by musician Aamer Nakhleh in the center of Shefa-ʻAmr. It offers a year-round programs of music studies in various instruments, and holds music performances and concerts. Every year Shefa-ʻAmr holds a music festival known as the "Fort Festival." Arab children from all over the country compete in singing classic Arabic songs and one is chosen as "Voice of the Year." The Ba'ath choir, established by Raheeb Haddad, performs all over the country and participates in many international events. Singer Reem Talhami performs all over the Arab world. Oud player and violinist Tayseer Elias, on the Beit Almusica staff, is a composer, conductor and musicologist who also lectures at Bar-Ilan University. Butrus Lusia, a painter, specializes in icons.

Al Ghurbal center in Shefa-Amr

The first plays in Shefa-Amr were performed in the 1950s by the Christian scouts. Since the 1970s, many theaters have opened. among them the sons of Shefa-ʻAmr theater, Athar theater, house of the youth theater, Alghurbal Al Shefa-Amry theater and Al Ufok theater. The largest theater in the city is the Ghurbal Establishment, a national Arab theater. Sa'eed Salame, an actor, comedian and pantomimist, established a 3-day international pantomime festival that is held annually.

Shefa-Amr is known for its mastic-based ice cream, bozet Shefa-'Amr.The Nakhleh Coffee Company is the leading coffee producer in Israel's Arab community. New restaurant-cafes opened in parts of the old city and encouraged nightlife, being patronised by the youth of Shefa-ʻAmr. The Awt Cafe started holding musical nights where local singers and instruments players including oud and others perform for the audience.

== Landmarks and religious sites ==
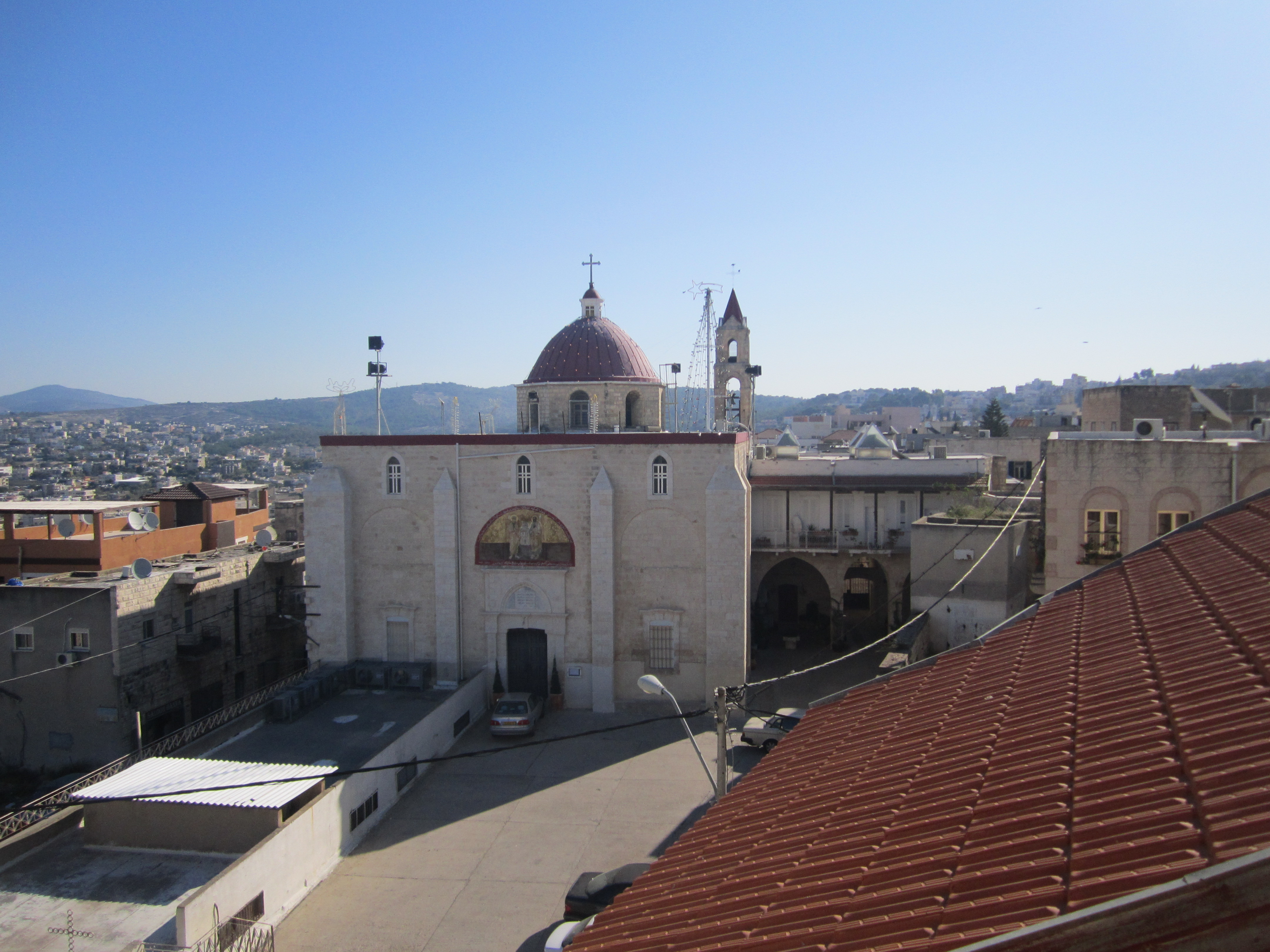
St. Peter & St. Paul Church

- A fort was built in 1760 by Daher al-Umar to secure the entrance to Galilee. The fort was built on the ruins of a Crusader fort called "Le Seffram". The ground floor of the fort stabled the horses, the first floor above ground was for Daher's residential quarters. Daher's fort is considered the biggest fort remaining in the Galilee. After the establishment of the state, the fort was used as a police station. After a new station was built in the "Fawwar" neighbourhood, the fort was renovated and converted to a youth center, which has since closed down.
- "The Tower" or "al Burj" is an old Crusader fort located in the southern part of the city.

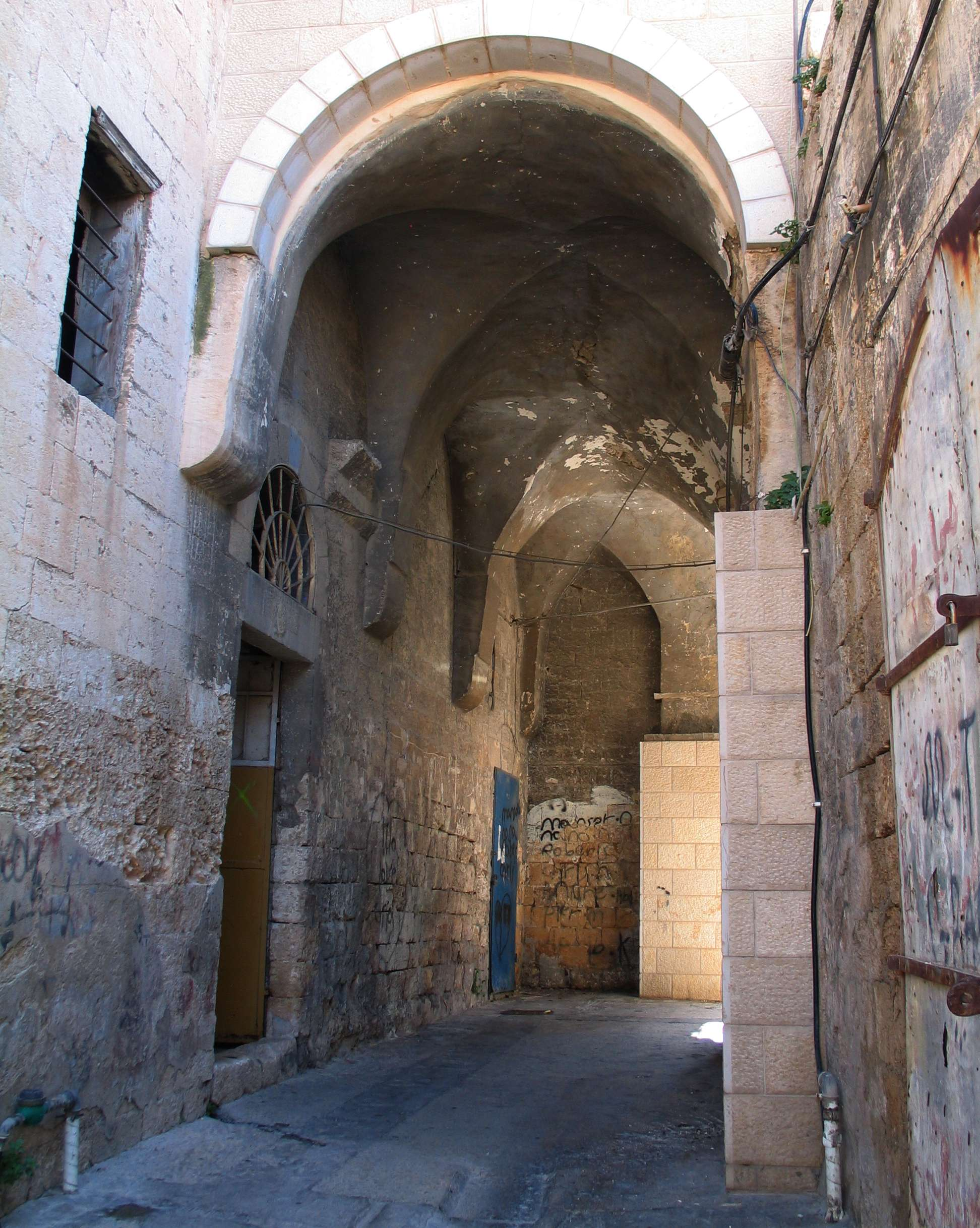
The old market of Shefa-Amr

- The old market of Shefa-Amr was once the bustling heart of the city. Now all that remains is one coffee shop where elderly men gather every day to play backgammon and drink coffee. According to the mayor of Shefa-Amr, Nahed Khazem, the government provided a budget for improving and reviving the old market and developing the area around the fort as a tourist attraction.
- The Shfaram Ancient Synagogue is an old synagogue on the site of an even older structure. It is recorded as being active in 1845. A Muslim resident of the town holds the keys. The synagogue was renovated in 2006. The tomb of Rabbi Judah ben Baba, a well-known rabbi from the 2nd century who was captured and executed by the Romans, is still standing and many Jewish believers come to visit it.
- Byzantine period tombs are located in the middle of the city. They were the graves of the 5th and 6th-century Christian community. The tomb entrances are decorated with sculptures of lions and Greek inscriptions which make mention of Jesus.
- In the center of the city, where the Sisters of Nazareth convent now stands, was a 4th-century church, St. Jacob's. This church is mentioned in the notes of ecclesiastical historians, although the original church has been replaced by the monastery. Some marble columns remain, similar to those used to build the earliest churches.
- St. Peter & St. Paul Church is located in one of the town's peaks near the fort, it has a high bell tower and a large purple dome. The church was built by Otman, who made a promise to build it if his fort was finished successfully. The walls of the church began to weaken, and in 1904 the entire church building was reinforced and renovated. This is the main church of the local Greek Catholic community.
- The Mosque of Ali Ibn Abi Talib (Old Mosque) was constructed near the castle in the days of Sulayman Pasha

== Voting patterns ==
In the 2022 election, 79 percent of voters in Shefa-Amr voted for the Arab parties, while 18 percent voted for the parties of the center-left coalition led by Yair Lapid and 2 percent voted for the parties of the right-wing coalition led by Benjamin Netanyahu. Among the voters for the Arab parties, 46 percent voted for the Hadash–Ta'al list, while 28 percent voted for Balad and 25 percent voted for Ra'am.

In the 2026 election, 80 percent of voters in Shefa-Amr voted for the Arab parties, while 18 percent voted for the parties of the center-left coalition led by Gadi Eisenkot and 1.5 percent voted for the parties of the right-wing coalition led by Benjamin Netanyahu. Among the voters for the Arab parties, 74 percent voted for the Joint List, while 26 percent voted for Ra'am. Voter turnout increased 61 percent from the 2022 election.

== Notable people ==
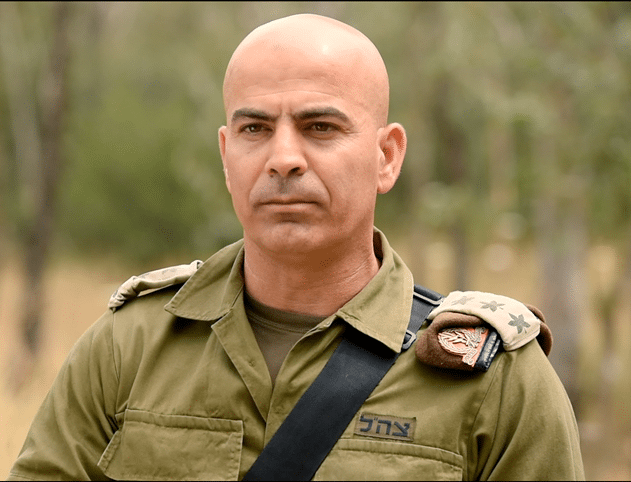
Ghassan Alian

- Jumana Emil Abboud (born 1971), Palestinian artist
- Karimeh Abbud (1893–1940), photographer and artist
- Ghassan Alian (born 1972), first non-Jewish commander of the Golani Brigade
- Hamad Amar (born 1974), Member of the Knesset
- Mansour F. Armaly (1927–2005), physician who studied glaucoma
- Zahi Armeli (born 1957), former footballer Asad Azi (born 1955), Palestinian painter
- Mohammad Barakeh (born 1955), Member of the Knesset
- Emile Habibi (1922–1996), Christian Israeli-Palestinian writer and communist politician. his father originated in Shefa-Amr
- Salah-Hassan Hanifes (1913–2002), Member of the Knesset
- Rami Hamadeh (born 1994), Palestinian footballer, who represented Palestine at the 2019 AFC Asian Cup
- Henya of Shklov (died 1813), first wife of Talmudic scholar Yisroel ben Shmuel of Shklov; died during the 1813 plague and her burial in the town is documented in the historical rabbinic text Pe'at HaShulchan.
- Saleh Shahin (born 1982), Israeli Paralympic medalist rower
- Iyad Shalabi (born 1987), represented Israel at the 2020 Summer Paralympics, where he won two gold medals in swimming

== See also ==
- Arab localities in Israel
- People from Shefa-'Amr

== Bibliography ==
- Abu Raya, Rafeh (2010-08-01). "'En Shefar'am Final Report". Hadashot Arkheologiyot – Excavations and Surveys in Israel (122).
- Abu Shama (d.1268) (1969): Livre des deux jardins ("The Book of Two Gardens"). Recueil des Historiens des Croisades, Cited in Petersen (2001).
- Atrash, Walid (2016-07-18). "'En Shefar'am Highway 79". Hadashot Arkheologiyot – Excavations and Surveys in Israel (128).
- Barag, Dan (1979). "A new source concerning the ultimate borders of the Latin Kingdom of Jerusalem". Israel Exploration Journal. 29: 197–217.
- Barnai, Jacob (1992). The Jews in Palestine in the Eighteenth Century: Under the Patronage of the Istanbul Committee of Officials for Palestine. Translated by Naomi Goldblum. University of Alabama Press. ISBN 978-0-8173-0572-7.
- Bsoul, T. (2021). "שפרעם: צמיחתה מכפר לעיר בשלהי התקופה העות'מאנית, 1864-1914" [Shefa'amr: Its Development from Village to Town in the Late Ottoman Period, 1864-1914]. Horizons in Geography. 99: 31–58. JSTOR 27239154. *Barron, J.B., ed. (1923). Palestine: Report and General Abstracts of the Census of 1922. Government of Palestine.
- Cohen, Amnon (1973). Palestine in the Eighteenth Century: Patterns of Government and Administration. Jerusalem: Magnes Press, Hebrew University. ISBN 1-59045-955-5.
- Conder, C.R.; Kitchener, H.H. (1881). The Survey of Western Palestine: Memoirs of the Topography, Orography, Hydrography, and Archaeology. Vol. 1. London: Committee of the Palestine Exploration Fund. p. 271-3,
- Department of Statistics (1945). Village Statistics, April, 1945. Government of Palestine.
- Ellenblum, R. (2003). Frankish Rural Settlement in the Latin Kingdom of Jerusalem. Cambridge University Press. ISBN 9780521521871.
- Feig, Nurit (2014-08-28). "'En Shefar'am Final Report". Hadashot Arkheologiyot – Excavations and Surveys in Israel (126).
- Finn, J. (1877). Byeways in Palestine. London: James Nisbet.
- Firro, Kais (1992). A History of the Druzes. Vol. 1. BRILL. ISBN 9004094377.
- Guérin, V. (1880). Description Géographique Historique et Archéologique de la Palestine (in French). Vol. 3: Galilee, pt. 1. Paris: L'Imprimerie Nationale.
- Hadawi, S. (1970). Village Statistics of 1945: A Classification of Land and Area ownership in Palestine. Palestine Liberation Organization Research Center.
- Heyd, Uriel (1960): Ottoman Documents on Palestine, 1552-1615, Oxford University Press, Oxford. Cited in Petersen (2001)
- Herzog, C. and S. Gazit, The Arab-Israeli Wars, Vintage books, 2005.
- Hütteroth, W.-D.; Abdulfattah, K. (1977). Historical Geography of Palestine, Transjordan and Southern Syria in the Late 16th Century. Erlanger Geographische Arbeiten, Sonderband 5. Erlangen, Germany: Vorstand der Fränkischen Geographischen Gesellschaft. ISBN 3-920405-41-2.
- Joudah, Ahmad Hasan (2013). Revolt in Palestine in the Eighteenth Century: The Era of Shaykh Zahir al-Umar (Second ed.). Gorgias Press. ISBN 978-1-4632-0002-2.
- Karmon, Y. (1960). "An Analysis of Jacotin's Map of Palestine" (PDF). Israel Exploration Journal. 10 (3, 4): 155–173, 244–253.
- Mariti, G. (1792). Travels Through Cyprus, Syria, and Palestine; with a General History of the Levant. Vol. 1. Dublin: P. Byrne. (pp. 366-367)
- Mills, E., ed. (1932). Census of Palestine 1931. Population of Villages, Towns and Administrative Areas. Jerusalem: Government of Palestine.
- Morris, B. (1987). The Birth of the Palestinian refugee problem, 1947-1949. Cambridge University Press. ISBN 0-521-33028-9.
- Morris, B. (1993). Israel's Border Wars, 1949 - 1956. Arab Infiltration, Israeli Retaliation, and the Countdown to the Suez War. Oxford University Press. ISBN 0-19-827850-0.
- Vilnai, Z., "Shefa-'Amr, Between the past and the present", Jerusalem 1962.
- Palmer, E.H. (1881). The Survey of Western Palestine: Arabic and English Name Lists Collected During the Survey by Lieutenants Conder and Kitchener, R. E. Transliterated and Explained by E.H. Palmer. Committee of the Palestine Exploration Fund.
- Petersen, Andrew (2001). A Gazetteer of Buildings in Muslim Palestine (British Academy Monographs in Archaeology). Vol. 1. Oxford University Press. ISBN 978-0-19-727011-0.
- Philipp, T. (2001). Acre: The Rise and Fall of a Palestinian City, 1730–1831. Columbia University Press. ISBN 978-0-231-50603-8.
- Pringle, D. (1997). Secular buildings in the Crusader Kingdom of Jerusalem: an archaeological Gazetter. Cambridge University Press. ISBN 0-521-46010-7.
- Pringle, D. (1998). The Churches of the Crusader Kingdom of Jerusalem: L-Z (excluding Tyre). Vol. 2. Cambridge University Press. ISBN 0-521-39037-0.
- Rhode, H. (1979). Administration and Population of the Sancak of Safed in the Sixteenth Century (PhD). Columbia University.
- Rogers, Mary Eliza, (1865): Domestic Life in Palestine (Also cited in Petersen, 2001)
- Schumacher, G. (1888). "Population list of the Liwa of Akka". Quarterly Statement - Palestine Exploration Fund. 20: 169–191.
- Singer, A. (2002). Constructing Ottoman Beneficence: An Imperial Soup Kitchen in Jerusalem. Albany: State University of New York Press. ISBN 0-7914-5352-9.
- Sorek, Tamir (2015). Palestinian Commemoration in Israel: Calendars, Monuments, and Martyrs. Stanford, CA: Stanford University Press. ISBN 9780804795203.
- Syon, Danny; Hillmann, Avner (2006-04-24). "'En Shefar'am Final Report". Hadashot Arkheologiyot – Excavations and Surveys in Israel (118).
- Tsafrir, Y.; Leah Di Segni; Judith Green (1994). (TIR): Tabula Imperii Romani: Judaea, Palaestina. Jerusalem: Israel Academy of Sciences and Humanities. ISBN 965-208-107-8.
- Zaharoni, M. [in Hebrew] (1978). Israel Guide - Lower Galilee and Kinneret Region (A useful encyclopedia for the knowledge of the country) (in Hebrew). Vol. 3. Jerusalem: Keter Publishing House, in affiliation with the Israel Ministry of Defence. OCLC 745203905., s.v. שפרעם
