= Trinity Baptist Church sex scandal =

Child sexual abuse scandal in Concord, New Hampshire

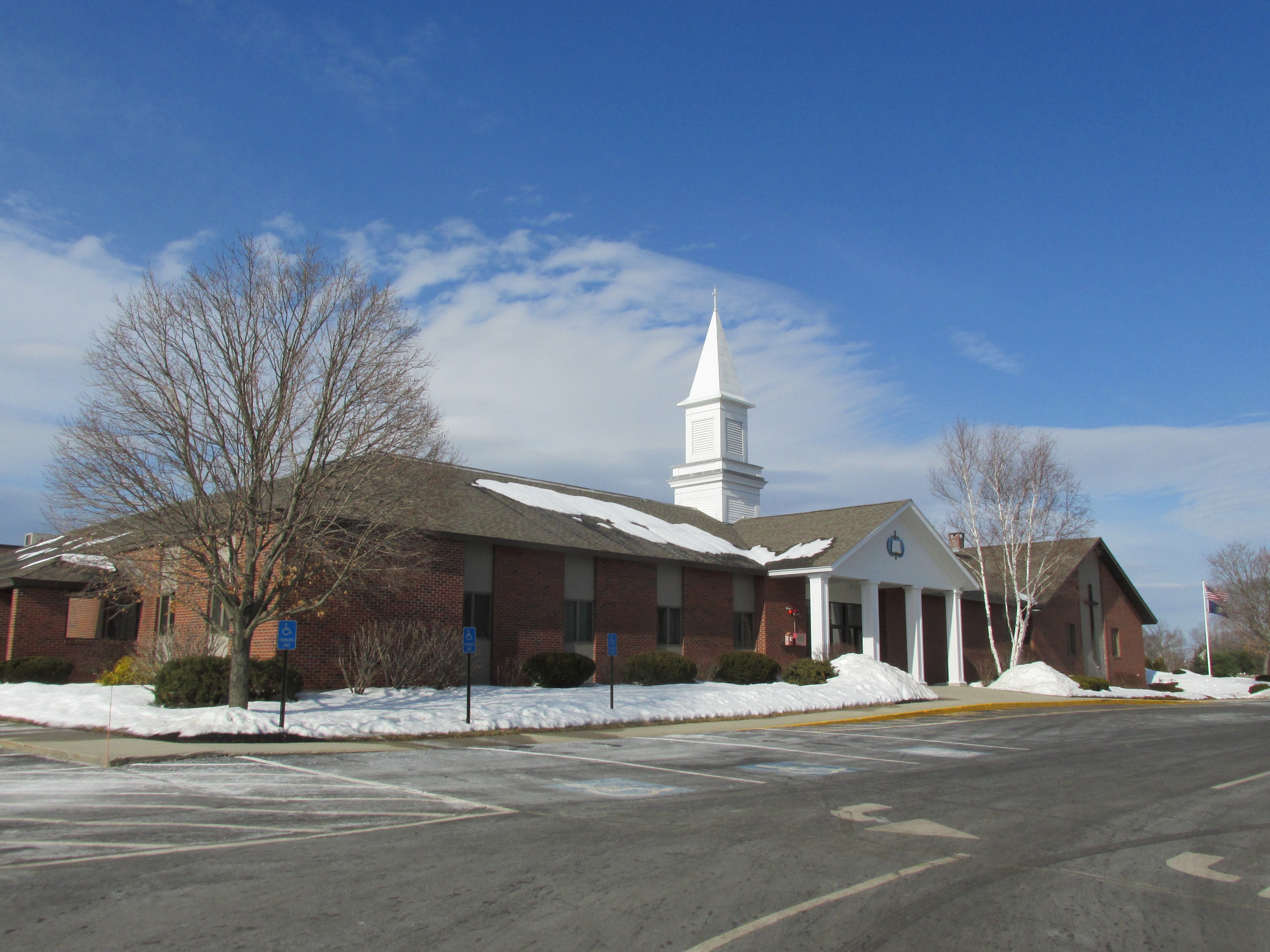
Trinity Baptist Church

The Trinity Baptist Church sex scandal was a United States sex scandal that came to national attention in 2011. The scandal centered on the way that Trinity Baptist Church, an Independent Baptist church in Concord, New Hampshire, and its former pastor handled the 1997 rape and subsequent pregnancy of one of its members, an underage girl, by her employer. The employer was another member of the congregation who hired the girl as a babysitter for his children.

== Rape of Tina Anderson ==
In 1997, Tina Anderson, a 15-year-old member of Trinity Baptist Church, was raped by church member and father Ernest Willis, whose children she babysat. She became pregnant, and Anderson later testified that she had confided her pregnancy to Willis, and that Willis offered to pay for an abortion but when rejected by Anderson, Willis suggested punching Anderson in the stomach to induce a miscarriage, which she also rejected.

Chuck Phelps was the senior pastor at the time. According to a 20/20 documentary about the incident, Phelps allegedly forced Anderson to "confess her sin" before the congregation, covered up the crime by sending her to another Independent Baptist family in Colorado during her pregnancy, and had her give up her child for adoption.

The people around Anderson told her not to talk about it, and the case remained unaddressed until Anderson received a call from the Concord police in February 2010. Matt Barnhart, a former Trinity Baptist Church member who had witnessed Anderson's "church discipline" session in 1997, had reported the session on a blog (Independent Fundamentalist Baptist (IFB) cult survivors). The blog founder Jocelyn Zichterman followed up with Barnhart and upon learning Anderson's identity and location she contacted the Concord police. Willis was arrested in 2010.

On April 8, 2011, the incident was featured on ABC's 20/20, as part of a show about religious abuse including other cases of rape like Anderson's, in Independent Fundamentalist Baptist churches. In response to the 20/20 episode, Phelps posted a statement to his website in which he said that Anderson was 16 at the time of her pregnancy, said the accused rapist was never a church officer, and said that Anderson was never forced to make a statement before the church.

Before trial, Willis pleaded guilty to one count of statutory rape but denied he forcibly raped Tina Anderson twice in 1997. She said it happened once while he was giving her driving lessons and again at her home weeks later. Willis testified that the two had sex on only one occasion and it was consensual.

The trial started in May 2011. On May 27, 2011, a jury found Willis guilty of three counts of forcible rape and a count of felonious sexual assault; and on September 7, 2011, a judge sentenced him to 15 to 30 years in prison. In a victim impact statement at sentencing, Anderson said that Willis destroyed the person she was and filled her with shame and guilt. Willis appealed his conviction to the New Hampshire Supreme Court; the court denied his appeal.

Despite the media outcry, Phelps remained on Bob Jones University's Board of Trustees until an online campaign finally led to his resignation in December 2011.

== Response of Trinity Baptist Church ==
In June 2010 Brian Fuller, the pastor who followed Phelps, expressed deep regret about the way Phelps had handled the incident and disgust that Willis was allowed to remain a church member for seven years following the incident.

On April 8, 2011, the church released a statement of regret about the incident:

"Trinity Baptist Church continues to support authorities that are pursuing justice in this matter. In October of 1997, the leadership of Trinity Baptist Church reported the incident pursuant to the laws of the State of New Hampshire. The Division of Children, Youth and Families was immediately notified. In addition, the Concord Police Department received multiple, documented calls from our church leadership.

"Trinity Baptist Church’s present leadership has expressed regrets as to how the incident was handled. We regret that the victim stood before our congregation and we further regret that the accused remained in our congregation awaiting arrest by the Concord Police Department. We continue to cooperate with all law enforcement and investigative agencies in the pursuit of justice."

== Remedial measures taken by Trinity Baptist Church ==
In June 2010, the congregation approved three amendments to the church constitution. The first created a Security Team to provide security during public gatherings and to authorize criminal background checks for all volunteers in the children's ministry. The second amendment protected members from being “required to involuntarily participate in a public confession that is not the result of the church discipline process outlined in Article V of the Constitution.” The third amendment restricted membership—and thus the subjects of church discipline—to persons eighteen years or older.
