= Charles D. Phelps =

American physician and academic administrator

Charles Dexter Phelps (September 16, 1937 – September 13, 1985) was a prominent American medical doctor, professor, and researcher in the field of ophthalmology. The clinical studies he oversaw contributed to significant advances in the scientific understanding and surgical and pharmacological treatment of glaucoma.

== Biography ==
Born in San Antonio, Texas, and raised in Waterloo, Iowa, Phelps was the eldest of four sons, all of whom became medical doctors or scientists, born to Gardner Dexter Phelps, M.D., a private-practice ophthalmologist, and Virginia Kuning Phelps.

Phelps earned his undergraduate (B.A., 1959; Phi Beta Kappa) and medical (M.D., 1963; Alpha Omega Alpha) degrees at the University of Iowa in Iowa City. He completed an internship at Boston City Hospital between 1963 and 1964, and a residency there in internal medicine in the following year. From 1965 to 1967, he served in the United States Air Force as a doctor at Andrews Air Force Base near Washington, D.C.

In 1967, Phelps returned to Iowa City to work for a year as an NIH postdoctoral fellow under Mansour F. Armaly in the University of Iowa's glaucoma research laboratory, an experience that persuaded him to become a glaucoma specialist. He continued at the university as a resident in ophthalmology from 1968 to 1971. For the following year, he was an NIH special fellow under Bernard Becker in the department of ophthalmology at Washington University in St. Louis.

Returning to the University of Iowa College of Medicine in 1972 to join its faculty, Phelps succeeded his mentor Armaly as director of the department of ophthalmology's glaucoma service. He attended to hundreds of patients, educated scores of medical students, and wrote dozens of articles for medical journals reporting on the findings of the medical studies he oversaw.

In 1984, after rising to the rank of full professor, Phelps was appointed chair of the university's ophthalmology department, widely recognized as one of the foremost eye clinics in the country. Soon afterward, he was diagnosed with cancer. He died eighteen months later at the age of 47, survived by his wife Margaret Dorsey Phelps, whom he married in 1964, his four children, his parents, and his brothers.

Phelps was a founding member of the American Glaucoma Society. At its first meeting, convened in his honor in Iowa City in 1987, a Hawthorn tree was planted, which still stands outside the ophthalmology department, to commemorate his life and contributions. In a keynote address, Armaly described him as "a prolific contributor of new knowledge" who left a "scientific legacy admirable in its size, variety, and quality," concluding, "There is hardly an area in glaucoma that did not interest him and benefit from his research effort."

== Books ==
- Phelps CD, editor. Manual of Common Ophthalmic Surgical Procedures. New York: Churchill Livingstone, 1986.

== Selected papers ==
- Alward WLM, Farrell T, Hayreh S, Kolder H, Carney B, Phelps C, et al. Five-year follow-up of the fluorouracil filtering surgery study. American Journal of Ophthalmology 1996;121(4):349-366.
- Fluorouracil Filtering Surgery Study Group, Alward WLM, Farrell T, Hayreh S, Kolder H, Carney B, et al. Three-Year Follow-Up of the Fluorouracil Filtering Surgery Study. American Journal of Ophthalmology 1993;115(1):82-92.
- Phelps CD, Corbett JJ. Migraine and Low-Tensions Glaucoma: A Case-Control Study. Investigative Ophthalmology and Visual Science 1985;26(8):1105-1108.
- Phelps CD, Hayreh SS, Montague PR. Comparison of visual field defects in the low-tension glaucomas with those in the high-tension glaucomas. Am J Ophthalmol 1984;98(6):823-5.
- Lewis RA, Phelps CD. Trabeculectomy v. Thermosclerostomy. Archives of Ophthalmology 1984;102(4):533-536.
- Lewis RA, Hayreh SS, Phelps CD. Optic Disk and Visual Field Correlations in Primary Open-angle and Low-Tension Glaucoma. American Journal of Ophthalmology 1983;96(2):148-152.
- Perkins ES, Phelps CD. Open angle glaucoma, ocular hypertension, low-tension glaucoma, and refraction. Arch Ophthalmol 1982;100(9):1464-7.
- Blondeau P, Phelps CD. Trabeculectomy vs. Thermosclerostomy. Archives of Ophthalmology 1981;99(5):810-816.
- Phelps CD. The "no treatment" approach to ocular hypertension. Surv Ophthalmol 1980;25(3):175-82.
- Phelps CD, Armaly MF. Measurement of episcleral venous pressure. Am J Ophthalmol 1978;85(1):35-42.
- Hayreh SS, March W, Phelps CD. Ocular hypotony after retinal vascular occlusion. Trans Ophthalmol Soc U K 1977;97(4):756-67.
- Perez RN, Phelps CD, Burton TC. Angle-Closure Glaucoma Following Scleral Buckling Operations. Transactions - American Academy of Ophthalmology and Otolaryngology 1976;81:247-252.
- Phelps, CD. Angle-Closure Glaucoma Secondary to Ciliary Body Swelling, Archives of Ophthalmology 1974;92(4):287-290.
