= American Glaucoma Society =

Organization promoting education and research of glaucoma

- Industry: Medicine
- Founded: 1985
- Headquarters: San Francisco, USA
- Key people: Kuldev Singh, MD, MPH President; David S. Greenfield, MD Vice President; Christopher A. Girkin, MD, MSPH Secretary; L. Jay Katz, MD Treasurer
- Website: http://www.americanglaucomasociety.net

The American Glaucoma Society (AGS) is a subspecialty society in ophthalmology that promotes education and research about glaucoma among physicians and scientists. Founded in 1985 by thirteen original members, it now has more than 400 members. The society holds workshops annual meetings.

== See also ==
- Charles D. Phelps
