= St. Peter and St. Paul Church, Shefa-Amr =

Church building in Shefa-Amr, Israel

Coordinates: 32.805582°N 35.17002°E

(ar) كنيسة القديسين بطرس وبولس St. Peter & St. Paul Church
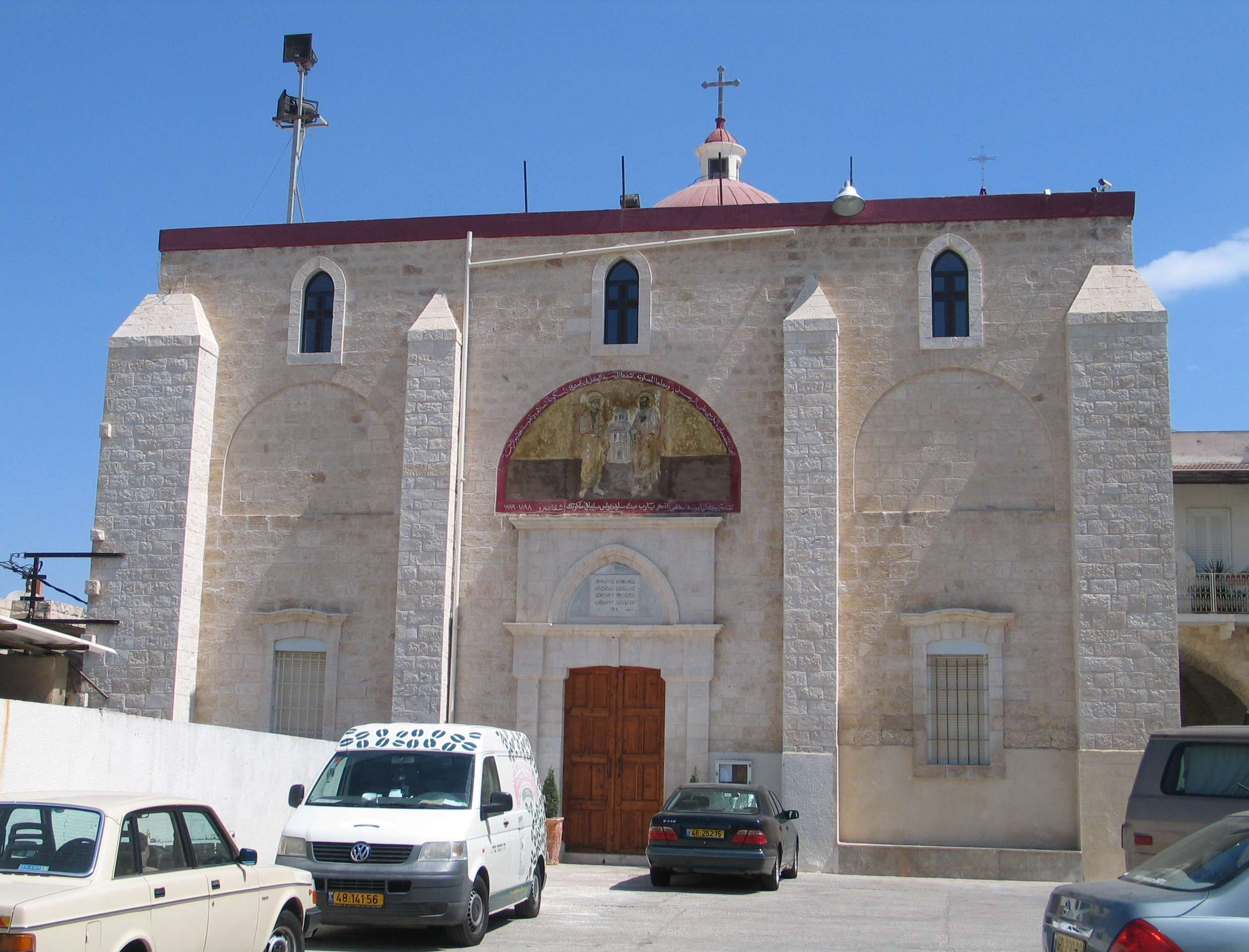
- St. Peter & St. Paul Church

Religion
- Affiliation: Melkite Greek Catholic Church
- Province: 1

Location
- Location: Old city of Shefa-Amr
- Interactive map of (ar) كنيسة القديسين بطرس وبولس; St. Peter & St. Paul Church

St. Peter & St. Paul Church is located in the city of Shefa-Amr, Israel on one of the town's peaks of the old city. It has a high bell tower and a large purple dome which used to be blue until it was changed in the year of 2009. Masses are conducted in the church in Arabic and because the Greek Catholics are a majority in the city it is considered the main church of the city.

== History ==
=== Ottoman period ===
The church was built during the Ottoman era under Uthman al-Zahir, son of the autonomous Arab ruler Zahir al-Umar, who made a promise to build it if his fort was finished successfully, so its history goes back to that of Uthman's fort. The walls of the church started to get weak so in 1904 the whole church was strengthened and improved. It remains standing today and is the main church of the Greek Catholic community of Shefa-'Amr.

=== Today ===
During the years 2010-2011 the church went through a major improvement process where the walls stones were cleaned and polished, old stone walls that were covered in the past with cement were revealed to get their original old shape, the dome was re-painted and air-conditioning was installed inside.

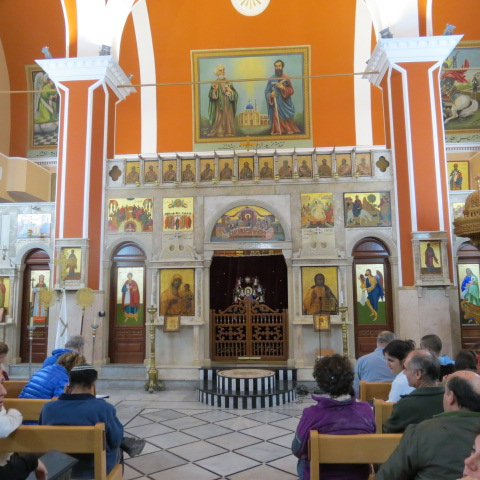
Internal View
