= Charles Phelps (given name) =

Charles Phelps may refer to:

- Charles Phelps Taft (1843–1929), American lawyer and politician
- Charles Phelps Taft II (1897–1983), Republican mayor of Cincinnati, Ohio
- Charles Phelps Norton (1858–1920), chancellor of the University of Buffalo (1909–1920)

== See also ==
- Charles Phelps (disambiguation)
