= Mansour F. Armaly =

Palestinian-American physician

Mansour F. Armaly

Mansour F. Armaly (February 25, 1927 – August 19, 2005) was a Palestinian-American physician who researched the treatment of glaucoma.

== Early life and education ==
Armaly was born in Shefa Amr, Palestine on February 25, 1927, the eldest of eight children. Armaly grew up in Haifa, where he completed his elementary and high school education.

He received his B.A. (1947) and M.D. (1951) from the American University of Beirut in Lebanon. In 1948, his family sought refuge with him in Lebanon after the founding of the state of Israel.

== Career ==
After completing his residency in Beirut at the American University Hospital, Armaly left in 1955 to attend the University of Iowa, from which he received a M.Sc. in ophthalmology in 1957. Armaly became an American citizen and joined the university's faculty in 1958, where he remained for 13 years.

In 1970, he accepted a position as professor and chairman of the Department of Ophthalmology at the George Washington University Medical Center, in Washington, D.C., serving in that role for 27 years, until 1996. From 1980 to 1987, Armaly served as President of the Pan-American Glaucoma Society.

== Death ==
Armaly died of cancer at the hospital where he had long worked, at the age of 78. He was survived by his wife of 55 years, Aida Armaly, and his two children, Fareed Armaly, an artist in Berlin, and Raya Armaly Harrison, an ophthalmologist in Columbia, Maryland.

== Honours and legacy ==
In 1973, Armaly was decorated as a Knight of the National Order of the Cedar, Lebanon's highest state honour.

Two lectureships were established in Armaly's name with gifts from the family: The Mansour F. Armaly Lecture at The University of Iowa, and The Armaly Lecture at the American University in Beirut.

The Lecture Recipients at the University of Iowa have been nominated since 2004, beginning with Robert N. Weinreb. The inaugural Armaly lecture in Beirut was given by Wallace L.M. Alward in 2012.

== Selection of scholarly publications ==
- The cup-disc ratio. The findings of tonometry and tonography in the normal eye, Arch Ophthalmol. 1969 Aug;82(2):191-6, Armaly MF, Sayegh RE
- GENETIC FACTORS RELATED TO GLAUCOMA, Annals of the New York Academy of Sciences, Volume 151 Issue 1, Pages 861 – 874, Mansour F. Armaly
- The Effect of Pilocarpine Ocusert With Different Release Rates on Ocular Pressure, Investigative Ophthalmology and Visual Science. 1973;12:491–496, Mansour F. Armaly and K. R. RAO
- The Des Momes population Study of Glaucoma, Investigative Ophthalmology and Visual Science. 1962;1:618–628, Mansour F. Armaly

== References and external links ==
further Obituaries:

- "Glaucoma Researcher Mansour F. Armaly, 78, Dies," Washington Post, August 25, 2005.
- American-Arab Anti-Discrimination Committee Obituary
