= Chuck Phelps =

American Baptist pastor

Dr. Charles Phelps, more commonly known as Chuck, is an American Baptist pastor. He has worked in the ministry for over thirty years, and currently is the senior pastor at Colonial Hills Baptist Church in Indianapolis. Prior to working in Indianapolis, he pastored a Baptist church in Concord, New Hampshire, United States, for several years. He was the head of the church during, and was alleged to be involved in a cover-up of, the Trinity Baptist Church sex scandal. According to news reports, Charles Phelps requested a 15-year-old victim apologize to the church and to her rapist's wife for her rape by a deacon in the church. He became the president of Maranatha Baptist Bible College in 2007 and was replaced in 2010. He also served on his alma mater Bob Jones University's Board of Trustees prior to 2011.

He is married to Linda Phelps, and has five children. His son, who was the youth pastor of Colonial Hills, was killed in a bus accident along with two other church members in July 2013.
