= Fareed Armaly =

American artist

Fareed Armaly (born 1957 in Iowa) is an American artist, curator, author and editor who lives and works in the United States and Berlin, Europe. Starting in the late 1980s, his work introduced a focus on the open definition of contemporary artistic practice as the medium itself, well-suited towards rendering a contemporary syntax from issues pertaining to a politics of culture, identity and representation.

His initial wider recognition came in relation to 'Kontext Kunst'|| a term coined by a 1993 seminal group exhibition/publication. Armaly's work is unique in confounding genre, his focus on artistic practice is methodologically expansive, including a range of interdisciplinary-based exhibitions, collaborative projects as well the longer-term roles and positions within the art institutional framework.

== Work method ==
Armaly's exhibition projects can be described in terms of how they draw together working fields and relations, that connect between different categories of enquiry and methods of exposition. Their subject is reflected within and constituted through each project's particular type of scripted construction.

A hallmark of these constructions is that a project 'identity' emerges from a dynamic aggregate. The attention is drawn from what is 'exhibited' onto the correspondences between them, and renders the effect of perceiving these interweaved associations as the experience itself.

From / To, Documenta 11 version

Graphical guiding systems, wall texts and resource publication operate as a dialog, suggesting the constant triangulation of the locus of the artwork. By offering analytical passages through, more 'situationist' than 'site', these construct rather than illustrate. Their new construction material is derived from a synthesis of programming codes, a script joining media, architecture, computer, working with historical material, archives, resource interviews as social histories. A description of the architecture housing the exhibition may instead reveal an alternate narrative, that shifts from the sense of a structure and materiality onto a social-political realm. As a strategy this re-coding enables to reintroduce the construction in mind as an interface to a particular institutional matrix. It is within this interface that the diverse, new productions for the exhibition are located, and which establishes the project's contemporary spatial narrative.

== Artistic practice ==
Armaly's methodology takes the open definition of artistic practice as the medium by which to render the dynamics operating within a politics of representation. He sets this in relation to issues pertaining to culture, identity, nation and narration, by initially establishing key thematic lines of enquiry, which create a network of correspondences. These all offer expressions of the constant modeling of culture and society, and considers within that the attempts towards institutionalization of certain discourses and conventions that focus audiences and communities-of-interest. Key examples of this include the history of TV vs. music recording culture shaping national community vs. audiences; representation of the Arab 'Other' relative to United States politics; the role of the arts in society, as it appears in the convergence of experimental poetics in alignment to emancipatory strategies in culture and politics, and in link to that, a relation between institution and institutionalization.

The first productions, self-published music/culture journals Terminal Zone and R.O.O.M. (1987–89), introduced a reflection of his US context in terms of recording media culture. It transposes a search for a contemporary art syntax onto a music/culture magazine, whose new hybrid format is generated in terms of a changing philosophy: sample, mix, cut and paste, d.i.y. cross-over, etc. The publication's assemblage of archival material, essays, oral histories with seminal musicians reflects the artist's generational identity politics, through positions that allow to be brought together in “thought-communities”, and link the everyday- and pop-culture through specific terms like 'nation' and 'narration'.

European invitations shifted the focus clearly onto art institutions. Works such as displaced passages (1988) or the solo exhibition (re)orient (1989) bridged the U.S. and Europe by reflecting on the shared institutionalization of an Orientalist, Western-based epistemology. That representational closure is exemplified in these works through collected artifacts, as ready-mades. Most entail a mistake-in-production that create “gaps” in the seamless logic, from which Armaly then initiates a new charting.

Larger institutional solo exhibition projects, such as Orphée 1990 (1990), and Brea-kd-own (1993) produce situationist archeologies' along fault-lines in the institutional foundations, revealing within layers of cultural connotations from cinema, television, architecture, music, text and design. The narrative premise that guides this situation, mirrors the artist's personal reflections on how to enter today into the space offered by these institutions. An access way develops through considering a spatiality of interrupted historical transitions. In these two examples of grand art institutional frameworks each project introduces a tenuous transitional space within. It works with the visibly evident remainders left of areas configured from post-May'68 cultural policies, to construct a perspective onto the current post-1989 transitional setting.

== Open network concepts ==
Armaly establishes an interplay between cultural fields and strategies, where each project is generated by a specific type of 'scripting of correspondences’ between. The approach links to a notion of a potential 'unfinishedness' implicit in the dynamic between culture and identity, from which to consider a politics of representation that constantly finds creative openings in the linking between art, culture and society. This philosophy can also be evidenced by the different roles and positions the artist has held within the art institutional system, including long-term artistic/curatorial advisory collaborations for large-scale institutional projects, such as Project UNITE (1993); ? / NowHere (1996).

haus.0, Künstlerhaus Stuttgart, 2001

By 1999 three types of large-scale projects are operating: Program (1998) configured a relation to a 'public' by intersecting three public programs (university, national television, and public art), and a TV work offering a recollection of broadcast media pasts that in turn generates passages through a contemporary character of transitional, post-1989 Germany. From/to (1999 Witte de With /2002 documenta11), the large-scale, institutional project series, combined exhibition, panels, screenings, and commissions from different fields, in order to materialize the speculative charting of paradoxical discourses generated by post-1948 Palestinian refugee movement: a 'map unfolding in real time'. haus.0 (1999–2003) which drew together earlier experiences into Armaly's four-year, international programming concept as Artistic Director for the institution Künstlerhaus Stuttgart, an artists-space founded in the 1980s and by 1999 in transition.

Armaly's solo and collaborative works include his production of video, soundworks, architectural interventions, design, sculpture, installation, performative and event, as well as publications. Their overall interdisciplinary character and sense of process, continues further in projects including the artist's first U.S. solo exhibition, Orient(n)ations (2004) and Shar(e)d Domains (2007) a commission by the Musée d'Art et d'Histoire (Geneva) for their large-scale archaeological exhibition and new museum proposal, Gaza at the crossroad of civilizations.

A 2007 publication on Armaly's practice by the art historian Helmut Draxler, aptly sums up the works’ unique attitude and the artist's overall sensibility by the books title, Coercing Constellations.

== Awards ==
In 2024 Armaly rejected the Academy of Arts, Berlin's Käthe Kollwitz prize, citing as his reasons "a disturbing trend of censorship in Germany" and a "reactionary shift in official cultural policies, aimed at silencing advocates for Palestinian rights."

== Selected exhibitions ==
- 2021 The (re)Orient (2023) in 'Enjoy - The mumok Collection in change', mumok (museum moderner kunst stiftung ludwig wien), Vienna, A
- 2015/2016 Contact (1992/2015) in 'to expose, to show, to demonstrate, to inform, to offer', mumok (museum moderner kunst stiftung ludwig wien), Vienna, A
- 2015 Project Space Architecture for the year long program Place.Labour.Capital. at the NTU Centre for Contemporary Art, Singapore
- 2007 Shar(e)d Domains, in 'Gaza at the Crossroad of Civilisations', Musée d'art et d'histoire, Geneva, CH
- 2004 Orient(n)ations, ArtPace, San Antonio, USA
- 2002 From/to, Documenta11, Kassel, D
- 2000-01 Architectures of Discourse, 2001, Foundation Tàpies, ES
- 1999-02 haus.0, four-year program as Artistic Director, Künstlerhaus Stuttgart, D
- 1999 From/to, Witte de With, Rotterdam, NL.
- 1997 Parts, Kunstverein München, Munich, D
- 1995-96 ?, (in NowHere), Louisiana Museum, DK, Curator Ute Meta Bauer, participation as Co-Curator / Artist
- 1995 Scale, Forum Stadtpark Prag, Prague, CR
- 1993 BREA-KD-OWN, Palais des Beaux-Arts, Brussels, B
- 1992-93 Project Unité, Firminy, F, Curator: Yves Aupetitalot
- 1992 Contact, Galerie Nagel, Cologne, D
- 1990 Orphée 1990, Maison de la Culture et de la Communication, Saint-Etienne, F
- 1989 (re)Orient, Galerie Lorenz, Paris, F
- 1988 Wechselkurse, Galerie Dürr, Munich, D
- 1987 Publications: Terminal Zone / R.O.O.M.

== Bibliography ==
- "The (re)Orient (2023)", Produced on the occasion of Fareed Armaly’s update of The (re)Orient (1989) in 2021 at mumok, Vienna.
- "Die Gewalt des Zusammenhangs / Coercing Constellations", b_books, Berlin, 2007, Helmut Draxler
- "Obsidian chunks, a vitrious mass, a broken sundial and an object lesson", The Daily Star, Beirut, 2007, Kaelen Wilson-Goldie
- "Netzwerke der Erkenntnis", taz (die tageszeitung), 2002, Dietrich Heissenbüttel
- "The Allegorical Impulse of the Curator", Springerin, 2001, H.Draxler
- Vogel, S. (1994). "Fareed Armaly - Palais des Beaux Arts, Brussels". Artforum. 32 (9). Archived from the original on September 14, 2004 – via FindArticles.
