= 1956 United States House of Representatives elections in Nebraska =

- November 6, 1956

All 4 Nebraska seats to the United States House of Representatives
	Majority party	Minority party
Party	Republican	Democratic
Last election	4	0
Seats won	4	0
Seat change	Steady	Steady
Popular vote	323,641	220,372
Percentage	59.23%	40.33%

The 1956 United States House of Representatives elections in Nebraska were held on November 6, 1956, to elect the state of Nebraska's four members to the United States House of Representatives.

== Overview ==
1956 United States House of Representatives elections in Nebraska
Party	Votes	Percentage	Seats	+/–
Republican	323,641	59.23%	4	Steady
Democratic	220,372	40.33%	0	Steady
Independent	2,389	0.44%	0	—
Write-ins	27	0.00%	0	—
Totals	546,429	100.00%	4	—

== District 1 ==
Incumbent Republican Congressman Phil Weaver ran for re-election to a second term. He defeated Richard Johnson, a student and U.S. Marine Corps veteran, in the Republican primary, and was challenged by perennial candidate Samuel Freeman, the Democratic nominee, in the general election. Weaver defeated Freeman in a landslide, winning re-election with 67 percent of the vote.

=== Republican primary ===
==== Candidates ====
- Phil Weaver, incumbent U.S. Representative
- Richard W. Johnson, University of Nebraska student, U.S. Marine Corps veteran

==== Results ====
Republican primary results
Party	Candidate	Votes	%
Republican	Phil Weaver (inc.)	21,673	72.98%
Republican	Richard W. Johnson	8,023	27.02%
Republican	Write-ins	2	0.01%
Total votes		29,698	100.00%

=== Democratic primary ===
==== Candidates ====
- Samuel Freeman, perennial candidate
- Clair A. Callan, businessman

==== Results ====
Democratic primary results
Party	Candidate	Votes	%
Democratic	Samuel Freeman	8,214	56.52%
Democratic	Clair A. Callan	6,318	43.48%
Total votes		14,532	100.00%

=== General election ===
==== Candidates ====
- Phil Weaver (Republican)
- Samuel Freeman (Democratic)

==== Results ====
1956 Nebraska's 1st congressional district general election results
Party	Candidate	Votes	%
Republican	Phil Weaver (inc.)	102,012	66.95%
Democratic	Samuel Freeman	50,351	33.05%
Write-ins		6	0.00%
Total votes		152,369	100.00%
Republican hold			

== District 2 ==
Incumbent Republican Congressman Jackson B. Chase declined to seek re-election to a second term, observing that he "had no intention of seeking a second term," and instead sought to return to the Fourth Judicial District Court, where he had served prior to his election in 1954. Former Omaha Mayor Glenn Cunningham won the Republican primary and faced former State Senator Joseph Benesch, who narrowly won the Democratic primary, and independent Al Misegadis in the general election. Cunningham defeated Benesch, winning his first term with 53 percent of the vote to Benesch's 45 percent.

=== Republican primary ===
==== Candidates ====
- Glenn Cunningham, former Mayor of Omaha
- Warren R. Swigart, Omaha City Councilman, Public Property Commissioner
- Paul S. Kruger, campaign staffer
- William H. Thomas, attorney
- Tom P. Epsen, businessman

==== Results ====
Republican primary results
Party	Candidate	Votes	%
Republican	Glenn Cunningham	9,297	36.50%
Republican	Warren R. Swigart	6,078	23.86%
Republican	Paul S. Kruger	5,431	21.32%
Republican	William H. Thomas	3,395	13.33%
Republican	Tom P. Epsen	1,271	4.99%
Republican	Write-ins	1	0.00%
Total votes		25,473	100.00%

=== Democratic primary ===
==== Candidates ====
- Joseph Benesch, former State Senator, 1954 Democratic candidate for the U.S. Senate
- Philip A. Allen, news reporter, 1946 Democratic nominee for Iowa's 7th congressional district
- Mabel Gillespie, former State Representative, 1954 Democratic candidate for the U.S. Senate
- Clayton Shrout, attorney, former Chairman of the Nebraska Democratic Party
- J. Emmet McArdle, farmer

==== Results ====
Democratic primary results
Party	Candidate	Votes	%
Democratic	Joseph Benesch	5,260	24.88%
Democratic	Philip A. Allen	5,186	24.53%
Democratic	Mabel Gillespie	4,762	22.53%
Democratic	Clayton Shrout	2,971	14.05%
Democratic	J. Emmet McArdle	2,958	13.99%
Democratic	Write-ins	3	0.01%
Total votes		21,140	100.00%

=== General election ===
==== Candidates ====
- Glenn Cunningham (Republican)
- Joseph Benesch (Democratic)
- Al Misegadis (Independent)

==== Results ====
1956 Nebraska's 2nd congressional district general election results
Party	Candidate	Votes	%
Republican	Glenn Cunningham	77,253	53.39%
Democratic	Joseph Benesch	65,039	44.95%
Independent	Al Misegadis	2,389	1.65%
Write-ins		12	0.01%
Total votes		144,693	100.00%
Republican hold			

== District 3 ==
Incumbent Republican Congressman R. D. Harrison ran for re-election to another term. He was challenged in the Republican primary by State Senator Lester Anderson and former South Sioux City Mayor Merle Haynes. Harrison won the primary with a narrow majority, receiving 51 percent of the vote, and advanced to the general election, where he was opposed by Democratic nominee Lawrence Brock, the former Chairman of the Nebraska Democratic Party. Harrison only narrowly defeated Brock, winning by just 246 votes. Brock considered contesting the election before the U.S. House Committee on Elections, but ultimately conceded the race.

=== Republican primary ===
==== Candidates ====
- R. D. Harrison, incumbent U.S. Representative
- Merle A. Haynes, former Mayor of South Sioux City
- Lester H. Anderson, State Senator
- E. A. Carlson, farmer

==== Results ====
Republican primary results
Party	Candidate	Votes	%
Republican	R. D. Harrison (inc.)	12,193	50.53%
Republican	Merle A. Haynes	5,543	22.97%
Republican	Lester H. Anderson	3,977	16.48%
Republican	E. A. Carlson	2,415	10.01%
Republican	Write-ins	1	0.00%
Total votes		24,129	100.00%

=== Democratic primary ===
==== Candidates ====
- Lawrence Brock, former Chairman of the Nebraska Democratic Party
- Ernest M. Luther, farmer, 1954 Democratic nominee for Congress
- Jesse F. Tepner, automobile dealer, 1954 Democratic candidate for Congress

==== Results ====
Democratic primary results
Party	Candidate	Votes	%
Democratic	Lawrence Brock	6,522	47.35%
Democratic	Ernest M. Luther	4,388	31.85%
Democratic	Jesse F. Tepner	2,865	20.80%
Total votes		13,775	100.00%

=== General election ===
==== Candidates ====
- R. D. Harrison (Republican)
- Lawrence Brock (Democratic)

==== Results ====
1956 Nebraska's 3rd congressional district general election results
Party	Candidate	Votes	%
Republican	R. D. Harrison (inc.)	62,645	50.10%
Democratic	Lawrence Brock	62,399	49.90%
Scattering		1	0.00%
Total votes		125,045	100.00%
Republican hold			

== District 4 ==
Incumbent Republican Congressman Arthur L. Miller ran for re-election. He won the Republican primary in a landslide over dentist Howard Eby, and was challenged by Carlton W. Laird, his Democratic opponent from 1954, in the general election. Miller defeated Laird by a wide margin, winning 66 percent of the vote to Laird's 34 percent.

=== Republican primary ===
==== Candidates ====
- Arthur L. Miller, incumbent U.S. Representative
- Howard F. Eby, dentist

==== Results ====
Republican primary results
Party	Candidate	Votes	%
Republican	Arthur L. Miller (inc.)	20,927	85.84%
Republican	Howard F. Eby	3,449	14.15%
Republican	Scattering	3	0.01%
Total votes		24,379	100.00%

=== Democratic primary ===
==== Candidates ====
- Carlton W. Laird, factory manager, 1954 Democratic nominee for Congress

==== Results ====
Democratic primary results
Party	Candidate	Votes	%
Democratic	Carlton W. Laird	10,750	99.92%
Democratic	Scattering	9	0.08%
Total votes		10,759	100.00%

=== General election ===
==== Candidates ====
- Arthur L. Miller (Republican)
- Carlton W. Laird (Democratic)

==== Results ====
1956 Nebraska's 4th congressional district general election results
Party	Candidate	Votes	%
Republican	Arthur L. Miller (inc.)	81,731	65.74%
Democratic	Carlton W. Laird	42,583	34.25%
Scattering		8	0.01%
Total votes		124,322	100.00%
Republican hold			

== See also ==
- 1956 United States House of Representatives elections
