= 1954 United States House of Representatives elections in Nebraska =

- November 2, 1954

All 4 Nebraska seats to the United States House of Representatives
| | Majority party | Minority party |
|---|---|---|
| Party | Republican | Democratic |
| Last election | 4 | 0 |
| Seats won | 4 | 0 |
| Seat change | Steady | Steady |
| Popular vote | 250,347 | 156,343 |
| Percentage | 61.56% | 38.44% |

The 1954 United States House of Representatives elections in Nebraska were held on November 2, 1954, to elect the state of Nebraska's four members to the United States House of Representatives.

== Overview ==
1954 United States House of Representatives elections in Nebraska
| Party | Votes | Percentage | Seats | +/– |
|---|---|---|---|---|
| Republican | 250,347 | 61.56% | 4 | Steady |
| Democratic | 156,343 | 38.44% | 0 | Steady |
| Write-ins | 2 | 0.00% | 0 | — |
| Totals | 406,692 | 100.00% | 4 | — |

== District 1 ==
Incumbent Republican Congressman Carl Curtis opted to successfully run for the U.S. Senate rather than seek re-election. After his election, Curtis was appointed to the Senate on January 1, 1955, following the resignation of lame-duck Senator Hazel Abel. Businessman Phil Weaver, an automobile dealer and the son of former Governor Arthur J. Weaver, won the Republican primary over attorney Ira Beynon and former State Senator Murray Rickard. In the general election, he was opposed by former Frontier County Attorney Frank B. Morrison, the Democratic nominee. Weaver defeated Morrison by a wide margin, receiving 59 percent of the vote to Morrison's 41 percent.

=== Republican primary ===
==== Candidates ====
- Phil Weaver, automobile dealer, son of former Governor Arthur J. Weaver
- Ira D. Beynon, attorney
- Murray F. Rickard, former State Senator

==== Results ====
Republican primary results
| Party | Candidate | Votes | % |
|---|---|---|---|
| Republican | Phil Weaver | 26,249 | 56.46% |
| Republican | Ira D. Beynon | 16,585 | 35.67% |
| Republican | Murray F. Rickard | 3,657 | 7.87% |
| Republican | Scattering | 1 | 0.00% |
| Total votes | | 46,492 | 100.00% |

=== Democratic primary ===
==== Candidates ====
- Frank B. Morrison, former Frontier County Attorney, 1950 Democratic candidate for Governor
- Samuel Freeman, perennial candidate

==== Results ====
Democratic primary results
| Party | Candidate | Votes | % |
|---|---|---|---|
| Democratic | Frank B. Morrison | 13,165 | 72.30% |
| Democratic | Samuel Freeman | 5,043 | 27.70% |
| Democratic | Scattering | 1 | 0.01% |
| Total votes | | 18,209 | 100.00% |

=== General election ===
==== Candidates ====
- Phil Weaver (Republican)
- Frank B. Morrison (Democratic)

==== Results ====
1954 Nebraska's 1st congressional district general election results
| Party | Candidate | Votes | % |
|---|---|---|---|
| Republican | Phil Weaver | 68,563 | 58.59% |
| Democratic | Frank B. Morrison | 48,457 | 41.41% |
| Total votes | | 117,020 | 100.00% |
| Republican hold | | | |

== District 2 ==
Incumbent Republican Congressman Roman Hruska initially ran for re-election to a second term, but following the death of Senator Hugh A. Butler, withdrew from his re-election campaign to instead successfully run in the special election to serve out the remainder of Butler's term. Judge Jackson B. Chase, a member of the Fourth Judicial District Court and a former State Representative, was selected to fill Hruska's place on the primary ballot. In the general election, Chase was challenged by attorney Robert Hart, the 1952 Democratic nominee against Hruska. Chase ultimately defeated Hart, but by a reduced margin from Hruska's victory two years prior, winning 53 percent of the vote to Hart's 47 percent.

=== Republican primary ===
==== Candidates ====
- Jackson B. Chase, Judge of the Fourth Judicial District Court, former State Representative

==== Results ====
Republican primary results
| Party | Candidate | Votes | % |
|---|---|---|---|
| Republican | Jackson B. Chase | 23,132 | 99.87% |
| Republican | Scattering | 30 | 0.13% |
| Total votes | | 23,162 | 100.00% |

=== Democratic primary ===
==== Candidates ====
- James A. Hart, attorney, 1952 Democratic nominee for Congress, 1950 Democratic nominee for Congress from Iowa's 7th congressional district

==== Results ====
Democratic primary results
| Party | Candidate | Votes | % |
|---|---|---|---|
| Democratic | James A. Hart | 18,933 | 99.97% |
| Democratic | Scattering | 6 | 0.03% |
| Total votes | | 18,939 | 100.00% |

=== General election ===
==== Candidates ====
- Jackson B. Chase (Republican)
- James A. Hart (Democratic)

==== Results ====
1954 Nebraska's 2nd congressional district general election results
| Party | Candidate | Votes | % |
|---|---|---|---|
| Republican | Jackson B. Chase | 52,471 | 52.95% |
| Democratic | James A. Hart | 46,629 | 47.05% |
| Scattering | | 2 | 0.00% |
| Total votes | | 99,102 | 100.00% |
| Republican hold | | | |

== District 3 ==
Incumbent Republican Congressman R. D. Harrison ran for re-election to a third term. He defeated attorney Edward Robins in the Republican primary, and was challenged by cattle feeder Ernest Luther, the Democratic nominee, in the general election. Harrison defeated Luther in a landslide, winning 65 percent of the vote to Luther's 35 percent.

=== Republican primary ===
==== Candidates ====
- R. D. Harrison, incumbent U.S. Representative
- Edward J. Robins, attorney, former member of the Nebraska Aeronautics Commission

==== Results ====
Republican primary results
| Party | Candidate | Votes | % |
|---|---|---|---|
| Republican | Robert D. Harrison (inc.) | 24,793 | 78.95% |
| Republican | Edward J. Robins | 6,610 | 21.05% |
| Total votes | | 31,403 | 100.00% |

=== Democratic primary ===
==== Candidates ====
- Ernest M. Luther, cattle feeder
- Jesse F. Tepner, automobile dealer

==== Results ====
Democratic primary results
| Party | Candidate | Votes | % |
|---|---|---|---|
| Democratic | Ernest M. Luther | 7,465 | 58.25% |
| Democratic | Jesse F. Tepner | 5,350 | 41.74% |
| Democratic | Scattering | 1 | 0.01% |
| Total votes | | 12,816 | 100.00% |

=== General election ===
==== Candidates ====
- R. D. Harrison (Republican)
- Ernest M. Luther (Democratic)

==== Results ====
1954 Nebraska's 3rd congressional district general election results
| Party | Candidate | Votes | % |
|---|---|---|---|
| Republican | R. D. Harrison (inc.) | 61,124 | 65.24% |
| Democratic | Ernest M. Luther | 32,562 | 34.76% |
| Total votes | | 93,686 | 100.00% |
| Republican hold | | | |

== District 4 ==
Incumbent Republican Congressman Arthur L. Miller ran for re-election to a seventh term. He was challenged in the general election by engineer Carlton Laird, the Democratic nominee. Miller defeated Laird in a landslide, receiving 70 percent of the vote to Laird's 30 percent.

=== Republican primary ===
==== Candidates ====
- Arthur L. Miller, incumbent U.S. Representative

==== Results ====
Republican primary results
| Party | Candidate | Votes | % |
|---|---|---|---|
| Republican | Arthur L. Miller (inc.) | 37,800 | 99.98% |
| Republican | Scattering | 6 | 0.02% |
| Total votes | | 37,806 | 100.00% |

=== Democratic primary ===
==== Candidates ====
- Carlton W. Laird, engineer

==== Results ====
Democratic primary results
| Party | Candidate | Votes | % |
|---|---|---|---|
| Democratic | Carlton W. Laird | 12,258 | 99.94% |
| Democratic | Scattering | 7 | 0.06% |
| Total votes | | 12,265 | 100.00% |

=== General election ===
==== Candidates ====
- Arthur L. Miller (Republican)
- Carlton W. Laird (Democratic)

==== Results ====
1954 Nebraska's 4th congressional district general election results
| Party | Candidate | Votes | % |
|---|---|---|---|
| Republican | Arthur L. Miller (inc.) | 68,189 | 70.38% |
| Democratic | Carlton W. Laird | 28,695 | 29.62% |
| Total votes | | 96,884 | 100.00% |
| Republican hold | | | |

== See also ==
- 1954 United States House of Representatives elections
