= 83rd United States Congress =

1953–1955 U.S. Congress

←	82nd	84th	→
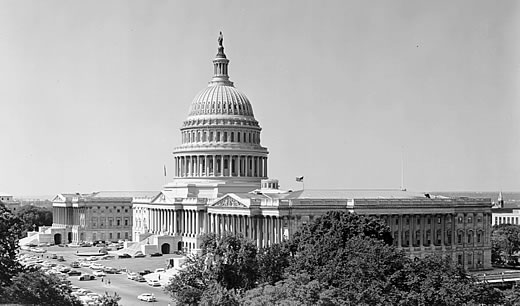
- United States Capitol (1956)

Overview
- Legislative body: United States Congress
- Jurisdiction: United States
- Term: January 3, 1953 – January 3, 1955

Senate
- Members: 96
- President: Alben W. Barkley (D) (Note: U.S. Vice President Alben W. Barkley's term as President of the Senate ended at noon January 20, 1953, when Richard Nixon's term began.) (until January 20, 1953); Richard Nixon (R) (from January 20, 1953)
- President pro tempore: Styles Bridges (R)
- Party control: Republican (‘til Session 1’s last week and all of Session 2 but 3 days by VP & caucus)

House of Representatives
- Members: 435 representatives 3 non-voting delegates
- Speaker: Joseph W. Martin Jr. (R)
- Party control: Republican

Sessions
- 1st: January 3, 1953 – August 3, 1953
- 2nd: January 6, 1954 – December 2, 1954

The 83rd United States Congress was a meeting of the legislative branch of the federal government of the United States in Washington, D.C. from January 3, 1953, until January 3, 1955, during the last two weeks of the Truman administration, with the remainder spanning the first two years of Dwight Eisenhower's presidency. It was composed of the Senate and the House of Representatives. The apportionment of seats in the House was based on the 1950 U.S. census.

The Republicans gained the majority in both chambers, winning back full control of Congress for the first time since the 80th Congress in 1947, and with Dwight Eisenhower being sworn in as president on January 20, 1953, this gave the Republicans an overall federal government trifecta for the first time since the 71st Congress in 1929, and the last time until they briefly did so during the 107th Congress in 2001.

== Major events ==
- January 20, 1953: Dwight Eisenhower is sworn in as President of the United States in his first inauguration
- March 1, 1954: U.S. Capitol shooting incident
- December 2, 1954: Joseph McCarthy is censured by the U.S. Senate

== Major legislation ==
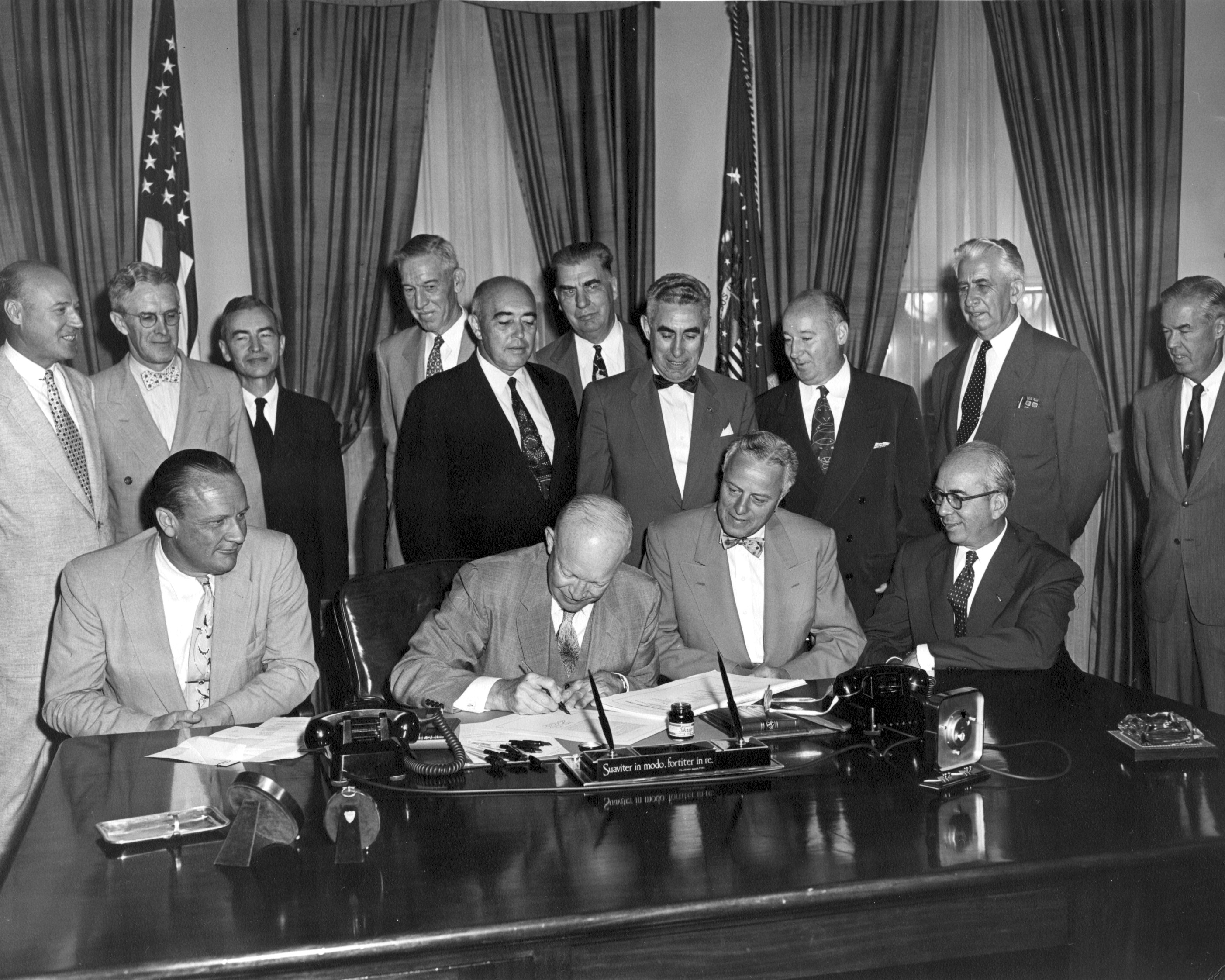
President Eisenhower signs the Atomic Energy Act of 1954.

- July 3, 1953: Small Business Act, Pub. L. 83–163, ch. 282, 67 Stat. 232
- August 7, 1953: Refugee Relief Act, Pub. L. 83–203
- August 7, 1953: Submerged Lands Act, ch. 345, 67 Stat. 462
- August 14, 1953: Public Law 280, Pub. L. 83–280, 18 U.S.C. § 1162
- May 13, 1954: Saint Lawrence Seaway Act, ch. 201, 68 Stat. 92
- August 12, 1954: Federal National Mortgage Association Charter Act, ch. 649, title II, §201, 68 Stat. 612
- August 13, 1954: Multiple Mineral Development Act, ch. 730, 68 Stat. 708
- August 16, 1954: Internal Revenue Code of 1954, Pub. L. 83–591, ch. 736, 68A Stat. 3
  - Federal Unemployment Tax Act, §1(d), 68A Stat. 439
  - National Firearms Act, §1(d), 68A Stat. 721
- August 24, 1954: Communist Control Act of 1954, ch. 886, 68 Stat. 775
- August 30, 1954: Atomic Energy Act of 1954, 68 Stat. 919
- 1954: Agricultural Act of 1954
- 1954: Water Facilities Act of 1954

== Party summary ==
Until the last week of the first session of Congress, Republicans had a 48-47-1 tied-plurality in the Senate which Republican Vice President Richard Nixon broke in the GOP’s favor. At the start of the second session, to account for whenever the Senate became tied 47-47-1 or when the Democrats held the plurality the Republican-turned-Independent, Wayne Morse, caucused with the GOP which gave them a tie-breaking majority, allowing continuity in GOP control of the Senate and the overall trifecta of government. Thus Republican leader William Knowland remained Senate Majority Leader, Democratic leader Lyndon B. Johnson remained Senate Minority Leader, and the GOP remained continuously in control of the Senate committees. Wayne Morse would begin caucusing with Democrats at the start of the next Congress in 1955 to give them Senate control.

=== Senate ===
Affiliation	Party (Shading indicates majority caucus)			Total	
Affiliation	Democratic	Independent	Republican	Total	Vacant
End of previous Congress	47	—	48	95	1
Begin	47	1	48	96	—
June 26, 1953 (Note: In North Carolina, Class 2 senator Willis Smith (D) died June 26, 1953, and Alton Lennon (D), was appointed July 10, 1953, to continue the term. Lennon lost the special election and W. Kerr Scott (D) was elected November 2, 1954 to finish the term.)	46	1	48	95	1
July 10, 1953	47	1	48	96	—
July 24, 1953 (Note: In New Hampshire, Charles W. Tobey (R) died July 24, 1953, and Robert W. Upton (R), was appointed August 14, 1953, to continue the term. Upton lost the special election and Norris Cotton (R) was elected November 2, 1954 to finish the term, but was ineligible until resigning from the House November 8, 1954.)	47	1	47	95	1
July 31, 1953 (Note: In Ohio, Robert A. Taft (R) died July 31, 1953, and Thomas A. Burke (D), was appointed November 10, 1953, to continue the term. Burke lost the special election and George H. Bender (R) was elected November 2, 1954 to finish the term, but was ineligible until resigning from the House December 15, 1954.)	47	1	46	94	2
August 14, 1953	47	1	47	95	1
November 10, 1953	48	1	47	96	—
January 6, 1954 (Note: Independent Wayne Morse begins caucusing with Republicans at the start of the second session of Congress.)	48	1	47	96	—
April 12, 1954 (Note: In Nebraska, Class 2 senator Dwight Griswold (R) died April 12, 1954, and Eva Bowring (R), was appointed April 16, 1954, to continue the term. Bowring did not run in the special election and Hazel Abel (R) was elected November 2, 1954 to finish the term. Abel resigned December 31, 1954 and her successor to the next term, Carl Curtis (R), was appointed January 1, 1955.)	48	1	46	95	1
April 16, 1954	48	1	47	96	—
May 12, 1954 (Note: In North Carolina, Class 3 senator Clyde R. Hoey (D) died May 12, 1954, and Sam Ervin (D), was appointed June 5, 1954, to continue the term. Ervin would then be elected in November 1954 to finish the term.)	47	1	47	95	1
June 5, 1954	48	1	47	96	—
June 19, 1954 (Note: In Wyoming, Lester C. Hunt (D) died June 19, 1954, and Edward D. Crippa (R), was appointed June 24, 1954, to continue the term. did not run in the special election and Joseph C. O'Mahoney (D) was elected November 2, 1954 to finish the term.)	47	1	47	95	1
June 24, 1954	47	1	48	96	—
July 1, 1954 (Note: In Nebraska, Class 1 senator Hugh A. Butler (R) died July 1, 1954, and Samuel W. Reynolds (R), was appointed July 3, 1954, to continue the term. Reynolds did not run in the special election and Roman Hruska (R) was elected November 2, 1954 to finish the term.)	47	1	47	95	1
July 3, 1954	47	1	48	96	—
September 1, 1954 (Note: In South Carolina, Burnet R. Maybank (D) died September 1, 1954, and Charles E. Daniel (D), was appointed September 6, 1954, to finish the term. Daniel resigned December 23, 1954 and his successor to the next term, Strom Thurmond (D), was appointed December 24, 1954.)	46	1	48	95	1
September 6, 1954	47	1	48	96	—
September 28, 1954 (Note: In Nevada, Pat McCarran (D) died September 28, 1954, and Ernest S. Brown (R), was appointed October 1, 1954, to continue the term. Brown lost the special election and Alan Bible (D) was elected November 2, 1954 to finish the term.)	46	1	48	95	1
October 1, 1954	46	1	49	96	—
November 2, 1954	47	1	48	96	—
November 2, 1954	48	1	47	96	—
December 15, 1954	47	1	48	96	—
December 23, 1954	46	1	48	95	1
December 24, 1954	47	1	48	96	—
December 31, 1954	47	1	47	95	1
January 1, 1955	47	1	48	96	—
Final voting share	49%	1%	50%		
Beginning of the next Congress	48	1	47	96	—

=== House of Representatives ===
Republican majority in the House becomes a plurality after the end of the last congressional session.

	Party (Shading indicates majority caucus)			Total	Vacant
	Democratic	Independent	Republican	Total	Vacant
End of previous Congress	228	1	198	427	8
Begin	211	1	221	433	2
End	212	1	213	426	9
Beginning of next Congress	231	0	203	434	1

== Leadership ==
=== Senate ===
- President: Alben W. Barkley (D), until January 20, 1953
  - Richard Nixon (R), from January 20, 1953
- President pro tempore: Styles Bridges (R)

==== Majority (Republican) leadership ====
- Majority Leader: Robert A. Taft, until July 31, 1953 (died)
  - William Knowland, from August 3, 1953
- Majority Whip: Leverett Saltonstall
- Republican Conference Chairman: Eugene Millikin
- Republican Conference Secretary: Milton Young
- National Senatorial Committee Chair: Everett Dirksen
- Policy Committee Chairman: Homer S. Ferguson

==== Minority (Democratic) leadership ====
- Minority Leader and Conference Chairman: Lyndon B. Johnson
- Minority Whip: Earle Clements
- Democratic Caucus Secretary: Thomas C. Hennings Jr.

=== House of Representatives ===
- Speaker: Joseph W. Martin Jr. (R)

==== Majority (Republican) leadership ====
- Majority Leader: Charles A. Halleck
- Majority Whip: Leslie C. Arends
- Republican Conference Chairman: Clifford R. Hope
- Policy Committee Chairman: Joseph W. Martin Jr.
- Republican Campaign Committee Chairman: Richard M. Simpson

==== Minority (Democratic) leadership ====
- Minority Leader: Sam Rayburn
- Minority Whip: John W. McCormack
- Democratic Caucus Chairman: Wilbur Mills
- Democratic Caucus Secretary: Edna F. Kelly
- Democratic Campaign Committee Chairman: Michael J. Kirwan

== Caucuses ==
- House Democratic Caucus
- Senate Democratic Caucus

== Members ==
=== Senate ===
Senators are popularly elected statewide every six years, with one-third beginning new six-year terms with each Congress. Within each state, senators are listed in order of seniority. Preceding the names in the list below are Senate class numbers, which indicate the cycle of their election, In this Congress, Class 2 meant their term ended with this Congress, facing re-election in 1954; Class 3 meant their term began in the last Congress, facing re-election in 1956; and Class 1 meant their term began in this Congress, facing re-election in 1958.

==== Alabama ====
▌2. John Sparkman (D)
▌3. J. Lister Hill (D)

==== Arizona ====
▌1. Barry Goldwater (R)
▌3. Carl Hayden (D)

==== Arkansas ====
▌2. John L. McClellan (D)
▌3. J. William Fulbright (D)

==== California ====
▌1. William Knowland (R)
▌3. Thomas Kuchel (R)

==== Colorado ====
▌2. Edwin C. Johnson (D)
▌3. Eugene Millikin (R)

==== Connecticut ====
▌1. William A. Purtell (R)
▌3. Prescott Bush (R)

==== Delaware ====
▌1. John J. Williams (R)
▌2. J. Allen Frear Jr. (D)

==== Florida ====
▌1. Spessard Holland (D)
▌3. George Smathers (D)

==== Georgia ====
▌2. Richard Russell Jr. (D)
▌3. Walter F. George (D)

==== Idaho ====
▌2. Henry Dworshak (R)
▌3. Herman Welker (R)

==== Illinois ====
▌2. Paul Douglas (D)
▌3. Everett Dirksen (R)

==== Indiana ====
▌1. William E. Jenner (R)
▌3. Homer E. Capehart (R)

==== Iowa ====
▌2. Guy M. Gillette (D)
▌3. Bourke B. Hickenlooper (R)

==== Kansas ====
▌2. Andrew Frank Schoeppel (R)
▌3. Frank Carlson (R)

==== Kentucky ====
▌2. John Sherman Cooper (R)
▌3. Earle Clements (D)

==== Louisiana ====
▌2. Allen J. Ellender (D)
▌3. Russell B. Long (D)

==== Maine ====
▌1. Frederick G. Payne (R)
▌2. Margaret Chase Smith (R)

==== Maryland ====
▌1. James Glenn Beall (R)
▌3. John Marshall Butler (R)

==== Massachusetts ====
▌1. John F. Kennedy (D)
▌2. Leverett Saltonstall (R)

==== Michigan ====
▌1. Charles E. Potter (R)
▌2. Homer S. Ferguson (R)

==== Minnesota ====
▌1. Edward John Thye (R)
▌2. Hubert Humphrey (DFL) (Note: The Minnesota Democratic–Farmer–Labor Party (DFL) is the Minnesota affiliate of the U.S. Democratic Party and are counted as Democrats.)

==== Mississippi ====
▌1. John C. Stennis (D)
▌2. James Eastland (D)

==== Missouri ====
▌1. Stuart Symington (D)
▌3. Thomas C. Hennings Jr. (D)

==== Montana ====
▌1. Mike Mansfield (D)
▌2. James E. Murray (D)

==== Nebraska ====
▌1. Hugh A. Butler (R), until July 1, 1954

▌Samuel W. Reynolds (R), July 3, 1954 – November 7, 1954
▌Roman Hruska (R), from November 8, 1954

▌2. Dwight Griswold (R), until April 12, 1954

▌Eva Bowring (R), April 16, 1954 – November 7, 1954
▌Hazel Abel (R), November 8, 1954 – December 31, 1954
▌Carl Curtis (R), from January 1, 1955

==== Nevada ====
▌1. George W. Malone (R)
▌3. Patrick A. McCarran (D), until September 28, 1954

▌Ernest S. Brown (R), October 1, 1954 – December 1, 1954
▌Alan Bible (D), from December 2, 1954

==== New Hampshire ====
▌2. Styles Bridges (R)
▌3. Charles W. Tobey (R), until July 24, 1953

▌Robert W. Upton (R), August 14, 1953 – November 7, 1954
▌Norris Cotton (R), from November 8, 1954

==== New Jersey ====
▌1. Howard Alexander Smith (R)
▌2. Robert C. Hendrickson (R)

==== New Mexico ====
▌1. Dennis Chávez (D)
▌2. Clinton P. Anderson (D)

==== New York ====
▌1. Irving Ives (R)
▌3. Herbert H. Lehman (D)

==== North Carolina ====
▌2. Willis Smith (D), until June 26, 1953

▌Alton Lennon (D), July 10, 1953 – November 28, 1954
▌W. Kerr Scott (D), from November 29, 1954

▌3. Clyde R. Hoey (D), until May 12, 1954

▌Sam Ervin (D), from June 5, 1954

==== North Dakota ====
▌1. William Langer (R-NPL)
▌3. Milton Young (R)

==== Ohio ====
▌1. John W. Bricker (R)
▌3. Robert A. Taft (R), until July 31, 1953

▌Thomas A. Burke (D), November 10, 1953 – December 2, 1954
▌George H. Bender (R), from December 16, 1954

==== Oklahoma ====
▌2. Robert S. Kerr (D)
▌3. A. S. Mike Monroney (D)

==== Oregon ====
▌2. Guy Cordon (R)
▌3. Wayne Morse (I)

==== Pennsylvania ====
▌1. Edward Martin (R)
▌3. James H. Duff (R)

==== Rhode Island ====
▌1. John Pastore (D)
▌2. Theodore F. Green (D)

==== South Carolina ====
▌2. Burnet R. Maybank (D), until September 1, 1954

▌Charles E. Daniel (D), September 6, 1954 – December 23, 1954
▌Strom Thurmond (D), from December 24, 1954

▌3. Olin D. Johnston (D)

==== South Dakota ====
▌2. Karl E. Mundt (R)
▌3. Francis Case (R)

==== Tennessee ====
▌1. Albert Gore Sr. (D)
▌2. Estes Kefauver (D)

==== Texas ====
▌1. Price Daniel (D)
▌2. Lyndon B. Johnson (D)

==== Utah ====
▌1. Arthur Vivian Watkins (R)
▌3. Wallace F. Bennett (R)

==== Vermont ====
▌1. Ralph Flanders (R)
▌3. George Aiken (R)

==== Virginia ====
▌1. Harry F. Byrd (D)
▌2. A. Willis Robertson (D)

==== Washington ====
▌1. Henry M. Jackson (D)
▌3. Warren G. Magnuson (D)

==== West Virginia ====
▌1. Harley M. Kilgore (D)
▌2. Matthew M. Neely (D)

==== Wisconsin ====
▌1. Joseph McCarthy (R)
▌3. Alexander Wiley (R)

==== Wyoming ====
▌1. Frank A. Barrett (R)
▌2. Lester C. Hunt (D), until June 19, 1954

▌Edward D. Crippa (R), June 24, 1954 – November 28, 1954
▌Joseph C. O'Mahoney (D), from November 29, 1954

Senators' party membership by state at the opening of the 83rd Congress in January 1953 2 Democrats 1 Democrat and 1 Republican 2 Republicans 1 Independent and 1 Republican

=== House of Representatives ===
==== Alabama ====
▌1. Frank W. Boykin (D)
▌2. George M. Grant (D)
▌3. George W. Andrews (D)
▌4. Kenneth A. Roberts (D)
▌5. Albert Rains (D)
▌6. Armistead Selden (D)
▌7. Carl Elliott (D)
▌8. Robert E. Jones Jr. (D)
▌9. Laurie C. Battle (D)

==== Arizona ====
▌1. John Jacob Rhodes (R)
▌2. Harold Patten (D)

==== Arkansas ====
▌1. Ezekiel C. Gathings (D)
▌2. Wilbur Mills (D)
▌3. James William Trimble (D)
▌4. Oren Harris (D)
▌5. Brooks Hays (D)
▌6. William F. Norrell (D)

==== California ====
▌1. Hubert B. Scudder (R)
▌2. Clair Engle (D)
▌3. John E. Moss (D)
▌4. William S. Mailliard (R)
▌5. John F. Shelley (D)
▌6. Robert Condon (D)
▌7. John J. Allen Jr. (R)
▌8. George P. Miller (D)
▌9. J. Arthur Younger (R)
▌10. Charles Gubser (R)
▌11. J. Leroy Johnson (R)
▌12. Allan O. Hunter (R)
▌13. Ernest K. Bramblett (R)
▌14. Harlan Hagen (D)
▌15. Gordon L. McDonough (R)
▌16. Donald L. Jackson (R)
▌17. Cecil R. King (D)
▌18. Craig Hosmer (R)
▌19. Chester E. Holifield (D)
▌20. John Carl Hinshaw (R)
▌21. Edgar W. Hiestand (R)
▌22. Joseph F. Holt (R)
▌23. Clyde Doyle (D)
▌24. Norris Poulson (R), until June 11, 1953

▌Glenard P. Lipscomb (R), from November 10, 1953

▌25. Patrick J. Hillings (R)
▌26. Sam Yorty (D)
▌27. Harry R. Sheppard (D)
▌28. James B. Utt (R)
▌29. John R. Phillips (R)
▌30. Bob Wilson (R)

==== Colorado ====
▌1. Byron G. Rogers (D)
▌2. William S. Hill (R)
▌3. John Chenoweth (R)
▌4. Wayne N. Aspinall (D)

==== Connecticut ====
▌1. Thomas J. Dodd (D)
▌2. Horace Seely-Brown Jr. (R)
▌3. Albert W. Cretella (R)
▌4. Albert P. Morano (R)
▌5. James T. Patterson (R)
▌At-large. Antoni Sadlak (R)

==== Delaware ====
▌At-large. Herbert Warburton (R)

==== Florida ====
▌1. Courtney W. Campbell (D)
▌2. Charles E. Bennett (D)
▌3. Robert L. F. Sikes (D)
▌4. Bill Lantaff (D)
▌5. Syd Herlong (D)
▌6. Dwight L. Rogers (D), until December 1, 1954
▌7. James A. Haley (D)
▌8. Donald Ray Matthews (D)

==== Georgia ====
▌1. Prince Preston (D)
▌2. J. L. Pilcher (D), from February 4, 1953
▌3. Tic Forrester (D)
▌4. Albert Sidney Camp (D), until July 24, 1954

▌John Flynt (D), from November 2, 1954

▌5. James C. Davis (D)
▌6. Carl Vinson (D)
▌7. Henderson Lovelace Lanham (D)
▌8. William McDonald Wheeler (D)
▌9. Phil Landrum (D)
▌10. Paul Brown (D)

==== Idaho ====
▌1. Gracie Pfost (D)
▌2. Hamer H. Budge (R)

==== Illinois ====
▌1. William L. Dawson (D)
▌2. Barratt O'Hara (D)
▌3. Fred E. Busbey (R)
▌4. William E. McVey (R)
▌5. John C. Kluczynski (D)
▌6. Thomas J. O'Brien (D)
▌7. James Bowler (D), from July 7, 1953
▌8. Thomas S. Gordon (D)
▌9. Sidney R. Yates (D)
▌10. Richard W. Hoffman (R)
▌11. Timothy P. Sheehan (R)
▌12. Edgar A. Jonas (R)
▌13. Marguerite S. Church (R)
▌14. Chauncey W. Reed (R)
▌15. Noah M. Mason (R)
▌16. Leo E. Allen (R)
▌17. Leslie C. Arends (R)
▌18. Harold H. Velde (R)
▌19. Robert B. Chiperfield (R)
▌20. Sid Simpson (R)
▌21. Peter F. Mack Jr. (D)
▌22. William L. Springer (R)
▌23. Charles W. Vursell (R)
▌24. Melvin Price (D)
▌25. C. W. Bishop (R)

==== Indiana ====
▌1. Ray Madden (D)
▌2. Charles A. Halleck (R)
▌3. Shepard J. Crumpacker Jr. (R)
▌4. E. Ross Adair (R)
▌5. John V. Beamer (R)
▌6. Cecil M. Harden (R)
▌7. William G. Bray (R)
▌8. D. Bailey Merrill (R)
▌9. Earl Wilson (R)
▌10. Ralph Harvey (R)
▌11. Charles B. Brownson (R)

==== Iowa ====
▌1. Thomas E. Martin (R)
▌2. Henry O. Talle (R)
▌3. H. R. Gross (R)
▌4. Karl M. LeCompte (R)
▌5. Paul H. Cunningham (R)
▌6. James I. Dolliver (R)
▌7. Ben F. Jensen (R)
▌8. Charles B. Hoeven (R)

==== Kansas ====
▌1. Howard Shultz Miller (D)
▌2. Errett P. Scrivner (R)
▌3. Myron V. George (R)
▌4. Edward Herbert Rees (R)
▌5. Clifford R. Hope (R)
▌6. Wint Smith (R)

==== Kentucky ====
▌1. Noble J. Gregory (D)
▌2. Garrett Withers (D), until April 30, 1953

▌William Natcher (D), from August 1, 1953

▌3. John M. Robsion Jr. (R)
▌4. Frank Chelf (D)
▌5. Brent Spence (D)
▌6. John C. Watts (D)
▌7. Carl D. Perkins (D)
▌8. James S. Golden (R)

==== Louisiana ====
▌1. F. Edward Hébert (D)
▌2. Hale Boggs (D)
▌3. Edwin E. Willis (D)
▌4. Overton Brooks (D)
▌5. Otto Passman (D)
▌6. James H. Morrison (D)
▌7. T. Ashton Thompson (D)
▌8. George S. Long (D)

==== Maine ====
▌1. Robert Hale (R)
▌2. Charles P. Nelson (R)
▌3. Clifford McIntire (R)

==== Maryland ====
▌1. Edward Tylor Miller (R)
▌2. James Devereux (R)
▌3. Edward Garmatz (D)
▌4. George Hyde Fallon (D)
▌5. Frank Small Jr. (R)
▌6. DeWitt Hyde (R)
▌7. Samuel Friedel (D)

==== Massachusetts ====
▌1. John W. Heselton (R)
▌2. Edward Boland (D)
▌3. Philip J. Philbin (D)
▌4. Harold Donohue (D)
▌5. Edith Nourse Rogers (R)
▌6. William H. Bates (R)
▌7. Thomas J. Lane (D)
▌8. Angier Goodwin (R)
▌9. Donald W. Nicholson (R)
▌10. Laurence Curtis (R)
▌11. Tip O'Neill (D)
▌12. John W. McCormack (D)
▌13. Richard B. Wigglesworth (R)
▌14. Joseph W. Martin Jr. (R)

==== Michigan ====
▌1. Thaddeus M. Machrowicz (D)
▌2. George Meader (R)
▌3. Paul W. Shafer (R), until August 17, 1954
▌4. Clare E. Hoffman (R)
▌5. Gerald Ford (R)
▌6. Kit Clardy (R)
▌7. Jesse P. Wolcott (R)
▌8. Alvin Morell Bentley (R)
▌9. Ruth Thompson (R)
▌10. Elford Albin Cederberg (R)
▌11. Victor A. Knox (R)
▌12. John B. Bennett (R)
▌13. George D. O'Brien (D)
▌14. Louis C. Rabaut (D)
▌15. John D. Dingell Sr. (D)
▌16. John Lesinski Jr. (D)
▌17. Charles G. Oakman (R)
▌18. George A. Dondero (R)

==== Minnesota ====
▌1. August H. Andresen (R)
▌2. Joseph P. O'Hara (R)
▌3. Roy Wier (DFL)
▌4. Eugene McCarthy (DFL)
▌5. Walter Judd (R)
▌6. Fred Marshall (DFL)
▌7. Herman Carl Andersen (R)
▌8. John Blatnik (DFL)
▌9. Harold Hagen (R)

==== Mississippi ====
▌1. Thomas Abernethy (D)
▌2. Jamie L. Whitten (D)
▌3. Frank Ellis Smith (D)
▌4. John Bell Williams (D)
▌5. W. Arthur Winstead (D)
▌6. William M. Colmer (D)

==== Missouri ====
▌1. Frank M. Karsten (D)
▌2. Thomas B. Curtis (R)
▌3. Leonor Sullivan (D)
▌4. Jeffrey Paul Hillelson (R)
▌5. Richard Walker Bolling (D)
▌6. William Clay Cole (R)
▌7. Dewey Short (R)
▌8. A. S. J. Carnahan (D)
▌9. Clarence Cannon (D)
▌10. Paul C. Jones (D)
▌11. Morgan M. Moulder (D)

==== Montana ====
▌1. Lee Metcalf (D)
▌2. Wesley A. D'Ewart (R)

==== Nebraska ====
▌1. Carl Curtis (R), until December 31, 1954
▌2. Roman Hruska (R), until November 8, 1954
▌3. Robert Dinsmore Harrison (R)
▌4. Arthur L. Miller (R)

==== Nevada ====
▌At-large. Clarence Clifton Young (R)

==== New Hampshire ====
▌1. Chester Earl Merrow (R)
▌2. Norris Cotton (R), until November 7, 1954

==== New Jersey ====
▌1. Charles A. Wolverton (R)
▌2. T. Millet Hand (R)
▌3. James C. Auchincloss (R)
▌4. Charles R. Howell (D)
▌5. Peter Frelinghuysen Jr. (R)
▌6. Clifford P. Case (R), until August 16, 1953

▌Harrison A. Williams (D), from November 3, 1953

▌7. William B. Widnall (R)
▌8. Gordon Canfield (R)
▌9. Frank C. Osmers Jr. (R)
▌10. Peter W. Rodino (D)
▌11. Hugh Joseph Addonizio (D)
▌12. Robert Kean (R)
▌13. Alfred Dennis Sieminski (D)
▌14. Edward J. Hart (D)

==== New Mexico ====
▌At-large. John J. Dempsey (D)
▌At-large. Antonio M. Fernández (D)

==== New York ====
▌1. Stuyvesant Wainwright (R)
▌2. Steven Derounian (R)
▌3. Frank J. Becker (R)
▌4. Henry J. Latham (R)
▌5. Albert H. Bosch (R)
▌6. Lester Holtzman (D)
▌7. James J. Delaney (D)
▌8. Louis B. Heller (D), until July 21, 1954
▌9. Eugene J. Keogh (D)
▌10. Edna F. Kelly (D)
▌11. Emanuel Celler (D)
▌12. Francis E. Dorn (R)
▌13. Abraham J. Multer (D)
▌14. John J. Rooney (D)
▌15. John H. Ray (R)
▌16. Adam Clayton Powell Jr. (D)
▌17. Frederic René Coudert Jr. (R)
▌18. James G. Donovan (D)
▌19. Arthur George Klein (D)
▌20. Franklin Delano Roosevelt Jr. (D)
▌21. Jacob Javits (R), until December 31, 1954
▌22. Sidney A. Fine (D)
▌23. Isidore Dollinger (D)
▌24. Charles A. Buckley (D)
▌25. Paul A. Fino (R)
▌26. Ralph A. Gamble (R)
▌27. Ralph W. Gwinn (R)
▌28. Katharine St. George (R)
▌29. J. Ernest Wharton (R)
▌30. Leo W. O'Brien (D)
▌31. Dean P. Taylor (R)
▌32. Bernard W. Kearney (R)
▌33. Clarence E. Kilburn (R)
▌34. William R. Williams (R)
▌35. R. Walter Riehlman (R)
▌36. John Taber (R)
▌37. W. Sterling Cole (R)
▌38. Kenneth Keating (R)
▌39. Harold C. Ostertag (R)
▌40. William E. Miller (R)
▌41. Edmund P. Radwan (R)
▌42. John R. Pillion (R)
▌43. Daniel A. Reed (R)

==== North Carolina ====
▌1. Herbert Covington Bonner (D)
▌2. Lawrence H. Fountain (D)
▌3. Graham A. Barden (D)
▌4. Harold D. Cooley (D)
▌5. Richard Thurmond Chatham (D)
▌6. Carl T. Durham (D)
▌7. Frank Ertel Carlyle (D)
▌8. Charles B. Deane (D)
▌9. Hugh Quincy Alexander (D)
▌10. Charles R. Jonas (R)
▌11. Woodrow W. Jones (D)
▌12. George A. Shuford (D)

==== North Dakota ====
▌At-large. Otto Krueger (R)
▌At-large. Usher L. Burdick (R-NPL)

==== Ohio ====
▌1. Gordon H. Scherer (R)
▌2. William E. Hess (R)
▌3. Paul F. Schenck (R)
▌4. William Moore McCulloch (R)
▌5. Cliff Clevenger (R)
▌6. James G. Polk (D)
▌7. Clarence J. Brown (R)
▌8. Jackson Edward Betts (R)
▌9. Frazier Reams (I)
▌10. Thomas A. Jenkins (R)
▌11. Oliver P. Bolton (R)
▌12. John M. Vorys (R)
▌13. Alvin F. Weichel (R)
▌14. William Hanes Ayres (R)
▌15. Robert T. Secrest (D), until September 26, 1954
▌16. Frank T. Bow (R)
▌17. J. Harry McGregor (R)
▌18. Wayne Hays (D)
▌19. Michael J. Kirwan (D)
▌20. Michael A. Feighan (D)
▌21. Robert Crosser (D)
▌22. Frances P. Bolton (R)
▌23. George H. Bender (R), until December 15, 1954

==== Oklahoma ====
▌1. Page Belcher (R)
▌2. Ed Edmondson (D)
▌3. Carl Albert (D)
▌4. Tom Steed (D)
▌5. John Jarman (D)
▌6. Victor Wickersham (D)

==== Oregon ====
▌1. A. Walter Norblad (R)
▌2. Sam Coon (R)
▌3. Homer D. Angell (R)
▌4. Harris Ellsworth (R)

==== Pennsylvania ====
▌1. William A. Barrett (D)
▌2. William T. Granahan (D)
▌3. James A. Byrne (D)
▌4. Earl Chudoff (D)
▌5. William J. Green Jr. (D)
▌6. Hugh Scott (R)
▌7. Benjamin F. James (R)
▌8. Karl C. King (R)
▌9. Paul B. Dague (R)
▌10. Joseph L. Carrigg (R)
▌11. Edward Bonin (R)
▌12. Ivor D. Fenton (R)
▌13. Samuel K. McConnell Jr. (R)
▌14. George M. Rhodes (D)
▌15. Francis E. Walter (D)
▌16. Walter M. Mumma (R)
▌17. Alvin Bush (R)
▌18. Richard M. Simpson (R)
▌19. S. Walter Stauffer (R)
▌20. James E. Van Zandt (R)
▌21. Augustine B. Kelley (D)
▌22. John P. Saylor (R)
▌23. Leon H. Gavin (R)
▌24. Carroll D. Kearns (R)
▌25. Louis E. Graham (R)
▌26. Thomas E. Morgan (D)
▌27. James G. Fulton (R)
▌28. Herman P. Eberharter (D)
▌29. Robert J. Corbett (R)
▌30. Vera Buchanan (D)

==== Rhode Island ====
▌1. Aime Forand (D)
▌2. John E. Fogarty (D)

==== South Carolina ====
▌1. L. Mendel Rivers (D)
▌2. John J. Riley (D)
▌3. William Jennings Bryan Dorn (D)
▌4. Joseph R. Bryson (D), until March 10, 1953

▌Robert T. Ashmore (D), from June 2, 1953

▌5. James P. Richards (D)
▌6. John L. McMillan (D)

==== South Dakota ====
▌1. Harold Lovre (R)
▌2. Ellis Yarnal Berry (R)

==== Tennessee ====
▌1. B. Carroll Reece (R)
▌2. Howard Baker Sr. (R)
▌3. James B. Frazier Jr. (D)
▌4. Joe L. Evins (D)
▌5. Percy Priest (D)
▌6. James Patrick Sutton (D)
▌7. Tom J. Murray (D)
▌8. Jere Cooper (D)
▌9. Clifford Davis (D)

==== Texas ====
▌1. Wright Patman (D)
▌2. Jack Brooks (D)
▌3. Brady P. Gentry (D)
▌4. Sam Rayburn (D)
▌5. Joseph Franklin Wilson (D)
▌6. Olin E. Teague (D)
▌7. John Dowdy (D)
▌8. Albert Thomas (D)
▌9. Clark W. Thompson (D)
▌10. Homer Thornberry (D)
▌11. William R. Poage (D)
▌12. Wingate H. Lucas (D)
▌13. Frank N. Ikard (D)
▌14. John E. Lyle Jr. (D)
▌15. Lloyd Bentsen (D)
▌16. Kenneth M. Regan (D)
▌17. Omar Burleson (D)
▌18. Walter E. Rogers (D)
▌19. George H. Mahon (D)
▌20. Paul J. Kilday (D)
▌21. O. C. Fisher (D)
▌At-large. Martin Dies Jr. (D)

==== Utah ====
▌1. Douglas R. Stringfellow (R)
▌2. William A. Dawson (R)

==== Vermont ====
▌At-large. Winston L. Prouty (R)

==== Virginia ====
▌1. Edward J. Robeson Jr. (D)
▌2. Porter Hardy Jr. (D)
▌3. J. Vaughan Gary (D)
▌4. Watkins Moorman Abbitt (D)
▌5. Thomas B. Stanley (D), until February 3, 1953

▌William M. Tuck (D), from April 14, 1953

▌6. Richard Harding Poff (R)
▌7. Burr Harrison (D)
▌8. Howard W. Smith (D)
▌9. William C. Wampler (R)
▌10. Joel Broyhill (R)

==== Washington ====
▌1. Thomas Pelly (R)
▌2. Jack Westland (R)
▌3. Russell V. Mack (R)
▌4. Hal Holmes (R)
▌5. Walt Horan (R)
▌6. Thor C. Tollefson (R)
▌At-large. Donald H. Magnuson (D)

==== West Virginia ====
▌1. Bob Mollohan (D)
▌2. Harley Orrin Staggers (D)
▌3. Cleveland M. Bailey (D)
▌4. Will E. Neal (R)
▌5. Elizabeth Kee (D)
▌6. Robert Byrd (D)

==== Wisconsin ====
▌1. Lawrence H. Smith (R)
▌2. Glenn Robert Davis (R)
▌3. Gardner R. Withrow (R)
▌4. Clement J. Zablocki (D)
▌5. Charles J. Kersten (R)
▌6. William Van Pelt (R)
▌7. Melvin Laird (R)
▌8. John W. Byrnes (R)
▌9. Merlin Hull (R), until May 17, 1953

▌Lester Johnson (D), from October 13, 1953

▌10. Alvin O'Konski (R)

==== Wyoming ====
▌At-large. William Henry Harrison III (R)

==== Non-voting members ====
▌Alaska Territory. Bob Bartlett (D)
▌Hawaii Territory. Joseph Rider Farrington (R), until June 19, 1954

▌Mary Elizabeth Pruett Farrington (R), from July 31, 1954

▌Puerto Rico. Antonio Fernós-Isern (PPD)

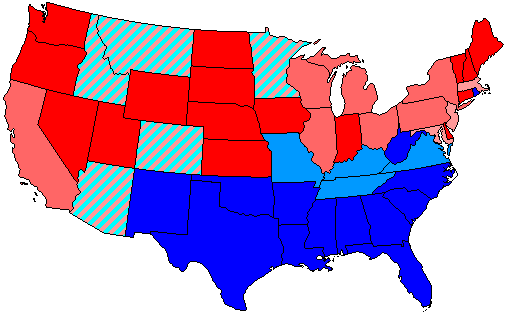
House seats by party holding plurality in state: 80+% Democratic / 80+% Republican; 60+% to 80% Democratic / 60+% to 80% Republican; Up to 60% Democratic / Up to 60% Republican

== Changes in membership ==
The count below reflects changes from the beginning of this Congress.

=== Senate ===
Senate changes
State (class)	Vacated by	Reason for change	Successor	Date of successor's formal installation (Note: When seated or oath administered, not necessarily when service began.)
North Carolina (2)	Willis Smith (D)	Died June 26, 1953. Successor appointed July 10, 1953.	Alton Lennon (D)	July 10, 1953
New Hampshire (3)	Charles W. Tobey (R)	Died July 24, 1953. Successor appointed August 14, 1953.	Robert W. Upton (R)	August 14, 1953
Ohio (3)	Robert A. Taft (R)	Died July 31, 1953. Successor appointed November 10, 1953.	Thomas A. Burke (D)	November 10, 1953
Nebraska (2)	Dwight Griswold (R)	Died April 12, 1954. Successor appointed April 16, 1954.	Eva Bowring (R)	April 16, 1954
North Carolina (3)	Clyde R. Hoey (D)	Died May 12, 1954. Successor appointed May 12, 1954 and then elected November 2, 1954.	Sam Ervin (D)	June 5, 1954
Wyoming (2)	Lester C. Hunt (D)	Died June 19, 1954. Successor appointed June 24, 1954.	Edward D. Crippa (R)	June 24, 1954
Nebraska (1)	Hugh A. Butler (R)	Died July 1, 1954. Successor appointed July 3, 1954.	Samuel W. Reynolds (R)	July 3, 1954
South Carolina (2)	Burnet R. Maybank (D)	Died September 1, 1954. Successor appointed September 6, 1954.	Charles E. Daniel (D)	September 6, 1954
Nevada (3)	Pat McCarran (D)	Died September 28, 1954. Successor appointed October 1, 1954.	Ernest S. Brown (R)	October 1, 1954
Nebraska (1)	Samuel W. Reynolds (R)	Did not run in the special election to fill seat. Successor elected November 2, 1954.	Roman Hruska (R)	November 8, 1954
Nebraska (2)	Eva Bowring (R)	Did not run in the special election to fill seat. Successor elected November 2, 1954.	Hazel Abel (R)	November 8, 1954
New Hampshire (3)	Robert W. Upton (R)	Lost special election to fill seat. Successor elected November 2, 1954.	Norris Cotton (R)	November 8, 1954
North Carolina (2)	Alton Lennon (D)	Lost special election to fill seat. Successor elected November 2, 1954.	W. Kerr Scott (D)	November 29, 1954
Wyoming (2)	Edward D. Crippa (R)	Did not run in the special election to fill seat. Successor elected November 2, 1954.	Joseph C. O'Mahoney (D)	November 29, 1954
Nevada (3)	Ernest S. Brown (R)	Lost special election to fill seat. Successor elected November 2, 1954.	Alan Bible (D)	December 2, 1954
Ohio (3)	Thomas A. Burke (D)	Lost special election to fill seat. Successor elected November 2, 1954.	George H. Bender (R)	December 16, 1954
South Carolina (2)	Charles E. Daniel (D)	Resigned December 23, 1954. Successor appointed December 24, 1954.	Strom Thurmond (D)	December 24, 1954
Nebraska (2)	Hazel Abel (R)	Resigned December 31, 1954. Successor was appointed January 1, 1955.	Carl Curtis (R)	January 1, 1955

=== House of Representatives ===
House changes
District	Vacated by	Reason for change	Successor	Date of successor's formal installation
Georgia 2nd	Vacant	Rep. E. Eugene Cox died during previous congress	J. L. Pilcher (D)	February 4, 1953
Illinois 7th	Vacant	Rep. Adolph J. Sabath died during previous congress	James Bowler (D)	July 7, 1953
Virginia 5th	Thomas B. Stanley (D)	Resigned February 3, 1953, to run for Governor of Virginia	William M. Tuck (D)	April 14, 1953
South Carolina 4th	Joseph R. Bryson (D)	Died March 10, 1953	Robert T. Ashmore (D)	June 2, 1953
Kentucky 2nd	Garrett Withers (D)	Died April 30, 1953	William Natcher (D)	August 1, 1953
Wisconsin 9th	Merlin Hull (R)	Died May 17, 1953	Lester Johnson (D)	October 13, 1953
California 24th	Norris Poulson (R)	Resigned June 11, 1953, after being elected Mayor of Los Angeles	Glenard P. Lipscomb (R)	November 10, 1953
New Jersey 6th	Clifford P. Case (R)	Resigned August 16, 1953	Harrison A. Williams (D)	November 3, 1953
Hawaii Territory at-large	Joseph Rider Farrington (R)	Died June 19, 1954	Mary Elizabeth Pruett Farrington (R)	August 4, 1954
New York 8th	Louis B. Heller (D)	Resigned July 21, 1954, after being appointed judge of the Court of Special Sessions of New York City	Vacant	Not filled this term
Georgia 4th	Albert Sidney Camp (D)	Died July 24, 1954	John Flynt (D)	November 2, 1954
Michigan 3rd	Paul W. Shafer (R)	Died August 17, 1954	Vacant	Not filled this term
Ohio 15th	Robert T. Secrest (D)	Resigned September 26, 1954	Vacant	Not filled this term
New Hampshire 2nd	Norris Cotton (R)	Resigned November 7, 1954, after being elected to the U.S. Senate	Vacant	Not filled this term
Nebraska 2nd	Roman Hruska (R)	Resigned November 8, 1954, after being elected to the U.S. Senate	Vacant	Not filled this term
Florida 6th	Dwight L. Rogers (D)	Died December 1, 1954	Vacant	Not filled this term
Ohio 23rd	George H. Bender (R)	Resigned December 15, 1954, after being elected to the U.S. Senate	Vacant	Not filled this term
Nebraska 1st	Carl Curtis (R)	Resigned December 31, 1954, after being elected to the U.S. Senate	Vacant	Not filled this term
New York 21st	Jacob Javits (R)	Resigned December 31, 1954, after being elected New York attorney General	Vacant	Not filled this term

== Committees ==
Lists of committees and their party leaders for members of the House and Senate committees can be found through the Official Congressional Directory at the bottom of this article. The directory after the pages of terms of service lists committees of the Senate, House (Standing with Subcommittees, Select and Special) and Joint and, after that, House/Senate committee assignments. On the committees section of the House and Senate in the Official Congressional Directory, the committee's members on the first row on the left side shows the chairman of the committee and on the right side shows the ranking member of the committee.

=== Senate ===
- Agriculture and Forestry (Chairman: George D. Aiken; Ranking Member: Allen J. Ellender)
- Appropriations (Chairman: Styles Bridges; Ranking Member: Carl Hayden)
- Armed Services (Chairman: Leverett Saltonstall; Ranking Member: Richard B. Russell)
- Banking and Currency (Chairman: Homer E. Capehart; Ranking Member: Burnet R. Maybank)
- Censure Charges against Senator McCarthy (Select) (Chairman: [data missing]; Ranking Member: [data missing])
- Compensation of Members of Congress (Select) (Chairman: [data missing]; Ranking Member: [data missing])
- District of Columbia (Chairman: Francis Case; Ranking Member: Matthew M. Neely)
- Finance (Chairman: Eugene D. Millikin; Ranking Member: Walter F. George)
- Foreign Relations (Chairman: Alexander Wiley; Ranking Member: Walter F. George)
- Government Operations (Chairman: Joseph R. McCarthy; Ranking Member: James E. Murray)
- Interior and Insular Affairs (Chairman: Hugh Butler; Ranking Member: John L. McClellan)
- Interstate and Foreign Commerce (Chairman: Charles W. Tobey; Ranking Member: Edwin C. Johnson)
- Judiciary (Chairman: William Langer; Ranking Member: Pat McCarran)
- Labor and Public Welfare (Chairman: H. Alexander Smith; Ranking Member: James E. Murray)
- Mail Cover on Senators (Special) (Chairman: [data missing]; Ranking Member: [data missing])
- Post Office and Civil Service (Chairman: Frank Carlson; Ranking Member: Olin D. Johnston)
- Public Works (Chairman: Edward Martin; Ranking Member: Dennis Chavez)
- Rules and Administration (Chairman: William E. Jenner; Ranking Member: Carl Hayden)
- Small Business (Select) (Chairman: Edward J. Thye)
- Whole

=== House of Representatives ===
- Agriculture (Chairman: Clifford R. Hope; Ranking Member: Carl Vinson)
- Appropriations (Chairman: John Taber; Ranking Member: Brent Spence)
- Armed Services (Chairman: Dewey Jackson Short; Ranking Member: John L. McMillan)
- Banking and Currency (Chairman: Jesse P. Wolcott; Ranking Member: Brent Spence)
- Communist Aggression (Select) (Chairman: Charles J. Kersten)
- Benefits for Dependents of Armed Services Veterans (Select) (Chairman: [data missing])
- Defense Production
- District of Columbia (Chairman: Sid Simpson; Ranking Member: John L. McMillan)
- Education and Labor (Chairman: Samuel K. McConnell Jr.; Ranking Member: Graham A. Barden)
- Foreign Affairs (Chairman: Robert B. Chiperfield; Ranking Member: James P. Richards)
- House Administration (Chairman: Karl M. LeCompte; Ranking Member: Omar Burleson)
- Investigate the Incorporation of the Baltic States into the U.S.S.R. (Select) (Chairman: Charles J. Kersten; Ranking Member: [data missing])
- Interior and Insular Affairs (Chairman: Arthur L. Miller; Ranking Member: Clair Engle)
- Interstate and Foreign Commerce (Chairman: Charles A. Wolverton; Ranking Member: Robert Crosser)
- Government Operations (Chairman: Clare E. Hoffman; Ranking Member: William L. Dawson)
- Judiciary (Chairman: Chauncey W. Reed; Ranking Member: Emanuel Celler)
- Merchant Marine and Fisheries (Chairman: Alvin F. Weichel; Ranking Member: Edward J. Hart)
- Post Office and Civil Service (Chairman: Edward H. Rees; Ranking Member: Tom J. Murray)
- Public Works (Chairman: George Anthony Dondero; Ranking Member: Charles A. Buckley)
- Rules (Chairman: Leo E. Allen; Ranking Member: Howard W. Smith)
- Small Business (Select) (Chairman: William S. Hill)
- Standards of Official Conduct
- Survival Benefits (Select) (Chairman: N/A; Ranking Member: N/A)
- Un-American Activities (Chairman: Harold H. Velde; Ranking Member: Francis E. Walter)
- Veterans' Affairs (Chairman: Edith Nourse Rogers; Ranking Member: Olin E. Teague)
- Ways and Means (Chairman: Daniel A. Reed; Ranking Member: Jere Cooper)
- Whole

=== Joint committees ===
- Atomic Energy
- Conditions of Indian Tribes (Special)
- Disposition of Executive Papers
- Economic (Chairman: Rep. Jesse P. Wolcott; Vice Chairman: Sen. Ralph Flanders)
- Immigration and Nationality Policy (Chairman: Sen. Arthur V. Watkins; Vice Chairman: Rep. Louis E. Graham)
- Legislative Budget
- The Library
- Navajo-Hopi Indian Administration
- Printing (Chairman: Sen. William E. Jenner; Vice Chairman: Rep. Karl M. LeCompte)
- Railroad Retirement Legislation
- Reduction of Nonessential Federal Expenditures (Chairman: Sen. Harry F. Byrd; Vice Chairman: Rep. Daniel A. Reed)
- Taxation (Chairman: Rep. Daniel A. Reed; Vice Chairman: Sen. Eugene D. Millikin)

== Employees ==
=== Legislative branch agency directors ===
- Architect of the Capitol: David Lynn (January 3, 1953 – September 30, 1954); J. George Stewart (September 30, 1954 – January 3, 1955)
- Attending Physician of the United States Congress: George Calver
- Comptroller General of the United States: Lindsay C. Warren, until April 30, 1954
  - Joseph Campbell, from December 14, 1954
- Librarian of Congress: Luther H. Evans, until 1953
  - Lawrence Quincy Mumford, from 1954
- Public Printer of the United States: John J. Deviny, until 1953
  - Raymond Blattenberger, from 1953

=== Senate ===
- Chaplain: Frederick Brown Harris (Methodist)
- Parliamentarian: Charles Watkins
- Secretary: J. Mark Trice
- Librarian: Sterling Dean, until 1954
  - Gus J. Miller (acting), from 1954
- Secretary for the Majority: William T. Reed
- Secretary for the Minority: Felton McLellan Johnston
- Sergeant at Arms: Forest A. Harness

=== House of Representatives ===
- Chaplain: Bernard Braskamp (Presbyterian)
- Clerk: Lyle O. Snader
- Doorkeeper: Tom Kennamer
- Parliamentarian: Lewis Deschler
- Postmaster: Beecher Hess
- Reading Clerks: George J. Maurer (D) and Alney E. Chaffee (R)
- Sergeant at Arms: William F. Russell, died July 7, 1953
  - Lyle O. Snader, July 8, 1953 – September 15, 1953
  - William R. Bonsell, starting September 15, 1953

== See also ==
- 1952 United States elections (elections leading to this Congress)
  - 1952 United States presidential election
  - 1952 United States Senate elections
  - 1952 United States House of Representatives elections
- 1954 United States elections (elections during this Congress, leading to the next Congress)
  - 1954 United States Senate elections
  - 1954 United States House of Representatives elections
