= 1952 United States House of Representatives elections in Nebraska =

- November 4, 1952

All 4 Nebraska seats to the United States House of Representatives
| | Majority party | Minority party |
|---|---|---|
| Party | Republican | Democratic |
| Last election | 4 | 0 |
| Seats won | 4 | 0 |
| Seat change | Steady | Steady |
| Popular vote | 385,932 | 179,849 |
| Percentage | 68.21% | 31.79% |

The 1952 United States House of Representatives elections in Nebraska were held on November 4, 1952, to elect the state of Nebraska's four members to the United States House of Representatives.

== Overview ==
1952 United States House of Representatives elections in Nebraska
| Party | Votes | Percentage | Seats | +/– |
|---|---|---|---|---|
| Republican | 385,932 | 68.21% | 4 | Steady |
| Democratic | 179,849 | 31.79% | 0 | Steady |
| Totals | 565,781 | 100.00% | 4 | — |

== District 1 ==
Incumbent Republican Congressman Carl Curtis ran for re-election to an eighth term. He faced no opposition in the Republican primary, and was challenged by farmer Samuel Freeman, the Democratic nominee, in the general election. Curtis defeated Freeman in a landslide, receiving 72 percent of the vote to Freeman's 28 percent.

=== Republican primary ===
==== Candidates ====
- Carl Curtis, incumbent U.S. Representative

==== Results ====
Republican primary results
| Party | Candidate | Votes | % |
|---|---|---|---|
| Republican | Carl T. Curtis (inc.) | 59,053 | 99.98% |
| Republican | Write-ins | 11 | 0.02% |
| Total votes | | 59,064 | 100.00% |

=== Democratic primary ===
==== Candidates ====
- Samuel Freeman, farmer, 1950 Democratic candidate for Congress, 1938 Democratic candidate for Governor

==== Results ====
Democratic primary results
| Party | Candidate | Votes | % |
|---|---|---|---|
| Democratic | Samuel Freeman | 22,220 | 99.91% |
| Democratic | Write-ins | 21 | 0.09% |
| Total votes | | 22,241 | 100.00% |

=== General election ===
==== Candidates ====
- Carl Curtis (Republican)
- Samuel Freeman (Democratic)

==== Results ====
1952 Nebraska's 1st congressional district general election results
| Party | Candidate | Votes | % |
|---|---|---|---|
| Republican | Carl Curtis (inc.) | 117,336 | 72.05% |
| Democratic | Samuel Freeman | 45,523 | 27.95% |
| Total votes | | 162,859 | 100.00% |
| Republican hold | | | |

== District 2 ==
Incumbent Republican Congressman Howard Buffett declined to run for re-election to a second consecutive term (and fifth term overall). Douglas County Commissioner Roman Hruska defeated newspaper publisher George J. Thomas to win the Republican nomination, and faced Democratic nominee James Hart, an attorney, in the general election. Hruska defeated Hart, winning 56 percent of the vote to Hart's 44 percent.

=== Republican primary ===
==== Candidates ====
- Roman Hruska, Douglas County Commissioner
- George J. Thomas, newspaper publisher, perennial candidate

==== Results ====
Republican primary results
| Party | Candidate | Votes | % |
|---|---|---|---|
| Republican | Roman L. Hruska | 32,263 | 70.72% |
| Republican | George J. Thomas | 13,325 | 29.21% |
| Republican | Write-ins | 32 | 0.07% |
| Total votes | | 45,620 | 100.00% |

=== Democratic primary ===
==== Candidates ====
- James A. Hart, attorney, 1950 Democratic nominee for Congress from Iowa's 7th congressional district
- Paul Manhart, attorney

==== Results ====
Democratic primary results
| Party | Candidate | Votes | % |
|---|---|---|---|
| Democratic | James A. Hart | 24,613 | 73.47% |
| Democratic | Paul Manhart | 8,852 | 26.42% |
| Democratic | Write-ins | 38 | 0.11% |
| Total votes | | 33,503 | 100.00% |

=== General election ===
==== Candidates ====
- Roman Hruska (Republican)
- James A. Hart (Democratic)

==== Results ====
1952 Nebraska's 2nd congressional district general election results
| Party | Candidate | Votes | % |
|---|---|---|---|
| Republican | Roman Hruska | 81,185 | 56.12% |
| Democratic | James A. Hart | 63,485 | 43.88% |
| Write-ins | | 1 | 0.00% |
| Total votes | | 144,671 | 100.00% |
| Republican hold | | | |

== District 3 ==
Incumbent Republican Congressman R. D. Harrison, who was first elected in a 1951 special election following the death of Congressman Karl Stefan, ran for re-election to a full term. Harrison defeated attorney Lyle Gill in the Republican primary, and advanced to the general election, where he was opposed by attorney Alan Dusatko, the Democratic nominee. Harrison defeated Dusatko in a landslide, winning 72 percent of the vote to Dusatko's 28 percent.

=== Republican primary ===
==== Candidates ====
- R. D. Harrison, incumbent Congressman
- Lyle B. Gill, attorney

==== Results ====
Republican primary results
| Party | Candidate | Votes | % |
|---|---|---|---|
| Republican | R. D. Harrison (inc.) | 34,859 | 82.20% |
| Republican | Lyle B. Gill | 7,550 | 17.80% |
| Total votes | | 42,409 | 100.00% |

=== Democratic primary ===
==== Candidates ====
- Alan A. Dusatko, attorney

==== Results ====
Democratic primary results
| Party | Candidate | Votes | % |
|---|---|---|---|
| Democratic | Alan A. Dusatko | 14,518 | 99.97% |
| Democratic | Write-ins | 5 | 0.03% |
| Total votes | | 14,523 | 100.00% |

=== General election ===
==== Candidates ====
- R. D. Harrison (Republican)
- Alan A. Dusatko (Democratic)

==== Results ====
1952 Nebraska's 3rd congressional district general election results
| Party | Candidate | Votes | % |
|---|---|---|---|
| Republican | R. D. Harrison (inc.) | 89,379 | 71.74% |
| Democratic | Alan A. Dusatko | 35,213 | 28.26% |
| Total votes | | 124,592 | 100.00% |
| Republican hold | | | |

== District 4 ==
Incumbent Republican Congressman Arthur L. Miller ran for re-election for a sixth term. He won the Republican nomination unopposed and faced Atkinson Mayor Francis D. Lee, the Democratic nominee, in the general election. Miller defeated Lee by a wide margin, winning 73 percent of the vote to Lee's 27 percent.

=== Republican primary ===
==== Candidates ====
- Arthur L. Miller, incumbent U.S. Representative

==== Results ====
Republican primary results
| Party | Candidate | Votes | % |
|---|---|---|---|
| Republican | Arthur L. Miller (inc.) | 45,273 | 99.95% |
| Republican | Write-ins | 22 | 0.05% |
| Total votes | | 45,295 | 100.00% |

=== Democratic primary ===
==== Candidates ====
- Francis D. Lee, Mayor of Atkinson

==== Results ====
Democratic primary results
| Party | Candidate | Votes | % |
|---|---|---|---|
| Democratic | Francis D. Lee | 15,872 | 99.96% |
| Democratic | Write-ins | 6 | 0.04% |
| Total votes | | 15,878 | 100.00% |

=== General election ===
==== Candidates ====
- Arthur L. Miller (Republican)
- Francis D. Lee (Democratic)

==== Results ====
1952 Nebraska's 4th congressional district general election results
| Party | Candidate | Votes | % |
|---|---|---|---|
| Republican | Arthur L. Miller (inc.) | 98,032 | 73.34% |
| Democratic | Francis D. Lee | 35,628 | 26.66% |
| Write-ins | | 1 | 0.00% |
| Total votes | | 133,661 | 100.00% |
| Republican hold | | | |

== See also ==
- 1952 United States House of Representatives elections
