= Joseph Benesch =

American politician (1898–1986)

Member of the Nebraska Legislature from the 6th district
- In office January 7, 1947 – January 2, 1951
- Preceded by: Sam Klaver
- Succeeded by: Sam Klaver

Personal details
- Born: October 27, 1898 Octavia, Nebraska
- Died: April 30, 1986 (aged 87) Omaha, Nebraska
- Party: Democratic
- Spouse: Adaline M. Tichacek (m. 1927)
- Children: 1
- Education: University of Nebraska; University of Chicago; Creighton University School of Law
- Occupation: Attorney

Military service
- Allegiance: United States
- Branch/service: United States Navy
- Years of service: 1917–1919

Joseph V. Benesch (October 27, 1898 – April 30, 1986) was a Democratic politician from Nebraska who served as a member of the Nebraska Legislature from the 6th district from 1947 to 1951.

== Early life ==
Benesch was born in Octavia, Nebraska, in 1898. He attended the University of Nebraska and University of Chicago, and served in the United States Navy from 1917 to 1919 during World War I. Benesch graduated from the Creighton University School of Law and practiced law in Omaha.

== Nebraska Legislature ==
In 1946, Benesch ran for the state legislature from the 6th district, challenging incumbent State Senator Sam Klaver for re-election. Beyond Klaver, Benesch faced four opponents in the nonpartisan primary: barber H. A. Ramold, salesman Barney Guss, attorney Stanley Nestle, and George Burns. Benesch placed second in the primary, winning 23 percent of the vote to Klaver's 46 percent. They proceeded to the general election, which Benesch narrowly won, defeating Klaver, 51–49 percent.

Benesch ran for re-election in 1948, and was challenged by Klaver and liquor dealer Evert Steve Weyerman. Benesch narrowly placed second in the primary, winning 41 percent of the vote and receiving 10 fewer votes than Klaver. In the general election, Benesch again narrowly defeated Klaver, winning 51 percent of the vote.

In 1950, Benesch decided against seeking a third term, noting that "it will be necessary for me to devote my full time to my law practice."

== Post-legislative career ==
Benesch announced that he would run for the U.S. Senate in 1954. In the Democratic primary, he faced former Governor Keith Neville and attorney Edward Dosek, the 1944 and 1950 Democratic nominee for Lieutenant Governor. He ultimately lost to Neville by a wide margin, receiving 25 percent of the vote to Neville's 53 percent.

In 1956, Benesch ran for Congress from the 2nd congressional district. Benesch narrowly won the Democratic primary over news reporter Philip Allen and former State Representative Mabel Gillespie, winning 24.9 percent of the vote to Allen's 24.5 percent and Gillespie's 22.5 percent. In the general election, Benesch lost to former Omaha Mayor Glenn Cunningham, the Republican nominee, receiving 45 percent of the vote to Cunningham's 53 percent.

== Death ==
Benesch died on April 30, 1986.
