= 1960 United States Senate election in Nebraska =

- November 8, 1960
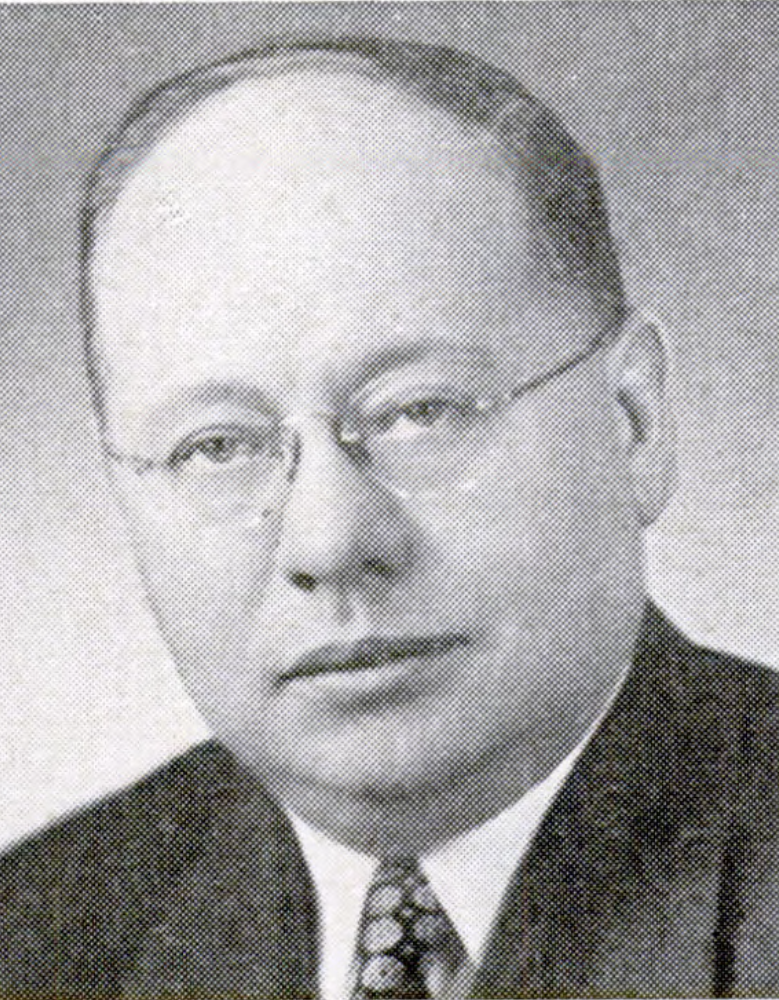

Nominee	Carl Curtis	Robert B. Conrad
Party	Republican	Democratic
Popular vote	352,748	245,807
Percentage	58.93%	41.07%
- County results Curtis: 50–60% 60–70% 70–80% Conrad: 50–60%
U.S. senator before election
Carl Curtis
Republican
Elected U.S. Senator
Carl Curtis
Republican

The 1960 United States Senate election in Nebraska took place on November 8, 1960. Incumbent Republican Senator Carl Curtis ran for re-election to a second term. He was initially set to face Governor Ralph Brooks, the Democratic nominee, but two months before the election, Brooks died and was replaced on the ballot by Robert B. Conrad, Brooks's administrative assistant. Curtis defeated Conrad in a landslide, but by a reduced margin from 1954, and slightly underperformed Republican presidential nominee Richard Nixon, who won Nebraska by 24% in the presidential election.

== Democratic primary ==
=== Candidates ===
- Ralph Brooks, Governor of Nebraska
- Clair A. Callan, businessman and former Chairman of Governor's Committee on Governmental Reorganization
- Albert J. Baker, warehouse superintendent
- Mike F. Kracher, Omaha businessman, 1958 Democratic candidate for the U.S. Senate

=== Results ===
Democratic primary results
Party	Candidate	Votes	%
Democratic	Ralph Brooks	41,777	42.34%
Democratic	Clair A. Callan	34,052	34.51%
Democratic	Albert J. Baker	14,355	14.55%
Democratic	Mike F. Kracher	8,424	8.54%
Democratic	Scattering	55	0.06%
Total votes		98,663	100.00%

=== Ballot replacement ===
The winner of the Democratic primary, Ralph Brooks, died on September 9, 1960. Brooks's health prompted rumors earlier in the year that he would withdraw from the Senate race, but he proceeded with his campaign. In late August, Brooks was hospitalized with congestive heart failure, but affirmed that he would continue the campaign. Brooks was ultimately replaced on the ballot by Robert B. Conrad, his administrative assistant as Governor.

== Republican primary ==
=== Candidates ===
- Carl Curtis, incumbent Senator

=== Results ===
Republican primary
Party	Candidate	Votes	%
Republican	Carl Curtis (inc.)	125,741	99.70%
Republican	Scattering	380	0.30%
Total votes		126,121	100.00%

== Results ==
1960 United States Senate election in Nebraska
Party	Candidate	Votes	%	±%
Republican	Carl Curtis (inc.)	352,748	58.91%	−2.16%
Democratic	Robert B. Conrad	245,837	41.06%	+2.13%
Write-in		158	0.03%	—
Majority		106,941	17.86%	−4.28%
Total votes		598,743	100.00%	
Republican hold				
