= Lawrence Brock =

American politician (1906–1968)

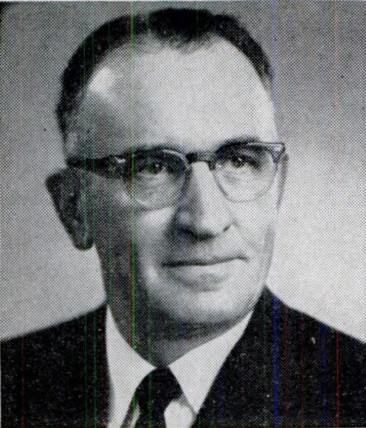
- Brock in 1959

Member of the U.S. House of Representatives from Nebraska's 3rd district
- In office January 3, 1959 – January 3, 1961
- Preceded by: R. D. Harrison
- Succeeded by: Ralph F. Beermann

Personal details
- Born: August 16, 1906 Columbus, Nebraska, US
- Died: August 28, 1968 (aged 62) Zion, Illinois, US
- Party: Democratic
- Occupation: Politician, farmer, pharmacist

Lawrence Brock (August 16, 1906 – August 28, 1968) was an American politician, farmer, and pharmacist. A Democrat, he was a member of the United States House of Representatives from Nebraska.

== Ealr life and education ==
Brock was born on August 16, 1906, near Columbus, Nebraska, the son of John Brock and Mary (née Moeller) Brock. Educated in Leigh, he graduated from the University of Nebraska College of Pharmacy in 1929.

== Career ==
Until 1931, Brock practiced medicine in Madison. He then moved to Wakefield, where he farmed cattle. He was president of the Cornbelt Livestock Feeders Association, the Nebraska Livestock Feeders Association, as well as vice-president of the Northeast Nebraska Rural Electric Association. He was a member of the Better Nebraska Association, the Nebraska Highway Advisory Commission, and the Wakefield School Board.

Brock was a Democrat. He was an alternate delegate to the 1952 and 1956 Democratic National Conventions. From 1954 to 1956, he was chairman of the Nebraska Democratic Party. He was an unsuccessful candidate in the 1956 United States House of Representatives election in Nebraksa, narrowly losing to R. D. Harrison.

Brock was a member of the United States House of Representatives, from January 3, 1959, to January 3, 1961, representing Nebraska's 3rd district. He lost the following election. He was the last Democrat to represent the district. Ideologically, he was conservative.

After serving in Congress, Brock was appointed assistant administrator of the Farmers Home Administration, which he served as until his death.

== Personal life and death ==
On June 26, 1929, Brock married Roenna Utemark, with whom he had four daughters. He was Lutheran. On January 30, 1967, he underwent surgery to remove a brain tumor. He died on August 28, 1968, aged 62, in Zion, Illinois, from illness, and was buried at Wakefield Cemetery. An archive of his papers is held by the Nebraska State Historical Society.

U.S. House of Representatives
Preceded by Robert Dinsmore Harrison	Member of the U.S. House of Representatives from Nebraska's 3rd congressional district 1959–1961	Succeeded by Ralph F. Beermann
