= 1954 United States Senate election in Nebraska =

1954 United States Senate election in Nebraska may refer to:

- 1954 United States Senate elections in Nebraska, the special election for the Class II U.S. Senate seat on the final months of Kenneth S. Wherry's term and the regularly scheduled November election for the next term
- 1954 United States Senate special election in Nebraska, the special election for the Class I U.S. Senate seat on the remaining four years of Hugh A. Butler's term, to January 1959
