= Ralph F. Beermann =

American politician (1912–1977)

Ralph Frederick Beermann
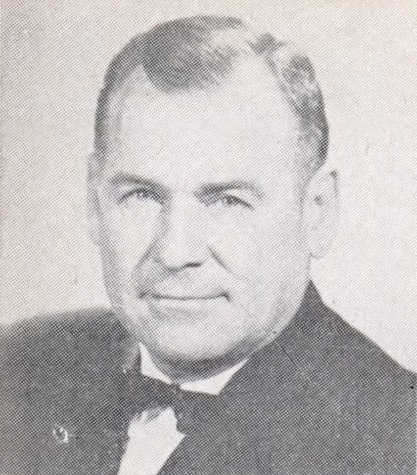
- From 1961's Pocket Congressional Directory of the Eighty-Seventh Congress

Member of the U.S. House of Representatives from Nebraska
- In office January 3, 1961 – January 3, 1965
- Preceded by: Lawrence Brock
- Succeeded by: Clair Armstrong Callan
- Constituency: 3rd district (1961-1963); 1st district (1963-1965)

Personal details
- Born: August 13, 1912 Dakota City, Nebraska
- Died: February 17, 1977 (aged 64) Sioux City, Iowa
- Spouse: Marjorie Beermann
- Education: Morningside College
- Profession: Farmer, Cattleman, Politician

Ralph Frederick Beermann (August 13, 1912 – February 17, 1977) was an American Republican politician and U.S. representative for Nebraska.

== Early life ==
Born near Dakota City, Nebraska, Beermann graduated from Morningside College in Sioux City, Iowa and then attended various army specialist schools.

== Career ==
During World War II, Beermann served in the African and European Theaters in the US Army as part of the 601st Ordnance Battalion and the 301st Ordnance Regiment. After the war, he partnered with his six brothers (the Beermann Brothers) in farming, alfalfa dehydrating and cattle raising in Dakota County, Nebraska.

Beermann served as chairman of the Dakota County Republican Central Committee for ten years and organized the Dakota County Young Republicans. He was elected to serve the 3rd district of Nebraska in the Eighty-seventh United States Congress from January 3, 1961 to January 3, 1963; and served the 1st district in the Eighty-eighth United States Congress from January 3, 1963 to January 3, 1965. He was narrowly defeated for re-election in 1964. After leaving Congress, Beermann returned to his business pursuits, but from 1972 to 1977, he served on the board of the Nebraska Public Power District.

== Death ==
Beermann died in a plane crash when the single-engine plane that he was piloting crashed at Sioux City Municipal Airport in Iowa on February 17, 1977; his age was 64 years and 188 days. He is interred at the Dakota City Cemetery.

He was a member of the Lutheran Church and a member of the Farm Bureau, American Legion, Veterans of Foreign Wars and the Kiwanis. Beermann was survived by his wife, Marjorie Beermann, and four brothers.

U.S. House of Representatives
Preceded by Lawrence Brock (D)	Member of the U.S. House of Representatives from Nebraska's 3rd congressional district January 3, 1961 – January 3, 1963	Succeeded by David T. Martin (R)
Preceded by Phillip Hart Weaver (R)	Member of the U.S. House of Representatives from Nebraska's 1st congressional district January 3, 1963 – January 3, 1965	Succeeded by Clair Armstrong Callan (D)
