= Karl Stefan =

American politician (1884–1951)

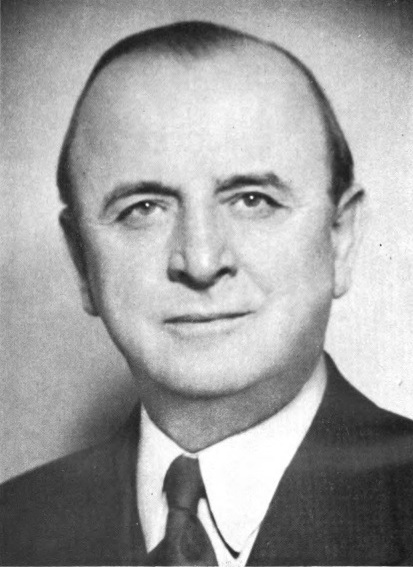
- Frontispiece of 1952's Karl Stefan, Late a Representative

Member of the U.S. House of Representatives from Nebraska's 3rd district
- In office January 3, 1935 – October 2, 1951
- Preceded by: Edgar Howard
- Succeeded by: Robert Dinsmore Harrison

Personal details
- Born: March 1, 1884 Žebrákov, Kingdom of Bohemia
- Died: October 2, 1951 (aged 67) Washington, D.C., United States
- Party: Republican

Karl Stefan (March 1, 1884 – October 2, 1951) was a Czech-American politician, newspaper editor, publisher, and radio commentator from Nebraska. A member of the Republican Party, he represented Nebraska's 3rd congressional district in the U.S. House of Representatives from 1935 to 1951.

== Early life ==
He was born on a farm in Žebrákov, Kingdom of Bohemia (now Czech Republic), on March 1, 1884. In 1885 he moved with his parents to Omaha, Nebraska. He was taught in the public schools and later a YMCA night school. He joined the United States National Guard, being first a private in the Illinois National Guard and then a lieutenant in the Nebraska National Guard. He was an inspector of telegraphs in the Philippine Constabulary from 1904 to 1906.

He moved to Norfolk, Nebraska, in 1909 to serve as a telegrapher. He became an editor of the Norfolk Daily News until 1924 and a radio commentator and contributor to newspapers and magazines until 1934. He was president of the Stefan Co. and publishers' agent for magazines and newspapers.

During his years as WJAG's first announcer, Stefan is credited with developing much of WJAG's programming, including a noontime show. Stefan, who announced WJAG's noon news report, opened his daily broadcast with a trademark greeting: "Hello friends. Hello everybody! You are listening to WJAG, the Norfolk Daily News station, and we're located at Norfolk, IN Nebraska. On the air with the regular noon-day program –– the lunch-hour session of WJAG's radio family." One of WJAG's first announcers, Art Breyer, who worked sans pay at the Norfolk station "for the fun of it," labeled Stefan the "backbone" of WJAG. Breyer said Stefan's "personality enabled him to become intimately acquainted with the listeners." In typical charismatic fashion, the local newscaster personalized a livestock quote on one of his noon reports. "Sam Kent," Stefan declared, "I've got good news for you today. Understand the price of hogs is 6½ cents today, and that's going to make everything all right." Stefan's radio persona, says Breyer, "endeared himself to the public." But Stefan had more than an appealing personality to draw listeners, he dispensed information. WJAG's first announcer not only peppered his noon broadcasts with local affairs but also news from the Norfolk Daily News' Associated Press (AP) newspaper wire.

Stefan was not only an announcer and newscaster but also the creator and producer of station programming. In 1922, he originated the "radio family," whose members gathered around a mythical dinner table each noon hour. Its aim, Stefan said, was "an unwritten understanding . . . that the station was to [be] run by its listeners –– the radio family." Mr. and Mrs. George Salter of Norfolk served as the first "father" and "mother." In fewer than two years, WJAG dispensed hundreds of "official" titles to its listeners: mail carrier, banker, chicken-eater, crippled girl (Marie Bentz), sweetheart, corn-king (Art Breyer), hog-man, shoe-man, Scotchman (Bill Graham, and later, Don Bridge of Norfolk), goat trainer, goat milker, wolfhound-man, and mayor (J. B. Hassman of Coleridge). In 1930, WJAG selected a new radio "father." L. B. Musselman, a Civil War veteran and Nebraska pioneer, succeeded the late G. B. Salter as head of the family table.

== United States House of Representatives ==
Stefan was elected to the U.S. Congress in 1934 and later became a member of congressional committee aiding inauguration of the Philippine Commonwealth Government in Manila in 1935. He was a delegate to the Interparliamentary Union in Oslo, Norway, in 1939. He was also an official adviser at the 1945 United Nations Conference in San Francisco, California.

He ran and won to represent Nebraska's 3rd district in 1935 and was reelected eight times. He died of acute cardiovascular collapse while in office on October 2, 1951, in Washington, D.C. He was buried in Prospect Hill Cemetery in Norfolk.

Norfolk's Karl Stefan Memorial Airport is named in his honor.

== See also ==
- List of members of the United States Congress who died in office (1950–1999)

U.S. House of Representatives
Preceded by Edgar Howard (D)	Member of the U.S. House of Representatives from Nebraska's 3rd congressional district January 3, 1935 – October 2, 1951	Succeeded by Robert Dinsmore Harrison (R)
