= 1954 United States Senate elections in Nebraska =

1954 United States Senate election in Nebraska
- November 2, 1954
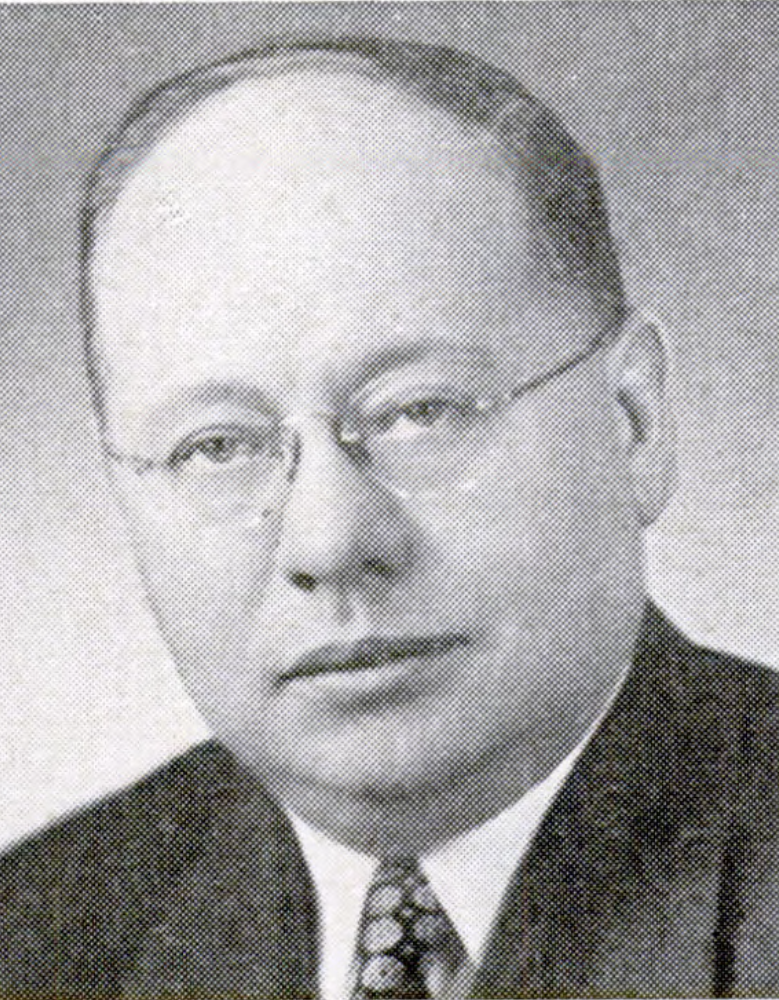

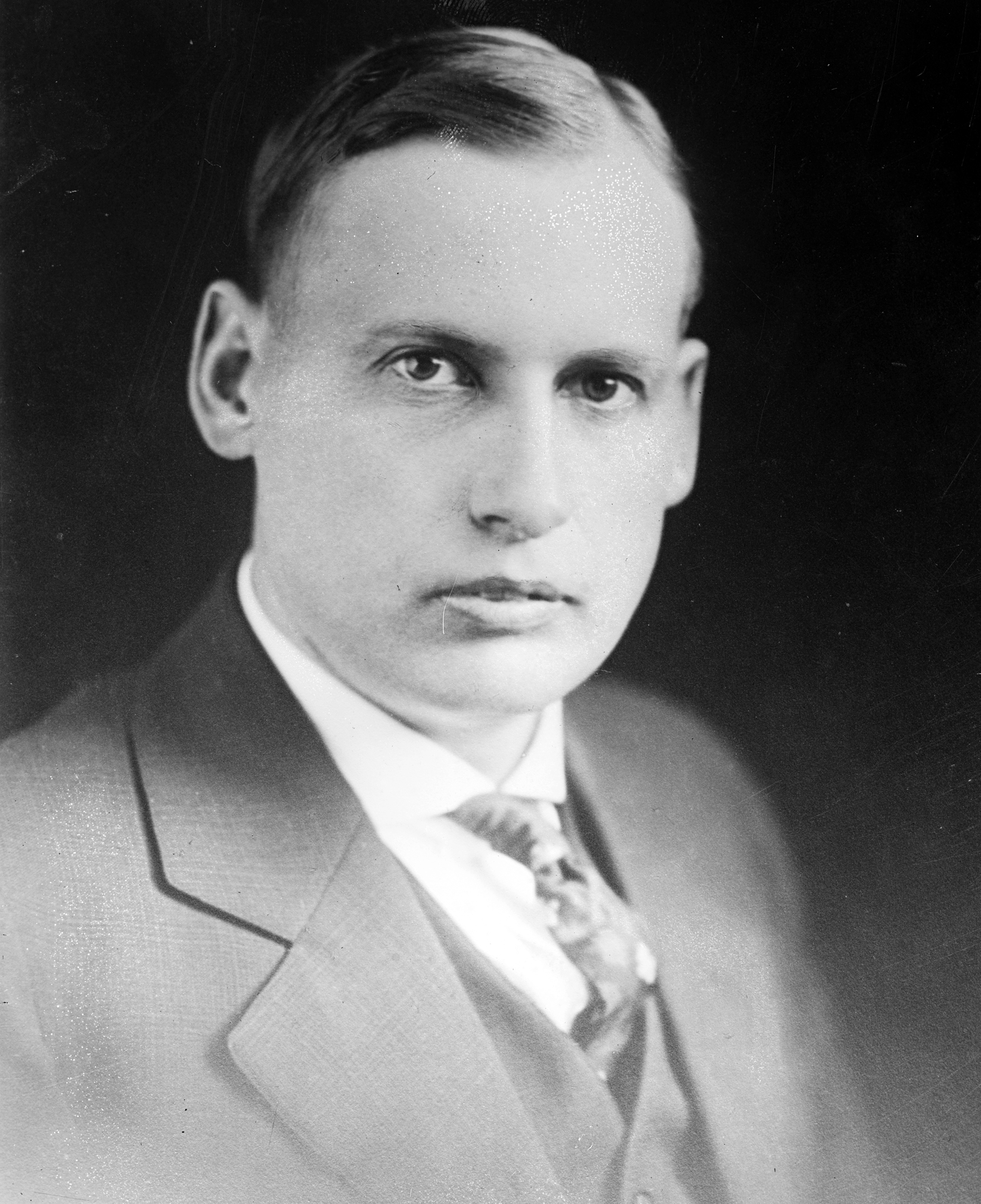
Nominee	Carl Curtis	Keith Neville
Party	Republican	Democratic
Popular vote	255,695	162,990
Percentage	61.07%	38.93%
- County results Curtis: 50–60% 60–70% 70–80% Neville: 50–60%
U.S. senator before election
Hazel Abel
Republican
Elected U.S. Senator
Carl Curtis
Republican

The 1954 United States Senate elections in Nebraska took place on November 2, 1954, for the Class II United States Senate seat. Incumbent Republican Senator Kenneth S. Wherry was elected to a second term in 1948, and died in office on November 29, 1951. Governor Val Peterson appointed Fred A. Seaton to hold the seat until the 1952 election. At the 1952 special election, former Governor Dwight Griswold was elected to serve out the remaining two years of Wherry's term. Griswold was a candidate for a full term, however, Griswold died suddenly on April 12, 1954, prompting another special election. Governor Robert B. Crosby appointed Eva Bowring to fill the seat until the November 2, 1954 special election.

At the same time as the special election, a regular election was held on the same day to elect a Senator to serve for the next six-year term. Bowring sought neither the final months of Wherry's term nor a full six-year term. In the special election, Hazel Abel, the vice-chairman of the State Republican Central Committee, won the Republican primary for the special election and defeated Democratic nominee William H. Meier. On the same day, Congressman Carl Curtis, a Republican, defeated former Governor Keith Neville, the Democratic nominee in the general election for the full six-year term.

Coincidentally, on the same day, another special election was held to fill the remaining four years of the term of the late Senator Hugh A. Butler, who was elected at the 1952 regular election and died on July 1, 1954.

== Democratic primary ==
=== Regular election ===
==== Candidates ====
- Joseph Benesch, former state senator
- Edward A. Dosek, Lincoln attorney, 1950 and 1944 Democratic nominee for lieutenant governor
- Keith Neville, former governor of Nebraska

==== Results ====
Democratic primary
Party	Candidate	Votes	%
Democratic	Keith Neville	38,114	52.83%
Democratic	Joseph V. Benesch	17,992	24.94%
Democratic	Edward A. Dosek	15,920	22.07%
Democratic	Scattering	116	0.16%
Total votes		72,142	100.00%

=== Special election ===
==== Candidates ====
- Mabel Gillespie, former state senator
- Charles R. Herrick, former state senator
- William H. Meier, chairman of the Nebraska Democratic Party

==== Results ====
Democratic primary
Party	Candidate	Votes	%
Democratic	William H. Meier	26,885	39.83%
Democratic	Mabel Gillespie	21,029	31.15%
Democratic	Charles R. Herrick	19,559	28.97%
Democratic	Scattering	33	0.05%
Total votes		67,506	100.00%

== Republican primary ==
=== Regular election ===
==== Candidates ====
- Terry Carpenter, state senator
- Robert B. Crosby, governor of Nebraska
- Carl Curtis, U.S. representative from Nebraska's 1st congressional district
- James L. Harrison, Air Force lieutenant colonel
- David Martin, former chairman of the Nebraska Republican Party
- Walter A. Nielsen, Omaha attorney, 1952 Republican candidate for the U.S. Senate
- John P. Overgaard, Lincoln real estate broker

==== Results ====
Republican primary
Party	Candidate	Votes	%
Republican	Carl Curtis	64,410	39.42%
Republican	Robert B. Crosby	43,580	26.67%
Republican	Terry Carpenter	30,767	18.83%
Republican	David Martin	18,283	11.19%
Republican	James L. Harrison	2,782	1.70%
Republican	Walter A. Nielsen	2,592	1.59%
Republican	John P. Overgaard	954	0.58%
Republican	Scattering	20	0.01%
Total votes		163,388	100.00%

=== Special election ===
==== Candidates ====
- Hazel Abel, vice chairman of the State Republican Central Committee
- Joseph Alexis, University of Nebraska–Lincoln modern languages professor
- N. W. Anderson, Lincoln insurance salesman
- Mac Baldrige, former U.S. representative from Nebraska's 2nd congressional district
- Chris C. Beck, Lincoln businessman
- Hugh Carson, state senator
- Richard R. Dempster, North Platte furniture store owner
- Max A. Denny, Fairbury attorney
- E. W. Gustafson, Scottsbluff accountant
- H. P. Heiliger, former state senator
- John R. Jirdon, Morrill businessman
- William Keeshan, former Boone County attorney
- Gerald Merritt, Lincoln building materials business owner
- John S. Samson, Omaha attorney
- Myles Standish, Omaha businessman
- S. E. Torgeson, Kimball attorney

==== Results ====
Republican primary
Party	Candidate	Votes	%
Republican	Hazel Abel	32,321	22.63%
Republican	Richard R. Dempster	13,895	9.73%
Republican	N. W. Anderson	12,862	9.01%
Republican	John R. Jirdon	11,396	7.98%
Republican	Hugh Carson	10,436	7.31%
Republican	Chris C. Beck	8,939	6.26%
Republican	S. E. Torgeson	8,826	6.18%
Republican	Max A. Denney	8,824	6.18%
Republican	Myles Standish	6,846	4.79%
Republican	E. W. Gustafson	6,696	4.69%
Republican	Mac Baldrige	5,937	4.16%
Republican	Joseph Alexis	4,461	3.12%
Republican	William Keeshan	3,193	2.24%
Republican	H. P. Heiliger	2,844	1.99%
Republican	Gerald Merritt	2,729	1.91%
Republican	John S. Samson	2,544	1.78%
Republican	Scattering	65	0.05%
Total votes		142,814	100.00%

== General election ==
=== Regular election ===
1954 United States Senate election in Nebraska
Party	Candidate	Votes	%	±%
Republican	Carl Curtis	255,695	61.07%	−2.50%
Democratic	Keith Neville	162,990	38.93%	+2.51%
Write-in		6	0.00%	—
Majority		92,705	22.14%	−5.01%
Total votes		418,691	100.00%	
Republican hold				

=== Special election ===
1954 United States Senate special election in Nebraska
Party	Candidate	Votes	%	±%
Republican	Hazel Abel	233,589	57.76%	−5.81%
Democratic	William H. Meier	170,828	42.24%	+5.82%
Write-in		5	0.00%	—
Majority		62,761	15.52%	−11.63%
Total votes		404,422	100.00%	
Republican hold				
