= 1950 Nebraska lieutenant gubernatorial election =

- November 7, 1950
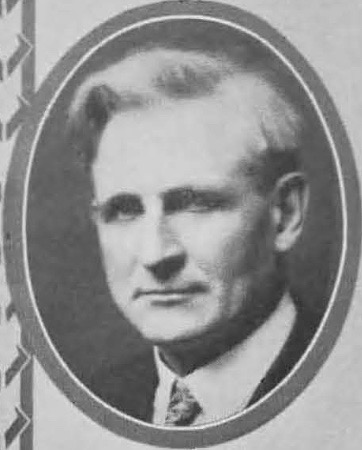

Nominee	Charles J. Warner	Edward A. Dosek
Party	Republican	Democratic
Popular vote	264,159	163,481
Percentage	61.8%	38.2%
Lieutenant Governor before election
Charles J. Warner
Republican
Elected Lieutenant Governor
Charles J. Warner
Republican

The 1950 Nebraska lieutenant gubernatorial election was held on November 7, 1950, and featured incumbent Nebraska Lieutenant Governor Charles J. Warner, a Republican, defeating Democratic nominee Edward A. Dosek, a businessman, to win his second term as lieutenant governor.

== Democratic primary ==
=== Candidates ===
- Tom Dooley, former member of the Nebraska Legislature from District 3 in Papillion, Nebraska
- Edward A. Dosek, businessman, banker, and insurance agent from Lincoln, Nebraska
- Woodrow Bryan Shurtleff, realtor from Lincoln, Nebraska
- C. S. Wortman, lawyer from Lincoln, Nebraska, and former legislator and judge from Oklahoma

=== Results ===
Democratic primary results
Party	Candidate	Votes	%
Democratic	Edward A. Dosek	35,392	99.91
Democratic	Tom Dooley	18,382	24.46
Democratic	Woodrow Bryan Shurtleff	12,435	16.55
Democratic	C. S. Wortman	8,936	11.89

== Republican primary ==
=== Candidates ===
- Andrew E. Swanson, farmer from near Polk, Nebraska, and unsuccessful primary candidate for lieutenant governor in 1944 and governor in 1946 and 1948. Swanson originally registered to run in the Republican primary for governor in 1950 but later withdrew with the hope of running in the Democratic primary for lieutenant governor, but due to a 60-day-waiting-period requirement to switch parties, Swanson registered to run in the Republican primary for lieutenant governor instead.
- Charles J. Warner, incumbent Nebraska Lieutenant Governor

=== Results ===
Republican primary results
Party	Candidate	Votes	%
Republican	Charles J. Warner (incumbent)	92,323	74.05
Republican	Andrew E. Swanson	32,351	25.95

== General election ==
=== Results ===
Nebraska lieutenant gubernatorial election, 1950
Party	Candidate	Votes	%
Republican	Charles J. Warner (incumbent)	264,159	61.77
Democratic	Edward A. Dosek	163,481	38.23
Total votes		427,640	100.00
Republican hold			

== See also ==
- 1950 Nebraska gubernatorial election
