= Glenn Cunningham (Nebraska politician) =

American politician

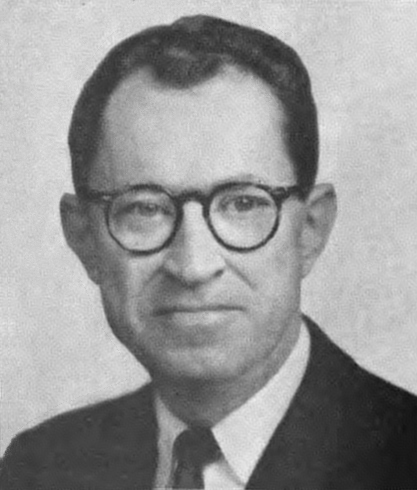

Member of the U.S. House of Representatives from Nebraska's 2nd district
- In office January 3, 1957 – January 3, 1971
- Preceded by: Jackson B. Chase
- Succeeded by: John Y. McCollister

Mayor of Omaha
- In office 1948–1954
- Preceded by: Charles W. Leeman
- Succeeded by: Johnny Rosenblatt

Personal details
- Born: Glenn Clarence Cunningham; September 10, 1912 Omaha, Nebraska, U.S.
- Died: December 18, 2003 (aged 91) Omaha, Nebraska, U.S.
- Party: Republican
- Education: University of Nebraska Omaha

Glenn Clarence Cunningham (September 10, 1912 – December 18, 2003) was an American Republican politician.

He was born in Omaha, Nebraska on September 10, 1912 and graduated from the University of Nebraska Omaha in 1935. He sold insurance for a while. From 1946 to 1948 he was a member of the Omaha board of education and a member of Omaha city council from 1947 to 1948. He was elected Mayor of Omaha from 1949 to 1954.

He was a delegate to the 1948 Republican National Convention and to the 1952 Republican National Convention. He was elected as a Republican to the Eighty-fifth United States Congress and to the six succeeding Congresses serving from January 3, 1957 to January 3, 1971. Cunningham voted in favor of the Civil Rights Acts of 1957, 1960, 1964, and 1968, and the Voting Rights Act of 1965, but did not vote on the 24th Amendment to the U.S. Constitution. In 1970, he was the sole member of the House of Representatives to vote against the Clean Air Act amendments, which passed 374–1. He lost his bid for renomination to the Ninety-second United States Congress in 1970 to then Douglas County Commissioner John Y. McCollister. He died on December 18, 2003, in Omaha. He was a member of the Episcopalian church and of Pi Kappa Alpha.

Glenn Cunningham Lake was named for Cunningham.

Political offices
Preceded by Charles W. Leeman	Mayor of Omaha; 1948-1954	Succeeded by Johnny Rosenblatt
U.S. House of Representatives
Preceded by Jackson B. Chase (R)	Member of the U.S. House of Representatives from Nebraska's 2nd congressional district January 3, 1957 – January 3, 1971	Succeeded by John Y. McCollister (R)
