= Jackson B. Chase =

American politician (1890–1974)

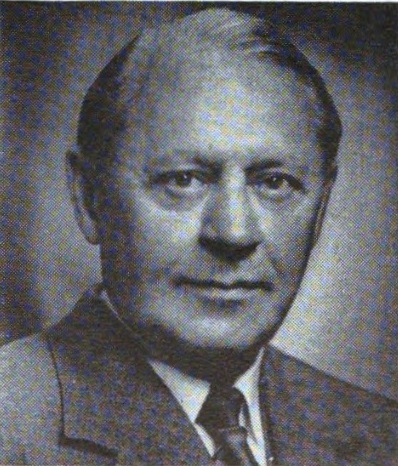
- From 1955's Pocket Congressional Directory of the Eighty-Fourth Congress

Member of the U.S. House of Representatives from Nebraska's 2nd district
- In office January 3, 1955 – January 3, 1957
- Preceded by: Roman Hruska
- Succeeded by: Glenn Cunningham

Personal details
- Born: August 19, 1890 Seward, Nebraska, U.S.
- Died: May 4, 1974 (aged 83) Atlanta, Georgia, U.S.
- Party: Republican
- Education: University of Nebraska; University of Michigan Law School

Jackson Burton Chase (August 19, 1890 – May 4, 1974) was an American Republican politician.

== Early life ==
He was born in Seward, Nebraska, on August 19, 1890, and lived in California and Illinois while working for Burlington Railroad. He graduated from high school in Omaha, Nebraska, in 1907 and was worked for John Deere Plow Co from 1907 to 1910. He got his Bachelor of Laws from the University of Nebraska in 1912, where he was a member of Chi Phi fraternity. He received his law degree from the University of Michigan Law School in 1913, passing the bar in the same year setting up practice in Chicago, Illinois

== Legal career and public service ==
During World War I he served with the Field Artillery in the United States Army. He was assistant attorney general of Nebraska in 1921 and 1922. He engaged in the practice of law in Omaha from 1923 to 1942. During his practice he was legal adviser to Omaha Welfare Board in 1930 and 1931. He was also elected a member of the Nebraska House of Representatives in 1933 and 1934. He owned and managed farmland in Nebraska and Iowa.

He served as a major in the Judge Advocate General's Department from 1942 to 1945. He was the chairman of the Nebraska Liquor Control Commission in 1945 and 1946. He was a Judge of the fourth judicial district court of Nebraska from 1946 to 1954.

== Congressional Service ==
He was elected as a Republican to the Eighty-fourth United States Congress serving from January 3, 1955, to January 3, 1957. He was not a candidate for renomination in 1956 to the Eighty-fifth United States Congress instead he was again elected judge of the fourth judicial district court of Nebraska 1956 to 1960. He died in Atlanta, Georgia, on May 4, 1974, and is buried in Omaha.

U.S. House of Representatives
Preceded by Roman L. Hruska (R)	Member of the U.S. House of Representatives from Nebraska's 2nd congressional district January 3, 1955 – January 3, 1957	Succeeded by Glenn Cunningham (R)
