= Phil Weaver =

American politician (1919–1989)

Phillip Hart Weaver
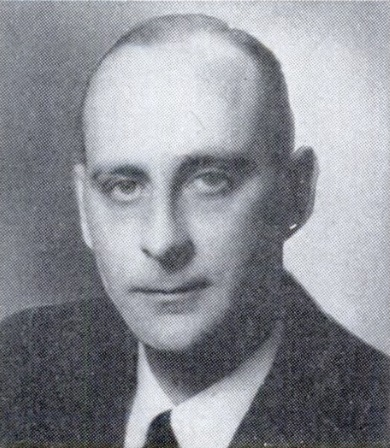
- From 1961's Pocket Congressional Directory of the Eighty-Seventh Congress

Member of the U.S. House of Representatives from Nebraska's 1st congressional district
- In office January 3, 1955 – January 3, 1963
- Preceded by: Carl Curtis
- Succeeded by: Ralph F. Beermann

Personal details
- Born: April 9, 1919 Falls City, Nebraska, U.S.
- Died: April 16, 1989 (aged 70) Falls City, Nebraska, U.S.
- Party: Republican

Phillip Hart Weaver (April 9, 1919 – April 16, 1989) was a Nebraska Republican politician, who was also the son of former Nebraska governor Arthur J. Weaver and grandson of former representative Archibald Jerard Weaver.

He was born in Falls City, Nebraska on April 9, 1919. He was educated at St. Benedicts College in Atchison, Kansas from 1938 to 1939 and graduated from the University of Nebraska. From 1938 to 1940 he was a radio announcer.

On June 1, 1942 he joined the Armed Services and assigned to command, staff, and liaison duties with the Seventeenth Airborne Division, First Allied Airborne Army, and Headquarters, Berlin District. He was discharged as a captain in March 1946 after having been awarded the Combat Infantryman Badge, Glider Wings, and the Bronze Star with oak leaf cluster. He retired as a lieutenant colonel in United States Army Reserves.

He returned to Falls City and became engaged in the insurance and finance business from 1946 to 1949 and was the director of the Falls City Wholesale & Supply, Inc. at the same time. In 1949 and 1950 he was the civilian administrative assistant to the G-1, Fifth Army, Chicago. He also established an automobile agency in Falls City.

He was elected as a Republican to the Eighty-fourth United States Congress and to the three succeeding Congresses serving from January 3, 1955 to January 3, 1963. Weaver voted in favor of the Civil Rights Acts of 1957 and 1960, as well as the 24th Amendment to the U.S. Constitution. He was unsuccessful in his bid for renomination in 1962 to the Eighty-eighth United States Congress. He became a special consultant to the U.S. Department of Agriculture from 1963 to 1965. In 1966 he became a deputy director in the Field Cooperations Division, Rural Community Development Service. In 1967 to 1968 he became regional development coordinator for Department of Agriculture, and in 1969 he was promoted to acting administrator of the Rural Community Development Service. From 1969 to 1973 he was the deputy assistant to the U.S. Secretary of Agriculture. He returned to Falls City in 1974 to resume his business interests and was a resident of Falls City until his death there on April 16, 1989.

U.S. House of Representatives
Preceded by Carl T. Curtis (R)	Member of the U.S. House of Representatives from Nebraska's 1st congressional district January 3, 1955 – January 3, 1963	Succeeded by Ralph F. Beermann (R)
