= Hazel Abel =

American educator and politician (1888–1966)

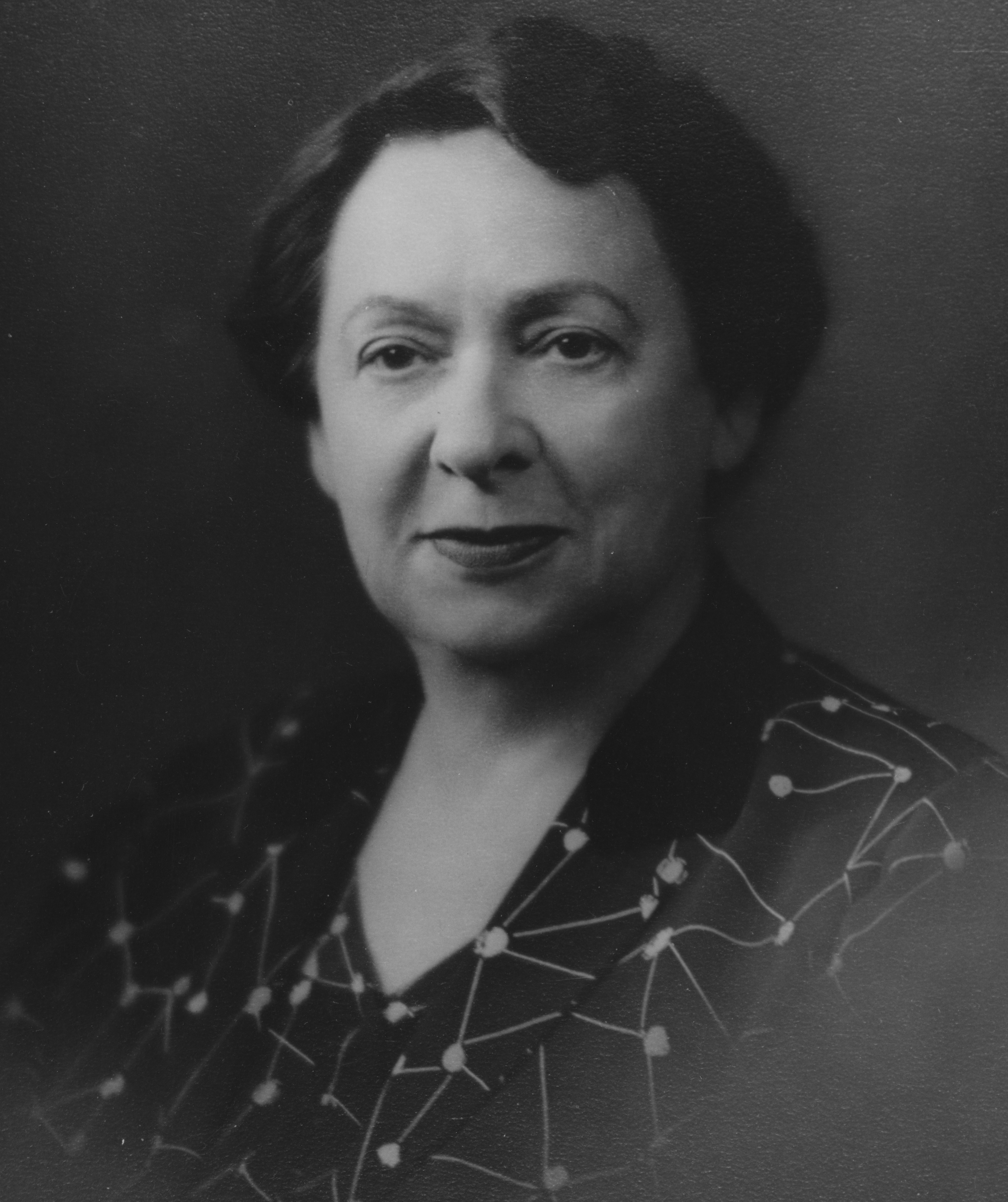

United States Senator from Nebraska
- In office November 8, 1954 – December 31, 1954
- Preceded by: Eva Bowring
- Succeeded by: Carl Curtis

Personal details
- Born: Hazel Hempel; July 10, 1888 Plattsmouth, Nebraska, U.S.
- Died: July 30, 1966 (aged 78) Lincoln, Nebraska, U.S.
- Resting place: Wyuka Cemetery
- Party: Republican
- Spouse: George Abel (m. 1916)
- Children: 5
- Education: University of Nebraska (BA)

Hazel Abel (née Hempel; July 10, 1888 – July 30, 1966) was an American educator and politician in the U.S. state of Nebraska, who served as a member of the United States Senate for fifty-four days in 1954. She was the second woman elected to the Senate from Nebraska, and she remains the shortest-serving senator from Nebraska.

== Early life ==
Abel was born in Plattsmouth, Nebraska, the daughter of Charles Hempel and Ella Hempel. She attended the public schools of Omaha, Nebraska, and graduated from the University of Nebraska in 1908. She worked as a high school mathematics teacher and principal in Papillion, Nebraska, Ashland, Nebraska, and Crete, Nebraska, before working as secretary, treasurer, and eventually president of her husband's construction company.

== Political career ==
Abel was a delegate to the Nebraska State Republican Conventions from 1939 to 1948 and from 1952 to 1956. In 1954 Abel was elected to be the vice chairman of the State Republican Central Committee. That same year she was elected to complete the unexpired term of Sen. Kenneth Spicer Wherry, who had died in office. She became the second woman elected from Nebraska to serve in the Senate, as well as the first woman to follow another woman in a Senate seat, as Eva Bowring had previously been appointed to the seat to serve until an election was held.

She served in the Senate from November 8, 1954, until her resignation on December 31, 1954. She resigned three days before the expiration of her term, to give fellow Republican Carl Curtis of Nebraska, elected to the six–year term in November, a seniority advantage. She later observed that she campaigned for the two–month term to raise the visibility of women in political office. "To me it was more than just a short term in the Senate," Abel recalled for Newsweek. "I wanted Nebraska voters to express their approval of a woman in government. I was sort of a guinea pig." While in the Senate, she voted to censure Sen. Joseph McCarthy from Wisconsin, in the Army–McCarthy hearings. Abel was the fifth of six Senators to serve during the fifteenth Senate term for Nebraska's Class 2 seat (January 3, 1949, to January 3, 1955).

She was a delegate to the White House Conference on Education in 1955, and chairwoman of the Nebraska delegation to the 1956 Republican National Convention. From 1955 to 1959 she was a member of the Theodore Roosevelt Centennial Commission, and in 1957 she was named "American Mother of the Year". She also served as the president and founder of the Nebraska Federation of Republican Women, and was on the board of trustees at Doane College and Nebraska Wesleyan College. She tried unsuccessfully to win the Republican nomination for Governor of Nebraska in 1960.

== Death and legacy ==
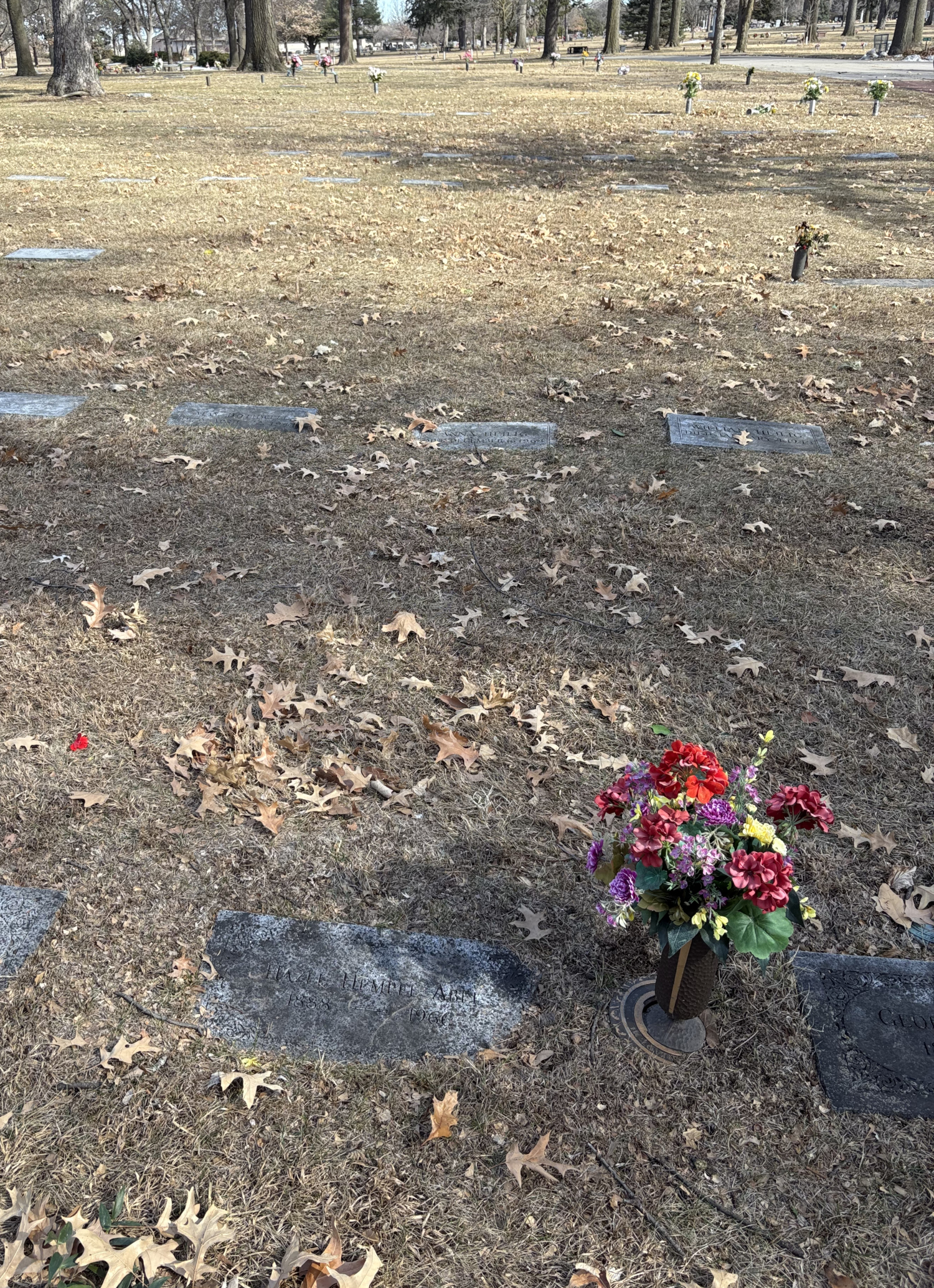
Abel's grave at Wyuka Cemetery

She died in Lincoln, Nebraska, on July 30, 1966, and is interred in Wyuka Cemetery in Lincoln. Hazel Abel Park in Lincoln is named in her honor.

== Family life ==
Abel married George Abel in 1916, and they had five children, Helen, George, Hazel, Alice, and Annette.

== See also ==
- Women in the United States Senate

Party political offices
Preceded by Dwight Griswold	Republican nominee for U.S. Senator from Nebraska (Class 2); 1954 (special)	Succeeded by Carl Curtis
U.S. Senate
Preceded by Eva Bowring	U.S. senator (Class 2) from Nebraska; November 8, 1954 – December 31, 1954; Served alongside: Roman Hruska	Succeeded by Carl Curtis
