= Mabel Gillespie =

American politician

Mabel (Gudmundsen) Gillespie

Member of the Nebraska Legislature from the 7th district
- In office 1925–1937

Personal details
- Born: October 13, 1894 Ord, Nebraska, U.S.
- Died: November 24, 1982 (aged 88) Omaha, Nebraska, U.S.
- Party: Democratic
- Spouse(s): William C. Gillespie; John A. Arehart
- Education: Kearney State Teachers' College
- Occupation: Farmer, teacher, journalist, and politician

Mabel Gillespie (October 13, 1894 – November 24, 1982) was a farmer, teacher, journalist, and politician in Nebraska. In 1925, she was the first woman to be elected as a Nebraska state legislator when she served the first of her six terms. She was the first female reporter in Nebraska to work the general news beat, working for the Omaha Bee from 1916 to 1919. She had three failed campaigns for congress and served on the platform committee at the Democratic National Convention in 1940.

== Life ==
Mabel Gillespie was born on October 13, 1894, in Ord, Nebraska, to Hjalmar and Catheryn (Jensen) Gudmundsen, both born in Denmark. Hjalmar was born at Nysted, Denmark and served in the US Army on the frontier during the Indian Wars and was captain of Company I, Nebraska Volunteer Cavalry in the Spanish–American War. In Nebraska he worked as a very successful lawyer in Valley County and before that a judge in the eleventh judicial district of Nebraska for 21 years. Unlike his daughter, he was a Republican. His ancestors were Icelandic and Danish and both of his grandfathers were orators and statesmen. Mabel had three brothers and four sisters.

Mabel Gillespie attended school at Ord and Superior, graduating from high school at Superior. She graduated also from the Kearney State Teachers' College in 1915, where she was also an assistant instructor in psychology and in the English department. She also taught briefly in Lexington and at Gretna High School. She studied law at the Omaha Law School. and at Creighton University while living in Omaha in the 1910s.

She was married to William C. Gillespie at Omaha, on January 22, 1919, while she was living in Omaha and the pair moved to his parents farm where she lived during her career in the state legislature. The farm was very traditional and had no electricity as late as 1928.

After her first husband died, she married John A Arehart on February 20, 1958, and moved to his home in Lowell, Michigan. John died in 1967, and she moved back to Omaha. Mabel Gillespie died in Omaha in November 1982.

== Career ==
During World War I she joined the Omaha Bee as a reporter on the Omaha South Side. Serving from 1916 to 1919, she was the first woman in Nebraska to do straight news assignments on a metropolitan newspaper. A Democrat, she was the first woman to take the oath of office as state representative in January, 1925. She felt that the legislature should seek fewer, better laws, and introduced one bill in first term, providing increased state funding of bridges. She was a strong supporter of a bill to extend water mains in small towns, believing that this would be a great boon to women. She continued in the house and served five consecutive terms from 1925 to 1935 as representative of the seventh district. In 1937, she lost to Charles McLaughlin.

She served as a delegate to the 1940 Democratic National Convention and was a member of the platform committee. and ran for seats in congress three times. She lost in bid for United States House of Representatives in 1944 against Howard Buffett and lost in the primary in a bid for Senate in 1954. In 1956 she ran again for the House, losing in the primary to Joseph V. Benesch.

Outside of her political career, she served 14 years on a public power district board and worked as clerk of the district court in Sarpy County, Nebraska.

Preceded by John Rutherford Hughes	Nebraska Legislature District 7; 1925–1937	Succeeded by Charles McLaughlin
