= Carl Curtis =

American attorney and politician (1905–2000)

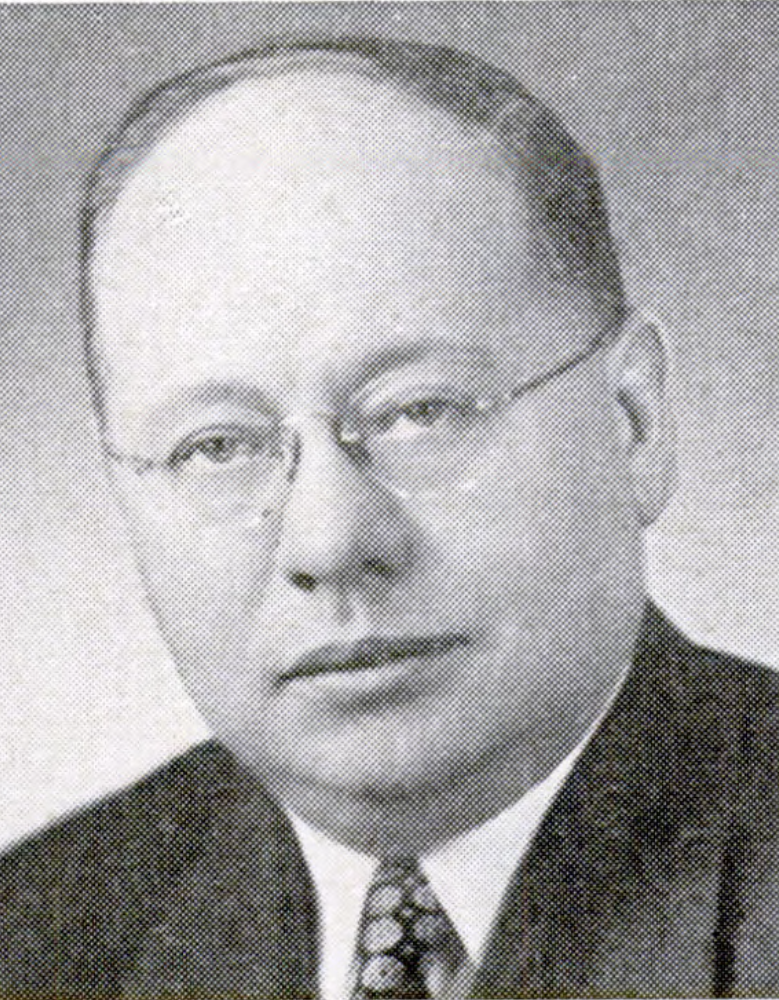

United States Senator from Nebraska
- In office January 1, 1955 – January 3, 1979
- Preceded by: Hazel Abel
- Succeeded by: J. James Exon

Member of the U.S. House of Representatives from Nebraska
- In office January 3, 1939 – December 31, 1954
- Preceded by: Charles Binderup
- Succeeded by: Phil Weaver
- Constituency: 4th district (1939–1943); 1st district (1943–1954)

Personal details
- Born: Carl Thomas Curtis; March 15, 1905 Minden, Nebraska, U.S.
- Died: January 24, 2000 (aged 94) Lincoln, Nebraska, U.S.
- Party: Republican
- Spouse(s): Lois Wylie Atwater (m. 1931; died 1970) Mildred Malvina Genier (m. 1972)
- Children: 2
- Education: Nebraska Wesleyan University

Carl Thomas Curtis (March 15, 1905 – January 24, 2000) was an American attorney and politician from the U.S. state of Nebraska. He served as a Republican in the United States House of Representatives (1939–1954) and later the United States Senate (1955–1979). He remains the second longest-serving senator from Nebraska.

== Early life ==
Curtis was born on his family's farm in Kearney County, Nebraska, near the county seat of Minden. He attended public schools and later attended Nebraska Wesleyan University, where he was a member of Theta Chi. He studied law on his own, passed the bar exam, and began practicing; he served as the county attorney of Kearney County, Nebraska, from 1931 to 1934.

== Career ==
Curtis was elected to the House of Representatives in 1938 on an anti-New Deal platform. He served from 1939 until 1954, being reelected every two years. He ran for the Senate from 1954 and won; subsequently, incumbent Hazel Abel resigned, and Curtis was appointed to the seat on January 1, 1955 to fill the final days of Kenneth S. Wherry's term, who died unexpectedly in 1951, getting a two-day jump on seniority. Curtis thus became the last of six Senators to serve during the fifteenth Senate term for Nebraska's Class 2 seat, from January 3, 1949, to January 3, 1955. He was reelected three more times to six-year terms, serving from 1955 to 1979.

Curtis voted in favor of the Civil Rights Acts of 1957, 1960, 1964, and 1968, as well as the 24th Amendment to the U.S. Constitution, the Voting Rights Act of 1965, and the confirmation of Thurgood Marshall to the U.S. Supreme Court. Curtis was loyal to the Republican Party, particularly supporting its anti-communist stances and fiscal conservatism, which included opposition to social programs such as the New Deal and the Great Society.

He sat on the McClellan Committee (1957–60), which probed organized crime within trade unions. During the 1963 investigation of bribery allegations against Democratic Party organizer Robert Baker, Curtis supposedly leaked a secret memorandum to advance his own positions.

A close ally of both Barry Goldwater and Richard Nixon, Curtis served as floor leader during the 1964 Republican National Convention, when Goldwater won the nomination.

During the early 1970s, Curtis supported President Richard Nixon's Vietnam War escalation policy, and remained loyal to him throughout the Watergate Scandal. On August 6, 1974, two days before Nixon resigned, he implored Congress not to panic. He warned that the United States would become like a "banana republic" if Nixon was ousted in favor of Vice President Ford, who in turn would then select someone to fill the vice presidential slot. He said "this would mean both Ford and the new Vice President would be men who hadn't been elected to their high office, but merely nominated by a President under procedures for filling the vice presidency when it is vacant."

Curtis served as chairman of the Senate Republican Conference from 1975 to 1979.

== Later life ==
Following his retirement, Curtis moved to Lincoln, Nebraska, where he practiced law, served as an officer of the conservative lobby the American Freedom Coalition, and gave occasional interviews to the media.

Curtis died in Lincoln on January 24, 2000, and is interred at Minden Cemetery in Minden, his longtime hometown. Following his death, he was praised on the floor by Strom Thurmond, a contemporary who had also been first elected to the Senate in 1954.

== Notes and references ==
U.S. House of Representatives
Preceded by Charles Gustav Binderup	Member of the U.S. House of Representatives from Nebraska's 4th congressional district 1939–1943	Succeeded by Arthur L. Miller
Preceded by Oren S. Copeland	Member of the U.S. House of Representatives from Nebraska's 1st congressional district 1943–1954	Succeeded by Phillip Hart Weaver
Party political offices
Preceded by Hazel Abel	Republican nominee for U.S. Senator from Nebraska (Class 2); 1954, 1960, 1966, 1972	Succeeded by Donald Shasteen
New office	Chair of the Senate Republican Steering Committee; 1974–1975	Succeeded by Jim McClure
Preceded by Norris Cotton	Chair of the Senate Republican Conference; 1975–1979	Succeeded by Bob Packwood
U.S. Senate
Preceded by Hazel Abel	U.S. Senator (Class 2) from Nebraska; 1955–1979; Served alongside: Roman Hruska, Edward Zorinsky	Succeeded by J. James Exon
Preceded by Margaret Chase Smith	Ranking Member of the Senate Space Committee; 1971–1973	Succeeded by Barry Goldwater
Preceded by Jack Miller	Ranking Member of the Senate Agriculture Committee; 1973–1975	Succeeded by Bob Dole
Honorary titles
Preceded by Jennings Randolph	Most senior living U.S. representative (Sitting or Former); 1998–2000	Succeeded by Edwin Arthur Hall
