= Arthur L. Miller =

American politician (1892–1967)

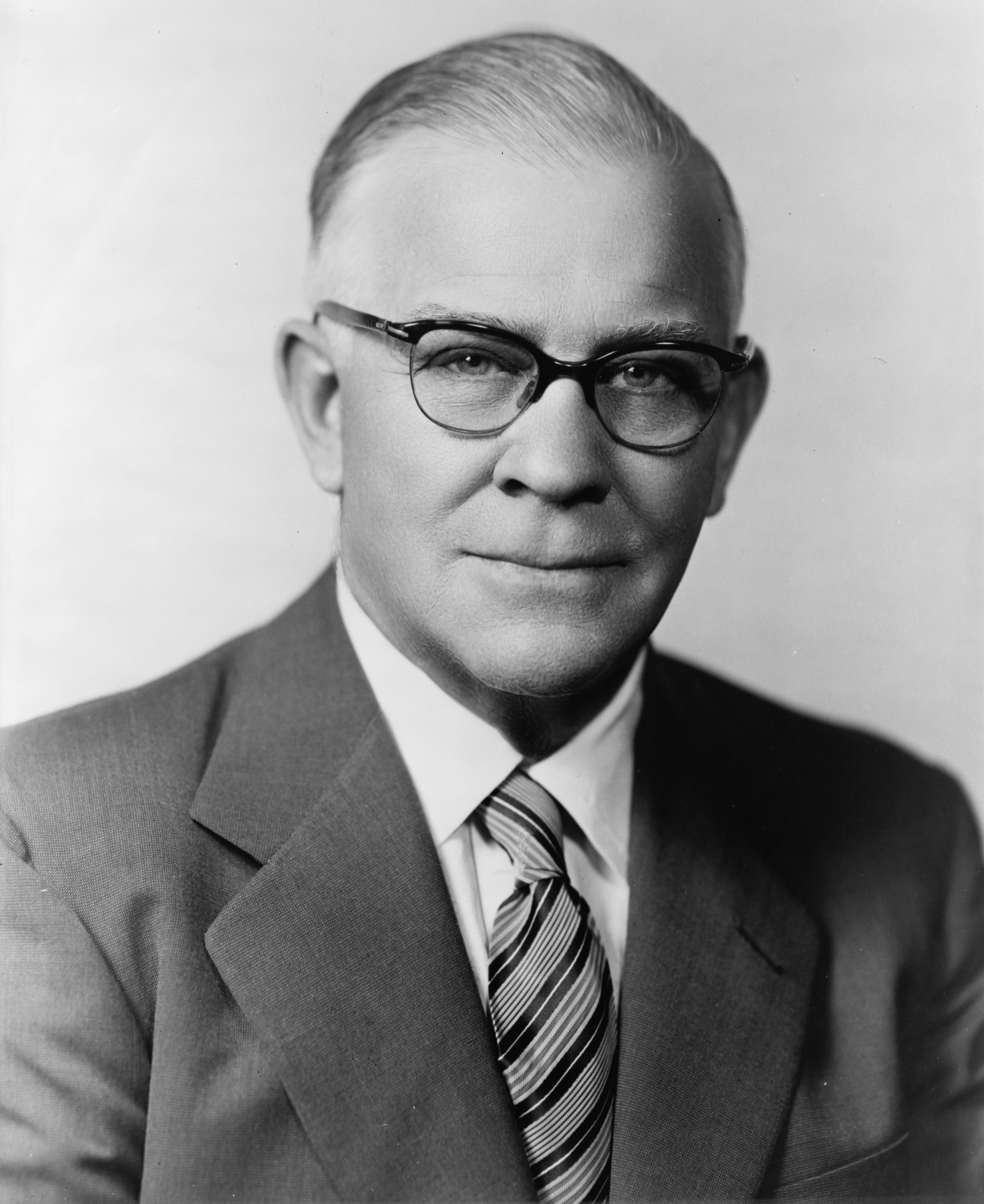

Member of the U.S. House of Representatives from Nebraska's 4th district
- In office January 3, 1943 – January 3, 1959
- Preceded by: Carl T. Curtis
- Succeeded by: Donald F. McGinley

Member of the Nebraska Legislature
- In office 1937–1941

Personal details
- Born: Arthur Lewis Miller; May 24, 1892 Plainview, Nebraska, U.S.
- Died: March 16, 1967 (aged 74) Chevy Chase, Maryland, U.S.
- Party: Republican
- Education: Loyola University Chicago

Arthur Lewis Miller (May 24, 1892 – March 16, 1967) was a Nebraska Republican politician.

Born on a farm near Plainview, Nebraska, he graduated from the Plainview High School in 1911. He then taught rural school in Plainview from 1911 to 1913. He then studied at Loyola Medical School in Chicago, from which he graduated in 1918. He was a member of the United States Medical Reserve Corps. He was a surgeon and practiced medicine in Kimball, Nebraska from 1919 to 1942.

He was also a farmer and the mayor of Kimball in 1933 and 1934. He was a member of the Nebraska unicameral legislature from 1937 to 1941. He ran against Dwight Griswold and lost in the Republican gubernatorial primary of 1940. Dwight Griswold then went on to become governor of Nebraska. He was the state health director in 1941 and 1942. In 1942 he gave up his medical practices and ran for the Seventy-eighth Congress. He was elected and then was reelected seven times (January 3, 1943 – January 3, 1959) to represent Nebraska's 4th district in the House of Representatives as a Republican. Miller voted in favor of the Civil Rights Act of 1957. During his time in the Eighty-third Congress, he was the chairman of the U.S. House Committee on Interior and Insular Affairs.

In 1944 Rep. Miller released private political correspondence he had exchanged with General Douglas MacArthur. Some experts felt it ruined any chance for MacArthur to receive the Republican presidential nomination that year as MacArthur had not intended for his comments to be made public.

He authored the Sexual Psychopath Law in 1948 for DC, nicknamed the “Miller Law”, and which made sodomy punishable by twenty years in prison. Additionally those arrested had to undergo psychiatric assessment and if they were regarded as not having control of their (homosexual) sexual impulses then they could be detained indefinitely in the criminal ward of the Washington psychiatric hospital until “recovered” and without recourse first to the courts. Miller worked to purge gay people from US government employment during the lavender scare, saying homosexuals were "not to be trusted" because they were susceptible to blackmail by communists.

He was an unsuccessful candidate for reelection in 1958 to the Eighty-sixth Congress. He then became the director of the Office of Saline Water in the Department of the Interior from February 1959 to January 1961. He died in Chevy Chase, Maryland, and is buried in Parklawn Cemetery in Rockville, Maryland.

U.S. House of Representatives
Preceded by Carl T. Curtis (R)	Member of the U.S. House of Representatives from Nebraska's 4th congressional district January 3, 1943 – January 3, 1959	Succeeded by Donald Francis McGinley (D)
Political offices
Preceded by John R. Murdock; Arizona	Chairman of House Interior and Insular Affairs Committee; 1953–1955	Succeeded by Clair Engle; California
