= R. D. Harrison =

American politician (1897–1977)

Robert Dinsmore Harrison
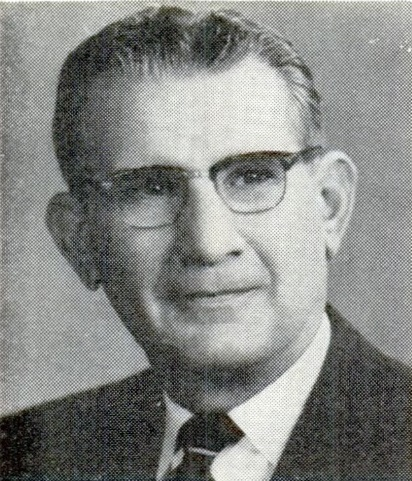
- Pocket Congressional Directory of the Eighty-Fifth Congress (1957)

Member of the U.S. House of Representatives from Nebraska's 3rd district
- In office December 4, 1951 – January 3, 1959
- Preceded by: Karl Stefan
- Succeeded by: Lawrence Brock

Personal details
- Born: January 26, 1897 near Panama, Nebraska
- Died: June 11, 1977 (aged 80) Norfolk, Nebraska
- Party: Republican

Robert Dinsmore Harrison (January 26, 1897 – June 11, 1977) was a Nebraska Republican politician.

Born on a farm near Panama, Nebraska on January 26, 1897, he graduated from Nebraska State Teachers College, now known as Peru State College in 1926. He also graduated from University of California in 1928 and University of Nebraska in 1934. In 1918 to 1919, during World War I, he was a sergeant in the Twenty-second Engineers. He was the superintendent of schools in Bradshaw, Nebraska (1926–1929) and De Witt, Nebraska (1929–1937). He was a member of the school board of Norfolk, Nebraska from 1942 to 1951 and a member of the Governor's Highway Advisory Committee. He owned an oil business in Norfolk and a farm in Cedar County, Nebraska.

He was elected as a Republican to the Eighty-second United States Congress, December 4, 1951, in a special election to fill the vacancy caused by the death of Karl Stefan. He was reelected to the three succeeding Congresses and served from December 4, 1951, to January 3, 1959. Harrison voted in favor of the Civil Rights Act of 1957. He unsuccessfully ran for reelection in 1958 to the Eighty-sixth Congress. He was an adviser to Board of Directors of the Commodity Credit Corporation in the U.S. Department of Agriculture from January 6, 1959 to April 1, 1960. He was then appointed the Nebraska director for the Federal Crop Insurance Corporation on April 1, 1960 and served until February 1, 1962. He ran unsuccessfully for election in 1962 to the Eighty-eighth United States Congress. He retired to Norfolk where he died June 11, 1977. He is buried in Panama Cemetery.

U.S. House of Representatives
| Preceded by Karl Stefan (R) | Member of the U.S. House of Representatives from Nebraska's 3rd congressional district December 4, 1951 – January 3, 1959 | Succeeded by Lawrence Brock (D) |
