= 1954 United States House of Representatives elections =

House elections for the 84th U.S. Congress

- November 2, 1954 (Note: September 13, 1954 in Maine)

All 435 seats in the United States House of Representatives 218 seats needed for a majority
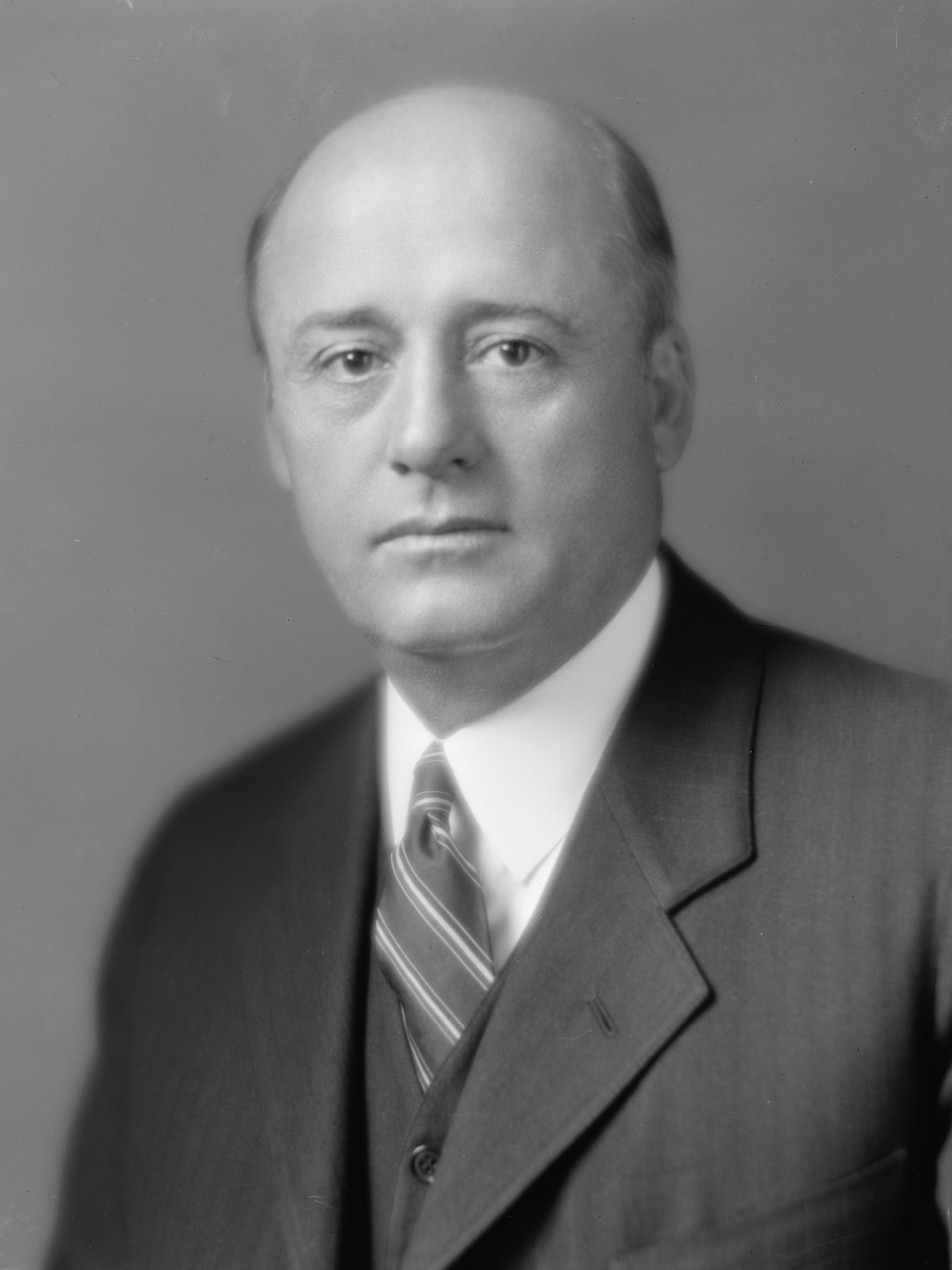

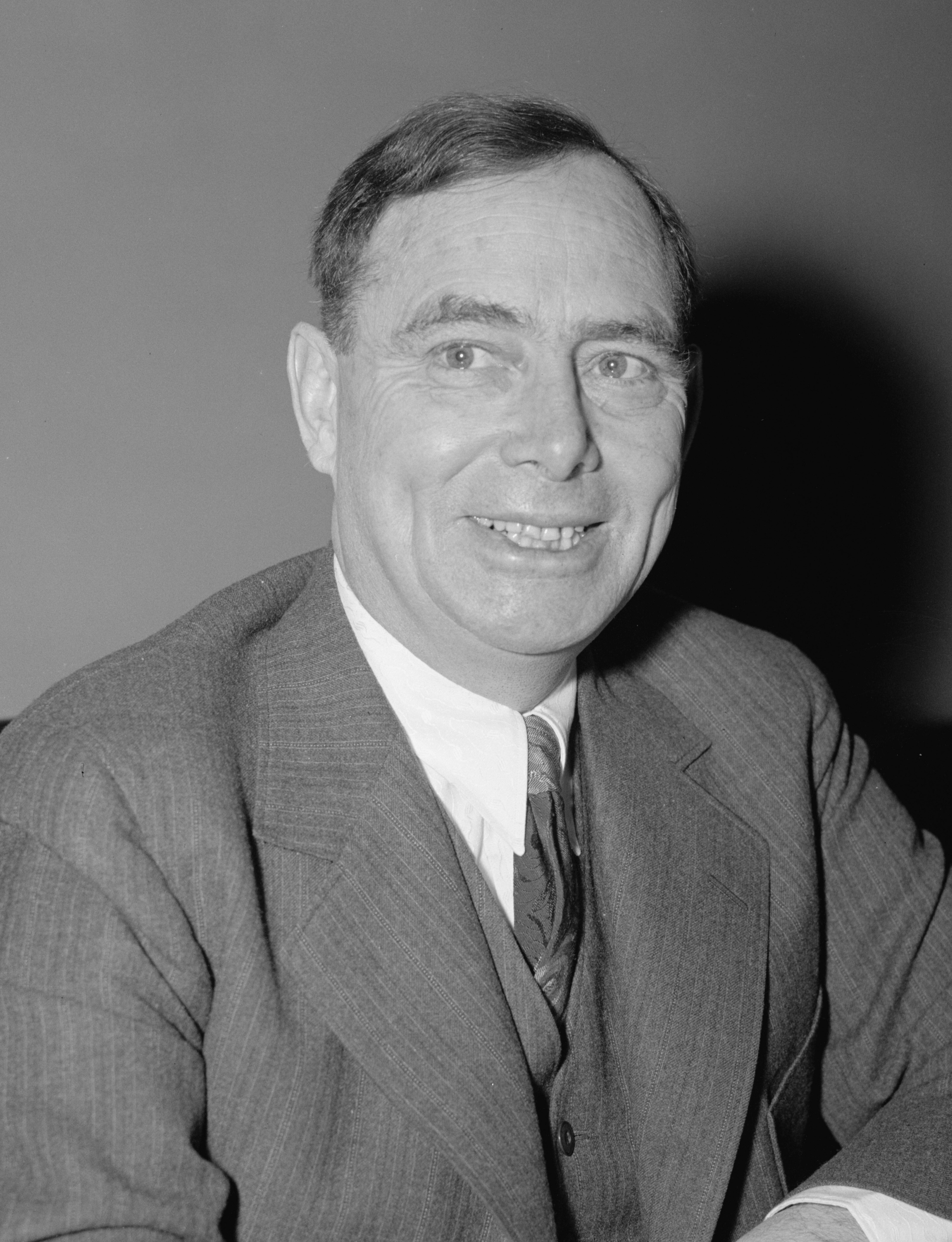
	Majority party	Minority party
Leader	Sam Rayburn	Joseph Martin
Party	Democratic	Republican
Leader since	September 16, 1940	January 3, 1939
Leader's seat	Texas 4th	Massachusetts 14th
Last election	213 seats	221 seats
Seats won	232	203
Seat change	▲19	▼18
Popular vote	22,366,386	20,016,809
Percentage	52.5%	47.0%
Swing	▲2.7pp	▼2.3pp
- Results: Democratic hold Democratic gain Republican hold Republican gain
Speaker before election
Joseph Martin
Republican
Elected Speaker
Sam Rayburn
Democratic

The 1954 United States House of Representatives elections was an election for the United States House of Representatives to elect members to serve in the 84th United States Congress. They were held for the most part on November 2, 1954, in the middle of Dwight Eisenhower's first presidential term, while Maine held theirs on September 13. Eisenhower's Republican Party lost eighteen seats in the House, giving the Democratic Party a majority that it would retain in every House election until 1994. This was nonetheless the first occasion when a Republican won a seat from Florida since 1882, and the first when the GOP won a seat from Texas since 1930.

Perhaps the major reason for the Republican defeat was the backlash against the Army–McCarthy Hearings, in which prominent Republican Senator Joseph McCarthy accused countless political and intellectual figures of having communist ties, usually with no evidence. Another issue was the Dixon–Yates contract to supply power to the Atomic Energy Commission. Other factors included a comment made in Detroit by Defense Secretary Charles Wilson, former president of General Motors, equating unemployed auto workers with "lazy kennel dogs who sit... and yell."

However, it has been pointed out that losses in the midterm election were considerably less than the White House party generally faces in the midterm elections, and this has been attributed to the overall popularity of President Eisenhower, who participated in the campaign along with Vice President Richard Nixon and other members of the cabinet.

Sam Rayburn of Texas became Speaker of the House, exchanging places with new Minority Leader Joseph W. Martin Jr. of Massachusetts; they went back to what they had been before the 1952 elections.

As of 2024, this is the last time a party lost control of the House of Representatives just two years after flipping it.

== Overall results ==
407 incumbent members sought reelection, but 6 were defeated in primaries and 22 defeated in the general election for a total of 379 incumbents winning.

↓
232	203
Democratic	Republican

Party	Total seats	Change	Seat percentage	Vote percentage	Popular vote
Democratic	232	▲19	53.3%	52.5%	22,366,386
Republican	203	▼18	46.6%	47.0%	20,016,809
Liberal	0	Steady	0.0%	0.2%	79,946
Independent	0	▼1	0.0%	0.2%	74,486
American Labor	0	Steady	0.0%	<0.1%	14,560
Prohibition	0	Steady	0.0%	<0.1%	8,591
Progressive	0	Steady	0.0%	<0.1%	6,614
Socialist	0	Steady	0.0%	<0.1%	5,828
Socialist Labor	0	Steady	0.0%	<0.1%	1,652
Social Democratic	0	Steady	0.0%	<0.1%	150
Socialist Workers	0	Steady	0.0%	<0.1%	114
Militant Workers	0	Steady	0.0%	<0.1%	99
Others	0	Steady	0.0%	<0.1%	7,692
Totals	435	0	100.0%	100.0%	42,582,927
Source: Election Statistics – Office of the Clerk

Popular vote
Democratic	52.52%
Republican	47.01%
Others	0.47%

House seats
Democratic	53.33%
Republican	46.67%

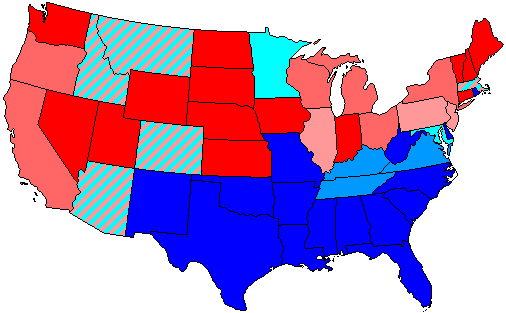
Seats by party holding plurality in state: 80.1-100% Democratic / 80.1-100% Republican; 60.1-80% Democratic / 60.1-80% Republican; Up to 60% Democratic / Up to 60% Republican

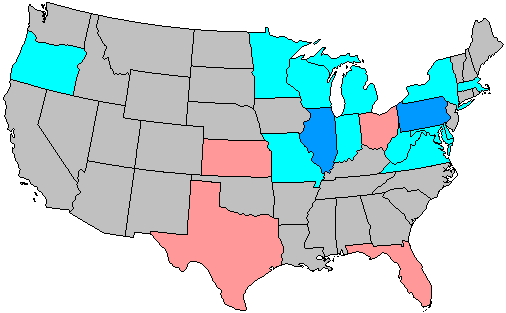
6+ Republican gain: 3-5 Democratic gain / 3-5 Republican gain; 1-2 Democratic gain / 1-2 Republican gain; no net change

== September elections ==
[data missing]

== Alabama ==
District	Incumbent	Party	First elected	Result	Candidates
Alabama 1	Frank W. Boykin	Democratic	1935 (special)	Incumbent re-elected.	▌ ✓ Frank W. Boykin (Democratic) Uncontested
Alabama 2	George M. Grant	Democratic	1938	Incumbent re-elected.	▌ ✓ George M. Grant (Democratic) Uncontested
Alabama 3	George W. Andrews	Democratic	1944	Incumbent re-elected.	▌ ✓ George W. Andrews (Democratic) Uncontested
Alabama 4	Kenneth A. Roberts	Democratic	1950	Incumbent re-elected.	▌ ✓ Kenneth A. Roberts (Democratic) Uncontested
Alabama 5	Albert Rains	Democratic	1944	Incumbent re-elected.	▌ ✓ Albert Rains (Democratic) Uncontested
Alabama 6	Armistead Selden	Democratic	1952	Incumbent re-elected.	▌ ✓ Armistead Selden (Democratic) Uncontested
Alabama 7	Carl Elliott	Democratic	1948	Incumbent re-elected.	▌ ✓ Carl Elliott (Democratic) 78.9%; ▌W. G. Engle (Republican) 21.1%
Alabama 8	Robert E. Jones Jr.	Democratic	1947 (special)	Incumbent re-elected.	▌ ✓ Robert E. Jones Jr. (Democratic) 91.6%; ▌Adin Batson (Republican) 8.4%
Alabama 9	Laurie C. Battle	Democratic	1946	Incumbent retired to run for U.S. Senator. Democratic hold.	▌ ✓ George Huddleston Jr. (Democratic) Uncontested

== Arizona ==
District	Incumbent	Party	First elected	Result	Candidates
Arizona 1	John Jacob Rhodes	Republican	1952	Incumbent re-elected.	▌ ✓ John Jacob Rhodes (Republican) 53.1%; ▌L. S. Adams (Democratic) 46.9%
Arizona 2	Harold Patten	Democratic	1948	Incumbent retired. Democratic hold.	▌ ✓ Stewart Udall (Democratic) 62.1%; ▌Henry Zipf (Republican) 37.9%

== Arkansas ==
District	Incumbent	Party	First elected	Result	Candidates
Arkansas 1	Ezekiel C. Gathings	Democratic	1938	Incumbent re-elected.	▌ ✓ Ezekiel C. Gathings (Democratic) Uncontested
Arkansas 2	Wilbur Mills	Democratic	1938	Incumbent re-elected.	▌ ✓ Wilbur Mills (Democratic) Uncontested
Arkansas 3	James William Trimble	Democratic	1944	Incumbent re-elected.	▌ ✓ James William Trimble (Democratic) Uncontested
Arkansas 4	Oren Harris	Democratic	1940	Incumbent re-elected.	▌ ✓ Oren Harris (Democratic) Uncontested
Arkansas 5	Brooks Hays	Democratic	1942	Incumbent re-elected.	▌ ✓ Brooks Hays (Democratic) Uncontested
Arkansas 6	William F. Norrell	Democratic	1938	Incumbent re-elected.	▌ ✓ William F. Norrell (Democratic) Uncontested

== California ==
Of the thirty races, two incumbents retired and were replaced by new members from their party; one Republican lost re-election to a Democrat and one Democrat lost re-election to a Republican; and twenty six incumbents were re-elected.

District	Incumbent	Party	First elected	Result	Candidates
California 1	Hubert B. Scudder	Republican	1948	Incumbent re-elected.	▌ ✓ Hubert B. Scudder (Republican) 59.1%; ▌William M. Kortum (Democratic) 40.9%
California 2	Clair Engle	Democratic	1943 (special)	Incumbent re-elected.	▌ ✓ Clair Engle (Democratic) Uncontested
California 3	John E. Moss	Democratic	1952	Incumbent re-elected.	▌ ✓ John E. Moss (Democratic) 65.3%; ▌James H. Phillips (Republican) 34.7%
California 4	William S. Mailliard	Republican	1952	Incumbent re-elected.	▌ ✓ William S. Mailliard (Republican) 61.2%; ▌Philip A. O'Rourke (Democratic) 36.7%; ▌George R. Andersen (Ind. Progressive) 2.1%
California 5	John F. Shelley	Democratic	1949 (special)	Incumbent re-elected.	▌ ✓ John F. Shelley (Democratic) Uncontested
California 6	Robert Condon	Democratic	1952	Incumbent lost re-election. Republican gain.	▌ ✓ John F. Baldwin Jr. (Republican) 50.9%; ▌Robert Condon (Democratic) 49.1%
California 7	John J. Allen Jr.	Republican	1946	Incumbent re-elected.	▌ ✓ John J. Allen Jr. (Republican) 53.0%; ▌Stanley K. Crook (Democratic) 47.0%
California 8	George P. Miller	Democratic	1944	Incumbent re-elected.	▌ ✓ George P. Miller (Democratic) 65.4%; ▌Jesse M. Ritchie (Republican) 34.6%
California 9	J. Arthur Younger	Republican	1952	Incumbent re-elected.	▌ ✓ J. Arthur Younger (Republican) 54.5%; ▌Harold F. Taggart (Democratic) 45.5%
California 10	Charles Gubser	Republican	1952	Incumbent re-elected.	▌ ✓ Charles Gubser (Republican) 61.2%; ▌Paul V. Birmingham (Democratic) 38.8%
California 11	J. Leroy Johnson	Republican	1942	Incumbent re-elected.	▌ ✓ J. Leroy Johnson (Republican) 52.6%; ▌Carl Sugar (Democratic) 47.4%
California 12	Allan O. Hunter	Republican	1950	Incumbent lost re-election. Democratic gain.	▌ ✓ B. F. Sisk (Democratic) 53.8%; ▌Allan O. Hunter (Republican) 46.2%
California 13	Ernest K. Bramblett	Republican	1946	Incumbent retired. Republican hold.	▌ ✓ Charles M. Teague (Republican) 52.5%; ▌Timothy I. O'Reilly (Democratic) 47.5%
California 14	Harlan Hagen	Democratic	1952	Incumbent re-elected.	▌ ✓ Harlan Hagen (Democratic) 65.1%; ▌Al Blain (Republican) 34.9%
California 15	Gordon L. McDonough	Republican	1944	Incumbent re-elected.	▌ ✓ Gordon L. McDonough (Republican) 56.9%; ▌Frank P. O'Sullivan (Democratic) 43.1%
California 16	Donald L. Jackson	Republican	1946	Incumbent re-elected.	▌ ✓ Donald L. Jackson (Republican) 60.8%; ▌S. Mark Hogue (Democratic) 39.2%
California 17	Cecil R. King	Democratic	1942	Incumbent re-elected.	▌ ✓ Cecil R. King (Democratic) 60.1%; ▌Robert Finch (Republican) 39.9%
California 18	Craig Hosmer	Republican	1952	Incumbent re-elected.	▌ ✓ Craig Hosmer (Republican) 55.0%; ▌Joseph M. Kennick (Democratic) 45.0%
California 19	Chet Holifield	Democratic	1942	Incumbent re-elected.	▌ ✓ Chet Holifield (Democratic) 74.8%; ▌Raymond R. Pritchard (Republican) 25.2%
California 20	John Carl Hinshaw	Republican	1938	Incumbent re-elected.	▌ ✓ John Carl Hinshaw (Republican) 71.2%; ▌Eugene Radding (Democratic) 28.8%
California 21	Edgar W. Hiestand	Republican	1952	Incumbent re-elected.	▌ ✓ Edgar W. Hiestand (Republican) 58.7%; ▌Bill Roskam (Democratic) 41.3%
California 22	Joseph F. Holt	Republican	1952	Incumbent re-elected.	▌ ✓ Joseph F. Holt (Republican) 58.2%; ▌Bill Costley (Democratic) 41.8%
California 23	Clyde Doyle	Democratic	1948	Incumbent re-elected.	▌ ✓ Clyde Doyle (Democratic) 70.9%; ▌Frank G. Bussing (Republican) 27.3%; ▌Olive T. Thompson (Ind. Progressive) 1.8%
California 24	Glenard P. Lipscomb	Republican	1953	Incumbent re-elected.	▌ ✓ Glenard P. Lipscomb (Republican) 56.9%; ▌George Arnold (Democratic) 43.1%
California 25	Patrick J. Hillings	Republican	1950	Incumbent re-elected.	▌ ✓ Patrick J. Hillings (Republican) 65.2%; ▌John G. Sobieski (Democratic) 34.8%
California 26	Sam Yorty	Democratic	1950	Incumbent retired to run for U.S. Senator. Democratic hold.	▌ ✓ James Roosevelt (Democratic) 60.1%; ▌Ted Owings (Republican) 39.9%
California 27	Harry R. Sheppard	Democratic	1936	Incumbent re-elected.	▌ ✓ Harry R. Sheppard (Democratic) 64.8%; ▌Martin K. Barrett (Republican) 35.2%
California 28	James B. Utt	Republican	1952	Incumbent re-elected.	▌ ✓ James B. Utt (Republican) 66.2%; ▌Harriet Enderle (Democratic) 33.8%
California 29	John Phillips	Republican	1942	Incumbent re-elected.	▌ ✓ John Phillips (Republican) 58.0%; ▌Bruce Shangle (Democratic) 42.0%
California 30	Bob Wilson	Republican	1952	Incumbent re-elected.	▌ ✓ Bob Wilson (Republican) 60.4%; ▌Ross T. McIntire (Democratic) 39.6%

== Colorado ==
District	Incumbent	Party	First elected	Result	Candidates
Colorado 1	Byron G. Rogers	Democratic	1950	Incumbent re-elected.	▌ ✓ Byron G. Rogers (Democratic) 55.6%; ▌Ellen G. Harris (Republican) 44.1%; ▌Carle Whitehead (Socialist) 0.3%
Colorado 2	William S. Hill	Republican	1940	Incumbent re-elected.	▌ ✓ William S. Hill (Republican) 55.3%; ▌Lacy L. Wilkinson (Democratic) 44.7%
Colorado 3	John Chenoweth	Republican	1950	Incumbent re-elected.	▌ ✓ John Chenoweth (Republican) 53.0%; ▌Alva B. Adams (Democratic) 47.0%
Colorado 4	Wayne N. Aspinall	Democratic	1948	Incumbent re-elected.	▌ ✓ Wayne N. Aspinall (Democratic) 53.5%; ▌Charles E. Wilson (Republican) 46.5%

== Connecticut ==
District	Incumbent	Party	First elected	Result	Candidates
Connecticut 1	Thomas J. Dodd	Democratic	1952	Incumbent re-elected.	▌ ✓ Thomas J. Dodd (Democratic) 57.0%; ▌Wallace Barnes (Republican) 43.0%
Connecticut 2	Horace Seely-Brown Jr.	Republican	1950	Incumbent re-elected.	▌ ✓ Horace Seely-Brown Jr. (Republican) 50.7%; ▌Henry H. Pierce Jr. (Democratic) 49.3%
Connecticut 3	Albert W. Cretella	Republican	1952	Incumbent re-elected.	▌ ✓ Albert W. Cretella (Republican) 52.7%; ▌James F. Gartland (Democratic) 47.3%
Connecticut 4	Albert P. Morano	Republican	1950	Incumbent re-elected.	▌ ✓ Albert P. Morano (Republican) 56.2%; ▌Edward R. Fay Jr. (Democratic) 41.4%; ▌Stanley Mayhew (Socialist) 2.5%
Connecticut 5	James T. Patterson	Republican	1946	Incumbent re-elected.	▌ ✓ James T. Patterson (Republican) 52.8%; ▌David Brady (Democratic) 47.2%
Connecticut at-large	Antoni Sadlak	Republican	1946	Incumbent re-elected.	▌ ✓ Antoni Sadlak (Republican) 51.0%; ▌Joseph P. Lyford (Democratic) 49.0%

== Delaware ==
District	Incumbent	Party	First elected	Result	Candidates
Delaware at-large	Herbert Warburton	Republican	1952	Incumbent retired to run for U.S. Senator. Democratic gain.	▌ ✓ Harris McDowell (Democratic) 54.9%; ▌Lillian I. Martin (Republican) 45.1%

== Florida ==
District	Incumbent	Party	First elected	Result	Candidates
Florida 1	Courtney W. Campbell	Democratic	1952	Incumbent lost re-election. Republican gain.	▌ ✓ William C. Cramer (Republican) 50.7%; ▌Courtney W. Campbell (Democratic) 49.3%
Florida 2	Charles E. Bennett	Democratic	1948	Incumbent re-elected.	▌ ✓ Charles E. Bennett (Democratic) Uncontested
Florida 3	Bob Sikes	Democratic	1940; 1944 (resigned); 1944	Incumbent re-elected.	▌ ✓ Bob Sikes (Democratic) Uncontested
Florida 4	Bill Lantaff	Democratic	1950	Incumbent retired. Democratic hold.	▌ ✓ Dante Fascell (Democratic) Uncontested
Florida 5	Syd Herlong	Democratic	1948	Incumbent re-elected.	▌ ✓ Syd Herlong (Democratic) Uncontested
Florida 6	Dwight L. Rogers	Democratic	1944	Incumbent re-elected.	▌ ✓ Dwight L. Rogers (Democratic) Uncontested
Florida 7	James A. Haley	Democratic	1952	Incumbent re-elected.	▌ ✓ James A. Haley (Democratic) 55.5%; ▌Ernest B. Sutton (Republican) 44.5%
Florida 8	Donald Ray Matthews	Democratic	1952	Incumbent re-elected.	▌ ✓ Donald Ray Matthews (Democratic) Uncontested

== Georgia ==
District	Incumbent	Party	First elected	Result	Candidates
Georgia 1	Prince Preston	Democratic	1946	Incumbent re-elected.	▌ ✓ Prince Preston (Democratic) 83.7% Others 16.3%
Georgia 2	J. L. Pilcher	Democratic	1953	Incumbent re-elected.	▌ ✓ J. L. Pilcher (Democratic) Uncontested
Georgia 3	Tic Forrester	Democratic	1950	Incumbent re-elected.	▌ ✓ Tic Forrester (Democratic) Uncontested
Georgia 4	Albert Sidney Camp	Democratic	1939	Incumbent died July 24, 1954. Democratic hold. Winner also elected to finish the current term; see above.	▌ ✓ John Flynt (Democratic) Uncontested
Georgia 5	James C. Davis	Democratic	1946	Incumbent re-elected.	▌ ✓ James C. Davis (Democratic) 64.4%; ▌Charles A. Moye Jr. (Republican) 35.6%
Georgia 6	Carl Vinson	Democratic	1914	Incumbent re-elected.	▌ ✓ Carl Vinson (Democratic) Uncontested
Georgia 7	Henderson Lanham	Democratic	1946	Incumbent re-elected.	▌ ✓ Henderson Lanham (Democratic) Uncontested
Georgia 8	William M. Wheeler	Democratic	1946	Incumbent lost renomination. Democratic hold.	▌ ✓ Iris Faircloth Blitch (Democratic) Uncontested
Georgia 9	Phil Landrum	Democratic	1952	Incumbent re-elected.	▌ ✓ Phil Landrum (Democratic) Uncontested
Georgia 10	Paul Brown	Democratic	1933	Incumbent re-elected.	▌ ✓ Paul Brown (Democratic) Uncontested

== Idaho ==
District	Incumbent	Party	First elected	Result	Candidates
Idaho 1	Gracie Pfost	Democratic	1952	Incumbent re-elected.	▌ ✓ Gracie Pfost (Democratic) 54.9%; ▌Erwin H. Schwiebert (Republican) 45.1%
Idaho 2	Hamer H. Budge	Republican	1950	Incumbent re-elected.	▌ ✓ Hamer H. Budge (Republican) 60.8%; ▌William P. Whitaker (Democratic) 39.2%

== Illinois ==
District	Incumbent	Party	First elected	Result	Candidates
Illinois 1	William L. Dawson	Democratic	1942	Incumbent re-elected.	▌ ✓ William L. Dawson (Democratic) 75.3%; ▌Genoa S. Washington (Republican) 24.7%
Illinois 2	Barratt O'Hara	Democratic	1948; 1950 (lost); 1952	Incumbent re-elected.	▌ ✓ Barratt O'Hara (Democratic) 61.6%; ▌Richard B. Vail (Republican) 38.4%
Illinois 3	Fred E. Busbey	Republican	1950	Incumbent lost re-election. Democratic gain.	▌ ✓ James C. Murray (Democratic) 53.8%; ▌Fred E. Busbey (Republican) 46.2%
Illinois 4	William E. McVey	Republican	1950	Incumbent re-elected.	▌ ✓ William E. McVey (Republican) 52.1%; ▌William A. Rowan (Democratic) 47.9%
Illinois 5	John C. Kluczynski	Democratic	1950	Incumbent re-elected.	▌ ✓ John C. Kluczynski (Democratic) 73.2%; ▌S. Charles Bubacz (Republican) 26.8%
Illinois 6	Thomas J. O'Brien	Democratic	1942	Incumbent re-elected.	▌ ✓ Thomas J. O'Brien (Democratic) 71.7%; ▌Orville F. Corbin (Republican) 28.3%
Illinois 7	James Bowler	Democratic	1953	Incumbent re-elected.	▌ ✓ James Bowler (Democratic) 78.4%; ▌Charles M. Barrett (Republican) 21.6%
Illinois 8	Thomas S. Gordon	Democratic	1942	Incumbent re-elected.	▌ ✓ Thomas S. Gordon (Democratic) 68.4%; ▌James L. Doherty (Republican) 31.6%
Illinois 9	Sidney R. Yates	Democratic	1948	Incumbent re-elected.	▌ ✓ Sidney R. Yates (Democratic) 60.3%; ▌Ralph Lee Goodman (Republican) 39.7%
Illinois 10	Richard W. Hoffman	Republican	1948	Incumbent re-elected.	▌ ✓ Richard W. Hoffman (Republican) 57.3%; ▌Helen J. Kelleher (Democratic) 42.7%
Illinois 11	Timothy P. Sheehan	Republican	1950	Incumbent re-elected.	▌ ✓ Timothy P. Sheehan (Republican) 50.9%; ▌Harry H. Semrow (Democratic) 49.1%
Illinois 12	Edgar A. Jonas	Republican	1948	Incumbent lost re-election. Democratic gain.	▌ ✓ Charles A. Boyle (Democratic) 54.1%; ▌Edgar A. Jonas (Republican) 45.9%
Illinois 13	Marguerite S. Church	Republican	1950	Incumbent re-elected.	▌ ✓ Marguerite S. Church (Republican) 69.6%; ▌Richard A. Griffin (Democratic) 30.4%
Illinois 14	Chauncey W. Reed	Republican	1934	Incumbent re-elected.	▌ ✓ Chauncey W. Reed (Republican) 72.4%; ▌Richard Plum (Democratic) 27.6%
Illinois 15	Noah M. Mason	Republican	1936	Incumbent re-elected.	▌ ✓ Noah M. Mason (Republican) 62.8%; ▌Richard A. Mohan (Democratic) 37.2%
Illinois 16	Leo E. Allen	Republican	1932	Incumbent re-elected.	▌ ✓ Leo E. Allen (Republican) Uncontested
Illinois 17	Leslie C. Arends	Republican	1934	Incumbent re-elected.	▌ ✓ Leslie C. Arends (Republican) 65.0%; ▌Branson Wright (Democratic) 35.0%
Illinois 18	Harold H. Velde	Republican	1948	Incumbent re-elected.	▌ ✓ Harold H. Velde (Republican) 57.5%; ▌Howard S. Beeney (Democratic) 42.5%
Illinois 19	Robert B. Chiperfield	Republican	1938	Incumbent re-elected.	▌ ✓ Robert B. Chiperfield (Republican) 56.5%; ▌John M. Kerwin Jr. (Democratic) 43.5%
Illinois 20	Sid Simpson	Republican	1942	Incumbent re-elected.	▌ ✓ Sid Simpson (Republican) 62.9%; ▌James A. Barry (Democratic) 37.1%
Illinois 21	Peter F. Mack Jr.	Democratic	1948	Incumbent re-elected.	▌ ✓ Peter F. Mack Jr. (Democratic) 54.8%; ▌Edward H. Jenison (Republican) 45.2%
Illinois 22	William L. Springer	Republican	1950	Incumbent re-elected.	▌ ✓ William L. Springer (Republican) 62.0%; ▌Robert W. Martin (Democratic) 38.0%
Illinois 23	Charles W. Vursell	Republican	1942	Incumbent re-elected.	▌ ✓ Charles W. Vursell (Republican) 52.9%; ▌Albert R. Imle (Democratic) 47.1%
Illinois 24	Melvin Price	Democratic	1944	Incumbent re-elected.	▌ ✓ Melvin Price (Democratic) 69.2%; ▌John T. Thomas (Republican) 30.8%
Illinois 25	C. W. Bishop	Republican	1940	Incumbent lost re-election. Democratic gain.	▌ ✓ Kenneth J. Gray (Democratic) 52.6%; ▌C. W. Bishop (Republican) 47.4%

== Indiana ==
District	Incumbent	Party	First elected	Result	Candidates
Indiana 1	Ray Madden	Democratic	1942	Incumbent re-elected.	▌ ✓ Ray Madden (Democratic) 61.4%; ▌Robert H. Moore (Republican) 38.1%; ▌Sheridan Vale Jr. (Prohibition) 0.4%
Indiana 2	Charles A. Halleck	Republican	1935	Incumbent re-elected.	▌ ✓ Charles A. Halleck (Republican) 59.6%; ▌James H. Berg (Democratic) 40.4%
Indiana 3	Shepard Crumpacker	Republican	1950	Incumbent re-elected.	▌ ✓ Shepard Crumpacker (Republican) 50.4%; ▌John Brademas (Democratic) 49.2%; ▌Everett Mishler (Prohibition) 0.4%
Indiana 4	E. Ross Adair	Republican	1950	Incumbent re-elected.	▌ ✓ E. Ross Adair (Republican) 59.8%; ▌Fred W. Greene (Democratic) 39.6%; ▌Fred W. Knott (Prohibition) 0.6%
Indiana 5	John V. Beamer	Republican	1950	Incumbent re-elected.	▌ ✓ John V. Beamer (Republican) 53.1%; ▌John R. Walsh (Democratic) 46.2%; ▌Ralph G. Stallsmith (Prohibition) 0.6%
Indiana 6	Cecil M. Harden	Republican	1948	Incumbent re-elected.	▌ ✓ Cecil M. Harden (Republican) 52.5%; ▌John W. King (Democratic) 47.5%
Indiana 7	William G. Bray	Republican	1950	Incumbent re-elected.	▌ ✓ William G. Bray (Republican) 55.4%; ▌George G. Gettinger (Democratic) 44.4%; ▌Charlie Moore (Prohibition) 0.3%
Indiana 8	D. Bailey Merrill	Republican	1952	Incumbent lost re-election. Democratic gain.	▌ ✓ Winfield K. Denton (Democratic) 52.1%; ▌D. Bailey Merrill (Republican) 47.5%; ▌Charles W. Evans (Prohibition) 0.4%
Indiana 9	Earl Wilson	Republican	1940	Incumbent re-elected.	▌ ✓ Earl Wilson (Republican) 51.7%; ▌Wilfrid J. Ullirch (Democratic) 48.3%
Indiana 10	Ralph Harvey	Republican	1947	Incumbent re-elected.	▌ ✓ Ralph Harvey (Republican) 55.9%; ▌Inez M. Scholl (Democratic) 43.4%; ▌Lela Stubbefield (Prohibition) 0.6%
Indiana 11	Charles B. Brownson	Republican	1950	Incumbent re-elected.	▌ ✓ Charles B. Brownson (Republican) 54.9%; ▌Charles H. Boswell (Democratic) 44.8%; ▌Alston E. Wrentmore (Prohibition) 0.3%

== Iowa ==
District	Incumbent	Party	First elected	Result	Candidates
Iowa 1	Thomas E. Martin	Republican	1938	Incumbent retired to run for U.S. senator. Republican hold.	▌ ✓ Fred Schwengel (Republican) 57.0%; ▌John O'Connor (Democratic) 43.0%
Iowa 2	Henry O. Talle	Republican	1938	Incumbent re-elected.	▌ ✓ Henry O. Talle (Republican) 55.4%; ▌Ruben V. Austin (Democratic) 44.6%
Iowa 3	H. R. Gross	Republican	1948	Incumbent re-elected.	▌ ✓ H. R. Gross (Republican) 62.1%; ▌George R. Laub (Democratic) 37.9%
Iowa 4	Karl M. LeCompte	Republican	1938	Incumbent re-elected.	▌ ✓ Karl M. LeCompte (Republican) 55.6%; ▌Herschel C. Loveless (Democratic) 44.4%
Iowa 5	Paul Cunningham	Republican	1940	Incumbent re-elected.	▌ ✓ Paul Cunningham (Republican) 55.6%; ▌James A. McLaughlin (Democratic) 44.4%
Iowa 6	James I. Dolliver	Republican	1944	Incumbent re-elected.	▌ ✓ James I. Dolliver (Republican) 60.3%; ▌Lumund F. Wilcox (Democratic) 39.7%
Iowa 7	Ben F. Jensen	Republican	1938	Incumbent re-elected.	▌ ✓ Ben F. Jensen (Republican) 60.4%; ▌Elmer G. Carlson (Democratic) 39.6%
Iowa 8	Charles B. Hoeven	Republican	1942	Incumbent re-elected.	▌ ✓ Charles B. Hoeven (Republican) 63.8%; ▌Roy B. Holland (Democratic) 36.2%

== Kansas ==
District	Incumbent	Party	First elected	Result	Candidates
Kansas 1	Howard Shultz Miller	Democratic	1952	Incumbent lost re-election. Republican gain.	▌ ✓ William H. Avery (Republican) 54.3%; ▌Howard Shultz Miller (Democratic) 45.7%
Kansas 2	Errett P. Scrivner	Republican	1943	Incumbent re-elected.	▌ ✓ Errett P. Scrivner (Republican) 54.7%; ▌Newell A. George (Democratic) 45.3%
Kansas 3	Myron V. George	Republican	1950	Incumbent re-elected.	▌ ✓ Myron V. George (Republican) 55.4%; ▌William W. Monypeny (Democratic) 44.6%
Kansas 4	Edward Herbert Rees	Republican	1936	Incumbent re-elected.	▌ ✓ Edward Herbert Rees (Republican) 56.2%; ▌Robert M. Green (Democratic) 43.8%
Kansas 5	Clifford R. Hope	Republican	1926	Incumbent re-elected.	▌ ✓ Clifford R. Hope (Republican) 64.9%; ▌Robert L. Bock (Democratic) 35.1%
Kansas 6	Wint Smith	Republican	1946	Incumbent re-elected.	▌ ✓ Wint Smith (Republican) 53.3%; ▌Elmo J. Mahoney (Democratic) 46.7%

== Kentucky ==
District	Incumbent	Party	First elected	Result	Candidates
Kentucky 1	Noble Jones Gregory	Democratic	1936	Incumbent re-elected.	▌ ✓ Noble Jones Gregory (Democratic) Uncontested
Kentucky 2	William Natcher	Democratic	1953 (special)	Incumbent re-elected.	▌ ✓ William Natcher (Democratic) Uncontested
Kentucky 3	John M. Robsion Jr.	Republican	1952	Incumbent re-elected.	▌ ✓ John M. Robsion Jr. (Republican) 50.2%; ▌Harrison M. Robertson (Democratic) 49.8%
Kentucky 4	Frank Chelf	Democratic	1944	Incumbent re-elected.	▌ ✓ Frank Chelf (Democratic) Uncontested
Kentucky 5	Brent Spence	Democratic	1930	Incumbent re-elected.	▌ ✓ Brent Spence (Democratic) 61.0%; ▌M. J. See (Republican) 39.0%
Kentucky 6	John C. Watts	Democratic	1953 (special)	Incumbent re-elected.	▌ ✓ John C. Watts (Democratic) 60.9%; ▌Robert L. Milby (Republican) 39.1%
Kentucky 7	Carl D. Perkins	Democratic	1948	Incumbent re-elected.	▌ ✓ Carl D. Perkins (Democratic) 60.4%; ▌Curtis Clark (Republican) 39.6%
Kentucky 8	James S. Golden	Republican	1948	Incumbent retired. Republican hold.	▌ ✓ Eugene Siler (Republican) 63.4%; ▌Mitchel S. Fannin (Democratic) 36.3%; ▌Robert P. White (Independent) 0.3%

== Louisiana ==
District	Incumbent	Party	First elected	Result	Candidates
Louisiana 1	F. Edward Hébert	Democratic	1940	Incumbent re-elected.	▌ ✓ F. Edward Hébert (Democratic) 82.3%; ▌George W. Reese Jr. (Republican) 17.7%
Louisiana 2	Hale Boggs	Democratic	1940; 1942 (lost); 1946	Incumbent re-elected.	▌ ✓ Hale Boggs (Democratic) Uncontested
Louisiana 3	Edwin E. Willis	Democratic	1948	Incumbent re-elected.	▌ ✓ Edwin E. Willis (Democratic) Uncontested
Louisiana 4	Overton Brooks	Democratic	1936	Incumbent re-elected.	▌ ✓ Overton Brooks (Democratic) Uncontested
Louisiana 5	Otto Passman	Democratic	1946	Incumbent re-elected.	▌ ✓ Otto Passman (Democratic) Uncontested
Louisiana 6	James H. Morrison	Democratic	1942	Incumbent re-elected.	▌ ✓ James H. Morrison (Democratic) Uncontested
Louisiana 7	T. Ashton Thompson	Democratic	1952	Incumbent re-elected.	▌ ✓ T. Ashton Thompson (Democratic) Uncontested
Louisiana 8	George S. Long	Democratic	1952	Incumbent re-elected.	▌ ✓ George S. Long (Democratic) Uncontested

== Maine ==
District	Incumbent	Party	First elected	Result	Candidates
Maine 1	Robert Hale	Republican	1942	Incumbent re-elected.	▌ ✓ Robert Hale (Republican) 52.1%; ▌James C. Oliver (Democratic) 47.9%
Maine 2	Charles P. Nelson	Republican	1948	Incumbent re-elected.	▌ ✓ Charles P. Nelson (Republican) 54.0%; ▌Thomas E. Delahanty (Democratic) 46.0%
Maine 3	Clifford McIntire	Republican	1951 (special)	Incumbent re-elected.	▌ ✓ Clifford McIntire (Republican) 60.5%; ▌Kenneth B. Colbath (Democratic) 39.5%

== Maryland ==
District	Incumbent	Party	First elected	Result	Candidates
Maryland 1	Edward Tylor Miller	Republican	1946	Incumbent re-elected.	▌ ✓ Edward T. Miller (Republican) 55.5%; ▌Edward Turner (Democratic) 44.5%
Maryland 2	James Devereux	Republican	1950	Incumbent re-elected.	▌ ✓ James Devereux (Republican) 56.1%; ▌William P. Bolton (Democratic) 43.9%
Maryland 3	Edward Garmatz	Democratic	1947	Incumbent re-elected.	▌ ✓ Edward Garmatz (Democratic) 97.2%; ▌Milton Bates (Progressive) 2.8%
Maryland 4	George Hyde Fallon	Democratic	1944	Incumbent re-elected.	▌ ✓ George Hyde Fallon (Democratic) 57.2%; ▌Arthur W. Sherwood (Republican) 42.8%
Maryland 5	Frank Small Jr.	Republican	1952	Incumbent lost re-election. Democratic gain.	▌ ✓ Richard Lankford (Democratic) 53.7%; ▌Frank Small Jr. (Republican) 46.3%
Maryland 6	DeWitt Hyde	Republican	1952	Incumbent re-elected.	▌ ✓ DeWitt Hyde (Republican) 51.4%; ▌Edward J. Ryan (Democratic) 48.6%
Maryland 7	Samuel Friedel	Democratic	1952	Incumbent re-elected.	▌ ✓ Samuel Friedel (Democratic) 54.5%; ▌Edward C. Dukehart (Republican) 45.5%

== Massachusetts ==
District	Incumbent	Party	First elected	Result	Candidates
Massachusetts 1	John W. Heselton	Republican	1944	Incumbent re-elected.	▌ ✓ John W. Heselton (Republican) 55.6%; ▌John J. Dwyer (Democratic) 44.4%
Massachusetts 2	Edward Boland	Democratic	1952	Incumbent re-elected.	▌ ✓ Edward Boland (Democratic) 59.6%; ▌Vernon E. Bradley (Republican) 40.4%
Massachusetts 3	Philip J. Philbin	Democratic	1942	Incumbent re-elected.	▌ ✓ Philip J. Philbin (Democratic) Uncontested
Massachusetts 4	Harold Donohue	Democratic	1946	Incumbent re-elected.	▌ ✓ Harold Donohue (Democratic) 57.1%; ▌Andrew B. Holmstrom (Republican) 42.9%
Massachusetts 5	Edith Nourse Rogers	Republican	1925	Incumbent re-elected.	▌ ✓ Edith Nourse Rogers (Republican) Uncontested
Massachusetts 6	William H. Bates	Republican	1950	Incumbent re-elected.	▌ ✓ William H. Bates (Republican) 71.2%; ▌Andrew J. Gillis (Democratic) 28.8%
Massachusetts 7	Thomas J. Lane	Democratic	1941	Incumbent re-elected.	▌ ✓ Thomas J. Lane (Democratic) Uncontested
Massachusetts 8	Angier Goodwin	Republican	1942	Incumbent lost re-election. Democratic gain.	▌ ✓ Torbert Macdonald (Democratic) 53.2%; ▌Angier Goodwin (Republican) 46.8%
Massachusetts 9	Donald W. Nicholson	Republican	1947	Incumbent re-elected.	▌ ✓ Donald W. Nicholson (Republican) 56.7%; ▌James F. O'Neill (Democratic) 43.3%
Massachusetts 10	Laurence Curtis	Republican	1952	Incumbent re-elected.	▌ ✓ Laurence Curtis (Republican) 50.7%; ▌Jackson J. Holtz (Democratic) 49.3%
Massachusetts 11	Tip O'Neill	Democratic	1952	Incumbent re-elected.	▌ ✓ Tip O'Neill (Democratic) 78.2%; ▌Charles S. Bolster (Republican) 21.8%
Massachusetts 12	John W. McCormack	Democratic	1928	Incumbent re-elected.	▌ ✓ John W. McCormack (Democratic) Uncontested
Massachusetts 13	Richard B. Wigglesworth	Republican	1928	Incumbent re-elected.	▌ ✓ Richard B. Wigglesworth (Republican) 58.0%; ▌James F. Gardner (Democratic) 42.0%
Massachusetts 14	Joseph W. Martin Jr.	Republican	1924	Incumbent re-elected.	▌ ✓ Joseph W. Martin Jr. (Republican) 62.0%; ▌Edward F. Doolan (Democratic) 38.0%

== Michigan ==
District	Incumbent	Party	First elected	Result	Candidates
Michigan 1	Thaddeus M. Machrowicz	Democratic	1950	Incumbent re-elected.	▌ ✓ Thaddeus M. Machrowicz (Democratic) 88.3%; ▌Rudolph G. Tenerowicz (Republican) 11.3%; ▌William Sablich (Socialist Labor) 0.2%; ▌Robert Himmel Jr. (Socialist Workers) 0.1%
Michigan 2	George Meader	Republican	1950	Incumbent re-elected.	▌ ✓ George Meader (Republican) 59.8%; ▌J. Henry Owens (Democratic) 40.1%; ▌Edmund T. Taylor (Socialist Labor) 0.05%
Michigan 3	Paul W. Shafer	Republican	1936	Incumbent died August 17, 1954. Republican hold. Winner also elected to finish the current term; see above.	▌ ✓ August E. Johansen (Republican) 59.4%; ▌Charles C. Wickett (Democratic) 40.2%; ▌Clarence O. Button (Prohibition) 0.4%
Michigan 4	Clare Hoffman	Republican	1934	Incumbent re-elected.	▌ ✓ Clare Hoffman (Republican) 62.3%; ▌Gordon A. Elferdink (Democratic) 37.7%; ▌Rudolph Reidl (Socialist Labor) 0.02%
Michigan 5	Gerald Ford	Republican	1948	Incumbent re-elected.	▌ ✓ Gerald Ford (Republican) 63.3%; ▌Robert S. McAllister (Democratic) 36.7%
Michigan 6	Kit Clardy	Republican	1952	Incumbent lost re-election. Democratic gain.	▌ ✓ Donald Hayworth (Democratic) 51.1%; ▌Kit Clardy (Republican) 48.6%; ▌Egbert Street (Prohibition) 0.3%
Michigan 7	Jesse P. Wolcott	Republican	1930	Incumbent re-elected.	▌ ✓ Jesse P. Wolcott (Republican) 52.8%; ▌Ira D. McCoy (Democratic) 47.0%; ▌Clarence Dykehouse (Prohibition) 0.2%; ▌Albert Mills (Socialist Labor) 0.04%
Michigan 8	Alvin Morell Bentley	Republican	1952	Incumbent re-elected.	▌ ✓ Alvin Morell Bentley (Republican) 62.7%; ▌Clarence V. Smazel (Democratic) 37.0%; ▌D. Ruth Larson (Prohibition) 0.3%
Michigan 9	Ruth Thompson	Republican	1950	Incumbent re-elected.	▌ ✓ Ruth Thompson (Republican) 55.7%; ▌Theodore E. A. Engstrom (Democratic) 44.0%; ▌Glenn A. Root (Prohibition) 0.3%; ▌Anthony Tueling (Socialist Labor) 0.03%
Michigan 10	Elford Albin Cederberg	Republican	1952	Incumbent re-elected.	▌ ✓ Elford Albin Cederberg (Republican) 61.4%; ▌William J. Kelly (Democratic) 38.6%
Michigan 11	Victor A. Knox	Republican	1952	Incumbent re-elected.	▌ ✓ Victor A. Knox (Republican) 54.9%; ▌Harold Beaton (Democratic) 45.1%
Michigan 12	John B. Bennett	Republican	1946	Incumbent re-elected.	▌ ✓ John B. Bennett (Republican) 55.9%; ▌Frank Eugene Hook (Democratic) 44.1%
Michigan 13	George D. O'Brien	Democratic	1948	Incumbent lost renomination. Democratic hold.	▌ ✓ Charles Diggs (Democratic) 65.8%; ▌Landon Knight (Republican) 33.7%; ▌Karl V. Kurtz (Prohibition) 0.4%; ▌Peter Goonis (Socialist Labor) 0.1%
Michigan 14	Louis C. Rabaut	Democratic	1948	Incumbent re-elected.	▌ ✓ Louis C. Rabaut (Democratic) 58.2%; ▌Joseph A. Moynihan Jr. (Republican) 41.6%; ▌Herman G. Ottmer (Prohibition) 0.1%; ▌John M. Theodorou (Socialist Labor) 0.08%
Michigan 15	John Dingell Sr.	Democratic	1932	Incumbent re-elected.	▌ ✓ John Dingell Sr. (Democratic) 72.7%; ▌Gregory M. Pillon (Republican) 27.2%; ▌Joseph F. Koss (Socialist Labor) 0.1%
Michigan 16	John Lesinski Jr.	Democratic	1950	Incumbent re-elected.	▌ ✓ John Lesinski Sr. (Democratic) 67.9%; ▌Stanley A. Grendel (Republican) 31.7%; ▌Earl A. Johnson (Prohibition) 0.2%; ▌Edgar Thomas (Socialist Labor) 0.1%
Michigan 17	Charles G. Oakman	Republican	1952	Incumbent lost re-election. Democratic gain.	▌ ✓ Martha Griffiths (Democratic) 52.2%; ▌Charles G. Oakman (Republican) 47.6%; ▌Walter D. Carpenter (Prohibition) 0.2%; ▌Anthony Kimmel (Socialist Labor) 0.1%
Michigan 18	George A. Dondero	Republican	1932	Incumbent re-elected.	▌ ✓ George A. Dondero (Republican) 53.9%; ▌Paul Sutton (Democratic) 46.1%; ▌Frank Troha (Socialist Labor) 0.05%

== Minnesota ==
District	Incumbent	Party	First elected	Result	Candidates
Minnesota 1	August H. Andresen	Republican	1934	Incumbent re-elected.	▌ ✓ August H. Andresen (Republican) 60.9%; ▌Robert C. Olson (DFL) 39.1%
Minnesota 2	Joseph P. O'Hara	Republican	1940	Incumbent re-elected.	▌ ✓ Joseph P. O'Hara (Republican) 57.9%; ▌Harry Sieben Sr.(DFL) 42.1%
Minnesota 3	Roy Wier	Democratic (DFL)	1948	Incumbent re-elected.	▌ ✓ Roy Wier (DFL) 54.4%; ▌Ed Willow (Republican) 45.6%
Minnesota 4	Eugene McCarthy	Democratic (DFL)	1948	Incumbent re-elected.	▌ ✓ Eugene McCarthy (DFL) 63.0%; ▌Richard C. Hansen (Republican) 37.0%
Minnesota 5	Walter Judd	Republican	1942	Incumbent re-elected.	▌ ✓ Walter Judd (Republican) 55.8%; ▌Anders Thompson (DFL) 44.2%
Minnesota 6	Fred Marshall	Democratic (DFL)	1948	Incumbent re-elected.	▌ ✓ Fred Marshall (DFL) 61.9%; ▌Oscar J. Jerde (Republican) 38.1%
Minnesota 7	H. Carl Andersen	Republican	1938	Incumbent re-elected.	▌ ✓ H. Carl Andersen (Republican) 52.6%; ▌Douglas P. Hunt (DFL) 47.4%
Minnesota 8	John Blatnik	Democratic (DFL)	1946	Incumbent re-elected.	▌ ✓ John Blatnik (DFL) 71.8%; ▌Ernest R. Orchard (Republican) 28.2%
Minnesota 9	Harold Hagen	Republican	1944	Incumbent lost re-election. Democratic (DFL) gain.	▌ ✓ Coya Knutson (DFL) 51.2%; ▌Harold Hagen (Republican) 48.8%

== Mississippi ==
District	Incumbent	Party	First elected	Result	Candidates
Mississippi 1	Thomas Abernethy	Democratic	1942	Incumbent re-elected.	▌ ✓ Thomas Abernethy (Democratic) Uncontested
Mississippi 2	Jamie Whitten	Democratic	1941	Incumbent re-elected.	▌ ✓ Jamie Whitten (Democratic) Uncontested
Mississippi 3	Frank E. Smith	Democratic	1950	Incumbent re-elected.	▌ ✓ Frank E. Smith (Democratic) Uncontested
Mississippi 4	John Bell Williams	Democratic	1946	Incumbent re-elected.	▌ ✓ John Bell Williams (Democratic) Uncontested
Mississippi 5	W. Arthur Winstead	Democratic	1942	Incumbent re-elected.	▌ ✓ W. Arthur Winstead (Democratic) Uncontested
Mississippi 6	William M. Colmer	Democratic	1932	Incumbent re-elected.	▌ ✓ William M. Colmer (Democratic) Uncontested

== Missouri ==
District	Incumbent	Party	First elected	Result	Candidates
Missouri 1	Frank M. Karsten	Democratic	1946	Incumbent re-elected.	▌ ✓ Frank M. Karsten (Democratic) 66.3%; ▌Bill Bangert (Republican) 33.7%
Missouri 2	Thomas B. Curtis	Republican	1950	Incumbent re-elected.	▌ ✓ Thomas B. Curtis (Republican) 54.7%; ▌Eugene H. Buder (Democratic) 45.3%
Missouri 3	Leonor Sullivan	Democratic	1952	Incumbent re-elected.	▌ ✓ Leonor Sullivan (Democratic) 71.0%; ▌George W. Curran (Republican) 29.0%
Missouri 4	Jeffrey P. Hillelson	Republican	1952	Incumbent lost re-election. Democratic gain.	▌ ✓ George H. Christopher (Democratic) 51.6%; ▌Jeffrey P. Hillelson (Republican) 48.4%
Missouri 5	Richard Bolling	Democratic	1948	Incumbent re-elected.	▌ ✓ Richard Bolling (Democratic) 58.9%; ▌Samuel Lee Chaney (Republican) 41.1%
Missouri 6	William C. Cole	Republican	1952	Incumbent lost re-election. Democratic gain.	▌ ✓ William Raleigh Hull Jr. (Democratic) 53.6%; ▌William C. Cole (Republican) 46.4%
Missouri 7	Dewey Short	Republican	1934	Incumbent re-elected.	▌ ✓ Dewey Short (Republican) 53.6%; ▌J. M. Lowry (Democratic) 46.4%
Missouri 8	A. S. J. Carnahan	Democratic	1948	Incumbent re-elected.	▌ ✓ A. S. J. Carnahan (Democratic) 57.2%; ▌Dorman L. Steelman (Republican) 42.8%
Missouri 9	Clarence Cannon	Democratic	1922	Incumbent re-elected.	▌ ✓ Clarence Cannon (Democratic) 59.0%; ▌Noel Carpenter (Republican) 41.0%
Missouri 10	Paul C. Jones	Democratic	1948	Incumbent re-elected.	▌ ✓ Paul C. Jones (Democratic) 63.9%; ▌Clyde Whaley (Republican) 36.1%
Missouri 11	Morgan M. Moulder	Democratic	1948	Incumbent re-elected.	▌ ✓ Morgan M. Moulder (Democratic) 55.3%; ▌L. C. Davis (Republican) 44.7%

== Montana ==
District	Incumbent	Party	First elected	Result	Candidates
Montana 1	Lee Metcalf	Democratic	1952	Incumbent re-elected.	▌ ✓ Lee Metcalf (Democratic) 56.0%; ▌Winfield E. Page (Republican) 44.0%
Montana 2	Wesley A. D'Ewart	Republican	1945 (special)	Incumbent retired to run for U.S. Senator. Republican hold.	▌ ✓ Orvin B. Fjare (Republican) 50.6%; ▌LeRoy H. Anderson (Democratic) 49.4%

== Nebraska ==
District	Incumbent	Party	First elected	Result	Candidates
Nebraska 1	Carl Curtis	Republican	1938	Incumbent retired to run for U.S. senator. Republican hold.	▌ ✓ Phillip Hart Weaver (Republican) 58.6%; ▌Frank B. Morrison (Democratic) 41.4%
Nebraska 2	Roman Hruska	Republican	1952	Incumbent retired to run for U.S. senator. Republican hold.	▌ ✓ Jackson B. Chase (Republican) 52.9%; ▌James A. Hart (Democratic) 47.1%
Nebraska 3	Robert Dinsmore Harrison	Republican	1951	Incumbent re-elected.	▌ ✓ Robert Dinsmore Harrison (Republican) 65.2%; ▌Ernest M. Luther (Democratic) 34.8%
Nebraska 4	Arthur L. Miller	Republican	1942	Incumbent re-elected.	▌ ✓ Arthur L. Miller (Republican) 70.4%; ▌Carlton W. Laird (Democratic) 29.6%

== Nevada ==
District	Incumbent	Party	First elected	Result	Candidates
Nevada at-large	C. Clifton Young	Republican	1952	Incumbent re-elected.	▌ ✓ C. Clifton Young (Republican) 54.5%; ▌Walter S. Baring Jr. (Democratic) 45.5%

== New Hampshire ==
District	Incumbent	Party	First elected	Result	Candidates
New Hampshire 1	Chester Earl Merrow	Republican	1942	Incumbent re-elected.	▌ ✓ Chester Earl Merrow (Republican) 50.2%; ▌Thomas J. McIntyre (Democratic) 49.8%
New Hampshire 2	Norris Cotton	Republican	1946	Incumbent retired to run for U.S. Senator. Republican hold.	▌ ✓ Perkins Bass (Republican) 60.4%; ▌George F. Brown (Democratic) 39.6%

== New Jersey ==
District	Incumbent	Party	First elected	Result	Candidates
New Jersey 1	Charles A. Wolverton	Republican	1926	Incumbent re-elected.	▌ ✓ Charles A. Wolverton (Republican) 54.3%; ▌J. Frank Crawford (Democratic) 45.5%; ▌Jules Levin (Socialist Labor) 0.1%
New Jersey 2	T. Millet Hand	Republican	1944	Incumbent re-elected.	▌ ✓ T. Millet Hand (Republican) 63.6%; ▌Clayton E. Burdick (Democratic) 36.4%; ▌Morris Karp (Socialist Labor) 0.05%
New Jersey 3	James C. Auchincloss	Republican	1942	Incumbent re-elected.	▌ ✓ James C. Auchincloss (Republican) 57.6%; ▌Charles F. Sullivan (Democratic) 42.4%
New Jersey 4	Charles R. Howell	Democratic	1948	Incumbent retired to run for U.S. Senator. Democratic hold.	▌ ✓ Frank Thompson (Democratic) 58.4%; ▌William G. Freeman (Republican) 41.6%
New Jersey 5	Peter Frelinghuysen Jr.	Republican	1952	Incumbent re-elected.	▌ ✓ Peter Frelinghuysen Jr. (Republican) 59.3%; ▌Luther H. Martin (Democratic) 40.7%
New Jersey 6	Harrison A. Williams	Democratic	1953	Incumbent re-elected.	▌ ✓ Harrison A. Williams (Democratic) 56.1%; ▌Fred E. Shepard (Republican) 41.9%; ▌Harry Mopsick (Independent) 2.0%
New Jersey 7	William B. Widnall	Republican	1950	Incumbent re-elected.	▌ ✓ William B. Widnall (Republican) 62.2%; ▌Eugene E. Demarest (Democratic) 37.8%
New Jersey 8	Gordon Canfield	Republican	1940	Incumbent re-elected.	▌ ✓ Gordon Canfield (Republican) 54.8%; ▌Charles S. Joelson (Democratic) 45.1%; ▌Harry Santhouse (Socialist Labor) 0.1%
New Jersey 9	Frank C. Osmers Jr.	Republican	1951	Incumbent re-elected.	▌ ✓ Frank C. Osmers Jr. (Republican) 60.2%; ▌Walter J. O'Connell (Democratic) 39.8%
New Jersey 10	Peter W. Rodino	Democratic	1948	Incumbent re-elected.	▌ ✓ Peter W. Rodino (Democratic) 63.4%; ▌William E. McGlynn (Republican) 36.6%
New Jersey 11	Hugh J. Addonizio	Democratic	1948	Incumbent re-elected.	▌ ✓ Hugh J. Addonizio (Democratic) 56.3%; ▌Philip Insabella (Republican) 41.2%; ▌William H. Smullen (Independent) 2.5%
New Jersey 12	Robert Kean	Republican	1938	Incumbent re-elected.	▌ ✓ Robert Kean (Republican) 53.1%; ▌Martin S. Fox (Democratic) 46.9%
New Jersey 13	Alfred Sieminski	Democratic	1950	Incumbent re-elected.	▌ ✓ Alfred Sieminski (Democratic) 60.8%; ▌Norman H. Roth (Republican) 26.9%; ▌Jeremiah J. O'Callaghan (Independent) 12.3%
New Jersey 14	Edward J. Hart	Democratic	1934	Incumbent retired. Democratic hold.	▌ ✓ T. James Tumulty (Democratic) 62.4%; ▌Vincent J. Dellay (Republican) 34.9%; ▌James F. McGovern (Independent) 1.4%; ▌Charles Gumino (Independent) 1.3%

== New Mexico ==
District	Incumbent	Party	First elected	Result	Candidates
New Mexico at-large	John J. Dempsey	Democratic	1950	Incumbent re-elected.	▌ ✓ John J. Dempsey (Democratic) 29.8%; ▌ ✓ Antonio M. Fernández (Democratic) 29.3%; ▌Thomas H. Childers (Republican) 20.6%; ▌Warren R. Cobean (Republican) 20.4%
New Mexico at-large	Antonio M. Fernández	Democratic	1942	Incumbent re-elected.	▌ ✓ John J. Dempsey (Democratic) 29.8%; ▌ ✓ Antonio M. Fernández (Democratic) 29.3%; ▌Thomas H. Childers (Republican) 20.6%; ▌Warren R. Cobean (Republican) 20.4%

== New York ==
District	Incumbent	Party	First elected	Result	Candidates
New York 1	Stuyvesant Wainwright	Republican	1952	Incumbent re-elected.	▌ ✓ Stuyvesant Wainwright (Republican) 63.1%; ▌Ernest Greenwood (Democratic) 36.7%; ▌Karen Hess (American Labor) 0.2%
New York 2	Steven Derounian	Republican	1952	Incumbent re-elected.	▌ ✓ Steven Derounian (Republican) 63.7%; ▌William R. Brennan Jr. (Democratic) 35.8%; ▌Henry Dolimer (American Labor) 0.5%
New York 3	Frank J. Becker	Republican	1952	Incumbent re-elected.	▌ ✓ Frank J. Becker (Republican) 58.3%; ▌John Cogley (Democratic) 41.7%
New York 4	Henry J. Latham	Republican	1944	Incumbent re-elected.	▌ ✓ Henry J. Latham (Republican) 54.2%; ▌Thomas A. Dent (Democratic) 40.3%; ▌Robert A. Rose (Liberal) 5.5%
New York 5	Albert H. Bosch	Republican	1952	Incumbent re-elected.	▌ ✓ Albert H. Bosch (Republican) 51.7%; ▌William Kerwick (Democratic) 43.9%; ▌Leo Brown (Liberal) 3.9%; ▌Donald M. Long (American Labor) 0.6%
New York 6	Lester Holtzman	Democratic	1952	Incumbent re-elected.	▌ ✓ Lester Holtzman (Democratic) 54.5%; ▌Seymour Halpern (Republican) 45.5%
New York 7	James J. Delaney	Democratic	1944; 1946 (lost); 1948	Incumbent re-elected.	▌ ✓ James J. Delaney (Democratic) 59.0%; ▌Joseph Stockinger (Republican) 41.0%
New York 8	Louis B. Heller	Democratic	1949	Incumbent resigned July 21, 1954 to become a NYC Special Sessions Court judge. Democratic hold.	▌ ✓ Victor Anfuso (Democratic) 77.7%; ▌Eugene J. Renne (Republican) 22.3%
New York 9	Eugene James Keogh	Democratic	1936	Incumbent re-elected.	▌ ✓ Eugene James Keogh (Democratic) 71.1%; ▌Harry Keller (Republican) 27.3%; ▌Adolph Albert (American Labor) 1.6%
New York 10	Edna F. Kelly	Democratic	1949	Incumbent re-elected.	▌ ✓ Edna F. Kelly (Democratic) 76.8%; ▌Abraham Sher (Republican) 21.4%; ▌Oliver Leeds (American Labor) 1.8%
New York 11	Emanuel Celler	Democratic	1922	Incumbent re-elected.	▌ ✓ Emanuel Celler (Democratic) 83.5%; ▌Henry D. Dorfman (Republican) 16.5%
New York 12	Francis E. Dorn	Republican	1952	Incumbent re-elected.	▌ ✓ Francis E. Dorn (Republican) 51.3%; ▌Donald L. O'Toole (Democratic) 48.7%
New York 13	Abraham J. Multer	Democratic	1947	Incumbent re-elected.	▌ ✓ Abraham J. Multer (Democratic) 78.8%; ▌Joseph Moriber (Republican) 19.2%; ▌Saul Rudes (American Labor) 2.0%
New York 14	John J. Rooney	Democratic	1944	Incumbent re-elected.	▌ ✓ John J. Rooney (Democratic) 73.1%; ▌Alfred A. Manti (Republican) 25.5%; ▌Blanche K. Katz (American Labor) 1.3%
New York 15	John H. Ray	Republican	1952	Incumbent re-elected.	▌ ✓ John H. Ray (Republican) 51.6%; ▌Vincent R. Fitzpatrick (Democratic) 48.1%; ▌Jean Militean (American Labor) 0.3%
New York 16	Adam Clayton Powell Jr.	Democratic	1944	Incumbent re-elected.	▌ ✓ Adam Clayton Powell Jr. (Democratic) 77.6%; ▌Harold C. Burton (Republican) 15.9%; ▌Formington Taylor (Liberal) 6.6%
New York 17	Frederic René Coudert Jr.	Republican	1946	Incumbent re-elected.	▌ ✓ Frederic René Coudert Jr. (Republican) 50.2%; ▌Anthony B. Akers (Democratic) 49.8%
New York 18	James G. Donovan	Democratic	1950	Incumbent re-elected.	▌ ✓ James G. Donovan (Democratic) 86.8%; ▌Amos Basel (Liberal) 10.8%; ▌Frank Wedl (American Labor) 2.3%
New York 19	Arthur G. Klein	Democratic	1946	Incumbent re-elected.	▌ ✓ Arthur G. Klein (Democratic) 74.6%; ▌Henry E. Del Rosso (Republican) 25.4%
New York 20	Franklin D. Roosevelt Jr.	Democratic	1949	Incumbent retired to run for Attorney General of New York. Democratic hold.	▌ ✓ Irwin D. Davidson (Democratic) 67.2%; ▌Warren L. Schnur (Republican) 30.7%; ▌Morris Goldin (American Labor) 2.1%
New York 21	Jacob Javits	Republican	1946	Incumbent retired to run for Attorney General of New York. Democratic gain.	▌ ✓ Herbert Zelenko (Democratic) 67.8%; ▌Floyd Cramer (Republican) 32.2%
New York 22	Sidney A. Fine	Democratic	1950	Incumbent re-elected.	▌ ✓ Sidney A. Fine (Democratic) 67.8%; ▌Henry Rose (Republican) 17.8%; ▌Louis Schifrin (Liberal) 12.5%; ▌Anita Friedlander (American Labor) 1.9%
New York 23	Isidore Dollinger	Democratic	1948	Incumbent re-elected.	▌ ✓ Isidore Dollinger (Democratic) 75.6%; ▌Philip Myer (Republican) 12.9%; ▌Bernice Benedick (Liberal) 11.5%
New York 24	Charles A. Buckley	Democratic	1934	Incumbent re-elected.	▌ ✓ Charles A. Buckley (Democratic) 57.6%; ▌Charles V. Scanlan (Republican) 26.2%; ▌Elias Rosenblatt (Liberal) 15.0%; ▌Elizabeth Gurley Flynn (Peoples Rights) 1.2%
New York 25	Paul A. Fino	Republican	1952	Incumbent re-elected.	▌ ✓ Paul A. Fino (Republican) 50.4%; ▌Salvatore J. Milano (Democratic) 43.1%; ▌Ernest Doerfler (Liberal) 6.5%
New York 26	Ralph A. Gamble	Republican	1937	Incumbent re-elected.	▌ ✓ Ralph A. Gamble (Republican) 64.0%; ▌Julia L. Crews (Democratic) 36.0%
New York 27	Ralph W. Gwinn	Republican	1944	Incumbent re-elected.	▌ ✓ Ralph W. Gwinn (Republican) 57.2%; ▌John R. Harold (Democratic) 42.8%
New York 28	Katharine St. George	Republican	1946	Incumbent re-elected.	▌ ✓ Katharine St. George (Republican) 64.9%; ▌Paul G. Reilly (Democratic) 32.7%; ▌Harold Gold (Liberal) 2.3%
New York 29	J. Ernest Wharton	Republican	1950	Incumbent re-elected.	▌ ✓ J. Ernest Wharton (Republican) 66.5%; ▌Robert D. Byron (Democratic) 31.7%; ▌Mabel Chapman (Liberal) 1.7%
New York 30	Leo W. O'Brien	Democratic	1952	Incumbent re-elected.	▌ ✓ Leo W. O'Brien (Democratic) 61.2%; ▌James W. Smith (Republican) 38.8%
New York 31	Dean P. Taylor	Republican	1942	Incumbent re-elected.	▌ ✓ Dean P. Taylor (Republican) 66.2%; ▌Joseph R. MacLaren (Democratic) 33.8%
New York 32	Bernard W. Kearney	Republican	1942	Incumbent re-elected.	▌ ✓ Bernard W. Kearney (Republican) 61.5%; ▌David C. Prince (Democratic) 38.5%
New York 33	Clarence E. Kilburn	Republican	1940	Incumbent re-elected.	▌ ✓ Clarence E. Kilburn (Republican) 68.1%; ▌Harold Blake (Democratic) 30.1%; ▌William J. Delo Jr. (Liberal) 1.8%
New York 34	William R. Williams	Republican	1950	Incumbent re-elected.	▌ ✓ William R. Williams (Republican) 59.3%; ▌Vernon E. Olin (Democratic) 40.6%; ▌Marcia Daz Butler (American Labor) 0.1%
New York 35	R. Walter Riehlman	Republican	1946	Incumbent re-elected.	▌ ✓ R. Walter Riehlman (Republican) 63.1%; ▌James H. O'Connor (Democratic) 36.7%; ▌Lillian E. Reiner (American Labor) 0.2%
New York 36	John Taber	Republican	1922	Incumbent re-elected.	▌ ✓ John Taber (Republican) 68.4%; ▌Daniel J. Carey (Democratic) 31.6%
New York 37	W. Sterling Cole	Republican	1934	Incumbent re-elected.	▌ ✓ W. Sterling Cole (Republican) 71.7%; ▌John E. Bloomer (Democratic) 28.3%
New York 38	Kenneth Keating	Republican	1946	Incumbent re-elected.	▌ ✓ Kenneth Keating (Republican) 71.9%; ▌Rubin Brodsky (Democratic) 28.1%
New York 39	Harold C. Ostertag	Republican	1950	Incumbent re-elected.	▌ ✓ Harold C. Ostertag (Republican) 64.8%; ▌George W. Cooke (Democratic) 35.2%
New York 40	William E. Miller	Republican	1950	Incumbent re-elected.	▌ ✓ William E. Miller (Republican) 60.9%; ▌Mariano A. Lucca (Democratic) 37.1%; ▌Louis Longo (Liberal) 1.8%; ▌Nick Curtis (American Labor) 0.2%
New York 41	Edmund P. Radwan	Republican	1950	Incumbent re-elected.	▌ ✓ Edmund P. Radwan (Republican) 63.1%; ▌Bernard J. Wojtkowiak (Democratic) 36.9%
New York 42	John R. Pillion	Republican	1952	Incumbent re-elected.	▌ ✓ John R. Pillion (Republican) 57.6%; ▌John J. Zablotny (Democratic) 42.4%
New York 43	Daniel A. Reed	Republican	1918	Incumbent re-elected.	▌ ✓ Daniel A. Reed (Republican) 64.8%; ▌James F. Crowley (Democratic) 33.5%; ▌John G. Cooper (Liberal) 1.6%; ▌Nahum E. Aldrich (American Labor) 0.07%

== North Carolina ==
District	Incumbent	Party	First elected	Result	Candidates
North Carolina 1	Herbert Covington Bonner	Democratic	1940	Incumbent re-elected.	▌ ✓ Herbert Covington Bonner (Democratic) 92.5%; ▌W. T. Love (Republican) 7.5%
North Carolina 2	Lawrence H. Fountain	Democratic	1952	Incumbent re-elected.	▌ ✓ Lawrence H. Fountain (Democratic) Uncontested
North Carolina 3	Graham Arthur Barden	Democratic	1934	Incumbent re-elected.	▌ ✓ Graham Arthur Barden (Democratic) 77.3%; ▌Christine P. Odom (Republican) 22.7%
North Carolina 4	Harold D. Cooley	Democratic	1934	Incumbent re-elected.	▌ ✓ Harold D. Cooley (Democratic) Uncontested
North Carolina 5	R. Thurmond Chatham	Democratic	1948	Incumbent re-elected.	▌ ✓ R. Thurmond Chatham (Democratic) 66.2%; ▌Joe New (Republican) 33.8%
North Carolina 6	Carl T. Durham	Democratic	1938	Incumbent re-elected.	▌ ✓ Carl T. Durham (Democratic) 74.2%; ▌Rufus K. Hayworth Jr. (Republican) 25.8%
North Carolina 7	Frank Ertel Carlyle	Democratic	1948	Incumbent re-elected.	▌ ✓ Frank Ertel Carlyle (Democratic) 81.2%; ▌J. O. West (Republican) 18.8%
North Carolina 8	Charles B. Deane	Democratic	1946	Incumbent re-elected.	▌ ✓ Charles B. Deane (Democratic) 59.1%; ▌Harold W. Gavin (Republican) 40.9%
North Carolina 9	Hugh Quincy Alexander	Democratic	1952	Incumbent re-elected.	▌ ✓ Hugh Quincy Alexander (Democratic) 52.2%; ▌William E. Stevens Jr. (Republican) 47.8%
North Carolina 10	Charles R. Jonas	Republican	1952	Incumbent re-elected.	▌ ✓ Charles R. Jonas (Republican) 57.5%; ▌J. C. Sedberry (Democratic) 42.5%
North Carolina 11	Woodrow W. Jones	Democratic	1950	Incumbent re-elected.	▌ ✓ Woodrow W. Jones (Democratic) 67.5%; ▌R. R. Ramsey (Republican) 32.5%
North Carolina 12	George A. Shuford	Democratic	1952	Incumbent re-elected.	▌ ✓ George A. Shuford (Democratic) 61.5%; ▌Charles W. Cunningham (Republican) 38.5%

== North Dakota ==
District	Incumbent	Party	First elected	Result	Candidates
North Dakota at-large	Usher L. Burdick	Republican-NPL	1948	Incumbent re-elected.	▌ ✓ Usher L. Burdick (Republican-NPL) 36.2%; ▌ ✓ Otto Krueger (Republican) 30.9%; ▌P. W. Lanier (Democratic) 18.6%; ▌Raymond G. Vendsel (Democratic) 14.3%
North Dakota at-large	Otto Krueger	Republican	1952	Incumbent re-elected.	▌ ✓ Usher L. Burdick (Republican-NPL) 36.2%; ▌ ✓ Otto Krueger (Republican) 30.9%; ▌P. W. Lanier (Democratic) 18.6%; ▌Raymond G. Vendsel (Democratic) 14.3%

== Ohio ==
District	Incumbent	Party	First elected	Result	Candidates
Ohio 1	Gordon H. Scherer	Republican	1952	Incumbent re-elected.	▌ ✓ Gordon H. Scherer (Republican) 64.3%; ▌Mrs. Warwick B. Hobart (Democratic) 35.7%
Ohio 2	William E. Hess	Republican	1950	Incumbent re-elected.	▌ ✓ William E. Hess (Republican) 58.4%; ▌Earl T. Wagner (Democratic) 41.6%
Ohio 3	Paul F. Schenck	Republican	1951	Incumbent re-elected.	▌ ✓ Paul F. Schenck (Republican) 52.6%; ▌Thomas B. Talbot (Democratic) 47.4%
Ohio 4	William Moore McCulloch	Republican	1947	Incumbent re-elected.	▌ ✓ William Moore McCulloch (Republican) 67.6%; ▌Forrest L. Blankenship (Democratic) 32.4%
Ohio 5	Cliff Clevenger	Republican	1938	Incumbent re-elected.	▌ ✓ Cliff Clevenger (Republican) 59.5%; ▌Martin W. Feigert (Democratic) 40.5%
Ohio 6	James G. Polk	Democratic	1948	Incumbent re-elected.	▌ ✓ James G. Polk (Democratic) 52.2%; ▌Leo Blackburn (Republican) 47.8%
Ohio 7	Clarence J. Brown	Republican	1938	Incumbent re-elected.	▌ ✓ Clarence J. Brown (Republican) 63.9%; ▌G. Louis Wren (Democratic) 36.1%
Ohio 8	Jackson Edward Betts	Republican	1950	Incumbent re-elected.	▌ ✓ Jackson Edward Betts (Republican) 63.0%; ▌Thomas M. Dowd (Democratic) 37.0%
Ohio 9	Frazier Reams	Independent	1950	Incumbent lost re-election. Democratic gain.	▌ ✓ Thomas L. Ashley (Democratic) 36.4%; ▌Frazier Reams (Independent) 33.6%; ▌Irving C. Reynolds (Republican) 30.0%
Ohio 10	Thomas A. Jenkins	Republican	1924	Incumbent re-elected.	▌ ✓ Thomas A. Jenkins (Republican) 61.7%; ▌Truman A. Morris (Democratic) 38.3%
Ohio 11	Oliver P. Bolton	Republican	1952	Incumbent re-elected.	▌ ✓ Oliver P. Bolton (Republican) 65.3%; ▌Edward C. Kaley (Democratic) 34.7%
Ohio 12	John M. Vorys	Republican	1938	Incumbent re-elected.	▌ ✓ John M. Vorys (Republican) 61.5%; ▌Jacob F. Myers (Democratic) 38.5%
Ohio 13	Alvin F. Weichel	Republican	1942	Incumbent retired. Republican hold.	▌ ✓ A. David Baumhart Jr. (Republican) 59.1%; ▌George C. Steinemann (Democratic) 40.9%
Ohio 14	William H. Ayres	Republican	1950	Incumbent re-elected.	▌ ✓ William H. Ayres (Republican) 54.6%; ▌John L. Smith (Democratic) 45.4%
Ohio 15	Robert T. Secrest	Democratic	1948	Incumbent resigned September 26, 1954 to join the FTC. Republican gain.	▌ ✓ John E. Henderson (Republican) 54.0%; ▌Max L. Underwood (Democratic) 46.0%
Ohio 16	Frank T. Bow	Republican	1950	Incumbent re-elected.	▌ ✓ Frank T. Bow (Republican) 58.3%; ▌Thomas H. Nichols (Democratic) 41.7%
Ohio 17	J. Harry McGregor	Republican	1940	Incumbent re-elected.	▌ ✓ J. Harry McGregor (Republican) 64.6%; ▌Robert W. Levering (Democratic) 35.4%
Ohio 18	Wayne Hays	Democratic	1948	Incumbent re-elected.	▌ ✓ Wayne Hays (Democratic) 57.3%; ▌Walter J. Hunston (Republican) 42.7%
Ohio 19	Michael J. Kirwan	Democratic	1936	Incumbent re-elected.	▌ ✓ Michael J. Kirwan (Democratic) 67.5%; ▌David S. Edwards (Republican) 32.5%
Ohio 20	Michael A. Feighan	Democratic	1942	Incumbent re-elected.	▌ ✓ Michael A. Feighan (Democratic) 67.7%; ▌John H. Ferguson (Republican) 32.3%
Ohio 21	Robert Crosser	Democratic	1922	Incumbent lost renomination. Democratic hold.	▌ ✓ Charles Vanik (Democratic) 76.0%; ▌Francis E. Young (Republican) 24.0%
Ohio 22	Frances P. Bolton	Republican	1940	Incumbent re-elected.	▌ ✓ Frances P. Bolton (Republican) 58.3%; ▌Chat Paterson (Democratic) 41.7%
Ohio 23	George H. Bender	Republican	1950	Incumbent retired to run for U.S. senator. Republican hold.	▌ ✓ William Edwin Minshall Jr. (Republican) 67.5%; ▌Bernice S. Pyke (Democratic) 32.5%

== Oklahoma ==
District	Incumbent	Party	First elected	Result	Candidates
Oklahoma 1	Page Belcher	Republican	1950	Incumbent re-elected.	▌ ✓ Page Belcher (Republican) 58.8%; ▌Ben Crowley (Democratic) 41.2%
Oklahoma 2	Ed Edmondson	Democratic	1952	Incumbent re-elected.	▌ ✓ Ed Edmondson (Democratic) 64.7%; ▌Percy Butler (Republican) 35.3%
Oklahoma 3	Carl Albert	Democratic	1946	Incumbent re-elected.	▌ ✓ Carl Albert (Democratic) 83.3%; ▌Jasper N. Butler (Republican) 16.7%
Oklahoma 4	Tom Steed	Democratic	1948	Incumbent re-elected.	▌ ✓ Tom Steed (Democratic) Uncontested
Oklahoma 5	John Jarman	Democratic	1950	Incumbent re-elected.	▌ ✓ John Jarman (Democratic) 66.0%; ▌George E. Young (Republican) 34.0%
Oklahoma 6	Victor Wickersham	Democratic	1948	Incumbent re-elected.	▌ ✓ Victor Wickersham (Democratic) 69.3%; ▌Reece L. Russell (Republican) 30.7%

== Oregon ==
District	Incumbent	Party	First elected	Result	Candidates
Oregon 1	A. Walter Norblad	Republican	1946	Incumbent re-elected.	▌ ✓ A. Walter Norblad (Republican) 63.0%; ▌Donnell Mitchell (Democratic) 37.0%
Oregon 2	Sam Coon	Republican	1952	Incumbent re-elected.	▌ ✓ Sam Coon (Republican) 52.6%; ▌Al Ullman (Democratic) 47.4%
Oregon 3	Homer D. Angell	Republican	1938	Incumbent lost renomination. Democratic gain.	▌ ✓ Edith Green (Democratic) 52.4%; ▌Tom McCall (Republican) 47.6%
Oregon 4	Harris Ellsworth	Republican	1942	Incumbent re-elected.	▌ ✓ Harris Ellsworth (Republican) 55.9%; ▌Charles O. Porter (Democratic) 44.1%

== Pennsylvania ==
District	Incumbent	Party	First elected	Result	Candidates
Pennsylvania 1	William A. Barrett	Democratic	1944; 1946 (defeated); 1948	Incumbent re-elected.	▌ ✓ William A. Barrett (Democratic) 61.5%; ▌Joseph A. Graham Jr. (Republican) 38.5%
Pennsylvania 2	William T. Granahan	Democratic	1948	Incumbent re-elected.	▌ ✓ William T. Granahan (Democratic) 61.2%; ▌Albert A. Ciardi (Republican) 38.8%
Pennsylvania 3	James A. Byrne	Democratic	1952	Incumbent re-elected.	▌ ✓ James A. Byrne (Democratic) 55.4%; ▌Charles H. Sporkin (Republican) 44.6%
Pennsylvania 4	Earl Chudoff	Democratic	1948	Incumbent re-elected.	▌ ✓ Earl Chudoff (Democratic) 65.7%; ▌W. Beverly Carter Jr. (Republican) 34.2%; ▌Robert Chester (Militant Workers) 0.1%
Pennsylvania 5	William J. Green Jr.	Democratic	1948	Incumbent re-elected.	▌ ✓ William J. Green Jr. (Democratic) 55.0%; ▌Francis P. McCusker (Republican) 45.0%
Pennsylvania 6	Hugh Scott	Republican	1946	Incumbent re-elected.	▌ ✓ Hugh Scott (Republican) 50.6%; ▌Alexander Hemphill (Democratic) 49.4%
Pennsylvania 7	Benjamin F. James	Republican	1948	Incumbent re-elected.	▌ ✓ Benjamin F. James (Republican) 60.9%; ▌O. Arthur Cappiello (Democratic) 39.1%
Pennsylvania 8	Karl C. King	Republican	1951	Incumbent re-elected.	▌ ✓ Karl C. King (Republican) 51.2%; ▌John P. Fullam (Democratic) 48.8%
Pennsylvania 9	Paul B. Dague	Republican	1946	Incumbent re-elected.	▌ ✓ Paul B. Dague (Republican) 62.7%; ▌Edward G. Wilson (Democratic) 37.3%
Pennsylvania 10	Joseph L. Carrigg	Republican	1951	Incumbent re-elected.	▌ ✓ Joseph L. Carrigg (Republican) 50.5%; ▌Robert H. Jones (Democratic) 49.5%
Pennsylvania 11	Edward Bonin	Republican	1952	Incumbent lost re-election. Democratic gain.	▌ ✓ Daniel Flood (Democratic) 50.9%; ▌Edward Bonin (Republican) 49.1%
Pennsylvania 12	Ivor D. Fenton	Republican	1938	Incumbent re-elected.	▌ ✓ Ivor D. Fenton (Republican) 55.5%; ▌Charles E. Lotz (Democratic) 44.5%
Pennsylvania 13	Samuel K. McConnell Jr.	Republican	1944	Incumbent re-elected.	▌ ✓ Samuel K. McConnell Jr. (Republican) 64.3%; ▌Joseph C. Mansfield (Democratic) 35.7%
Pennsylvania 14	George M. Rhodes	Democratic	1948	Incumbent re-elected.	▌ ✓ George M. Rhodes (Democratic) 62.0%; ▌Donald F. Spang (Republican) 38.0%
Pennsylvania 15	Francis E. Walter	Democratic	1932	Incumbent re-elected.	▌ ✓ Francis E. Walter (Democratic) 61.6%; ▌LeRoy Mikels (Republican) 38.4%
Pennsylvania 16	Walter M. Mumma	Republican	1950	Incumbent re-elected.	▌ ✓ Walter M. Mumma (Republican) 59.8%; ▌Richard A. Swank (Democratic) 40.2%
Pennsylvania 17	Alvin Bush	Republican	1950	Incumbent re-elected.	▌ ✓ Alvin Bush (Republican) 56.5%; ▌William T. Longe (Democratic) 43.5%
Pennsylvania 18	Richard M. Simpson	Republican	1937	Incumbent re-elected.	▌ ✓ Richard M. Simpson (Republican) 55.9%; ▌Robert M. Meyers (Democratic) 44.1%
Pennsylvania 19	S. Walter Stauffer	Republican	1952	Incumbent lost re-election. Democratic gain.	▌ ✓ James M. Quigley (Democratic) 51.0%; ▌S. Walter Stauffer (Republican) 49.0%
Pennsylvania 20	James E. Van Zandt	Republican	1946	Incumbent re-elected.	▌ ✓ James E. Van Zandt (Republican) 56.3%; ▌John R. Stewart (Democratic) 43.7%
Pennsylvania 21	Augustine B. Kelley	Democratic	1940	Incumbent re-elected.	▌ ✓ Augustine B. Kelley (Democratic) 61.1%; ▌Herbert O. Morrison (Republican) 38.9%
Pennsylvania 22	John P. Saylor	Republican	1949	Incumbent re-elected.	▌ ✓ John P. Saylor (Republican) 51.9%; ▌Robert S. Glass (Democratic) 48.1%
Pennsylvania 23	Leon H. Gavin	Republican	1942	Incumbent re-elected.	▌ ✓ Leon H. Gavin (Republican) 61.9%; ▌Fred C. Barr (Democratic) 38.1%
Pennsylvania 24	Carroll D. Kearns	Republican	1946	Incumbent re-elected.	▌ ✓ Carroll D. Kearns (Republican) 52.0%; ▌Edmund T. Rogers (Democratic) 48.0%
Pennsylvania 25	Louis E. Graham	Republican	1938	Incumbent lost re-election. Democratic gain.	▌ ✓ Frank M. Clark (Democratic) 53.5%; ▌Louis E. Graham (Republican) 46.5%
Pennsylvania 26	Thomas E. Morgan	Democratic	1944	Incumbent re-elected.	▌ ✓ Thomas E. Morgan (Democratic) 65.3%; ▌Branko Stupar (Republican) 34.7%
Pennsylvania 27	James G. Fulton	Republican	1944	Incumbent re-elected.	▌ ✓ James G. Fulton (Republican) 62.8%; ▌Charles J. Chamberlin (Democratic) 37.2%
Pennsylvania 28	Herman P. Eberharter	Democratic	1936	Incumbent re-elected.	▌ ✓ Herman P. Eberharter (Democratic) 65.1%; ▌Guy C. Read (Republican) 34.9%
Pennsylvania 29	Robert J. Corbett	Republican	1938; 1940 (lost); 1944	Incumbent re-elected.	▌ ✓ Robert J. Corbett (Republican) 60.6%; ▌William G. Foley (Democratic) 39.4%
Pennsylvania 30	Vera Buchanan	Democratic	1951	Incumbent re-elected.	▌ ✓ Vera Buchanan (Democratic) 69.0%; ▌David J. Smith (Republican) 31.0%

== Rhode Island ==
District	Incumbent	Party	First elected	Result	Candidates
Rhode Island 1	Aime Forand	Democratic	1940	Incumbent re-elected.	▌ ✓ Aime Forand (Democratic) 59.1%; ▌Arthur A. Carrellas (Republican) 40.9%
Rhode Island 2	John E. Fogarty	Democratic	1940	Incumbent re-elected.	▌ ✓ John E. Fogarty (Democratic) 60.5%; ▌James O. Watts (Republican) 39.5%

== South Carolina ==
District	Incumbent	Party	First elected	Result	Candidates
South Carolina 1	L. Mendel Rivers	Democratic	1940	Incumbent re-elected.	▌ ✓ L. Mendel Rivers (Democratic) 97.7%; ▌Mrs. John E. Messervey (Republican) 2.3%
South Carolina 2	John J. Riley	Democratic	1950	Incumbent re-elected.	▌ ✓ John J. Riley (Democratic) 97.7%; ▌I. S. Leevy (Republican) 2.3%
South Carolina 3	William J. B. Dorn	Democratic	1946; 1948 (retired); 1950	Incumbent re-elected.	▌ ✓ William J. B. Dorn (Democratic) 99.4%; ▌C. M. Smith (Republican) 0.6%
South Carolina 4	Robert T. Ashmore	Democratic	1953	Incumbent re-elected.	▌ ✓ Robert T. Ashmore (Democratic) 99.2%; ▌Mrs. Lena Bellotts (Republican) 0.8%
South Carolina 5	James P. Richards	Democratic	1932	Incumbent re-elected.	▌ ✓ James P. Richards (Democratic) Uncontested
South Carolina 6	John L. McMillan	Democratic	1938	Incumbent re-elected.	▌ ✓ John L. McMillan (Democratic) 98.9%; ▌Vernon Johnson (Republican) 1.1%

== South Dakota ==
District	Incumbent	Party	First elected	Result	Candidates
South Dakota 1	Harold Lovre	Republican	1948	Incumbent re-elected.	▌ ✓ Harold Lovre (Republican) 58.0%; ▌Francis G. Dunn (Democratic) 42.0%
South Dakota 2	Ellis Yarnal Berry	Republican	1950	Incumbent re-elected.	▌ ✓ Ellis Yarnal Berry (Republican) 62.8%; ▌Ray Satterlee (Democratic) 37.2%

== Tennessee ==
District	Incumbent	Party	First elected	Result	Candidates
Tennessee 1	B. Carroll Reece	Republican	1950	Incumbent re-elected.	▌ ✓ B. Carroll Reece (Republican) 62.5%; ▌Arthur W. Bright (Democratic) 37.5%
Tennessee 2	Howard Baker Sr.	Republican	1950	Incumbent re-elected.	▌ ✓ Howard Baker Sr. (Republican) 58.0%; ▌C. Howard Bozeman (Democratic) 42.0%
Tennessee 3	James B. Frazier Jr.	Democratic	1948	Incumbent re-elected.	▌ ✓ James B. Frazier Jr. (Democratic) 59.2%; ▌O. M. Mickey Spence (Republican) 40.8%
Tennessee 4	Joe L. Evins	Democratic	1946	Incumbent re-elected.	▌ ✓ Joe L. Evins (Democratic) Uncontested
Tennessee 5	Percy Priest	Democratic	1940	Incumbent re-elected.	▌ ✓ Percy Priest (Democratic) 90.8%; ▌Robert M. Donihi (Republican) 9.2%
Tennessee 6	James Patrick Sutton	Democratic	1948	Incumbent retired to run for U.S. Senator. Democratic hold.	▌ ✓ Ross Bass (Democratic) 99.4%; ▌Lon Brewer (Republican) 0.6%
Tennessee 7	Tom J. Murray	Democratic	1942	Incumbent re-elected.	▌ ✓ Tom J. Murray (Democratic) Uncontested
Tennessee 8	Jere Cooper	Democratic	1928	Incumbent re-elected.	▌ ✓ Jere Cooper (Democratic) Uncontested
Tennessee 9	Clifford Davis	Democratic	1940	Incumbent re-elected.	▌ ✓ Clifford Davis (Democratic) 83.5%; ▌Wilmot A. Danielson (Independent) 16.5%

== Texas ==
District	Incumbent	Party	First elected	Result	Candidates
Texas 1	Wright Patman	Democratic	1928	Incumbent re-elected.	▌ ✓ Wright Patman (Democratic) Uncontested
Texas 2	Jack Brooks	Democratic	1952	Incumbent re-elected.	▌ ✓ Jack Brooks (Democratic) Uncontested
Texas 3	Brady P. Gentry	Democratic	1952	Incumbent re-elected.	▌ ✓ Brady P. Gentry (Democratic) Uncontested
Texas 4	Sam Rayburn	Democratic	1912	Incumbent re-elected.	▌ ✓ Sam Rayburn (Democratic) Uncontested
Texas 5	Joseph Franklin Wilson	Democratic	1946	Incumbent retired. Republican gain.	▌ ✓ Bruce Alger (Republican) 52.9%; ▌Wallace Savage (Democratic) 47.1%
Texas 6	Olin E. Teague	Democratic	1946	Incumbent re-elected.	▌ ✓ Olin E. Teague (Democratic) Uncontested
Texas 7	John Dowdy	Democratic	1952	Incumbent re-elected.	▌ ✓ John Dowdy (Democratic) Uncontested
Texas 8	Albert Thomas	Democratic	1936	Incumbent re-elected.	▌ ✓ Albert Thomas (Democratic) 62.1%; ▌William Buttler (Republican) 37.4%; ▌B. F. Hanna (Constitution) 0.5%
Texas 9	Clark W. Thompson	Democratic	1947	Incumbent re-elected.	▌ ✓ Clark W. Thompson (Democratic) Uncontested
Texas 10	Homer Thornberry	Democratic	1948	Incumbent re-elected.	▌ ✓ Homer Thornberry (Democratic) Uncontested
Texas 11	William R. Poage	Democratic	1936	Incumbent re-elected.	▌ ✓ William R. Poage (Democratic) Uncontested
Texas 12	Wingate H. Lucas	Democratic	1946	Incumbent lost renomination. Democratic hold.	▌ ✓ Jim Wright (Democratic) Uncontested
Texas 13	Frank N. Ikard	Democratic	1951	Incumbent re-elected.	▌ ✓ Frank N. Ikard (Democratic) Uncontested
Texas 14	John E. Lyle Jr.	Democratic	1944	Incumbent retired. Democratic hold.	▌ ✓ John J. Bell (Democratic) 93.8%; ▌D. C. DeWitt (Republican) 6.2%
Texas 15	Lloyd Bentsen	Democratic	1948	Incumbent retired. Democratic hold.	▌ ✓ Joe M. Kilgore (Democratic) Uncontested
Texas 16	Kenneth M. Regan	Democratic	1947	Incumbent lost renomination. Democratic hold.	▌ ✓ J. T. Rutherford (Democratic) Uncontested
Texas 17	Omar Burleson	Democratic	1946	Incumbent re-elected.	▌ ✓ Omar Burleson (Democratic) Uncontested
Texas 18	Walter E. Rogers	Democratic	1950	Incumbent re-elected.	▌ ✓ Walter E. Rogers (Democratic) 64.9%; ▌LeRoy LaMaster (Republican) 35.1%
Texas 19	George H. Mahon	Democratic	1934	Incumbent re-elected.	▌ ✓ George H. Mahon (Democratic) Uncontested
Texas 20	Paul J. Kilday	Democratic	1938	Incumbent re-elected.	▌ ✓ Paul J. Kilday (Democratic) Uncontested
Texas 21	O. C. Fisher	Democratic	1942	Incumbent re-elected.	▌ ✓ O. C. Fisher (Democratic) Uncontested
Texas at-large	Martin Dies Jr.	Democratic	1952	Incumbent re-elected.	▌ ✓ Martin Dies Jr. (Democratic) 88.0%; ▌Tom Nolan (Republican) 12.0%

== Utah ==
District	Incumbent	Party	First elected	Result	Candidates
Utah 1	Douglas R. Stringfellow	Republican	1952	Incumbent withdrew. Republican hold.	▌ ✓ Henry Aldous Dixon (Republican) 53.4%; ▌Walter K. Granger (Democratic) 46.6%
Utah 2	William A. Dawson	Republican	1952	Incumbent re-elected.	▌ ✓ William A. Dawson (Republican) 57.2%; ▌Reva Beck Bosone (Democratic) 42.8%

== Vermont ==
District	Incumbent	Party	First elected	Result	Candidates
Vermont at-large	Winston L. Prouty	Republican	1950	Incumbent re-elected.	▌ ✓ Winston L. Prouty (Republican) 61.4%; ▌John J. Boylan Jr. (Democratic) 38.6%

== Virginia ==
District	Incumbent	Party	First elected	Result	Candidates
Virginia 1	Edward J. Robeson Jr.	Democratic	1950	Incumbent re-elected.	▌ ✓ Edward J. Robeson Jr. (Democratic) Uncontested
Virginia 2	Porter Hardy Jr.	Democratic	1946	Incumbent re-elected.	▌ ✓ Porter Hardy Jr. (Democratic) 74.4%; ▌George V. Credle Jr. (Republican) 25.6%
Virginia 3	J. Vaughan Gary	Democratic	1945	Incumbent re-elected.	▌ ✓ J. Vaughan Gary (Democratic) 58.0%; ▌J. Calvitt Clarke Jr. (Republican) 42.0%
Virginia 4	Watkins Abbitt	Democratic	1948	Incumbent re-elected.	▌ ✓ Watkins Abbitt (Democratic) Uncontested
Virginia 5	William M. Tuck	Democratic	1953	Incumbent re-elected.	▌ ✓ William M. Tuck (Democratic) Uncontested
Virginia 6	Richard H. Poff	Republican	1952	Incumbent re-elected.	▌ ✓ Richard H. Poff (Republican) 62.3%; ▌Ernest Robertson (Democratic) 37.4%; ▌J. B. Brayman (Social Democratic) 0.3%
Virginia 7	Burr Harrison	Democratic	1946	Incumbent re-elected.	▌ ✓ Burr Harrison (Democratic) 74.2%; ▌John P. Ruddick (Republican) 25.8%
Virginia 8	Howard W. Smith	Democratic	1930	Incumbent re-elected.	▌ ✓ Howard W. Smith (Democratic) 66.6%; ▌Charmenz S. Lenhart (Independent) 33.4%
Virginia 9	William C. Wampler	Republican	1952	Incumbent lost re-election. Democratic gain.	▌ ✓ W. Pat Jennings (Democratic) 50.5%; ▌William C. Wampler (Republican) 49.2%; ▌John W. Sullivan (Independent) 0.3%
Virginia 10	Joel Broyhill	Republican	1952	Incumbent re-elected.	▌ ✓ Joel Broyhill (Republican) 53.7%; ▌John C. Webb (Democratic) 45.4%; ▌W. Huiet Phillips (Independent) 0.9%

== Washington ==
District	Incumbent	Party	First elected	Result	Candidates
Washington 1	Thomas Pelly	Republican	1952	Incumbent re-elected.	▌ ✓ Thomas Pelly (Republican) 52.6%; ▌Hugh Mitchell (Democratic) 47.4%
Washington 2	Jack Westland	Republican	1952	Incumbent re-elected.	▌ ✓ Jack Westland (Republican) 52.1%; ▌Harry F. Henson (Democratic) 47.9%
Washington 3	Russell V. Mack	Republican	1947	Incumbent re-elected.	▌ ✓ Russell V. Mack (Republican) 64.9%; ▌Clyde V. Tisdale (Democratic) 35.1%
Washington 4	Hal Holmes	Republican	1942	Incumbent re-elected.	▌ ✓ Hal Holmes (Republican) 61.0%; ▌Fred Yoder (Democratic) 39.0%
Washington 5	Walt Horan	Republican	1942	Incumbent re-elected.	▌ ✓ Walt Horan (Republican) 58.6%; ▌Art Garton (Democratic) 41.4%
Washington 6	Thor C. Tollefson	Republican	1946	Incumbent re-elected.	▌ ✓ Thor C. Tollefson (Republican) 55.2%; ▌John T. McCutcheon (Democratic) 44.8%
Washington at-large	Donald H. Magnuson	Democratic	1952	Incumbent re-elected.	▌ ✓ Donald H. Magnuson (Democratic) 57.3%; ▌Al Canwell (Republican) 42.2%; ▌Henry Killman (Socialist Labor) 0.5%

== West Virginia ==
District	Incumbent	Party	First elected	Result	Candidates
West Virginia 1	Bob Mollohan	Democratic	1952	Incumbent re-elected.	▌ ✓ Bob Mollohan (Democratic) 52.7; ▌Arch A. Moore Jr. (Republican) 47.3%
West Virginia 2	Harley O. Staggers	Democratic	1948	Incumbent re-elected.	▌ ✓ Harley O. Staggers (Democratic) 55.0; ▌Albert M. Morgan (Republican) 45.0%
West Virginia 3	Cleveland M. Bailey	Democratic	1948	Incumbent re-elected.	▌ ✓ Cleveland M. Bailey (Democratic) 58.9; ▌Joseph B. Lightburn (Republican) 41.1%
West Virginia 4	Will E. Neal	Republican	1952	Incumbent lost re-election. Democratic gain.	▌ ✓ Maurice G. Burnside (Democratic) 50.2; ▌Will E. Neal (Republican) 49.8%
West Virginia 5	Elizabeth Kee	Democratic	1951 (special)	Incumbent re-elected.	▌ ✓ Elizabeth Kee (Democratic) 67.4; ▌Fred O. Blue (Republican) 32.6%
West Virginia 6	Robert Byrd	Democratic	1952	Incumbent re-elected.	▌ ✓ Robert Byrd (Democratic) 62.7; ▌Pat B. Withrow Jr. (Republican) 37.3%

== Wisconsin ==
District	Incumbent	Party	First elected	Result	Candidates
Wisconsin 1	Lawrence H. Smith	Republican	1941	Incumbent re-elected.	▌ ✓ Lawrence H. Smith (Republican) 54.4; ▌Edward A. Krenzke (Democratic) 45.6%
Wisconsin 2	Glenn Robert Davis	Republican	1947	Incumbent re-elected.	▌ ✓ Glenn Robert Davis (Republican) 54.0; ▌Gaylord Nelson (Democratic) 46.0%
Wisconsin 3	Gardner R. Withrow	Republican	1948	Incumbent re-elected.	▌ ✓ Gardner R. Withrow (Republican) 62.1; ▌Joseph A. Seep (Democratic) 37.9%
Wisconsin 4	Clement Zablocki	Democratic	1948	Incumbent re-elected.	▌ ✓ Clement Zablocki (Democratic) 71.1; ▌John C. Schafer (Republican) 28.9%
Wisconsin 5	Charles J. Kersten	Republican	1950	Incumbent lost re-election. Democratic gain.	▌ ✓ Henry S. Reuss (Democratic) 52.2; ▌Charles J. Kersten (Republican) 47.8%
Wisconsin 6	William Van Pelt	Republican	1950	Incumbent re-elected.	▌ ✓ William Van Pelt (Republican) 62.5; ▌Russel S. Johnson (Democratic) 37.5%
Wisconsin 7	Melvin Laird	Republican	1952	Incumbent re-elected.	▌ ✓ Melvin Laird (Republican) 59.1; ▌Kenneth E. Anderson (Democratic) 40.9%
Wisconsin 8	John W. Byrnes	Republican	1944	Incumbent re-elected.	▌ ✓ John W. Byrnes (Republican) 62.0; ▌Jerome J. Reinke (Democratic) 38.0%
Wisconsin 9	Lester Johnson	Democratic	1953	Incumbent re-elected.	▌ ✓ Lester Johnson (Democratic) 55.4; ▌William E. Owen (Republican) 44.6%
Wisconsin 10	Alvin O'Konski	Republican	1942	Incumbent re-elected.	▌ ✓ Alvin O'Konski (Republican) 59.8; ▌Basil G. Kennedy (Democratic) 40.2%

== Wyoming ==
District	Incumbent	Party	First elected	Result	Candidates
Wyoming at-large	William Henry Harrison III	Republican	1950	Incumbent retired to run for U.S. Senator. Republican hold.	▌ ✓ Keith Thomson (Republican) 56.2%; ▌Sam Tully (Democratic) 43.8%

== Non-voting delegates ==
=== Alaska Territory ===
District	Incumbent			This race	
District	Representative	Party	First elected	Results	Candidates
Alaska Territory at-large	Bob Bartlett	Democratic	1944	Incumbent re-elected.	▌ ✓ Bob Bartlett (Democratic) 73.8%; ▌Barbara D. Dimock (Republican) 26.2%

== See also ==
- 1954 United States elections
  - 1954 United States Senate elections
- 83rd United States Congress
- 84th United States Congress

== Works cited ==
- Abramson, Paul; Aldrich, John; Rohde, David (1995). Change and Continuity in the 1992 Elections. CQ Press. ISBN 0871878399.
- Bean Louis, Influences in the 1954 Mid-Term Elections. Washington: Public Affairs Institute, 1954
