= Herbert J. Drane =

American politician (1863–1947)

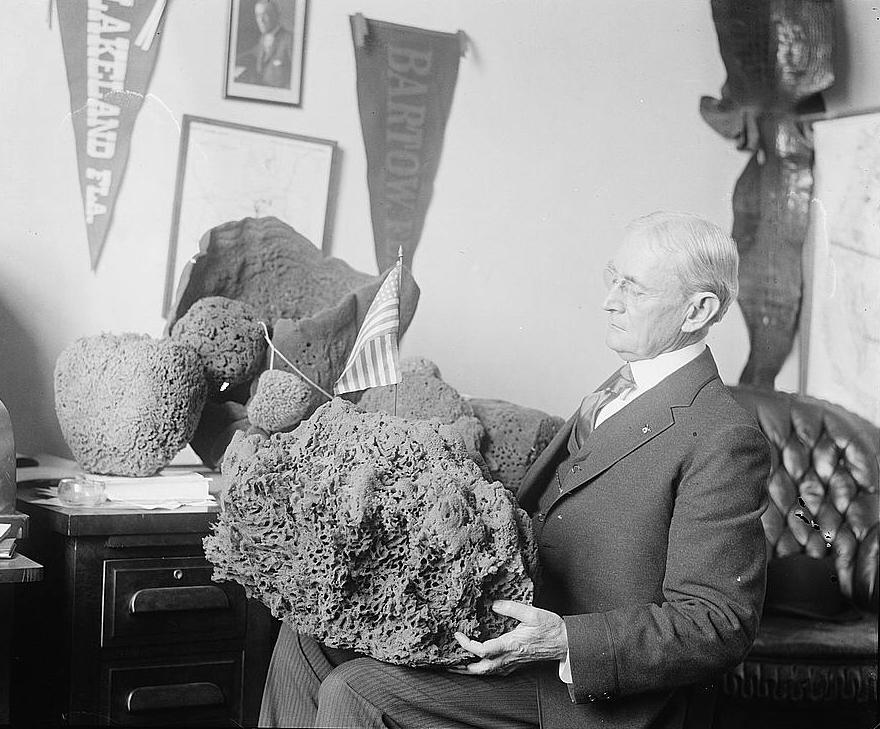

Member of the Federal Power Commission
- In office June 16, 1933 - June 22, 1937
- President: Franklin D. Roosevelt

Member of the U.S. House of Representatives from Florida's 1st district
- In office March 4, 1917 – March 3, 1933
- Preceded by: Stephen M. Sparkman
- Succeeded by: J. Hardin Peterson

Member of the Florida Senate
- In office 1913–1917

Member of the Florida House of Representatives
- In office 1903–1905

Personal details
- Born: 20 June 1863 Franklin, Kentucky, U.S.
- Died: 11 August 1947 (aged 84) Lakeland, Florida, U.S.
- Party: Democratic

Herbert Jackson Drane (June 20, 1863 – August 11, 1947) was a U.S. representative from Florida.

Born in Franklin, Kentucky, Drane attended the public schools of Louisville, Kentucky, and Brevards Academy at Franklin, Kentucky. He moved to Macon, Georgia, in 1881, and to Lakeland (of which he was one of the founders), Polk County, Florida, in November 1883. He became editor of the local newspaper and also engaged in the real-estate and insurance business, railway construction, and in the growing of citrus fruits. He served as mayor of Lakeland 1888–1892. County commissioner of Polk County 1896–1899. Chief engrossing clerk of the State house of representatives 1889–1901. He served as member of the State house of representatives 1903–1905. He served in the State senate 1913–1917, being its president from 1913 to 1915.

Drane was elected as a Democrat to the Sixty-fifth and to the seven succeeding Congresses (March 4, 1917 – March 3, 1933). He was an unsuccessful candidate for renomination in 1932, losing the Democratic primary to J. Hardin Peterson. He served as member of the Federal Power Commission 1933–1937. He resumed the real estate and insurance businesses, property management, and the growing of citrus fruits. He died in Lakeland, Florida, on August 11, 1947. He was interred in Roselawn Cemetery.

U.S. House of Representatives
Preceded by Stephen M. Sparkman	Member of the U.S. House of Representatives from Florida's 1st congressional district 1917 – 1933	Succeeded by J. Hardin Peterson
