= J. Hardin Peterson =

American politician (1894–1978)

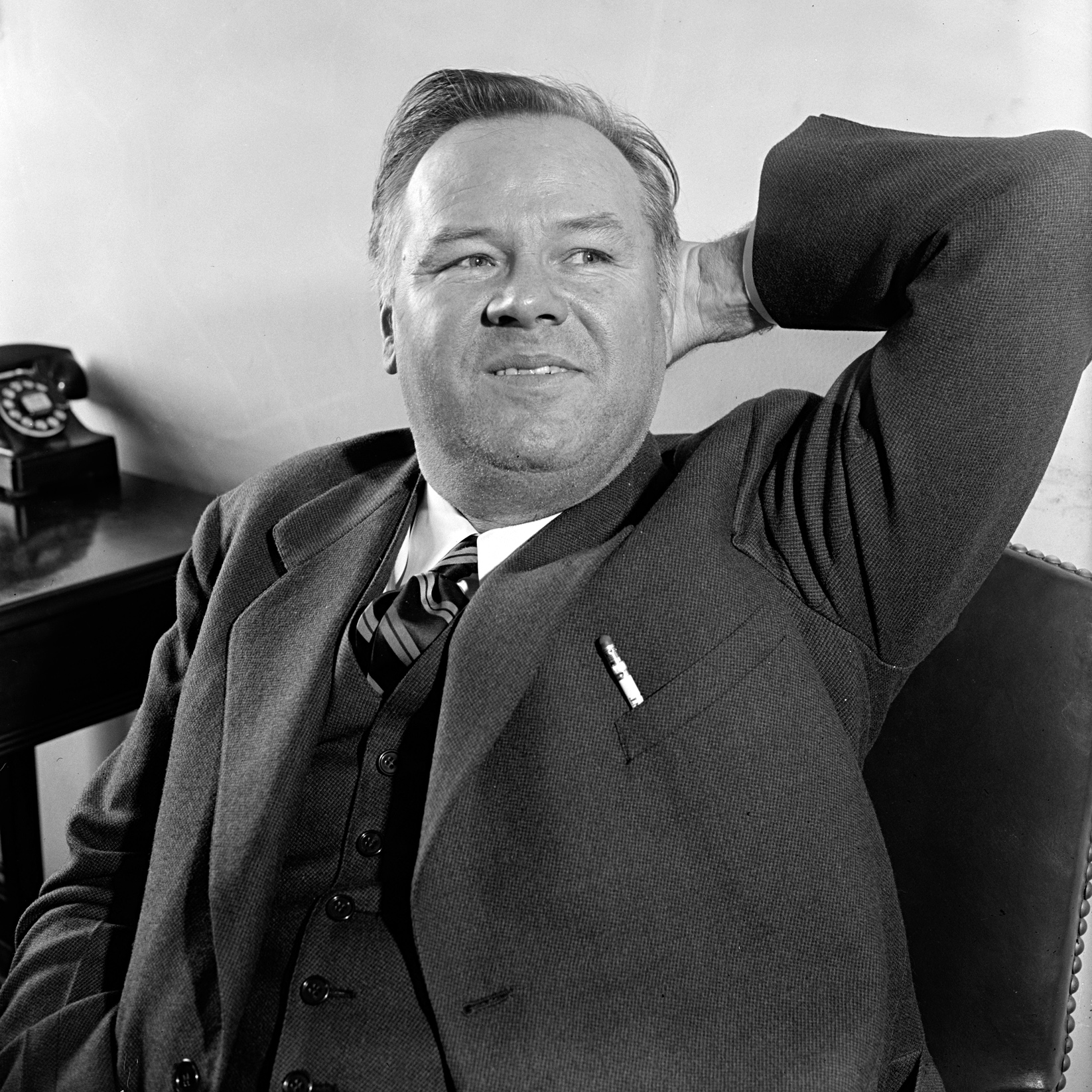

Member of the U.S. House of Representatives from Florida's 1st district
- In office March 4, 1933 – January 3, 1951
- Preceded by: Herbert J. Drane
- Succeeded by: Chester B. McMullen

Personal details
- Born: James Hardin Peterson; February 11, 1894 Batesburg, South Carolina, US
- Died: March 28, 1978 (aged 84) Lakeland, Florida, US
- Party: Democratic

James Hardin Peterson (February 11, 1894 – March 28, 1978) was a U.S. representative from Florida.

== Early life and career ==
Peterson was born in Batesburg, South Carolina. His family moved to Lakeland, Florida, in 1903, and he attended the public schools there. Peterson graduated from the University of Florida College of Law in 1914. He was admitted to the bar and was a law clerk in the United States General Land Office the same year. He entered private practice in Lakeland in 1915.

Peterson was city attorney of Lakeland, Florida, in 1916, 1917, and 1919–1932, of Frostproof, Florida from 1918 to 1929, of Lake Wales, Florida from 1920 to 1930, and of Eagle Lake, Florida from 1923 to 1933. Peterson served as a chief yeoman in the United States Navy from 1917 to 1919, during World War I. Peterson served as prosecuting attorney and county solicitor of Polk County, Florida from 1921 to 1932. He served as special counsel for the state Department of Agriculture from 1930 to 1932. In the early 1930s, he also taught Sunday school at First Methodist Church in Lakeland, Florida

== Congress ==
Peterson was elected as a Democrat to the United States House of Representatives from Florida's 1st congressional district in the 1932 election, defeating Herbert J. Drane, who had served in the United States Congress since 1917. He served in the 73rd Congress and the eight succeeding Congresses (March 4, 1933 to January 3, 1951). Peterson served as chairman of the Committee on Public Lands during the 78th, 79th, and 81st Congresses).

Peterson was not a candidate for renomination in 1950 to the 82nd Congress.

== Later career and death ==
After leaving Congress, he resumed the practice of law in Lakeland. He served as special counsel for the Territorial Government of Guam, chairman of Commission on Federal Application of Laws to Guam, and chairman and vice chairman of the board of directors of the First State Bank of Lakeland.

Peterson died in Lakeland in 1978, and was interred in Roselawn Cemetery.

== See also ==
- List of members of the House Un-American Activities Committee

U.S. House of Representatives
Preceded by Herbert J. Drane	Member of the U.S. House of Representatives from Florida's 1st congressional district 1933 – 1951	Succeeded by Chester B. McMullen
