= Chester B. McMullen =

American politician (1902–1953)

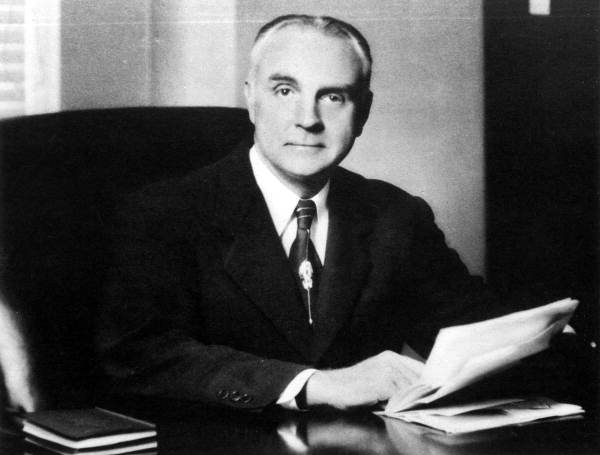

Member of the U.S. House of Representatives from Florida's 1st district
- In office January 3, 1951 – January 3, 1953
- Preceded by: J. Hardin Peterson
- Succeeded by: Courtney W. Campbell

Personal details
- Born: December 6, 1902 Largo, Florida, U.S.
- Died: November 3, 1953 (aged 50) Clearwater, Florida, U.S.
- Party: Democratic
- Spouse: Veda E. Ulmer

Chester Bartow McMullen (December 6, 1902 – November 3, 1953) was an American lawyer and politician from the state of Florida. He served one term in the United States House of Representatives from 1951 to 1953.

== Early life and career ==
McMullen was born in Largo, Florida to Eli and Emma Cox McMullen and attended Largo High School. His paternal grandfather, Daniel McMullen (d. 1908), was one of Largo's first homesteaders, and his father was Pinellas County's first tax collector upon its secession from Hillsborough County in 1912. He graduated from the University of Florida College of Law in 1924. He was admitted to the bar the same year and entered private practice in Clearwater, Florida.

McMullen served as prosecuting attorney of Pinellas County from 1927 to 1928. In 1923 while at UF he married Veda E. Ulmer, daughter of prominent Largo planter and banker M.W. Ulmer with whom he had two children: Chester Jr. and Elizabeth.

== Political career ==
McMullen was elected state attorney for Florida's Sixth Judicial Circuit in 1930. He served as state attorney for 20 years, until he was elected as a Democrat to the United States House of Representatives as the representative of Florida's 1st congressional district in the 1950 election. He served only a single term, from January 3, 1951 to January 3, 1953, during the 82nd Congress; he did not seek reelection in 1952.

== Death ==
He died back in Clearwater soon after leaving office in 1953 and was interred in Sylvan Abbey there. McMullen also served as director of the First National Bank of Clearwater.

U.S. House of Representatives
Preceded by J. Hardin Peterson	Member of the U.S. House of Representatives from Florida's 1st congressional district 1951 – 1953	Succeeded by Courtney W. Campbell
