= Courtney W. Campbell =

American politician (1895–1971)

Courtney Warren Campbell
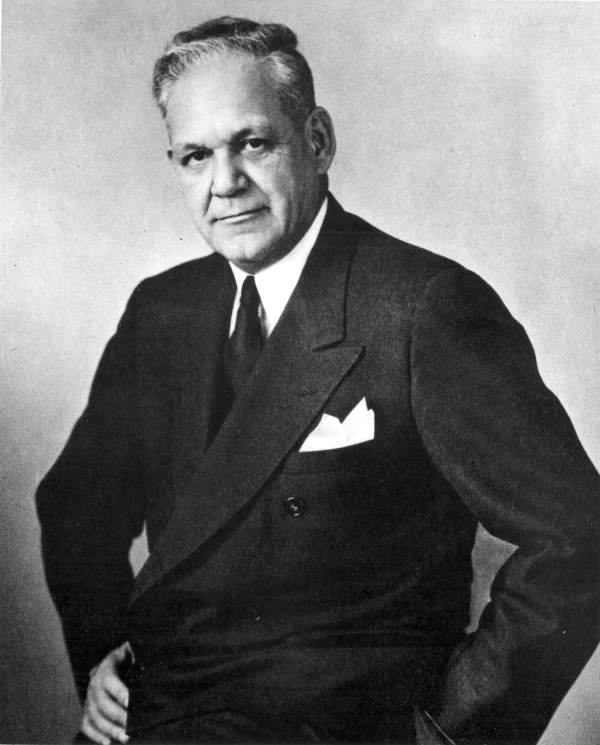
- U.S. Representative Courtney Campbell (c.1953)

Member of the U.S. House of Representatives from Florida's 1st district
- In office January 3, 1953 – January 3, 1955
- Preceded by: Chester B. McMullen
- Succeeded by: William C. Cramer

Personal details
- Born: April 29, 1895 Chillicothe, Missouri, U.S.
- Died: December 22, 1971 (aged 76) Dunedin, Florida, U.S.
- Resting place: Sylvan Abbey Memorial Park in Clearwater, Florida
- Party: Democratic
- Education: Westminster College; University of Missouri
- Occupation: Businessman, citrus farmer, lawyer

Courtney Warren Campbell (April 29, 1895 – December 22, 1971) was an American lawyer, World War I veteran, and politician who served one term as a Democratic member of the United States House of Representatives, from 1953 to 1955. He represented Florida's 1st congressional district, which was then based in St. Petersburg, Florida.

== Background ==
Campbell, the son of Thomas Courtney Campbell and Ellen Minor Campbell, was born in Chillicothe, Missouri, and educated at Westminster College in Fulton, Missouri, and later at the University of Missouri at Columbia.

=== World War I ===
During World War I, he served as a second lieutenant in the United States Army.

=== Legal practice ===
He studied law and was admitted to the bar in 1924 in Missouri and Florida and practiced from 1924 to 1928 in Tampa. He also worked as a citrus farmer, banker, and land developer. He was married to the former Henrietta Hisgen.

== Political life ==
Campbell served as the assistant attorney general of Florida and from 1941 to 1946 was a member of the Florida War Labor Relations Board. From 1942 to 1947, he was a member of the Florida State Road Board.

=== Courtney Campbell Causeway ===
In 1948, the Davis Causeway across Tampa Bay was renamed the Courtney Campbell Causeway in his honor. Campbell had spearheaded efforts to ensure repairs and beautification of the causeway.

=== Congress ===
In 1952, he was elected to the 83rd Congress and served one term from 1953 to 1955. He was an unsuccessful candidate for re-election in 1954, losing a close race to William C. Cramer, whom Campbell had defeated in 1952.

== Later career and death ==
After his single term in Congress, Campbell returned to his extensive business and civic interests and resided in Clearwater, Florida. He died in Dunedin, Florida, and is interred at Sylvan Abbey Memorial Park in Clearwater.

U.S. House of Representatives
Preceded by Chester B. McMullen	United States Representative from Florida's 1st congressional district (then Pinellas, Hillsborough, Pasco, and Hernando counties); 1953–1955	Succeeded by William C. Cramer
