= 1954 United States Senate election in Tennessee =

- November 2, 1954
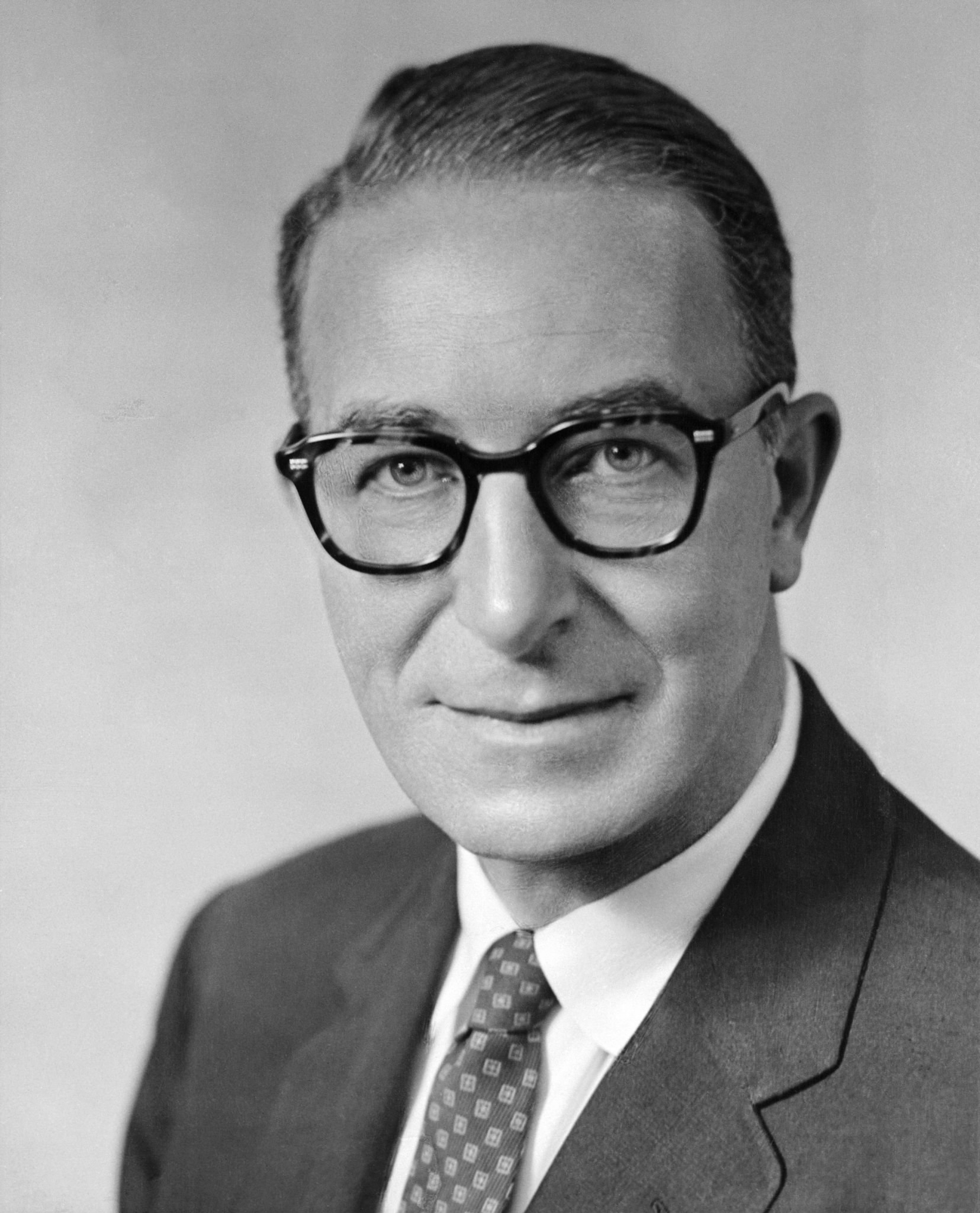

Nominee	Estes Kefauver	Thomas P. Wall Jr
Party	Democratic	Republican
Popular vote	249,121	106,971
Percentage	69.96%	30.04%
- County results Kefauver: 50–60% 60–70% 70–80% 80–90% 90–100% Wall: 50–60% 60–70% 70–80%
Senator before election
Estes Kefauver
Democratic
Elected Senator
Estes Kefauver
Democratic

The 1954 United States Senate election in Tennessee took place on November 2, 1954, concurrently with United States Senate elections in other states as well as elections to the United States House of Representatives and various state and local elections. Incumbent Democratic Senator Estes Kefauver won re-election, defeating Republican candidate Thomas P. Wall Jr.

== Democratic primary ==
Democratic Party primary results
Party	Candidate	Votes	%
Democratic	Estes Kefauver (incumbent)	440,497	68.19%
Democratic	James Patrick Sutton	186,363	28.85%
Democratic	Edward Brown	9,644	1.49%
Democratic	John Randolph Neal Jr.	9,446	1.46%
Total votes		645,950	100.00%

== Republican primary ==
Republican Party primary results
Party	Candidate	Votes	%
Republican	Ray H. Jenkins	45,015	81.74%
Republican	Robert C. Gregory	10,053	18.26%
Total votes		55,068	100.00%

== General election ==
General election results
Party	Candidate	Votes	%
Democratic	Estes Kefauver (incumbent)	249,121	69.96%
Republican	Thomas P. Wall Jr.	106,971	30.04%
None	Write-Ins	2	0.00%
Majority		142,150	39.92%
Turnout		356,094	
Democratic hold			

== See also ==
- 1954 United States Senate elections
- 1954 Tennessee gubernatorial election
