= Clyde V. Tisdale =

American politician

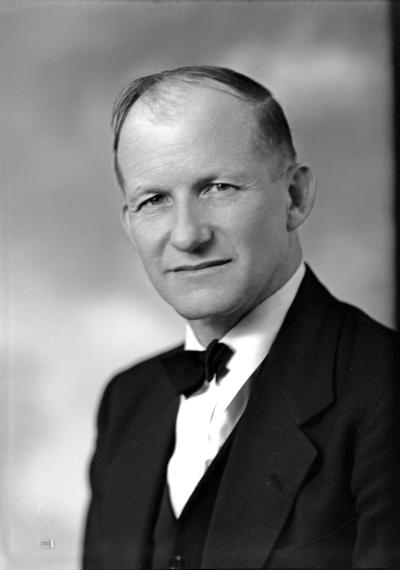
- Tisdale in 1937

Member of the Washington House of Representatives for the 19th district
- In office 1937–1945; 1957–1959

Member of the Washington State Senate for the 19th district
- In office 1945–1953

Personal details
- Born: March 24, 1890 Inwood, California, United States
- Died: January 31, 1975 (aged 84) Raymond, Washington, United States
- Party: Democratic

Clyde Vernon Tisdale (March 24, 1890 – January 31, 1975) was an American politician in the state of Washington. He served in the Washington House of Representatives and Washington State Senate.
