= William C. Cramer =

American politician (1922–2003)

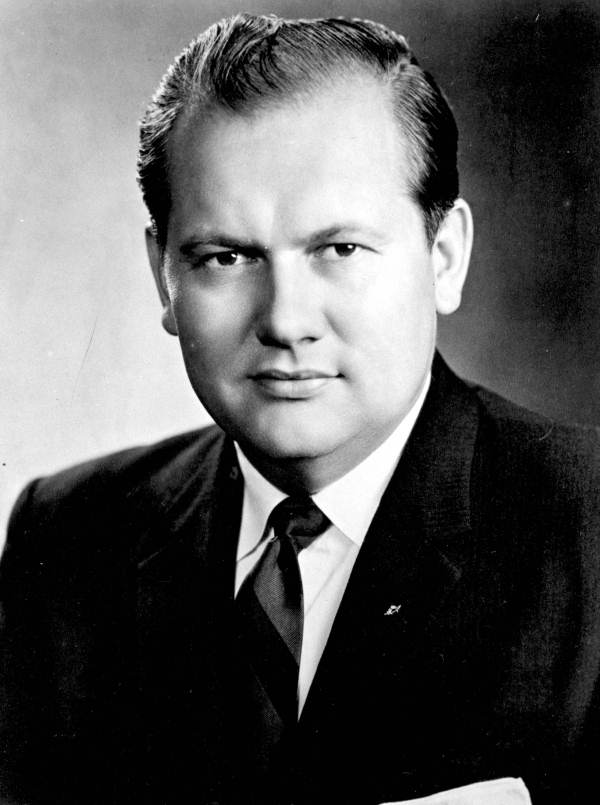

Member of the U.S. House of Representatives from Florida
- In office January 3, 1955 – January 3, 1971
- Preceded by: Courtney W. Campbell
- Succeeded by: Bill Young
- Constituency: 1st district (1955–1963); 12th district (1963–1967); 8th district (1967–1971)

Member of the Florida House of Representatives from Pinellas County
- In office 1951–1953

County attorney for Pinellas County
- In office 1953–1954

Personal details
- Born: William Cato Cramer; August 4, 1922 Denver, Colorado, U.S.
- Died: October 18, 2003 (aged 81) South Pasadena, Florida, U.S.
- Resting place: Woodlawn Memory Gardens in St. Petersburg, Florida
- Party: Republican (1950–2003)
- Spouse(s): (1) Alice J. Cramer (divorced) (2) Sarah Ellen Bromelow Cramer (married ca. 1992–2003, his death)
- Children: 3
- Education: St. Petersburg Junior College; University of North Carolina at Chapel Hill; Harvard Law School
- Profession: Attorney

William Cato Cramer Sr. (August 4, 1922 – October 18, 2003), was an American attorney, lobbyist, and Republican Party politician who represented Florida in the United States House of Representatives from 1955 to 1971. His district was centered on his hometown of St. Petersburg and Pinellas County. As the first Republican elected to represent Florida since 1880, Cramer was a significant figure in the revival of the state party, and his 1954 election was an early example of Republican resurgence in the Southern United States.

Cramer was born in Denver, Colorado and raised in St. Petersburg. After serving in the United States Navy and graduating from Harvard Law School, he returned to St. Petersburg and entered politics as a liberal Republican. He was elected county attorney and represented Pinellas County in the Florida House of Representatives. In 1954, Cramer unseated incumbent Democratic representative Courtney W. Campbell by a narrow margin. He served in the House until 1970, when he ran for the United States Senate but was defeated by Lawton Chiles.

In the U.S. House, Cramer was ranking member of the subcommittee on Roads and influenced federal highway policy during a period of major expansion, including by ensuring that the Interstate Highway System remained toll-free and securing federal funding for Interstate 75 between Tampa and Miami. He was also instrumental in reviving the Republican Party of Florida, taking advantage of the state's changing demographics by recruiting Republican migrants from the Northern and Midwestern states and Cuban Americans. From 1964 until 1984, Cramer represented Florida on the Republican National Committee and served as its legal counsel for six years.

== Early life and education ==
William Cato Cramer was born on August 4, 1922 in Denver, Colorado. When he was three years old, his parents relocated the family to St. Petersburg, Florida.

Cramer attended segregated public schools and graduated from St. Petersburg High School, where he ran for student government. He attended St. Petersburg Junior College, the first public community college in Florida. As a teenager, Cramer worked a variety of jobs, including as a bellhop at a resort hotel in North Carolina before entering the University of North Carolina at Chapel Hill.

In 1943, Cramer left school to enlist in the United States Navy as a gunnery officer and fought in the liberation of France during World War II. After the war, he completed his degree in 1946 while continuing to serve in the United States Naval Reserve.

In 1948, Cramer graduated from Harvard Law School and returned to St. Petersburg to enter private practice.

== Early political career ==
In January 1950, Cramer joined the Republican Party and ran for the Florida House of Representatives. At the time, voter registration in Florida favored the Democratic Party by a margin of roughly fourteen-to-one. While Florida had elected some Republicans during the Reconstruction era, the subsequent disfranchisement of African Americans had sharply limited the party's electoral opportunities in Florida and throughout the Southern United States for several decades. However, postwar migration from the Northern United States (in particular, by Republican retirees and business executives) and increasing urbanization had begun to reverse this dynamic within Pinellas County and other urban counties during the 1940s. In 1948, Republican presidential candidate Thomas E. Dewey had carried Pinellas, Sarasota, Palm Beach, Broward, and Orange counties and a third of the statewide vote.

Cramer also served as the campaign manager for the Pinellas County Republican Party in 1950. His running mates, none of whom had previously sought office, ran on a platform criticizing inefficient government and machine politics. Cramer and all but one of the fourteen Republican candidates on his ticket were elected. His victory made Cramer one of only three Republicans in the Florida House of Representatives. In 1967, The Tampa Tribune referred to this foundational victory with a reference to John 1:1: "In the beginning there was the party, and the party was with Bill Cramer, and the party was Bill Cramer."

In 1951, Cramer's two legislative colleagues named him minority leader; members of the Democratic majority teased them for "caucusing in a phone booth." Despite this, Cramer used the position to assert the Republicans' procedural rights under House rules and raise his profile as a state politician. As minority leader, he also defended junior colleges, citing his own experience as a graduate of St. Petersburg, and worked to establish the state's first commission on crime. However, he lost a political fight to have any Republicans appointed to the commission.

== U.S. House of Representatives (1955–71) ==
Cramer represented Florida's 1st congressional district from 1955 to 1963. Reapportionment placed him in the 12th district from 1963 to 1967. Another reapportionment assigned him to the 8th district for his final two terms in office, 1967 to 1971. He gave up his seat in 1970 to run for United States Senate and was succeeded by his former aide, Bill Young, who served until his death in 2013. As a representative of the growing Southern faction of the Republican Party, he also became an increasingly influential figure in state and national party politics, though he often conflicted with Claude R. Kirk Jr., and their feud led both to defeat in the 1970 elections.

Cramer was also vice chairman of the House Republican Conference, which became more influential as representation increased from southern states.

=== Elections ===
In 1952, Cramer ran for a newly-created seat in the U.S. House. His Democratic opponent in the general election was Courtney W. Campbell, a Clearwater businessman and a former member of the state highway board. Cramer spent $25,000 in a handshaking tour of Pinellas, Hillsborough, Pasco, and Hernando counties, and he benefited from continued Republican gains in the state and region, including the victory of Dwight D. Eisenhower in the state's presidential election. However, Campbell defeated him narrowly by less than one percent of the vote. Cramer was appointed Pinellas County attorney, serving for two years.

In 1954, Cramer ran again, challenging Campbell for a second term. With a stronger organization and additional fundraising, Cramer unseated Campbell by a narrow margin. Florida representative Bob Sikes later remarked that Campbell was an ineffective public speaker during the campaign, while "Cramer was articulate, a successful lawyer, and he already enjoyed some recognition in public life."

=== Civil rights ===
Cramer had a mixed record on the civil rights movement during his time in Congress. In 1956, Cramer joined other Southern Congressmen in signing the 1956 anti-desegregation Southern Manifesto. In 1957, Cramer joined four other Southern Republican colleagues in seeking to persuade Eisenhower to remove federal troops from Little Rock, Arkansas, where they had been deployed to maintain order during the integration of local public schools. Eisenhower kept troops in the city through 1958 for the remainder of the school year.

He later voted against the Civil Rights Acts of 1957, 1960, and 1964. He voted in favor of the initial House version of the Civil Rights Act of 1968 but voted against its final passage after amendments in the Senate. During debate over the 1968 Act, Cramer successfully introduced amendments to make assaulting a police officer a federal crime and to make crossing state lines to participate in a riot qualify as a conspiracy to commit a federal crime. This law was later used to prosecute five of the Chicago Seven and Angela Davis.

He did not vote on the 24th Amendment to the U.S. Constitution and voted in favor of the Voting Rights Act of 1965.

=== Highways ===
In time, Cramer became the ranking member on the House Committee on Public Works. He was also ranking member of the subcommittee on roads and was influential in federal highway policy during a period of extensive federal investment in highways. Cramer worked to address corruption in highway politics, keep the Interstate Highway System toll-free, and ensure that highway funds were invested in roads. He opposed the Sunshine State Parkway in Florida, which threatened to draw traffic off federal highways and make them unfeasible. Using his influence, Cramer secured funding to provide link Tampa and Miami via Interstate 75, which passed through St. Petersburg.

=== 1964 presidential election ===
As a leading Republican Party figure in Florida and the South, Cramer often represented the region in presidential campaigns, and his endorsement was sought after by presidential candidates. He was a delegate or alternate delegate to every Republican National Convention from 1952 to 1984. In 1964, Cramer was elected to represent Florida on the Republican National Committee; he would serve until 1984.

In 1964, he also led of a slate of candidates for Florida's delegation to the Republican National Convention supporting Barry Goldwater. Cramer ran in opposition to a slate of party regulars led by Harold Alexander and Tom Fairfield Brown of Tampa, and he claimed that Goldwater had told him that state leadership had been too passive in trying to develop the party. The Republican primary was competitive, but Goldwater declined to publicly back the Cramer slate, and fellow U.S. representative Edward Gurney withdrew his support during the campaign. The insurgent Cramer slate narrowly lost. Cramer claimed that the insurgents would have won if Goldwater had backed them.

=== Growing feud with Claude R. Kirk (1964–70) ===
In the 1964 general election, California transplant Claude R. Kirk Jr. ran a relatively competitive campaign for United States Senate as a Republican against the veteran Democratic incumbent, Spessard Holland, claiming 36 percent of the vote. In 1966, Kirk won a surprising election as Governor of Florida over Miami mayor Robert King High. During and after Kirk's campaign for governor, the growing state party divided between supporters of Cramer and Kirk.

After his victory, Kirk passed over Cramer for chair of his inaugural committee, instead asking U.S. representative Edward Gurney, who had played no role in the campaign. At the 1968 state party convention in Orlando, members of Kirk's staff unsuccessfully attempted to marshal opposition to Cramer's re-election as national committeeman. In 1968, Gurney ran for United States Senate with Cramer's support. Cramer declined to run in the Republican primary on the understanding that Gurney would support him for the other seat in 1970; Gurney later claimed that he was unaware that Cramer ever considered running. Although Cramer's former law partner Herman Goldner ran, he received few votes. Gurney won the primary and the general election over former governor LeRoy Collins.

However, Kirk continued to build up Gurney as a counterweight to Cramer, including by granting Gurney's law firm a $100,000 per year retainer as counsel for the Florida Turnpike Authority.

In 1988, Kirk claimed that Cramer had wanted the gubernatorial nomination for himself and had not provided any support for his 1964 or 1966 campaigns; Cramer disputed this claim. Cramer said the schism had developed in 1966, when Kirk declined to merge his campaign with the Republican organization in Pinellas, instead seeking to maximize support from Democratic voters dissatisfied with the nomination of High.

== 1970 United States Senate election ==
=== Primary campaign ===
In 1969, Cramer declared his candidacy for the United States Senate with encouragement from President Richard Nixon. He was opposed by G. Harrold Carswell, a failed nominee for the Supreme Court of the United States earlier in the year. Both Kirk and Gurney endorsed Carswell.

In parallel, Jack Eckerd, a Pennsylvania transplant and drugstore magnate, ran against Kirk for the Republican nomination, predicting that Kirk's renomination would mean defeat in the general election. Although Cramer did not publicly take a position in the primary, he privately voted for Eckerd, and Kirk later accused Cramer of providing covert support to the Eckerd campaign.

In the September primary, Cramer easily defeated Carswell and businessman George Balmer. Cramer attributed his victory to grassroots support and Carswell's lack of campaign experience. In the gubernatorial primary, neither Kirk nor Eckerd received a majority of the vote; Kirk later won the runoff election when the third candidate in the race, Skip Bafalis, endorsed him.

=== General election ===
In the general election, both Cramer and Kirk were endorsed by their respective primary opponents, but neither Carswell nor Eckerd were active in the campaign, and the Republican Party remained divided. By contrast, the Democratic Party was united behind their nominees, Lawton Chiles for senator and Reubin Askew for governor. The Miami Herald, which endorsed the Democratic ticket, noted that Kirk and Cramer formed an "uneasy alliance." Cramer struggled to gain traction against the popular Chiles, who had become broadly popular during the primary campaign after his 92-day, 1,000 mile walk from the Panhandle to Key Largo. Cramer sought to paint Chiles as a liberal, but The New York Times observed that Chiles and Askew "convey[ed] amiable good ol' boy qualities with moderate-to-liberal aspirations that do not strike fear into the hearts of conservatives."

In the final result, Cramer received approximately 46 percent of the vote. He ran significantly ahead of Kirk and carried five counties which Kirk had lost, including Pinellas, while Kirk took two counties lost by Cramer, Clay and St. Johns. Cramer, Gurney, and Kirk later disagreed on the reasons for the party's 1970 defeats. Cramer cited the intraparty schism, his reliance on an out-of-state public relations firm not well versed in Florida politics, and the $350,000 spending limit which did not permit sufficient television advertising, while both Gurney and Kirk considered the Democratic ticket too strong to defeat.

== Later years ==
Cramer remained involved in politics after his defeat, including through his long service on the Republican National Committee.

In January 1971, he supported Panama City automobile dealer Tommy Thomas for chair of the state party. Thomas defeated incumbent Duke Crittenden, who was endorsed by Gurney. Although United States senators historically controlled patronage appointments in their own state, three U.S. representatives allied with Cramer wrote to Nixon to urge that he prefer Cramer's advice over Gurney's; Gurney quickly moved to meet with the representatives, and they never mailed their letter. Gurney was later indicted in an influence peddling scandal; he declined to run for re-election and resigned in December 1974. In 1974, the Republican Party of Florida honored Cramer as "Mr. Republican."

Cramer never sought public office again and declined to consider an appointment as a federal judge. Instead, he returned to private practice, opening law offices in Washington, D.C. and Miami. In 1973, his firm, Cramer & Matthews, served as unpaid advisors to Gerald Ford during his vice presidential confirmation hearings before the Senate. Cramer also advised Ford on his decision to pardon Richard Nixon for his involvement in the Watergate scandal. Cramer was selected by the Ford administration to head the first trade mission to China after the normalization of relations.

Cramer lobbied Congress and the executive branch on behalf of several foreign governments, including that of President Anastasio Somoza of Nicaragua.

In fall 1988, Cramer returned to St. Petersburg, established another law practice, and became involved in real estate.

== Personal life and death ==
After graduating law school, Cramer married Alice of Dothan, Alabama. They had three children together before divorcing decades later.

Cramer was a member of Veterans of Foreign Wars, the St. Petersburg College Alumni Association Board of Directors, the American Legion, AMVETS, the Benevolent and Protective Order of Elks, the Order of the Eastern Star, the Moose International, and the Shriners. He was Methodist.

Cramer died at the age of eighty-one in South Pasadena, Florida, from complications of a heart attack. He was survived by his second wife of eleven years, the former Sarah Ellen (née Bromelow) Hilber. Cramer is interred at Woodlawn Memory Gardens in St. Petersburg.

=== Legacy ===
The William C. Cramer Post Office in St. Petersburg is named in his honor.

In November 2005, The Florida Legislature dedicated the section of I-275 in Pinellas County as the "William C. Cramer Memorial Highway".

== Electoral history ==
1st Florida United States House District, 1952

- Courtney W. Campbell – 69,149 (50.68%)
- William C. Cramer – 67,286 (49.32%)

1st Florida United States House District, 1954

- William C. Cramer – 52,287 (50.75%)
- Courtney W. Campbell – 50,744 (49.25%)

1st Florida United States House District, 1956

- William C. Cramer – 105,958 (56.35%)
- Winton H. "Win" King – 82,075 (43.65%)

U.S. House of Representatives
| Preceded by Courtney W. Campbell | United States Representative from Florida's 1st congressional district 1955–1963 | Succeeded by Robert L. F. Sikes |
| Preceded by New district | United States Representative from Florida's 12th congressional district 1963–1967 | Succeeded by Dante Fascell |
| Preceded by Donald R. Matthews | United States Representative from Florida's 8th congressional district 1967–1971 | Succeeded by Charles William "Bill" Young |
Party political offices
| Preceded by Claude R. Kirk, Jr. (1964) | Republican nominee for U.S. Senator from Florida; 1970 | Succeeded by Dr. John Grady (1976) |
