= D. R. Matthews =

American politician (1907–1997)

Billy Matthews
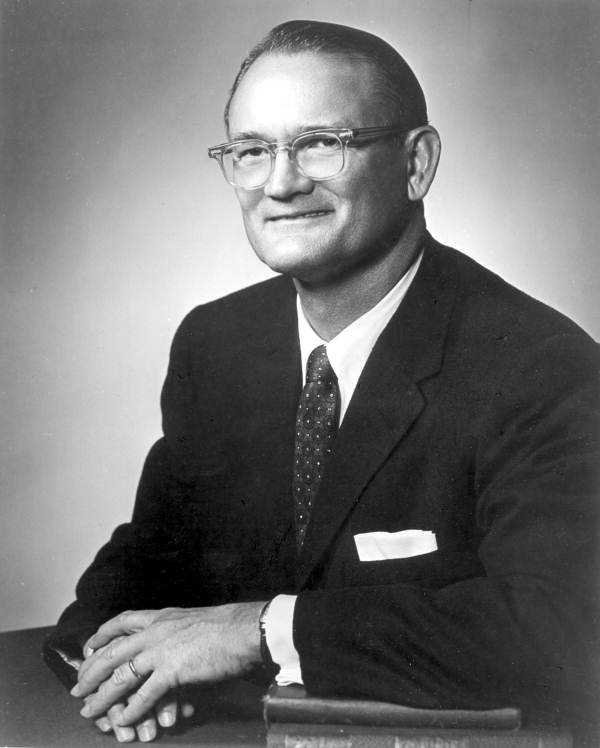

Member of the U.S. House of Representatives from Florida's 8th district
- In office January 3, 1953 – January 3, 1967
- Preceded by: District created
- Succeeded by: William C. Cramer

Member of the Florida House of Representatives
- In office 1935

Personal details
- Born: Donald Ray Matthews; October 3, 1907 Micanopy, Florida
- Died: October 26, 1997 (aged 90) Gainesville, Florida
- Resting place: Hawthorne Cemetery
- Party: Democratic
- Spouse: Mary Matthews

Donald Ray "Billy" Matthews (October 3, 1907 – October 26, 1997) was an American educator, World War II veteran and politician who served seven terms as a U.S. representative from Florida from 1953 to 1967.

== Life and career ==
Born in Micanopy, Florida, Matthews attended the public schools of Hawthorne, Florida.

He graduated from the University of Florida at Gainesville in 1929 and taught school in Leesburg, Florida, and in Orlando, Florida from 1929 to 1935. He also served as a high school principal in Newberry, Florida in 1935 and 1936.

He served as a member of the State house of representatives in 1935 was a member of the administrative staff of the University of Florida from 1936 to 1952.

He served as assistant State 4-H agent in the summers of 1928–1938.

=== World War II ===
He served in the United States Army from 1942 to 1946 and was discharged as a captain of Infantry.

== Congress ==
Matthews was elected as a Democrat to the Eighty-third and to the six succeeding Congresses (January 3, 1953 – January 3, 1967), during which time he was a signatory to the 1956 Southern Manifesto that opposed the desegregation of public schools ordered by the Supreme Court in Brown v. Board of Education.

He was an unsuccessful candidate for reelection to the Ninetieth Congress in 1966, defeated in the Democratic primary by Don Fuqua.

== Later career ==
In his post-congressional years, Matthews worked as a consultant and administrator for the Rural Community Development Service of the United States Department of Agriculture from 1967 to 1969. He was also an instructor of political science at Santa Fe Community College (Gainesville, Florida) from 1969 to 1977.

He was a resident of Gainesville, Florida until his death.

== Death and burial ==
Billy Matthews died on October 26, 1997 at the age of 90. He was interred at Hawthorne Cemetery.

U.S. House of Representatives
Preceded by District created	Member of the U.S. House of Representatives from Florida's 8th congressional district 1953-1967	Succeeded by William C. Cramer
