= List of schools in the London Borough of Hounslow =

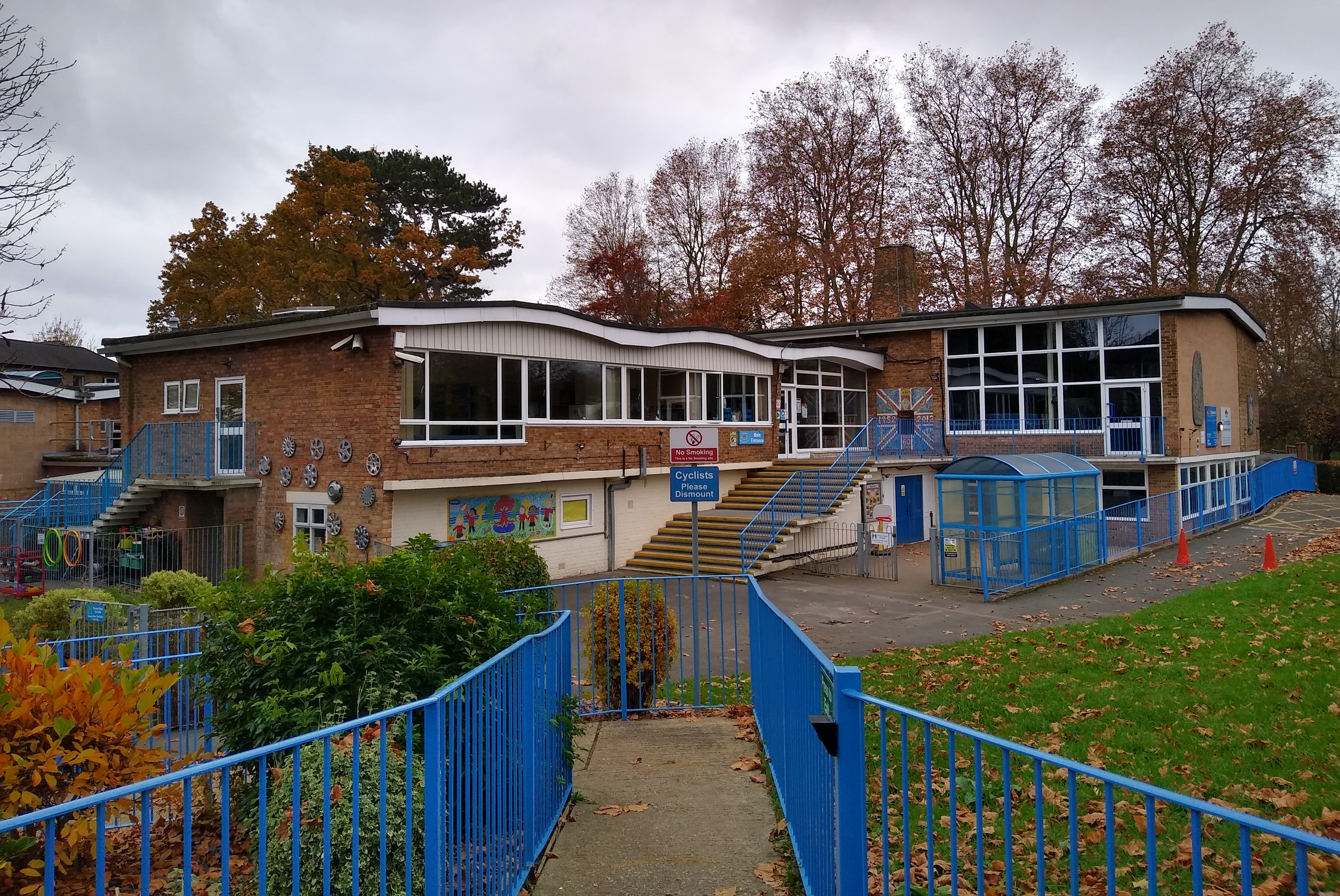
Cavendish Primary School

This is a list of schools in the London Borough of Hounslow, England.

== State-funded schools ==
=== Primary schools ===
- Alexandra Primary School
- Beavers Community Primary School
- Bedfont Primary School
- Belmont Primary School
- Berkeley Academy
- The Blue CE Primary School
- Cardinal Road Infant School
- Cavendish Primary School
- Chatsworth Primary School
- Crane Park Primary School
- Cranford Primary School
- Edison Primary School
- Edward Pauling Primary School
- Fairholme Primary School
- Feltham Hill Infant School
- Green Dragon Primary School
- Grove Park Primary School
- Grove Road Primary School
- Heston Primary School
- Hounslow Heath Infant School
- Hounslow Heath Junior School
- Hounslow Town Primary School
- Isleworth Town Primary School
- Ivybridge Primary School
- Lionel Primary School
- Marlborough Primary School
- Nishkam School West London
- Norwood Green Infant School
- Norwood Green Junior School
- Oak Hill Academy
- Orchard Primary School
- Oriel Academy West London
- Our Lady & St John's RC Primary School
- Reach Academy Feltham
- The Rosary RC Primary School
- St Lawrence RC Primary School
- St Mary's RC Primary School, Chiswick
- St Mary's RC Primary School, Isleworth
- St Michael & St Martin RC Primary School
- St Paul's CE Primary School
- St Richard's CE Primary School
- The Smallberry Green Primary School
- Southville Primary School
- Sparrow Farm Primary School
- Spring Grove Primary School
- Springwell School
- Strand-on-the-Green Infant and Nursery School
- Strand-on-the-Green Junior School
- Victoria Junior School
- Wellington Primary School
- Westbrook Primary School
- The William Hogarth Primary School
- Worple Primary School

=== Secondary schools ===
- Bolder Academy
- Brentford School for Girls (girls)
- Chiswick School
- Cranford Community College
- The Green School for Boys (boys)
- The Green School for Girls (girls)
- Gumley House Convent School (girls, RC)
- Gunnersbury Boys' School (boys, RC)
- The Heathland School
- Heston Community School
- Isleworth and Syon School (boys)
- Kingsley Academy
- Lampton School
- Logic Studio School
- Nishkam School West London
- Reach Academy Feltham
- Reach Academy Hanworth Park
- Rivers Academy West London
- St Mark's Catholic School
- Space Studio West London
- Springwest Academy

=== Special and alternative schools ===
- The Cedars Primary School
- Lindon Bennett School
- Marjory Kinnon School
- Oaklands School
- The Rise Free School
- The Woodbridge Park Education Service

=== Further education ===
- West Thames College

== Independent schools ==
=== Primary and preparatory schools ===
- Ashton House School
- Chiswick and Bedford Park Preparatory School
- The Falcons Pre Preparatory School for Boys
- Heathfield House School
- Suffah Primary School
- Tarbiyyah Primary School
- Unique Academy

=== Senior and all-through schools ===
- Arts Educational School
- International School of London
- Kew House
- Oak Heights Independent School
- The St Michael Steiner School

=== Special and alternative schools ===
- Eagle Park Independent School
