= Heston (disambiguation) =

Heston is a suburb of London, England.

Heston may also refer to:

- Heston (name), a list of people with the surname or given name
- Heston Aerodrome, a London airfield closed after the Second World War
- Heston Community School, London, a secondary school
- Heston Aircraft Company Ltd, manufacturer and modifier of aircraft (1934–1948)
- Heston Rovers F.C., a Scottish football club
- Heston Airlines, a Lithuanian charter airline company

== See also ==
- Heston model, a stochastic volatility model used in mathematical finance
- Hesston (disambiguation)
- Hestan Island, Scotland
