= Fiat Trattori =

Tractor manufacturer of Italy

FIAT Trattori
- Type: Public
- Industry: Agricultural machinery
- Founded: 1918
- Defunct: 1993
- Fate: Merged
- Headquarters: Turin, Italy
- Products: Tractors, Combines

FIAT Trattori S.p.A. was a FIAT group company founded in 1919 that was a constructor of agricultural equipment, tractors in particular. Over its decades of history, it established itself as Italy's leading constructor and one of the biggest in Europe; in 1991, it took over Ford-New Holland and adopted its name to increase its status on the world markets. In 1999, New Holland acquired Case Corporation to create CNH Global, in which FIAT Industrial was the majority shareholder until the two firms merged to create CNH Industrial in 2013.

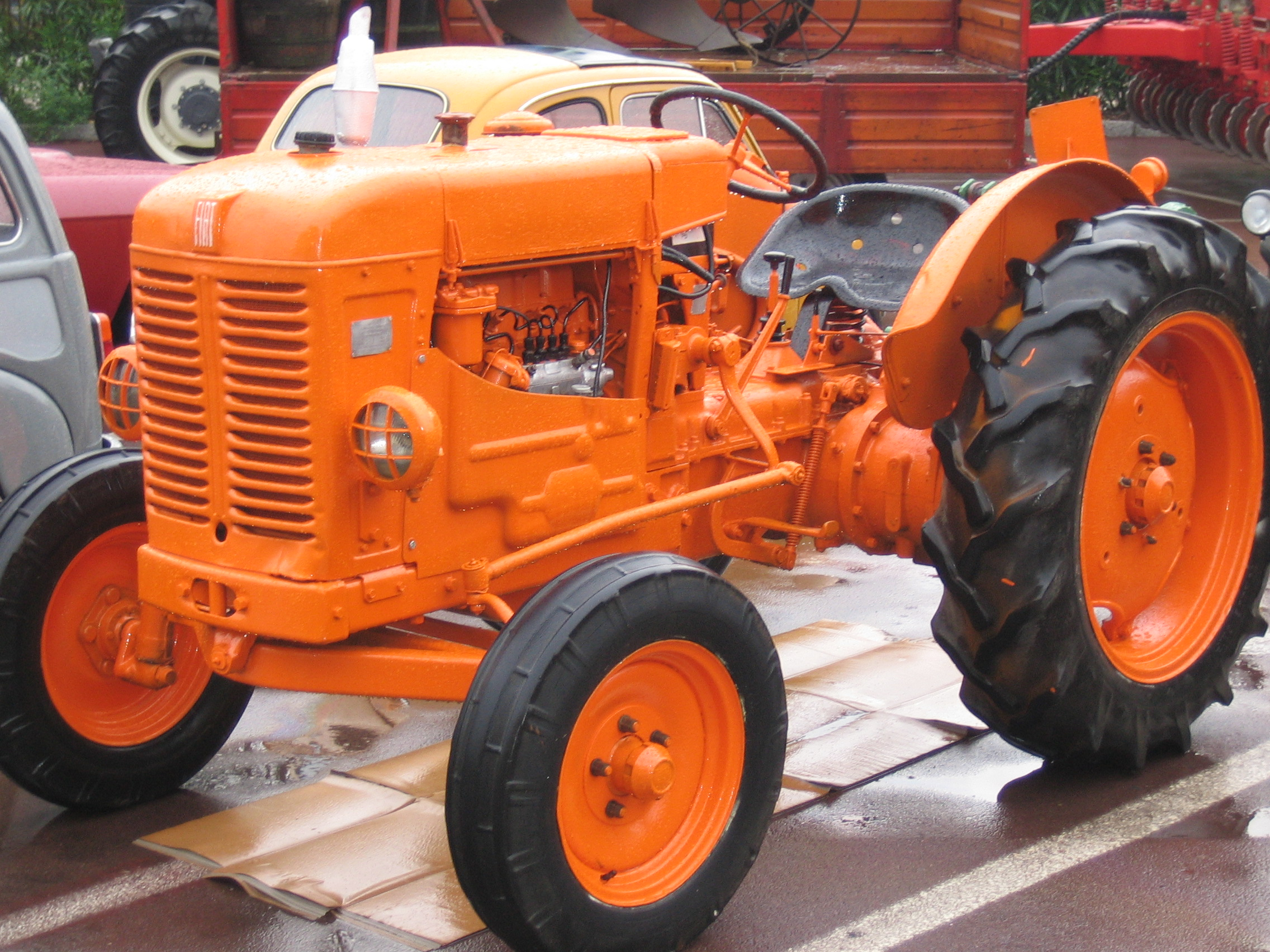
FIAT 25R tractor

== History ==
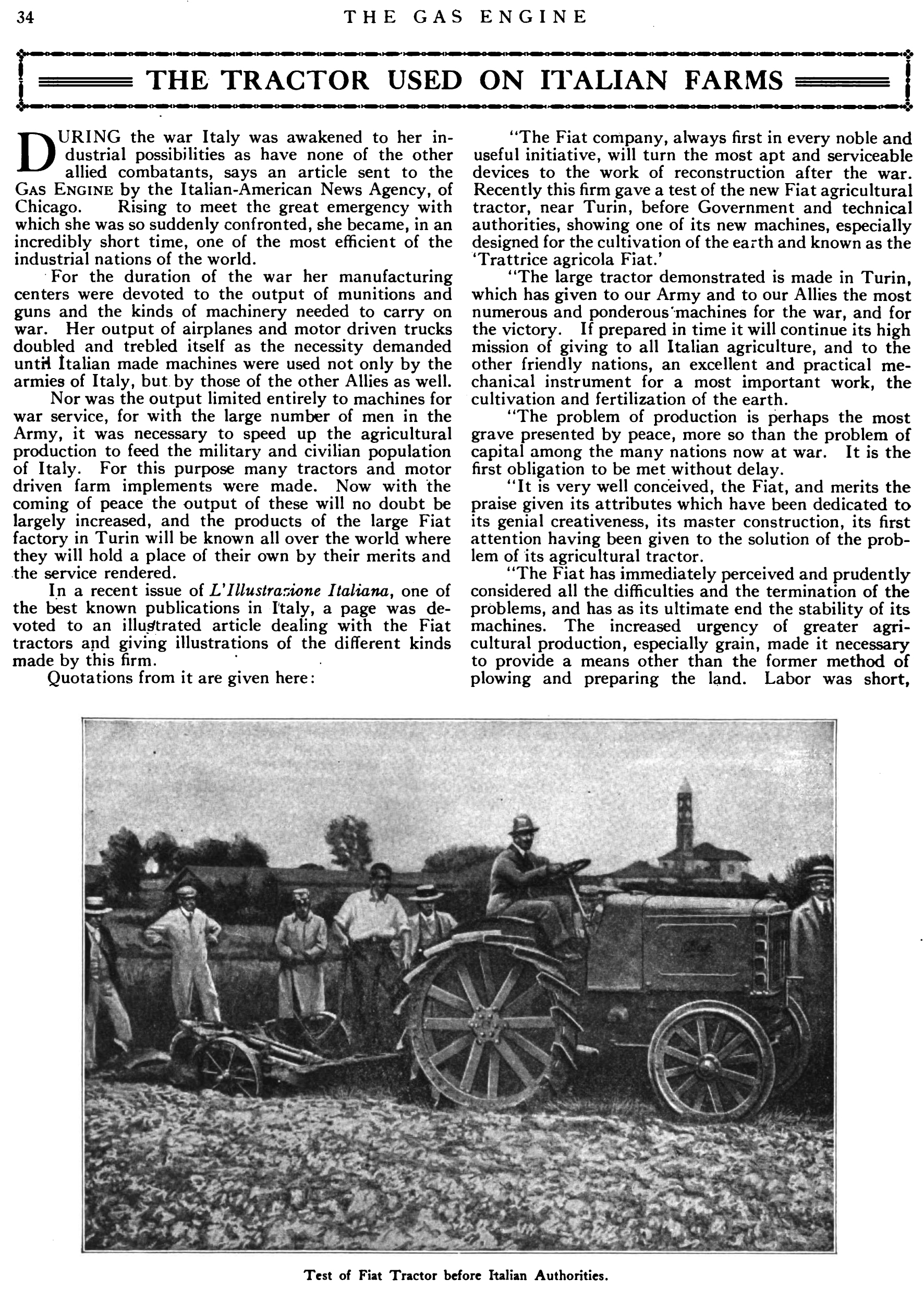
An article about Italian industry, including FIAT Tractors, in the January 1919 issue of The Gas Engine Monthly Magazine (Cincinnati, Ohio, USA)

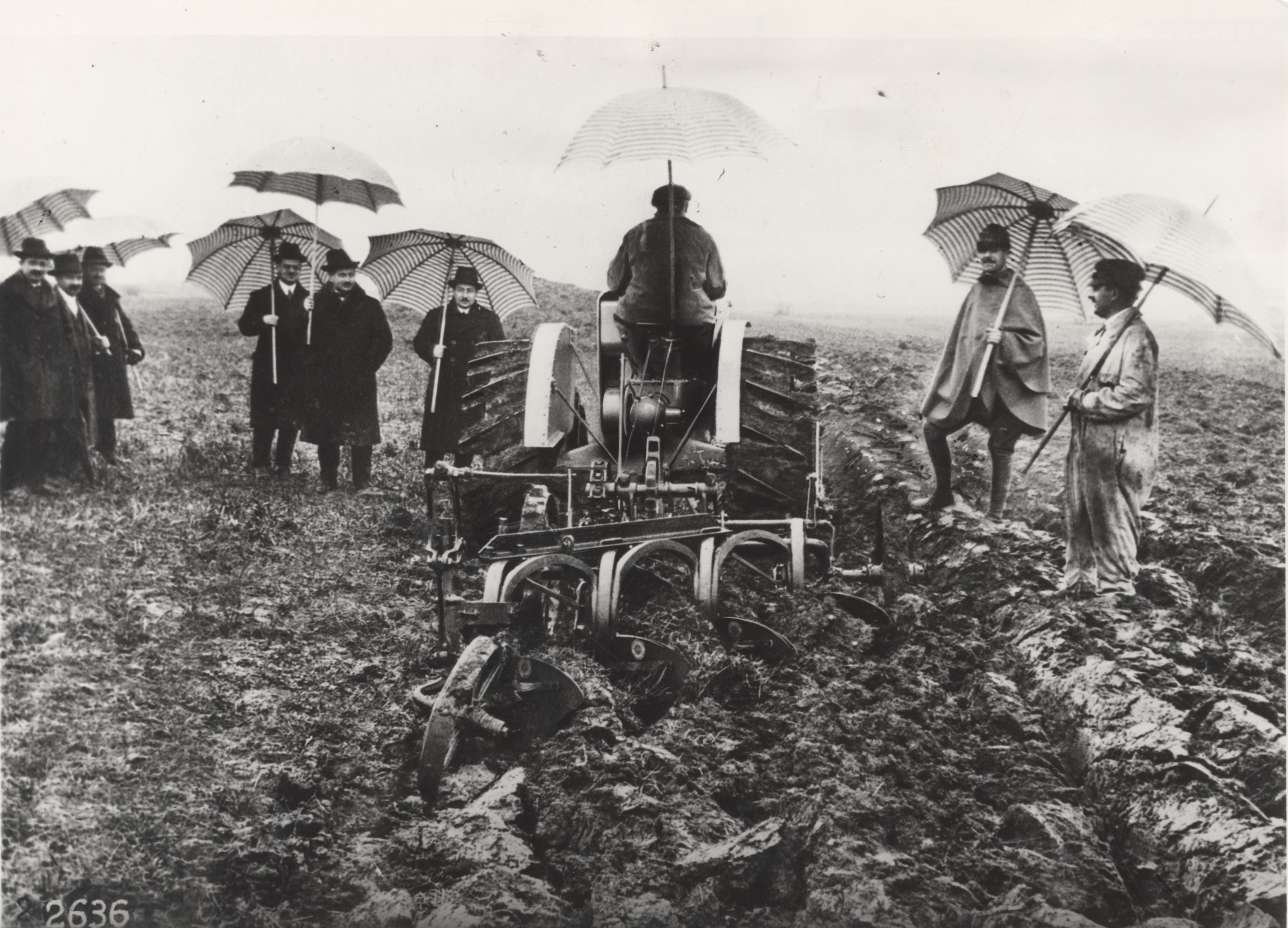
FIAT 702 in 1919

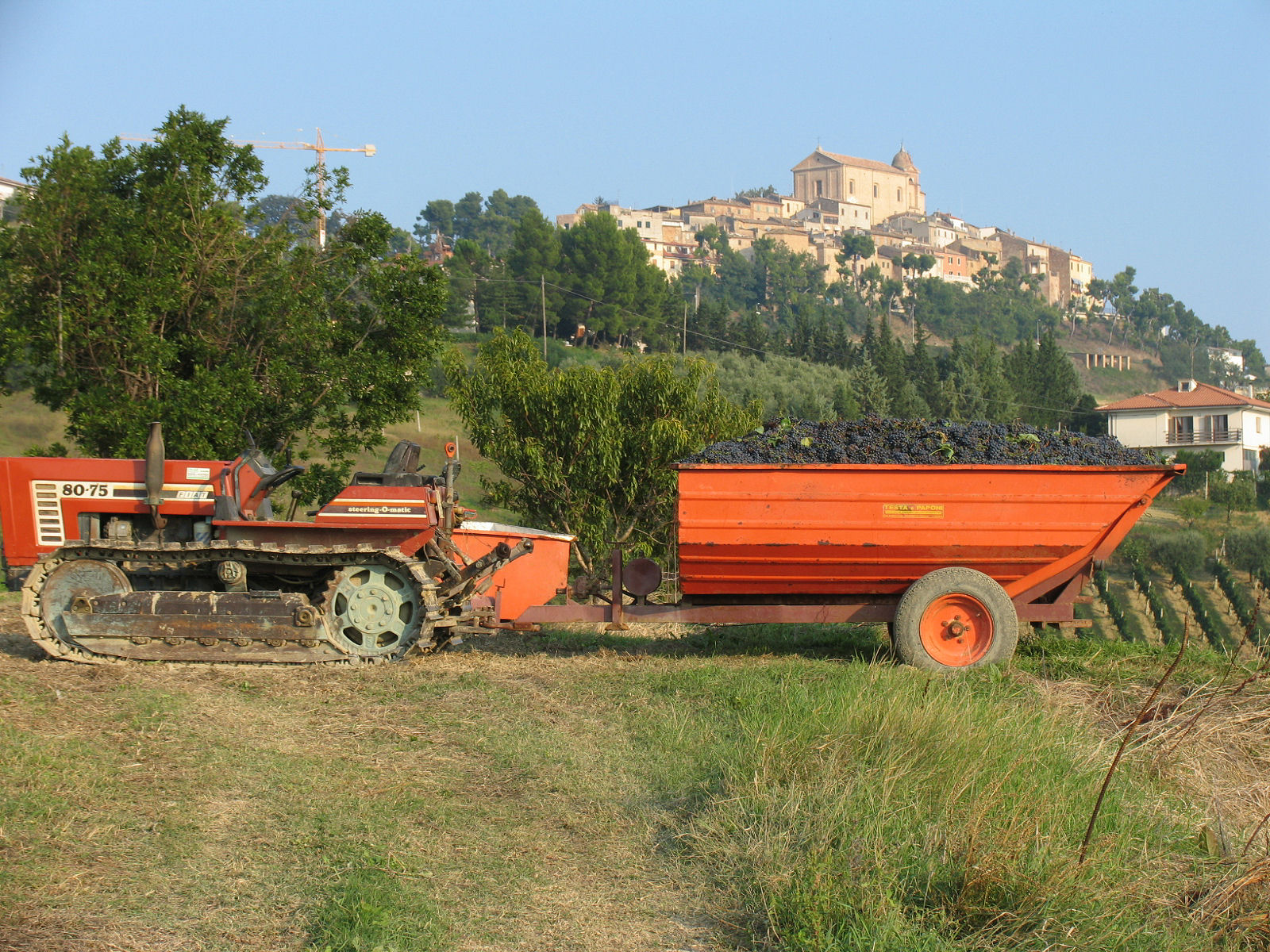
FIAT Agri 80-75 crawler tractor

=== Origins ===
The history of FIAT Trattori began in 1918 when it launched its first tractor, the FIAT 702, which had 30 horsepower (22 kW). The model 702 was followed by the 702A, B, and BN variants, and then the 703B and 703BN. With these variants, in production until 1925, FIAT Trattori reached the milestone of the 2,000 units produced.

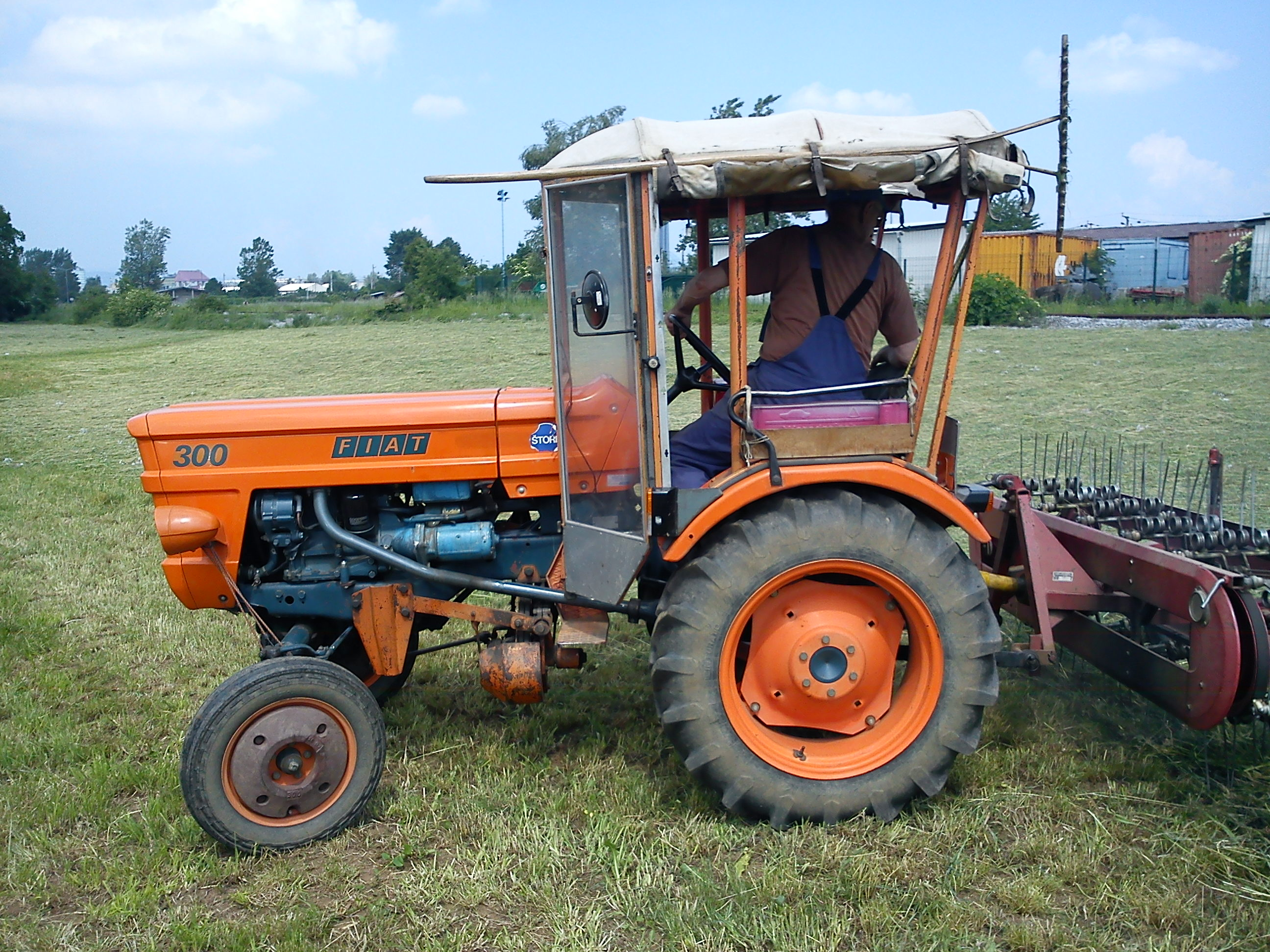
FIAT 300 of production years 1971–1978

In 1929, the plant was selling more than 1,000 tractors a year.

In 1932, it launched the first European crawler tractor, the FIAT 700C. In the same year, tractor production was transferred from Turin to Modena, where Officine Costruzioni Industriali (OCI) was founded. The first tractor produced at the new plant was the 702C with 28 hp (21 kW) instead of 35 (26), much lighter than the previous version. This tractor remained in production until 1950, with 4,000 units produced.

At the Modena plant, FIAT produced the FIAT 700C crawler tractor, offering impressive traction capacity due to the tracks, which prevented it from sinking into wet ground.

In 1933, FIAT took over Società Anonima Officine Meccaniche (OM), which produced both industrial vehicles and tractors.

In 1939, the Modena plant launched the first mass-produced tractor, the FIAT 40 Boghetto; because of an invention by Fortunato Boghetto, this tractor's engine was able to operate on a variety of fuels (kerosene, diesel, alcohol, petrol, natural gas, and gasifier gas).

In 1944, production at the Modena plant was halted by the lack of raw materials and the German occupation, leading to its conversion for the repair and overhaul of military vehicles. Against this backdrop, Chief Design Engineer Edmondo Tascheri began work on the design of a new crawler tractor, to be more modern than the now obsolete Series 40 Boghetto, with the aid of a few photographs of a Russian tractor brought back from the Soviet front by some workmen. Assisted by the connivance of collaborators, the Technical Department started to build a secret prototype unbeknown to the German controllers. The resulting Fiat 50 crawler tractor was produced after the Second World War, starting in 1946, thanks in part to the recovery of the machine tools the German occupiers had attempted to ship to Germany before their plans were thwarted by the Allied bombing raids.

=== Postwar years ===
In the postwar years (1949), the FIAT-OCI plant in Modena began production of the FIAT 600 and the crawler FIAT 601, featuring the use of levers instead of a steering wheel. With these tractors, sales soared, generating output of 1,832 vehicles a year.

In the early 1950s, FIAT established an alliance with the French company SIMCA, which began to manufacture FIAT cars and then tractors SOMECA to FIAT designs.

The launch of the FIAT 25R in 1951 became one of the key machines in FIAT's history. The innovative tractor, colored orange helped FIAT enter into the European agricultural market. Produced in a number of models, operating on diesel, wheel or crawler, narrow and industrial, in orchard and forestry versions, almost 45,000 units of this machine were launched onto the market.

The next year had the launch of the high-power FIAT-OM tractors. The best-seller was the OM 35-40 model, also produced in crawler version.

The FIAT 60 crawler tractor, replacing the old FIAT 50 models, was launched in 1956. With this tractor, FIAT established itself as the world's leading constructor of crawler tractors.

In 1957, FIAT launched the biggest-selling tractor of the 1950s, the "little" FIAT 18.

In 1959, the successor to the Series 18 appeared, the Series 200, produced until 1965. The 211 R model was equipped with a 1135 cc, two-cylinder FIAT 615 diesel engine, developing 21 hp (16 kW) at 2200 rpm. The 211 Rb model had a 1221 cc, four-cylinder FIAT 103 petrol engine and generated 22 hp (16 kW) at 2300 rpm. This tractor was suitable for work on small fields, with a gearbox offering six forward and two reverse speeds, a top speed of 20 km/h (12 mph), and total weight of just 900 kg (2,000 lb).

In 1957, FIAT's tractor output passed the 100,000 unit mark. The following year had the launch of the FIAT 411 tractor; 1962 contained the appearance of the new "Diamante series", which firmly consolidated the Italian constructor's position in Europe. The "diamante" series included the 215, 315, 415, and 615 models, as well as the 715 model under the OM logo. These models were the first tractors to have synchronised speeds, differential lock, and the AMPLICUPLE device, automatically engaged by means of a lever on the driver's left. It was only available on the 415, 615, and 715 models, which permanently established FIAT's position in Europe.

In the early 1960s, under the OM brand, the company produced the OM 512, OM 513, and OM 615 models in a number of variants, and in the 1970s, these were followed by the OM 750 and OM 850 models.

In 1967, the "Nastro d'Oro" (gold stripe) series was to be a success in terms of technology, performance, fuel consumption, and reliability, and bring the Italian firm lasting success at the European level.

In 1968, FIAT introduced the 250, 450, and 550, as well as the 650 and 850 models under the OM logo. They were followed by the 1000 and 1300 (FIAT); with these models, FIAT targeted the European market, and almost 10 years later, it became the leader in Europe with the Series 80.

In the early 1970s, the range underwent a change and the 250 model became the 300 model, the special 350 was launched, and the 480 and 500 models replaced the 450 model, before evolving into the 540 Special. Also in the 1970s, when the 80 Series had already appeared, the 850 became the FIAT 850 Super, with an increase in power to 95 hp (71 kW); the 1000 received the same treatment (super), with a boost to 110 hp (82 kW); the super 1300 increased to 150 hp (110 kW).

=== From the 1970s to the 1990s ===
In 1975, FIAT Trattori S/p/A/ acquired 20% of Laverda S.p.A., founded by Pietro Laverda in 1873, a company that has specialised in combines since its founding. The mid-1970s also had the launch of the FIAT 80 series with the models FIAT 580, FIAT 680, FIAT 780, FIAT 880, FIAT 880\5 (five-cylinder), FIAT 980, FIAT 1180, FIAT 1280, FIAT 1380, FIAT 1580, and top-of-the-range FIAT 1880. These tractors were the first in the world to have a platform mounted on silent blocks and a cab styled as one with the tractor, designed by Pininfarina. In 1976, FIAT Trattori's output exceeded 86,000 tractors and no fewer than 50,000 units were exported, compared to the 15,488 in 1955.

During the late 1970s and early 1980s, it imported into Italy a number of low-cost models produced in Argentina under the FIAT Concord logo: the 500, 650, 600E/E DT/F, 700E, 800, 900E, 1100E and 1100E DT.

With the expansion of mechanisation, some agricultural machines also began to be used in the construction industry. The FIAT 70C, 80C, 90C, and 100C models, used for ploughing, received just a few structural changes to become the AD3, AD4, AD5, AD6, AD7, AD9, AD1O, AD12, AD14, AD18, and AD20 crawler loaders. In 1974, FIAT joined forces with American Allis-Chalmers company to create FIAT-Allis to manufacture a line of crawler machines produced in Brazil, the United States, and Italy, wheel backhoe-loaders (US and United Kingdom), excavators (Italy and Brazil), and graders and dozers (US).

In the mid-1990s, FIAT formed an alliance with Hitachi to produce construction equipment under the FIAT-Hitachi name. FIAT-Allis continued to sell under its brand in Latin America.

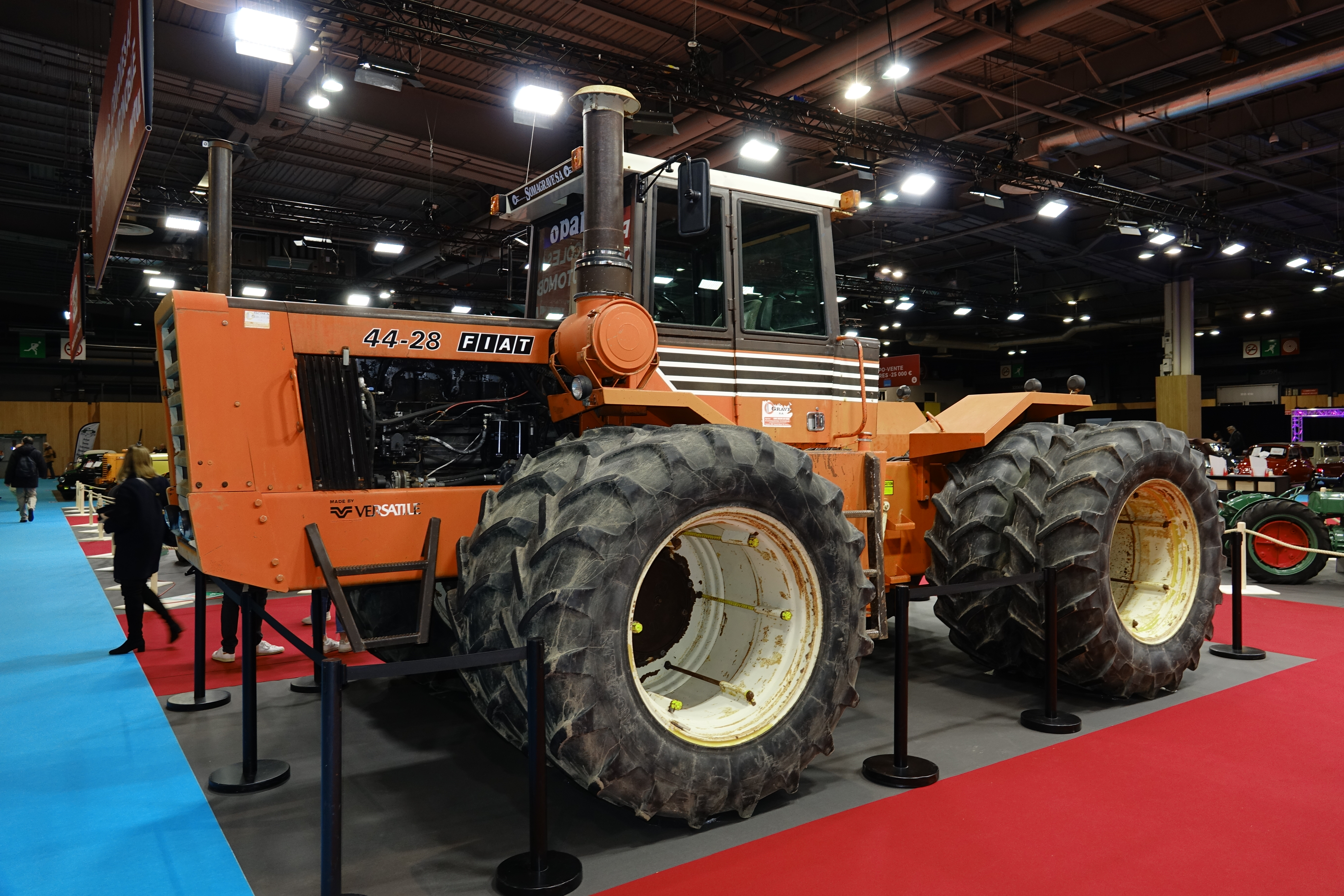
FIAT 44-28, 280 hp

From 1979 to 1983, FIAT produced high-power tractors under an agreement with the Canadian company Versatile. This led to the birth of the "FIAT-Versatile 44 Series": 44-23, 44-28, 44-33, 44-35 of 230 (170), 280 (210), 330 (250) and 350 hp (260 kW), sold under the FIAT brand in Europe and the Versatile name in the US, Mexico, and Australia.

In 1977, FIAT Trattori's output since its origins exceeded 1,200,000 tractors.

In 1981, FIAT took over Laverda S.p.A. and started the production of combines for FIAT Trattori.

In 1982, FIAT launched the new "66 Series" with models from 45 to 80 hp (34 to 60 kW), known as the "daily" tractors, because they were able to perform any everyday task on small and medium farms. This series was also sold under the Hesston brand in the US and then also with the Ford and then the New Holland names until 2003.

In 1977, FIAT took over Hesston, the American leader in forage equipment, Braud, the leading producer of grape harvesters, and the Italian firm Agrifull, a specialist in small-sized tractors. FIAT Trattori thus became FIATAgri and changed its livery from orange to burgundy, used on all new tractors. With the acquisition of Hesston and Braud, FIATAgri also started to produce forage machinery (balers, forage harvesters) and grape-harvesting equipment. The Hesston and Braud logos continued to appear on the sides of their agricultural machines.

== From FIATGEOTECH to NHGEOTECH ==
FIAT Trattori was to disappear, superseded by the holding company FIAT GEOTECH based in Modena, owner of the FIATAGRI group and FIAT-Allis.

In 1984, FIAT Agri launched its historic "90 Series", which replaced the 80 series with a large number of models subdivided into two categories: medium-low (55-90, 60-90, 65-90, 70-90, 80-90, 85-90 Turbo) and high-powered (115-90, 130-90 Turbo, 140-90 Turbo, 160-90 Turbo, 180-90 Turbo), driven by the new FIAT-IVECO 8000 Series propulsion units. The 90 series was also sold under the Agrifull and Ford names, and then also as New Holland until 2003 on the European market; 1984 also had FIAT Agri take over the French company Braud.

Since 1985, the company had also been producing the 90 series, known as the "bridge" series, with the 90-90, 100-90 and 110-90 models. These tractors were constructed until around 1996, when they were replaced by the new L series under the New Holland name.

In 1986, FIAT Agri transferred some of its tractor production from Modena to Jesi. In the same year, the company also launched the FIAT Agri 180-55 crawler tractor, with a revolutionary hydrostatic transmission system.

In 1990/91, the company launched the first "Winner series", consisting of four models: the FIAT F100, F110, F120, and F130 Turbo. The second series, launched in 193, comprised the F100 and F115 and the two turbo models, the F130 and F140. These series remained in production until 1996.

In 1992, the 75 series crawler tractors received a new steering system called the "Steering-o-matic", using a joystick instead of the steering clutches.

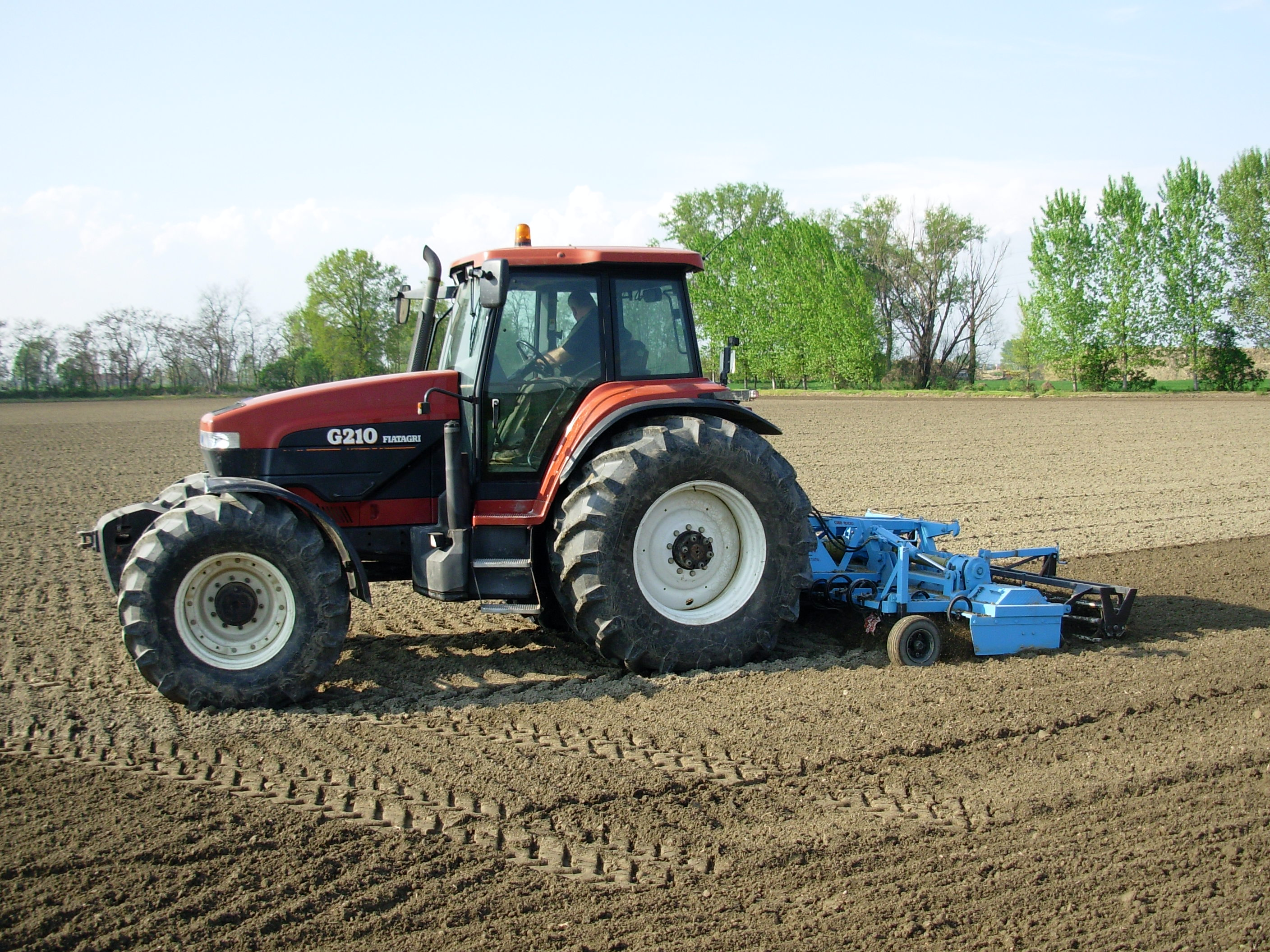
FIAT Agri G.210 tractor

The Winner series was followed by the launch of the "G" models designed for large fields and large tilling applications and the M Series, with the M100, 115, 135, and 160 models. The "G" series belonged to the product line of Versatile, a North American company that was already co-operating with FIAT on large-sized machines under the Hesston brand. The G series was presented at the "Fiera del Levante" exhibition in Bari in 1993; its styling was similar to Ford-New Holland machines and the FIAT Agri logo appeared in blue instead of red. A few months later, FIAT Agri S.p.A. took over Ford-New Holland which a few years earlier had itself acquired a combine and forage equipment specialist, New Holland Inc.

In 1993, the holding company changed its name from FIAT GEOTCH to NH GEOTECH, but the machines were still sold under their own brands and with the relative liveries: FIAT Agri, Ford-New Holland, Hesston, Braud, Laverda, etc.

In 1999, the FIAT Agri and Ford-New Holland brands, and all the lesser brands, disappeared to make way for simply New Holland, but the three brands' heritage has not been forgotten; FIAT Agri is recalled in the leaf symbol, Ford-New Holland in the blue tractor livery and New Holland in the yellow combine and forage harvester livery and of course in name.
