= Heaston =

Heaston is a surname. Notable people with the surname include:

- Kristin Heaston (born 1975), American shot putter
- Liz Heaston (born 1977), American optometrist and former college football and soccer player
- Nicole Heaston, American soprano

== See also ==
- Heston (name)
