= Braud =

Braud may refer to:

== People ==
- François Braud (b. 1986), French Nordic combined skier
- Martin Braud (b. 1982), French slalom canoer
- Pascal Braud (b. 1968), French footballer
- Wellman Braud (1891–1966), American jazz musician

== Economy ==
- Braud, Grape Harvester French manufacturer

== Geography ==
- Braud-et-Saint-Louis, commune in the Gironde department in Aquitaine in southwestern France
