= Francis D. Lee (Nebraska politician) =

American politician (1911–1980)

Member of the Nebraska Legislature from the 42nd district
- In office July 21, 1966 – January 3, 1967
- Preceded by: Frank Nelson
- Succeeded by: William M. Wylie

Personal details
- Born: September 14, 1911 Spalding, Nebraska
- Died: February 12, 1980 (aged 68) Hesston, Pennsylvania
- Party: Democratic
- Spouse: Vivian Ellen Connelly
- Children: 9 (Patrick, Judith, William, Daniel, Micaela, Joan, Timothy, Gerard, Mark)
- Education: University of Nebraska, Creighton University School of Law (LL.B.)
- Occupation: Attorney

Francis D. Lee (September 14, 1911 – February 12, 1980) was a Democratic politician from Nebraska and attorney who briefly served as a member of the Nebraska Legislature from the 42nd district from 1966 to 1967. He was the 1952 Democratic nominee for Congress in Nebraska's 4th congressional district.

== Early life ==
Lee was born in Spalding, Nebraska, in 1911, and attended the University of Nebraska, ultimately graduating from the Creighton University School of Law with his bachelor of laws degree. While a student at Creighton University, he ran on the men's track team. Following graduation, Lee worked as an attorney for the Federal Land Bank of Omaha, established a legal practice in Stuart, and moved to Atkinson in 1941.

In 1950, Lee ran for Mayor of Atkinson, challenging incumbent W. J. Douglas. He defeated Douglas, receiving 223 votes to Douglas's 164 votes, and winning all three wards of the city. He declined to seek another term as mayor in 1954.

== 1952 congressional campaign ==
Lee ran for Congress in 1952, challenging Republican Congressman Arthur L. Miller for re-election in the 4th district. Lee won the Democratic primary unopposed, but lost to Miller in a landslide, receiving 27 percent of the vote to Miller's 73 percent.

== Nebraska Legislature ==
In 1966, following the death of State Senator Frank Nelson, Governor Frank B. Morrison appointed Lee to serve out the remaining months of Nelson's term in the 42nd district. He was sworn in on July 21, 1966. Lee did not contest the seat in the 1966 election.

== Death ==
Lee and his wife relocated to Hesston, Pennsylvania, in the late 1970s, and he died on February 12, 1980.
