= Asa Whitney (canal commissioner) =

Asa Whitney (December 1, 1791 Townsend, Massachusetts – June 4, 1874 Philadelphia, Pennsylvania) was an American manufacturer, inventor, railroad executive and politician.

== Life ==
He became a blacksmith like his father. In 1812, he moved to New Hampshire. After a short time, his employer sent him to Brownsville, New York, to supervise the installation of machinery at a cotton factory, and Whitney remained in New York. About 1830, he was hired by the Mohawk and Hudson Railroad to make machinery and railway carriages, and after a few years became superintendent of the line.

In February 1840, he was elected by the New York State Legislature as one of the Erie Canal commissioners, and remained in office until 1842 when the Democratic majority removed the Whig commissioners.

In 1842, he formed a partnership with Matthias W. Baldwin to manufacture steam locomotives in Philadelphia. Two years later he left Baldwin, and worked for the reorganized Morris Canal Company. In 1846, he opened his own factory to manufacture wheels for railway carriages. In 1847, he took out patents for the corrugated-plate carriage wheel and the curved corrugated-plate carriage wheel, and the following year for the process of annealing carriage wheels. This consisted of placing the wheels, soon after they were cast, in a heated furnace, where they were subjected to a further gradual increase of temperature, and were then slowly cooled for three days. The discovery of this process of annealing, as applied to chilled cast-iron wheels, marked an era in the history of railroads. It enabled trains to safely increase both loads and speed. Previous to this discovery it was impossible to cast wheels with solid hubs, and therefore impossible to secure them rigidly to the axle. Now the whole wheel was easily cast in one piece, and capable of being forced securely upon the axle at a pressure of 40 tons. In 1850, he patented the tapered and ribbed corrugated wheel.

Whitney was for a short time president of the Philadelphia and Reading Railroad, but retired in 1861 because of ill health. He gave $50,000 to found a professorship of dynamical engineering in the University of Pennsylvania, $12,500 to the Franklin Institute, and $20,000 to the old men's home in Philadelphia.

He died in Philadelphia and is interred at The Woodlands Cemetery.

After Whitney's death, the factory, which had been once the largest carriage-wheel manufacturer in the United States, was taken over by his three sons: George Whitney (1819-1885), John Randall Whitney (1828-1909), and James Shields Whitney (1830-1921). In 1891, the company was in financial trouble and going bankrupt.

== Sources ==
- White, John H. (1985) [1978]. The American Railroad Passenger Car. Vol. 2. Baltimore, Maryland: Johns Hopkins University Press. p. 656. ISBN 978-0-8018-2747-1.
- Franklin Benjamin Hough, comp., The New York Civil List Weed, Parsons and Co., 1858, p. 42.
- "A. Whitney & Sons Fail", New York Times, March 26, 1891

Attribution
