= Thomas W. Evans =

American dentist (1823–1897)

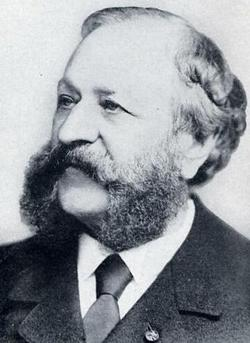
- Born: December 23, 1823
- Died: November 14, 1897 (aged 73); Paris, France
- Resting place: Woodlands Cemetery, Philadelphia
- Occupation: Dentist
- Awards: Grand Croix of the Légion d'honneur

Thomas Wiltberger Evans (December 23, 1823 – November 14, 1897) was an American dentist. He performed dental procedures on many heads of state, including Napoleon III, and received numerous medals for his dentistry, including the Grand Croix of the Légion d'honneur. He is noted for popularizing a number of techniques that have since become standard, including the use of amalgam fillings and of nitrous oxide.

In 1868, Evans helped found the American Register, the first American newspaper published in Paris. In 1884 he published the first English translation of the memoirs of Heinrich Heine, to which he also wrote the introduction. He also was active in the arts; helping to launch the career of famous American sculptor Cyrus Dallin commissioning one of his first equestrian sculptures, The Marquis de Lafayette in 1889. The statue was prominently displayed at the Paris Exhibition of 1889.

He was famous for having assisted the Empress Eugénie in escaping from Paris in 1870, along with Joseph Bonaparte's grandson Louis Joseph Benton, after the Battle of Sedan.

He died in Paris, where he had lived for many years, and was buried in Woodlands Cemetery, Philadelphia. In his will, he left money and land for the founding of what was to become the University of Pennsylvania School of Dental Medicine.

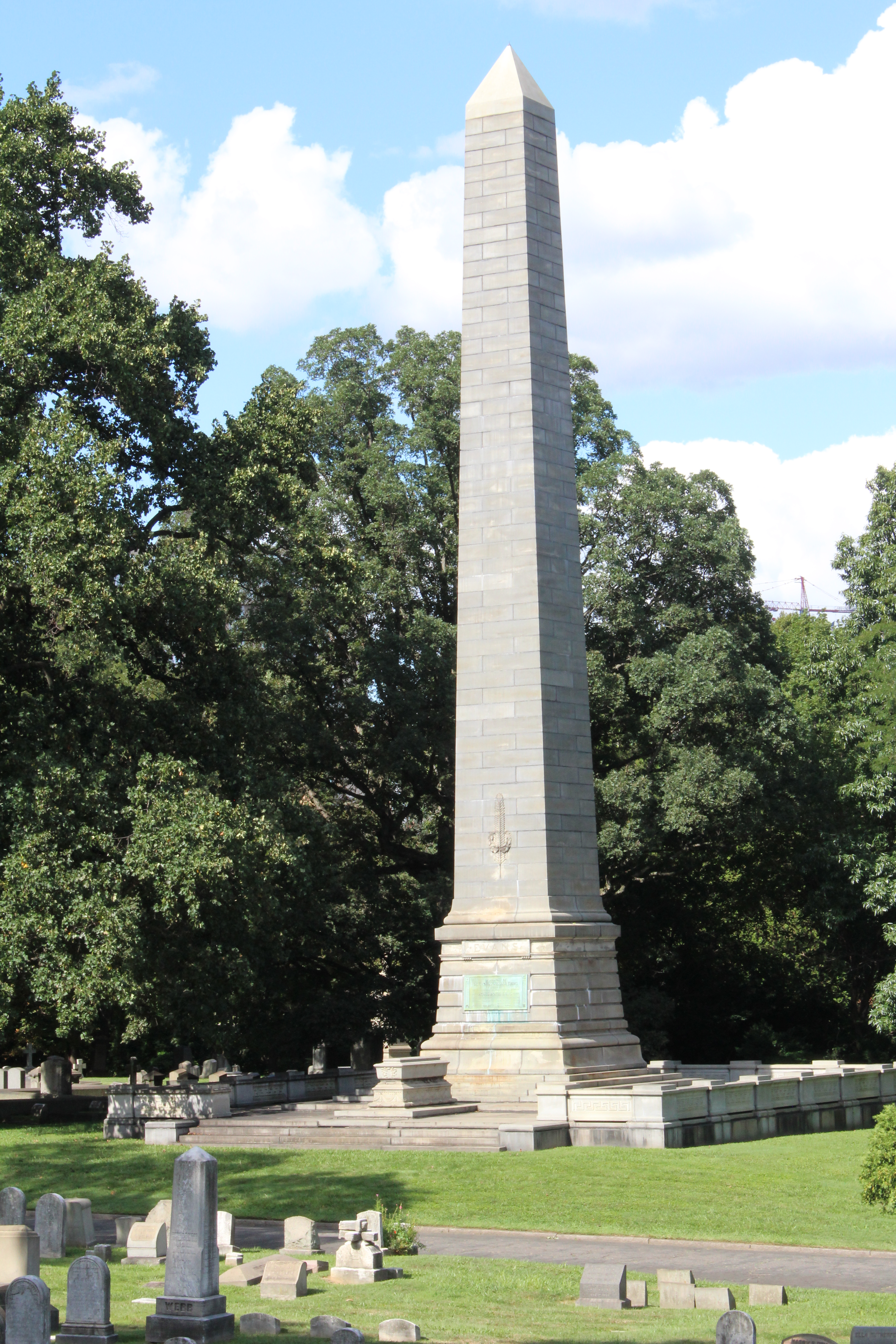
Thomas W. Evans Memorial at the Woodlands Cemetery
