= Fiatallis =

Former construction machinery manufacturer

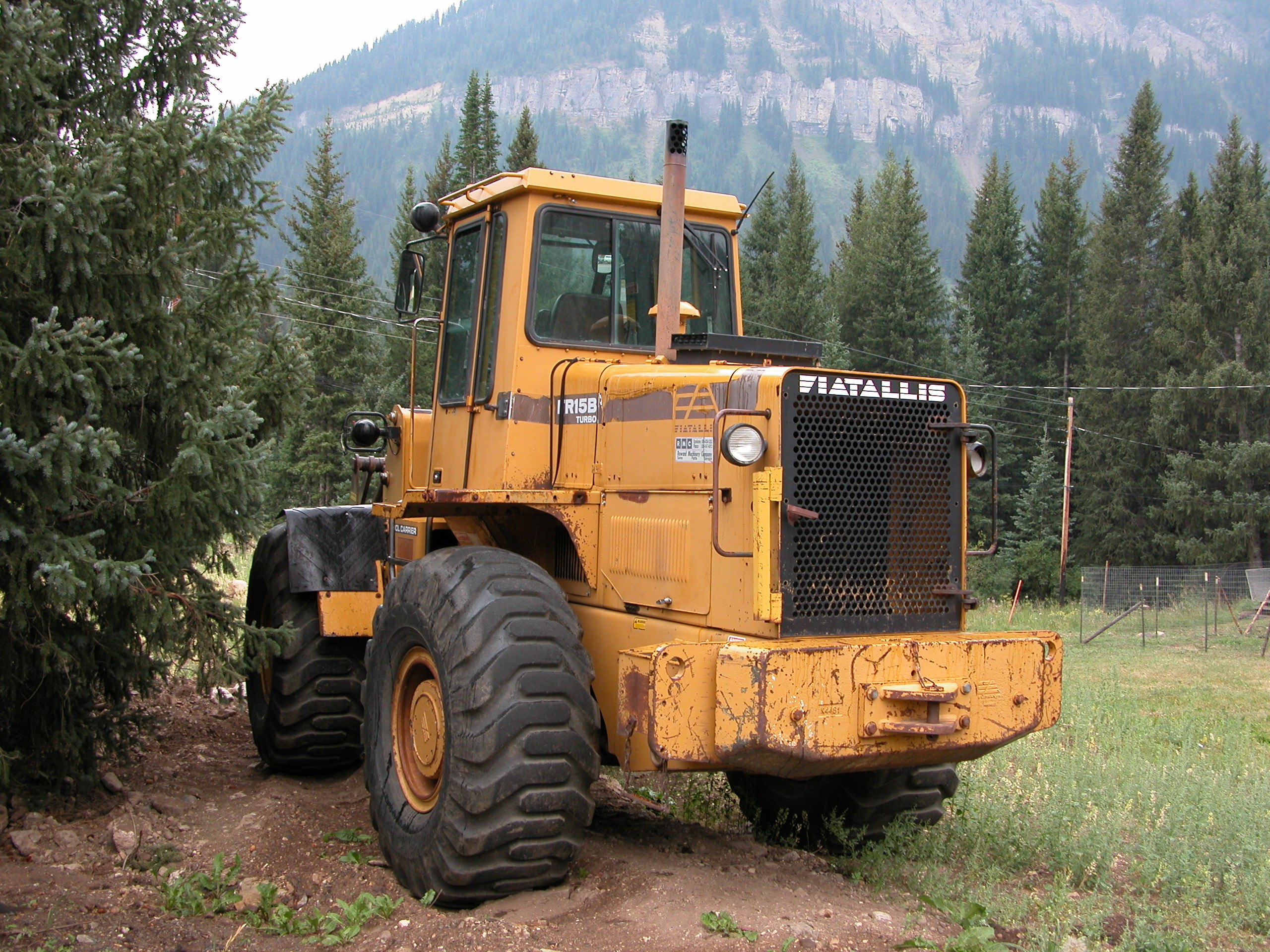
A Fiatallis FR15B wheel loader in Montana, 2003

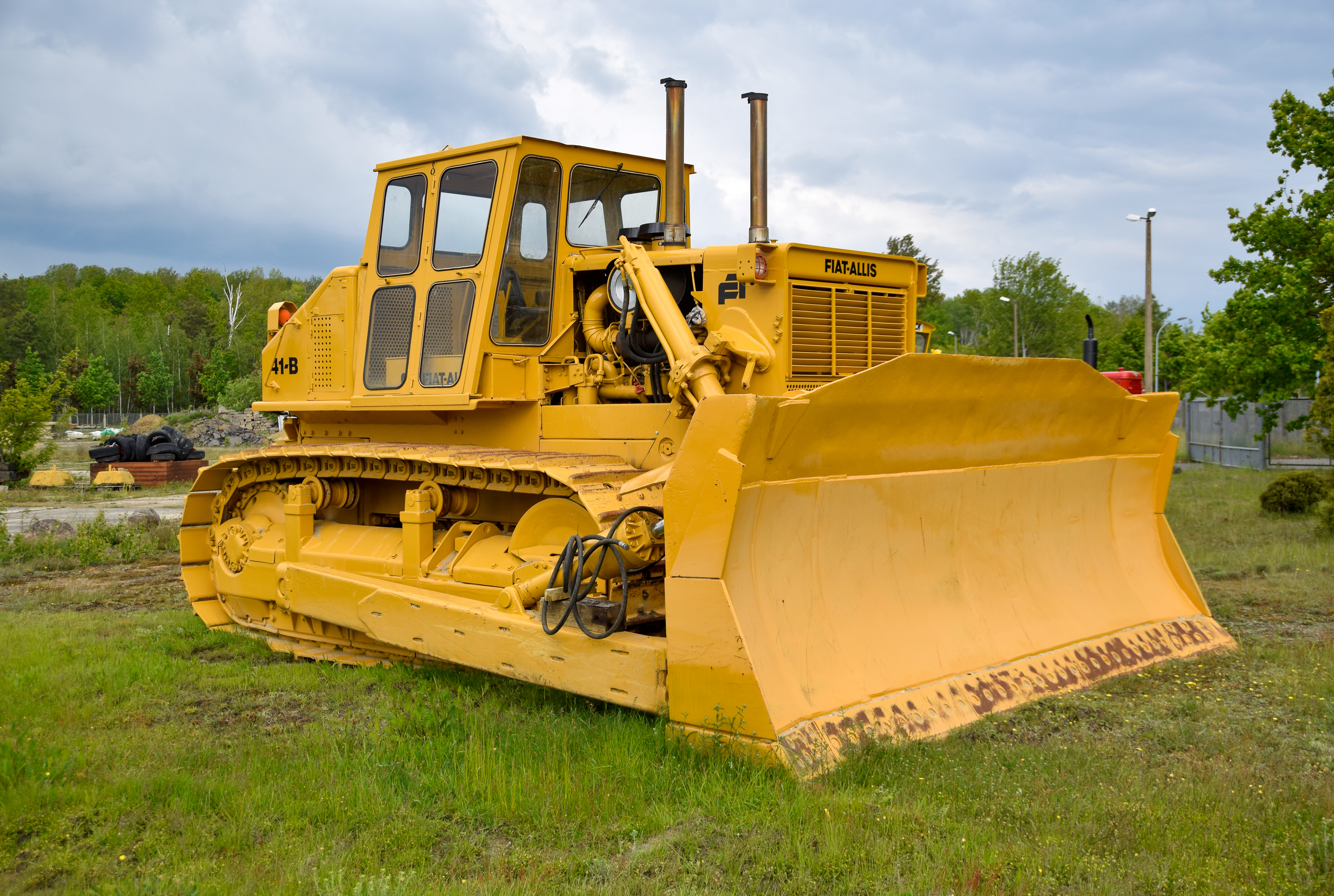
A Fiatallis 41-B bulldozer

Fiatallis (1983 to early 2000s, Fiat-Allis 1974 to 1982), was a brand of heavy equipment (also called construction equipment, earthmoving equipment, or engineering vehicles), such as loaders, bulldozers, backhoes, scrapers, and graders. It began in January 1974, when Allis-Chalmers's construction equipment business was reorganized into a joint venture with Fiat SpA, which bought a 65% majority stake at the outset.

Allis-Chalmers's construction equipment business was often unprofitable during the 1950s and 1960s. It faced stiff competition from companies such as Caterpillar, Case, International Harvester, Euclid, John Deere, Fiat MMT, and several others. The 1974 formation of a new company, Fiat-Allis Construction Machinery Inc., was essentially a divestment for Allis-Chalmers so that capital could be redirected to their other more profitable divisions.

In December 1980, Fiat-Allis Construction Machinery Inc. announced they would be closing the former Tractomotive wheel loader factory in Deerfield, Illinois, and transferring all wheel loader and grader production to their Springfield, Illinois, factory.

In 1983, the company was renamed Fiatallis with a new corporate logo, and about a year later the North American headquarters was relocated from Deerfield, Illinois, to their parts depot in Carol Stream, Illinois.

As the joint venture progressed, Fiat continued to invest in Fiat-Allis and Fiatallis much more than their partner Allis-Chalmers and eventually increased their ownership stake to 85% in the early 1980s. The two parent firms disagreed on decisions made about Fiatallis and Allis-Chalmers was struggling financially, so the joint venture was ended in November 1985 when Fiat bought out Allis-Chalmers's remaining minority stake.

In October 1985, Fiatallis closed their remaining North American factory in Springfield, Illinois, and transferred all remaining production to their Italian and Brazilian factories.

In 1986, Fiatallis and Hitachi formed a joint venture called Fiat-Hitachi Excavators S.p.A. to manufacture excavators in Italy.

In January 1988, Fiat combined their Fiatallis construction equipment subsidiary and their Fiatagri S.p.A. agricultural equipment subsidiary into the new Fiat Geotech S.p.A. holding company.

In July 1992, Fiat announced another joint venture between their Fiat Geotech subsidiary, and Hitachi Construction Machinery Company Limited that was called Fiat-Hitachi Construction Equipment S.p.A. The joint venture with Hitachi yielded Fiat-Hitachi and Fiatallis construction machinery branding for different markets until 2002 when Hitachi terminated the agreement.

After Fiat S.p.A. purchased Case Corporation in 1999 and formed CNH, they eventually retired the Fiatallis brand within a few years in their remaining markets and merged the company's assets with others from Case and New Holland. CNH's construction equipment lines are called New Holland Construction and Case Construction Equipment.

In Argentina, Fiat-Allis was produced by Crybsa. This product under license 605-B excavator, C-130 and the crawler tractors models like the 14C and the 7D.

The longtime site of wheel loader production in Deerfield, Illinois, at 500 Lake Cook Road is now the corporate location for Caterpillar Inc.
