= The Woodlands (Philadelphia) =

Historic site in Philadelphia, Pennsylvania, US

- U.S. National Register of Historic Places
- U.S. National Historic Landmark District
- Pennsylvania state historical marker
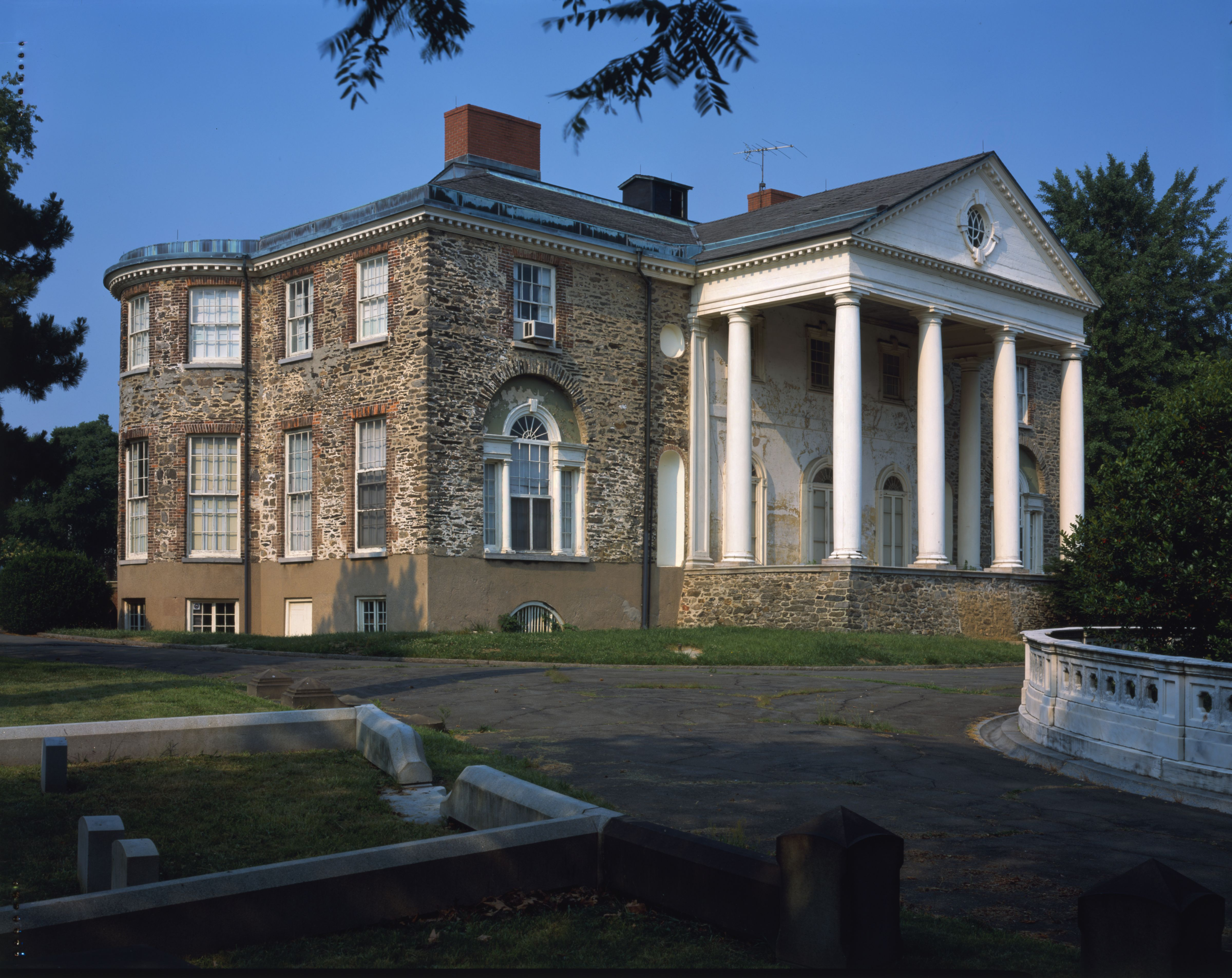
- Woodlands Mansion
- Location: 4000 Woodland Avenue, Philadelphia, Pennsylvania, US
- Coordinates: 39°56′50″N 75°12′11″W
- Area: 53 acres (21 ha)
- Built: 1770; 256 years ago
- Architect: William Hamilton
- Architectural style: Neoclassical; Robert Adam Style
- NRHP reference No.: 67000022

Significant dates
- Added to NRHP: December 24, 1967
- Designated NHLD: December 24, 1967
- Designated PHMC: December 28, 1996

The Woodlands is a National Historic Landmark District on the west bank of the Schuylkill River in Philadelphia. It includes a Federal-style mansion, a matching carriage house and stable, and a garden landscape that in 1840 was transformed into a Victorian rural cemetery with an arboretum of over 1,000 trees. More than 30,000 people are buried at the cemetery. Among the tombstones at Woodlands cemetery is the tombstone of Dr Thomas W. Evans, which at 150 feet (46 m), is both the tallest gravestone in the United States and the tallest obelisk gravestone in the world.

== Hamilton estate (1735–1840) ==
The land that would become The Woodlands was originally a 250-acre (1.0 km^{2}) tract in Blockley Township on the west bank of the Schuylkill River. It was purchased in 1735 by the famous Philadelphia lawyer Andrew Hamilton.

When Hamilton died in 1741, he willed his lands to his son, also named Andrew. The son survived his father by only six years, but in that time built up his landholdings enough to leave a 300-acre (1.2 km^{2}) estate to his own son, William Hamilton (1745–1813), who acquired it at the age of twenty-one. William built a Georgian-style mansion with a grand, two-storied portico overlooking the river above Gray's Ferry. Following a trip to England after the American Revolution, Hamilton doubled the size of the dwelling, creating a 16-room manor with kitchens and service rooms in a windowed ground floor. The rebuilt Woodlands mansion became one of the greatest domestic American architectural achievements of the 18th century, recognized as a leading example of English taste and presaging architectural trends in the following century.

Hamilton was an active botanist, and his estate and greenhouses grew to contain more than 10,000 species of plants, including the first specimens introduced into America of the Ginkgo biloba, Paper mulberry, Sycamore maple, Ailanthus, Caucasian zelkova, and Lombardy poplar as well as plants grown from seeds harvested during Lewis and Clark’s expeditions, especially the Osage Orange (Maclura pomifera). Hamilton also collected and exchanged numerous native plants with his friends and neighbors, the Bartram family of botanists from nearby Bartram's Garden.

At one time, the estate covered 600 acres (2.4 km^{2}) and stretched from the Schuylkill River to what is now Market Street on the north and 42nd Street on the west and incorporated Hamilton Village.

== Cemetery (1840–1960) ==
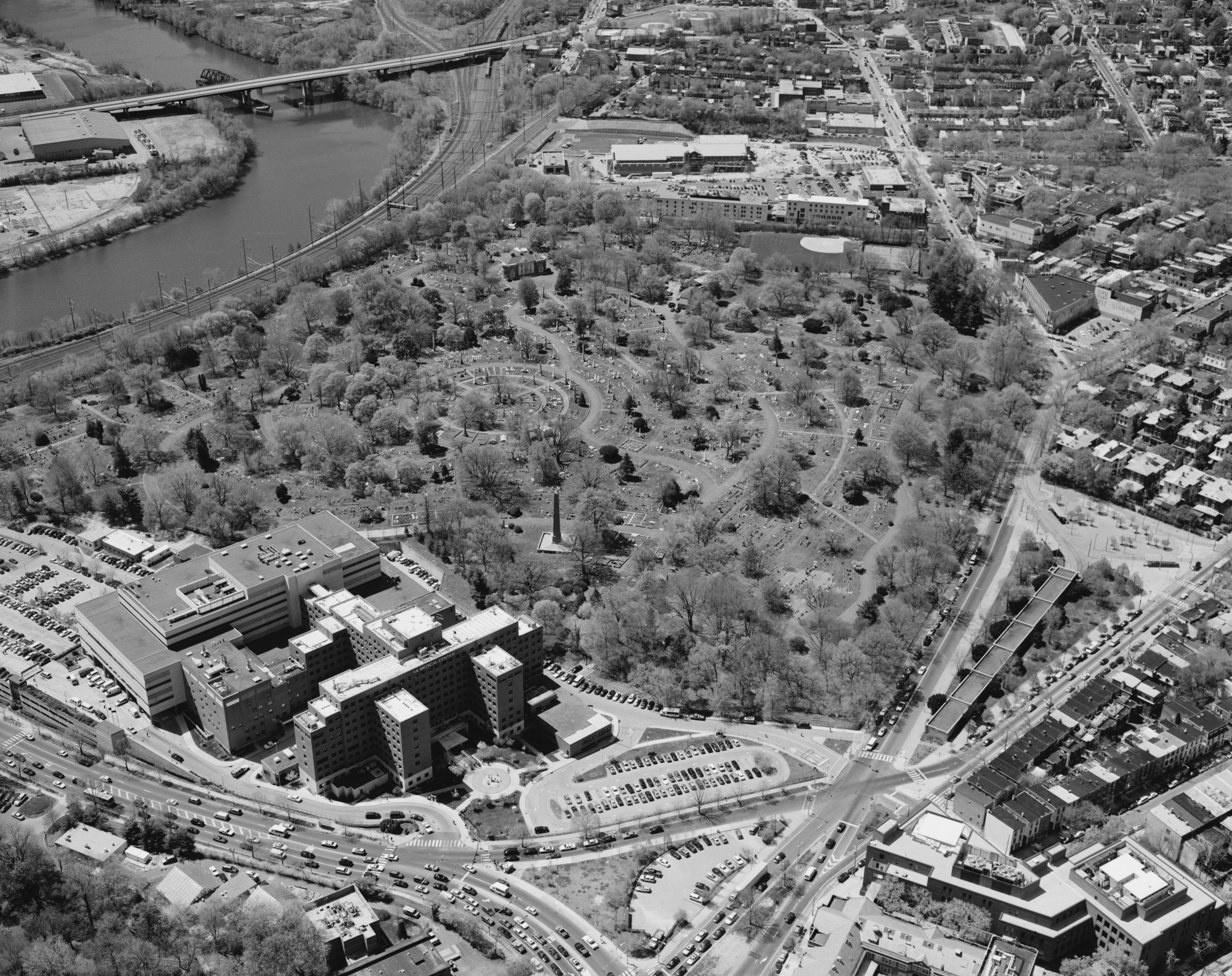
Aerial view looking southwest, 2003, by Jack Boucher. The Schuylkill River, in the top left corner, is crossed by the Gray's Ferry Bridge. The Saint Joseph's University - West Campus (formerly the University of the Sciences) is at the top, and the University of Pennsylvania at the bottom.

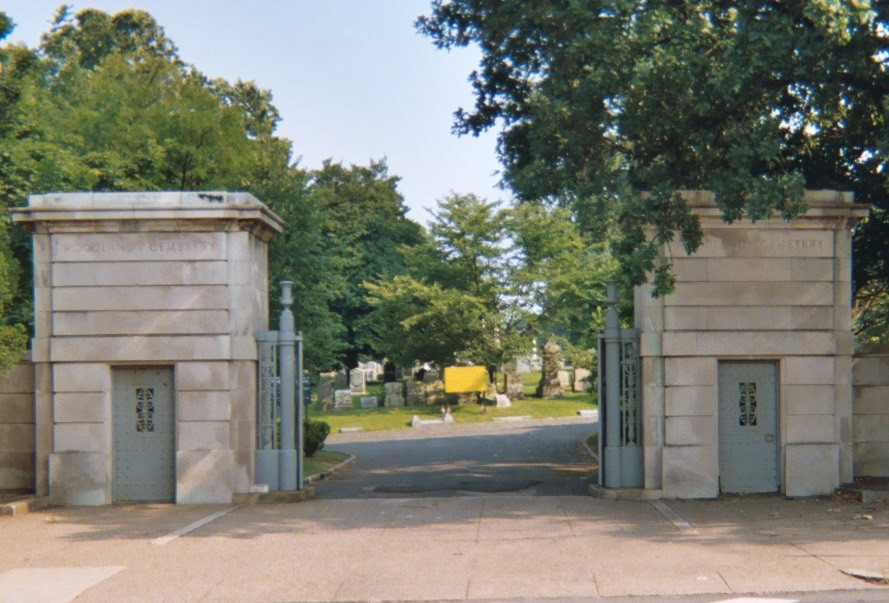
Gate to Woodlands designed by Paul Philippe Cret

After Hamilton died in 1813, his heirs sold off much of the Woodlands estate for institutional and residential development. By the first quarter of the 19th century, the West Philadelphia district was becoming a fashionable suburb. In order to save the core of Hamilton's estate, in 1840, The Woodlands Cemetery Company of Philadelphia purchased the last 92 acres (37 ha), which included the mansion, carriage house, greenhouse and hot houses, as well as extensive plantings. The founders concluded that The Woodlands' isolated location, its array of exotic trees and its commanding view of the Schuylkill River provided an ideal site for a rural cemetery. John McArthur Jr. designed the entrance architecture, which was demolished in 1936.

As with its rival to the north, Laurel Hill Cemetery, trustees of the Woodlands spurred the cemetery's early growth by interring the remains of a celebrity: Commodore David Porter. His remains, originally buried at the Philadelphia Naval Asylum cemetery, were reburied at Woodlands in 1845. By mid-century, The Woodlands was thriving and attracted many of Philadelphia's renowned industrialists, medical professionals, artists, writers, and veterans.

In 1853, the land along the river was sold to the West Chester and Philadelphia Railroad, which built a rail line along it. Over the next century, other railroads, particularly the Pennsylvania Railroad, added tracks. Today, eight tracks run along former Woodlands land, serving Amtrak passenger trains, Conrail freight, and the SEPTA Airport and Media commuter lines.

The Woodlands was a part of the United States National Cemetery System during the American Civil War with a leased lot within the cemetery for soldiers that died in nearby hospitals. The soldiers' remains were reinterred to the Philadelphia National Cemetery in 1885.

== Modern use (1960–present) ==
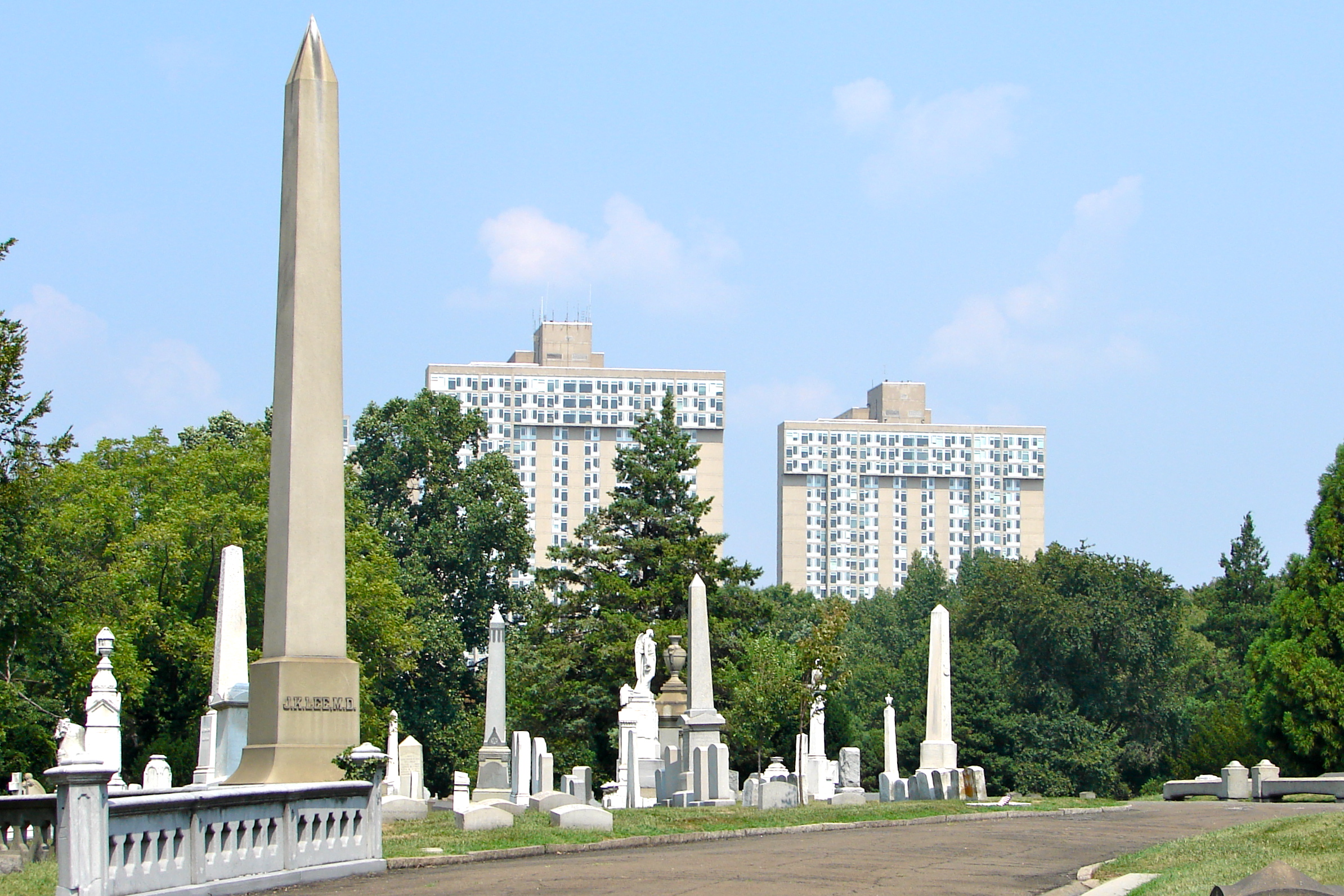
Looking east toward the University of Pennsylvania

The Woodlands estate was designated a National Historic Landmark in 1967. In 2006, the cemetery and other structures on the site were added to form a National Historic Landmark District.

Today, The Woodlands Cemetery Company of Philadelphia exists as a non-profit cemetery corporation that promotes both traditional and current burial practices on its 54 acres (22 ha) of land in University City. The company is supported by The Woodlands Trust for Historic Preservation, a non-profit corporation, dedicated to the preservation and promotion of the cemetery, mansion, and arboretum as a cultural landscape between the University of Pennsylvania and the Saint Joseph's University - West Campus (formerly the University of the Sciences) in Philadelphia.

The pathways and avenues of the cemetery and mansion make up the Woodlands Heritage National Recreation Trail, part of the National Recreation Trail program. The cemetery includes a looped road system emanating from a central paved circle with infrequent motor vehicle traffic, making the grounds a safe and quiet place for biking, running and walking. There is also an unpaved path that encircles the perimeter of the grounds that is a popular circuit for University City dog-walkers and runners. Leashed dogs are permitted on the grounds, which are free and open to the public from dawn to dusk. The cemetery also hosts a community garden, community activities, an orchard, and apiary. It is also the headquarters of the Philadelphia Orchard Project.

== Notable burials ==
- John Joseph Abercrombie (1798–1877), Civil War general
- Timothy Shay Arthur (1809–1885), author, founder of Arthur's Home Magazine
- Baba Tatsui (馬場 辰猪) (1850–1888), Japanese legislative reformer
- Hartman Bache (1798–1872), Civil War Union brevet brigadier general
- Anthony Joseph Drexel Biddle Sr. (1875–1948), author, adventurer, the man upon whom the play and film The Happiest Millionaire were based
- Anthony Joseph Drexel Biddle Jr. (1897–1961), diplomat (cenotaph)
- David B. Birney (1825–1864), Civil War Union major general
- Sylvester Bonnaffon Jr. (1844–1922), Civil War Medal of Honor recipient
- Benjamin Harris Brewster (1816–1888), presidential cabinet secretary
- Henry Grier Bryant (1859–1932), explorer
- William Bucknell (1811—1890), financier, philanthropist, benefactor to Bucknell University
- William Christian Bullitt (1891–1967), diplomat, journalist, and novelist
- James Hepburn Campbell (1820–1895), U.S. Representative
- Joseph A. Campbell (1817–1900), businessman, founder of Campbell Soup Company
- J. Hinckley Clark (1837-1889), banker, Union Army officer, and railroad executive
- Edward Coles (1786–1868), 2nd governor of Illinois, private secretary to Presidents Thomas Jefferson and James Madison
- Elliott Cresson (1796–1854), philanthropist
- Paul Philippe Cret (1876–1945), architect, designed the Woodlands' main gate
- Thomas Cripps (1840–1906), Civil War Medal of Honor recipient
- George H. Crosman (1799–1882), Civil War brevet major general
- Jacob Mendes Da Costa (1833–1900), surgeon
- Francis Martin Drexel (1792–1863), Philadelphia banker, progenitor of the Drexel banking dynasty
- Anthony Joseph Drexel (1826–1893), founder of Drexel University
- Joseph William Drexel (1833–1888), banker, trustee of the Metropolitan Museum of Art and the U.S. National Academy of Sciences, and director of the Metropolitan Opera house
- Thomas Eakins (1844–1916), artist, and his wife Susan (1851–1938)
- Thomas W. Evans (1823–1897), dentist
- Wilson Eyre (1858–1944), architect
- Clement Finley (1797–1879), Civil War Union brevet brigadier general
- Alice Fisher (1839–1888), nursing pioneer at the former Philadelphia General Hospital
- Sidney George Fisher (1809–1871) lawyer, farmer, political essayist
- Frederick Fraley (1804–1901) Pennsylvania State Senator from 1837 to 1839
- John Fraser (1825–1906), architect
- Samuel David Gross (1805–1884), medical pioneer
- James Gwyn (1828–1906), Civil War Union brevet major-general
- Ferdinand Vandeveer Hayden (1829–1887), geologist
- Edward W. Heston (1745–1824), PA state senator and Revolutionary War colonel, founder and namesake of Hestonville
- Henry Horn (1786–1862), U.S. Representative
- Charles Jared Ingersoll (1782–1862), U.S. Representative
- William Williams Keen (1837–1932), first U.S. brain surgeon
- Ellis Lewis (1798–1871), Pennsylvania Chief Justice
- James Barton Longacre (1794–1869), engraver
- Silas Weir Mitchell (1829–1914), physician and writer
- Samuel Moore (1774–1861), U.S. Representative
- Anna Claypoole Peale (1791–1878), American miniature painter, daughter of James Peale
- Rembrandt Peale (1778–1860), artist
- Jane Piper (1916–1991), artist
- Eli Kirk Price (1797–1884), lawyer, state senator
- Eli Kirk Price II (1860–1933), lawyer, art patron
- David Porter (1780–1843), naval officer
- William D. Porter (1808–1864), naval officer
- Lewis Redner (1831–1908), organist, composer, wrote the music for Phillips Brooks's poem "O Little Town of Bethlehem"
- Marcus Aurelius Root (1808–1888), prominent photographer whose subjects included Edgar Allan Poe and P.T. Barnum
- William Rush (1756–1833), sculptor
- John Scott (1824–1896), U.S. senator
- Thomas Alexander Scott (1823–1881), president of the Pennsylvania Railroad
- Jessie Willcox Smith (1863–1935), illustrator
- Charles Stewart (1778–1869), naval officer
- Frank R. Stockton (1834–1902), author of "The Lady or the Tiger?" and other tales
- Edward T. Stotesbury (1849–1938), prominent partner at J.P. Morgan & Co. and its Philadelphia affiliate Drexel & Co.
- William Moseley Swain (1809–1868), journalist
- James Thompson (1806–1874), U.S. Representative
- John Edgar Thomson (1808–1874), civil engineer, railroad executive and industrialist
- Ida Waugh (1846–1919), illustrator, and her father Samuel Waugh (1814–1885), artist. His portrait subjects included President Abraham Lincoln and Ulysses S. Grant
- Rufus Welch (1800–1855), circus impresario
- Anne Hollingsworth Wharton (1845–1928), author and historian
- Asa Whitney (1797–1872), railroad magnate
- Alan Wood Jr., U.S. Representative
- Horatio Curtis Wood (1841–1920), physician

== See also ==
- Mill Creek
- List of National Historic Landmarks in Philadelphia
- National Register of Historic Places listings in West Philadelphia
