= Penn Township, Huntingdon County, Pennsylvania =

Township in Pennsylvania, US

Penn Township
- Township
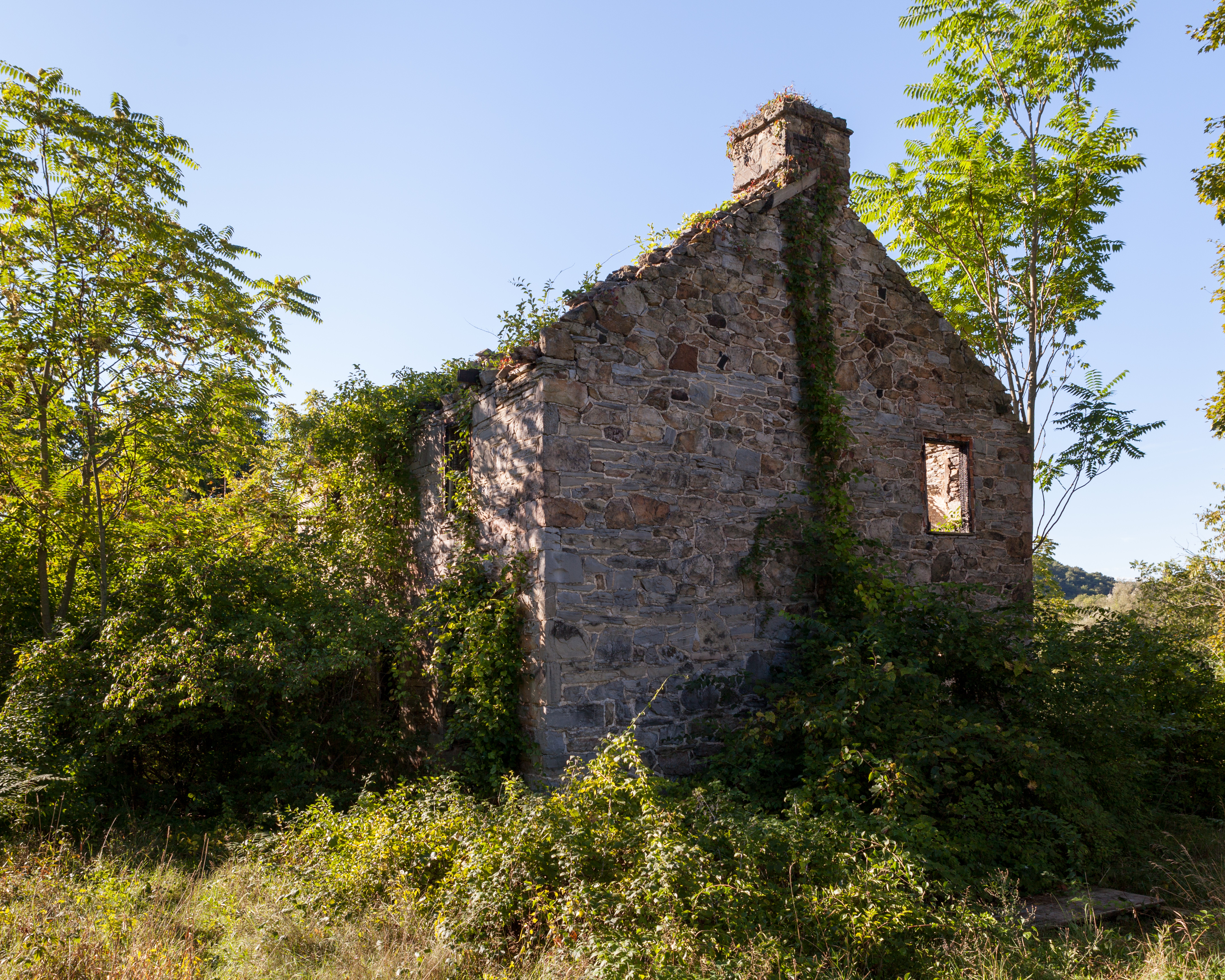
- Ruins of the Brumbaugh Homestead, a historic site in the township

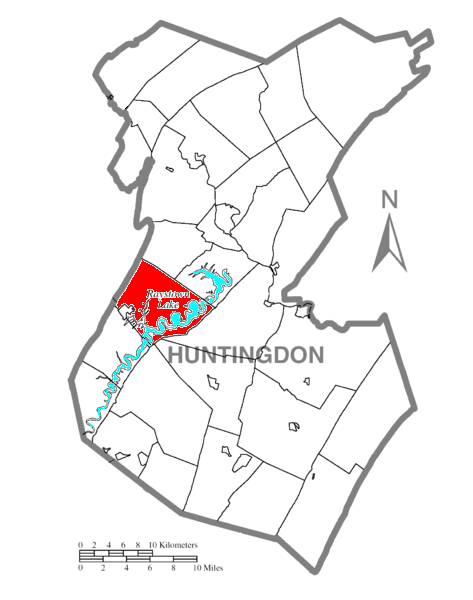
- Map of Huntingdon County, Pennsylvania Highlighting Penn Township

- Map of Huntingdon County, Pennsylvania
- Coordinates: 40.4°N 78.1°W
- Country: United States
- State: Pennsylvania
- County: Huntingdon

Area
  - Total: 34.57 sq mi (89.53 km^{2})
  - Land: 28.62 sq mi (74.13 km^{2})
  - Water: 5.95 sq mi (15.41 km^{2})

Population (2020)
  - Total: 1,078 ▲
  - Estimate (2022): 1,062
  - Density: 38.0/sq mi (14.68/km^{2})
- Time zone: UTC-5 (Eastern (EST))
  - Summer (DST): UTC-4 (EDT)
- Zip code: 16647, 16657
- Area code: 814
- FIPS code: 42-061-58832
- Local phone exchanges: 658

Penn Township is a township in Huntingdon County, Pennsylvania, United States. The population was 1,078 at the 2020 census. The township includes the village of Hesston and the Seven Points Marina of Raystown Lake.

== History ==
"The Proprietaries of the Pennsylvania province, mindful of the rights of the natives and anxious to promote peace with them, would not grant land nor permit settlements to be made until the Indian title had been purchased. At a treaty held at Albany on the 6th day of July 1754, the Six Nations, consisting of the Mohawks, Oneidas, Onondagas, Cayugas, Senecas and Tuscaroras, executed a deed to the Proprietaries for a large portion of the territory of the province including the whole of the valley of the Juniata [then Harrisburg to Pittsburgh]. Soon after this event the resident tribes sought a home elsewhere."

According to various family histories—the white settlers first inhabited the Woodcock Valley Manor during the American Revolutionary War and as early as 1772. For the first time the families of Northern Europeans [German, English, Irish & Welsh] lived in freedom and worshiped the religion of their choice. The early colonists cleared the virgin forests and carved farms out the land—and these are the same working farms that you see today.

"In the early 1800s individuals of the area began mining Tussey Mountain for ore. These men operated on a small scale, but later larger companies started operations. One of these was the Grove Brothers of Danville, Montour Co., PA. They hauled ore to Cambria Iron Ore Works at Johnstown."

Penn Township was officially made from part of Hopewell Township on November 21, 1846.

The ore was processed into Juniata pig iron and sent away from the area to be manufactured into tools, machinery, steam engines, and the first railroads.

"On May 6, 1852, the Huntingdon and Broad Top Railroad and Coal Company was incorporated and on August 13, 1855, trains began running from Huntingdon to Bedford." and through the villages of Penn Township.

In 1885—"Robert Hare Powel & Company built a track from their quarries out from Grafton [Hesston] to the line of the Huntingdon & Broad Top railroad, one-half mile south of the station for the purpose of shipping limestone to their furnace at Saxton."

"The first telephone company entirely located within Penn Township was called the Raystown Branch Telephone Company. It was commonly called the 'Buttermilk line'. Having thirty six subscribers. Poles and wire were maintained by them. The line had one wire and used the earth as the second, a ground wire."(1896)

"In the early 1900s the Colonial Iron Company of Riddlesburg, purchased the Grove Brothers operations. The mines continued in operation until before WWI when they closed down."

"Penn Township was not completely electrified until 1947, which was when Valley Rural Electric Cooperative strung lines on the hills and valleys from Tussey Mountain to the Raystown Branch of the Juniata River. Holes were dug and poles set, all by hand."

The Brumbaugh Homestead was listed on the National Register of Historic Places in 1979.

== Geography ==
According to the United States Census Bureau, the township has a total area of 34.3 square miles (88.8 km^{2}), of which 28.2 square miles (73.1 km^{2}) is land and 6.1 square miles (15.7 km^{2}) (17.65%) is water.

=== Adjacent Municipalities ===
All municipalities listed are in Huntingdon County unless otherwise noted.

- Marklesburg borough
- Walker Township
- Juniata Township
- Lincoln Township
- Union Township
- Cass Township
- Huston Township, Blair County
- Woodbury Township, Blair County

== Demographics ==
Historical population
Census	Pop.	Note	%±
2000	1,054		—
2010	1,077		2.2%
2020	1,078		0.1%
2022 (est.)	1,062		−1.5%
U.S. Decennial Census

As of the census of 2000, there were 1,054 people, 400 households, and 320 families residing in the township. The population density was 37.3 inhabitants per square mile (14.4/km^{2}). There were 666 housing units at an average density of 23.6/sq mi (9.1/km^{2}). The racial makeup of the township was 99.15% White, 0.09% African American, 0.57% from other races, and 0.19% from two or more races. Hispanic or Latino of any race were 0.95% of the population.

There were 400 households, out of which 33.8% had children under the age of 18 living with them, 68.0% were married couples living together, 7.8% had a female householder with no husband present, and 20.0% were non-families. 16.8% of all households were made up of individuals, and 5.5% had someone living alone who was 65 years of age or older. The average household size was 2.56 and the average family size was 2.87.

In the township the population was spread out, with 24.0% under the age of 18, 4.9% from 18 to 24, 29.9% from 25 to 44, 28.0% from 45 to 64, and 13.2% who were 65 years of age or older. The median age was 40 years. For every 100 females there were 105.9 males. For every 100 females age 18 and over, there were 98.8 males.

The median income for a household in the township was $41,210, and the median income for a family was $42,083. Males had a median income of $35,066 versus $22,614 for females. The per capita income for the township was $17,063. About 5.6% of families and 11.9% of the population were below the poverty line, including 15.3% of those under age 18 and 6.7% of those age 65 or over.

== Recreation ==
A portion of Raystown Lake is located in Penn Township and a small portion of Pennsylvania State Game Lands Number 118 is located on the eastern slope of Tussey Mountain in the western part of the township.
