= Someca =

Tractor manufacturers of France

Fiat Someca
- Type: Public
- Industry: Agricultural Equipment
- Founded: France 1953
- Defunct: 1993
- Fate: Merged
- Headquarters: France
- Key people: Henri Théodore Pigozzi
- Products: Tractors
- Parent: Fiat Trattori

Someca was a French agricultural equipment manufacturer. Created in 1953 by SIMCA, a then-subsidiary of Fiat Auto Italia, “Fiat Someca”, in 1958 became part of SIMCA Industries.

== History ==
a Someca tractor in Normandy

SAFAF (Société Anonyme Française des Automobiles Fiat), the company from which SIMCA was formed, began importing and later manufacturing licensed Fiat vehicles from a Nanterre factory in 1934. It also imported Fiat tractors as well as Steyr tractors into France.

In 1953, SIMCA bought out the agricultural motors and tractors division of the company MAP, which it then used as the basis for the creation of SOMECA ("Société de MECAnique de la Seine"). SOMECA went on to produce the very first SOMECA tractors and parts for the last tractors to be produced by MAP.

The first SOMECA tractor was the "DA 50", closely derived from the "MAP DR3" model, whose engine could develop 37 hp at 1500 rpm. The next model, the "SOM 40" was hugely successful in France. Launched in 1957, it was ranked among the largest tractors ever to be built in France. It was equipped with a Fiat OM CO1D 45 engine: a four-stroke, direct injection, 4165 cc diesel engine developing 45 hp at 1500 rpm. By 1964, 18,741 models had been manufactured, a new record for that time!

With the arrival of petrol engines during the 1950-1960s, the same model became available with either a petrol or diesel engine.

More than 40,000 SOMECA tractors using the Fiat base engine had been manufactured by 1960.

Come 1965, the year in which the "15" series was launched, SOMECA was only manufacturing licensed Fiat Trattori models. FIAT had always been SOMECA's majority shareholder and, in 1983, integrated the company into its agricultural subsidiary FiatAgri, which became Fiat New Holland in 1993 before becoming Fiat CNH Global, as it is currently known.

== Someca in the rest of the world ==
In 1954 in Argentina, Fiat create a subsidiary for the local manufacture of agricultural tractors which was named "Fiat Someca Construcciones Córdoba" which will become Fiat Concord in 1959. Some of the models produced in Argentina by Fíat Concord under the brand Someca:

- Someca M45
- Someca M45 cane
- Someca M50
