= Anne Hollingsworth Wharton =

American writer and historian

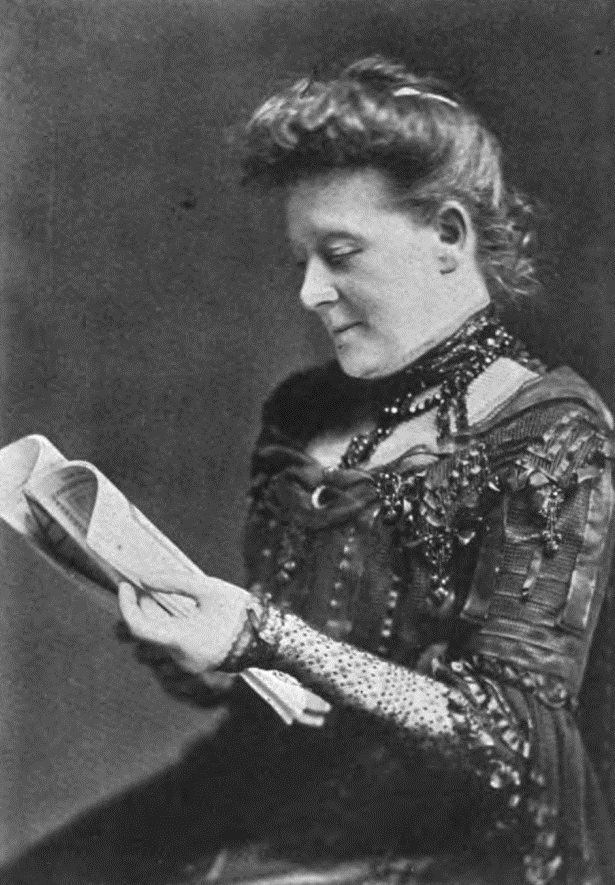
- Born: December 15, 1845; Southampton Township, Cumberland County, Pennsylvania
- Died: July 29, 1928 (aged 82)
- Occupations: writer and historian

Anne Hollingsworth Wharton (December 15, 1845 – July 29, 1928) was an American writer and historian.

== Formative years ==
Wharton was born in Southampton Furnace, Pennsylvania on December 15, 1845. The daughter of Charles Wharton and Mary McLanahan Boggs, she was also a direct descendant of Robert Wharton, the longest serving mayor of Philadelphia.

Educated at a private school in Philadelphia, she received a Litt. D. from the University of Pennsylvania.

== Career ==
She devoted herself primarily to the study of the social history of the Colonial and Revolutionary periods of the United States, wrote a number of books and magazine articles in this field, and was chosen historian of The National Society of the Colonial Dames of America. She also helped to found the Pennsylvania Society of the Colonial Dames of America. In 1893, she was a judge at the American Colonial Exhibit at the World's Colombian Exposition at Chicago.

She was also involved in genealogy and published The Genealogy of the Wharton Family in 1880. In 1915, the J.E. Lippincott Company published her book, English Ancestral Homes of Noted Americans."

A lifetime member of the Historical Society of Pennsylvania, she also served as vice president of the Browning Society of Philadelphia and was a member of the Pennsylvania Audubon Society.

== Illness, death and interment ==
During the summer of 1928, Wharton fell ill. She died three weeks later, at the age of eighty-three, at her home at 2220 Locust Street in Philadelphia on Sunday, July 29, 1928. Her funeral was held at Philadelphia's historic Christ Church. She was interred at The Woodlands Cemetery in the Wharton family's plot.

== Works ==
- St. Bartholomew's Eve (1866)
- The Wharton Family (1880)
- Through Colonial Doorways (1893)
- Colonial Days and Dames (1894)
- A Last Century Maid (1895)
- Life of Martha Washington (1897)
- Heirlooms in Miniatures (1897)
- Salons Colonial and Republican (1900)
- Social Life in the Early Republic (1902)
- An English Honeymoon (1908)
- Italian Days and Ways (1908)
- In Château Land (1911)
- A Rose of Old Quebec (1913)
- English Ancestral Homes of Noted Americans (1915)
- In Old Pennsylvania Towns (1920)
