= Brumbaugh Homestead =

Historic house in Pennsylvania, US

- U.S. National Register of Historic Places
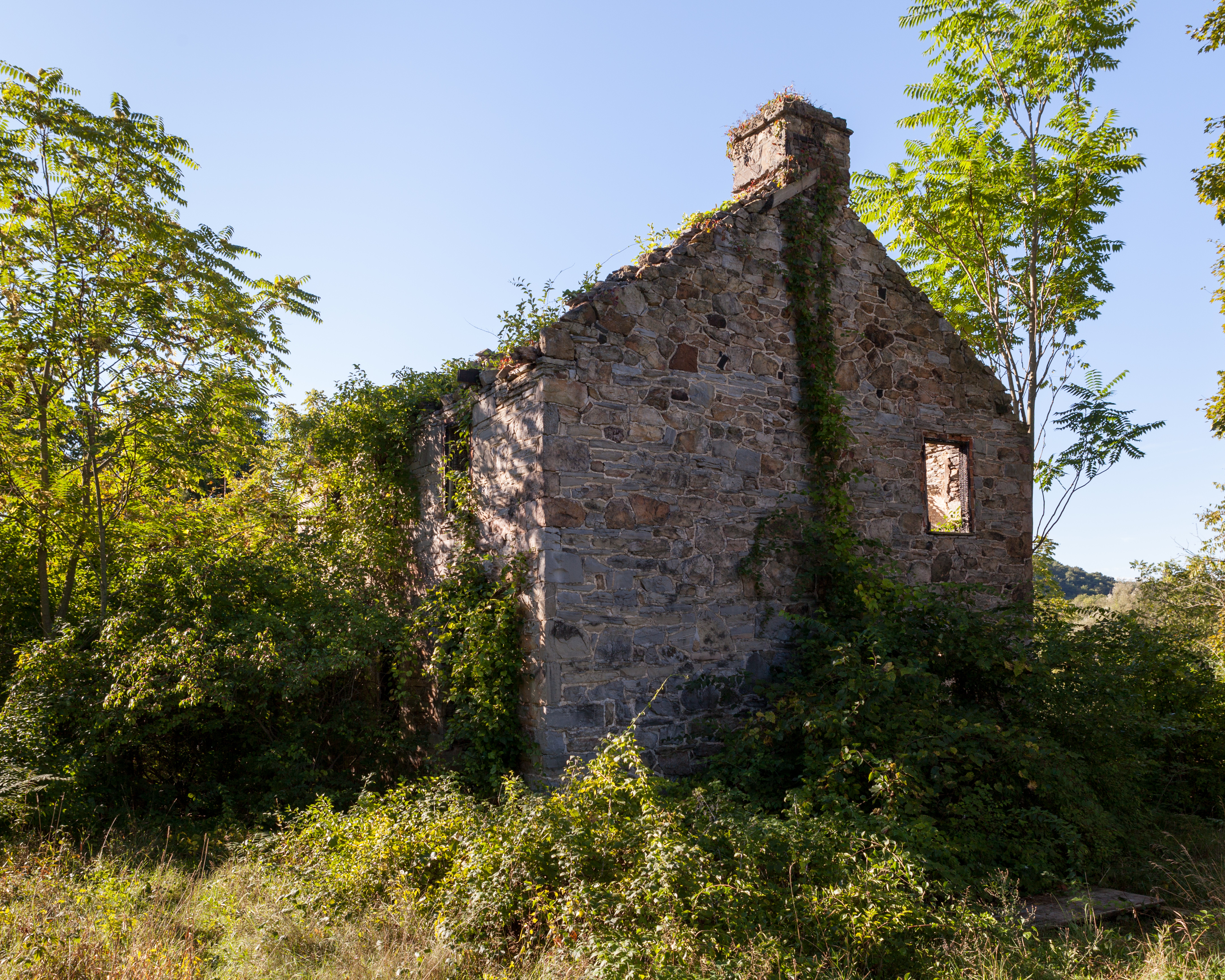
- The ruins in September 2014.

- Location within Pennsylvania Location within the United States
- Location: Northeast of Marklesburg off Pennsylvania Route 26, Penn Township, Huntingdon County, Pennsylvania
- Coordinates: 40°23′35″N 78°8′30″W
- Area: 1 acre (0.40 ha)
- Built: 1804
- Architectural style: Federal
- NRHP reference No.: 79002236
- Added to NRHP: March 28, 1979

Brumbaugh Homestead, also known as the Timothy Meadows Farm, is a historic home located at Penn Township in Huntingdon County, Pennsylvania. It was built in three sections. The oldest section was built in 1804 and is a two-story, stone building in an early Federal style. A brick addition and vertical plank addition were added to the stone section sometime before the 1860s. The house is believed to have been used for church services for the James Creek Dunker Congression, later Church of the Brethren.

It was listed on the National Register of Historic Places in 1979.
