= Marcus Aurelius Root =

American photographer

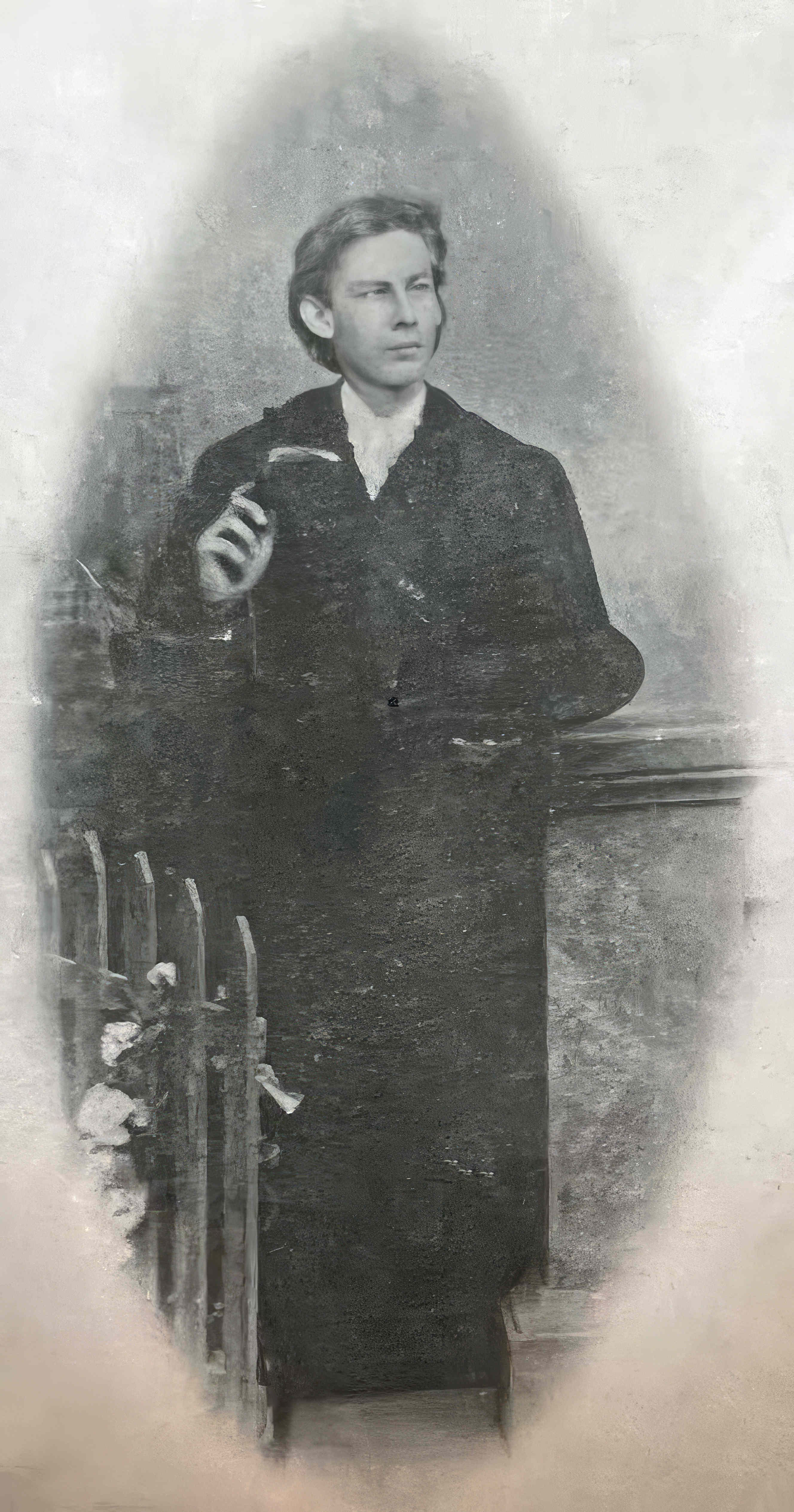
Marcus Aurelius Root, Philadelphia daguerreotypist and photographer

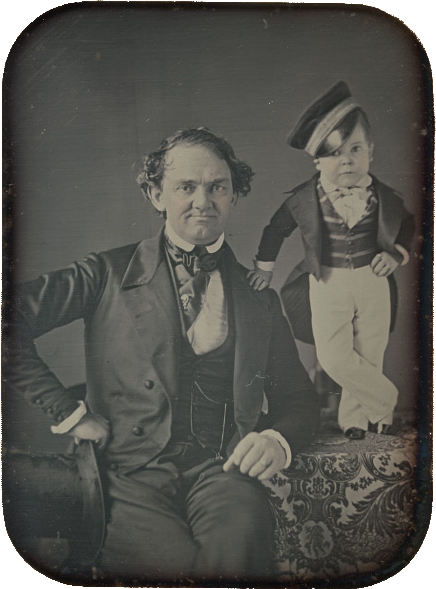
Half-plate daguerreotype of Phineas Taylor Barnum and Charles Sherwood Stratton (PT Barnum and General Tom Thumb) circa 1850 by Samuel Root

Marcus Aurelius Root (1808–1888) was a writing teacher and photographer. He was born in Granville, Ohio and died in Philadelphia, Pennsylvania.

Root was a leading daguerreotypist in the United States, with studios in New York City, Philadelphia, Boston, St. Louis, Mobile, New Orleans and Washington, D.C. His studio photographed some of the biggest celebrities of his time, including Edgar Allan Poe, Jenny Lind, P.T. Barnum, General Tom Thumb, presidential candidate Winfield Scott, and Vice President of the United States George M. Dallas.

Portraits on U.S. dollar bills were also taken from daguerreotypes made by Root, including portraits of Henry Clay on the $50 bill and Daniel Webster on the $10 bill. Root is also speculated to have made the portrait of Ulysses Grant on the $50 bill.

He authored an important book on photography entitled The Camera and the Pencil.

== Life and career ==
In 1835, Root moved to Philadelphia to take lessons in portrait painting from Thomas Sully, whose subjects included Thomas Jefferson, John Quincy Adams, Andrew Jackson and Queen Victoria.

The first daguerreotype Root ever made was in 1839 on solid silver. It was a view from one of the windows of the Philadelphia Mint. It was later featured at the Centennial Exposition.

Lacking success in painting, Root turned to photography in 1843 and opened a daguerreotype studio.

On June 20, 1846, he bought John Jabez Edwin Mayall's Chestnut Street photography studio that was in the same building as Root's residence in Philadelphia. Root had success as a daguerreotypist working with his brother, Samuel Root. The Root Brothers had a gallery in New York City from 1849 to 1857.

Marcus Aurelius Root was awarded first prize at the Great Exhibition in London in 1851. He was also awarded first prize at annual exhibitions of the Franklin Institute.

== Misfortune and legacy ==
In June 1856, Root invested $40,000 in Mt. Vernon Hotel of Cape May, New Jersey, which was described as the world's largest resort hotel. It was entirely destroyed by a deadly fire three months later, losing Root's entire investment.

While preparing for a New York City gallery opening in December 1856, Root was seriously injured in a train accident. He was standing on a train platform in Alliance, Ohio when two trains collided, throwing cars into the rotunda of the station and part of a hotel, killing 8 people including a man standing beside Root. Root's left leg was crushed and the thigh was severely fractured, leaving him crippled for the rest of his life. The engineer responsible fled according to newspaper reports. Root's lawyer collected the damages and absconded with the money.

During his lengthy recovery, Root authored an exhaustive history of American photography, a book entitled The Camera and the Pencil. Root argued for photographers to be considered artists alongside painters.

After falling from a streetcar in 1885 he spent the rest of his life in seclusion until he died from his injuries three years later, at his home in Philadelphia, on April 2, 1888. He was buried at The Woodlands Cemetery.
