= Hesston =

Hesston may refer to:

== Places in the United States ==
- Hesston, Indiana, an unincorporated community
- Hesston, Kansas, a city
- Hesston, Pennsylvania, an unincorporated community

== Other uses ==
- Hesston College, a two-year college, located in Hesston, Kansas
- Hesston Corporation, an agricultural equipment manufacturer, purchased by AGCO, located in Hesston, Kansas

== See also ==
- Heston (disambiguation)
