= Reach Academy Feltham =

Coordinates: 51.443°N 0.411°W

Location
- 53-55 High Street; Feltham, TW13 4AB; England

Information
- Type: Free school
- Local authority: London Borough of Hounslow
- Department for Education URN: 138266 Tables
- Ofsted: Reports
- Headteacher: Ed Vainker
- Gender: Mixed
- Age: 4 to 18
- Enrolment: 526
- Website: www.reachacademyfeltham.com

The Reach Academy Feltham is an all-through free school which opened in Feltham in the London Borough of Hounslow in 2012.
