= Edward W. Heston =

American politician

Edward Warner Heston
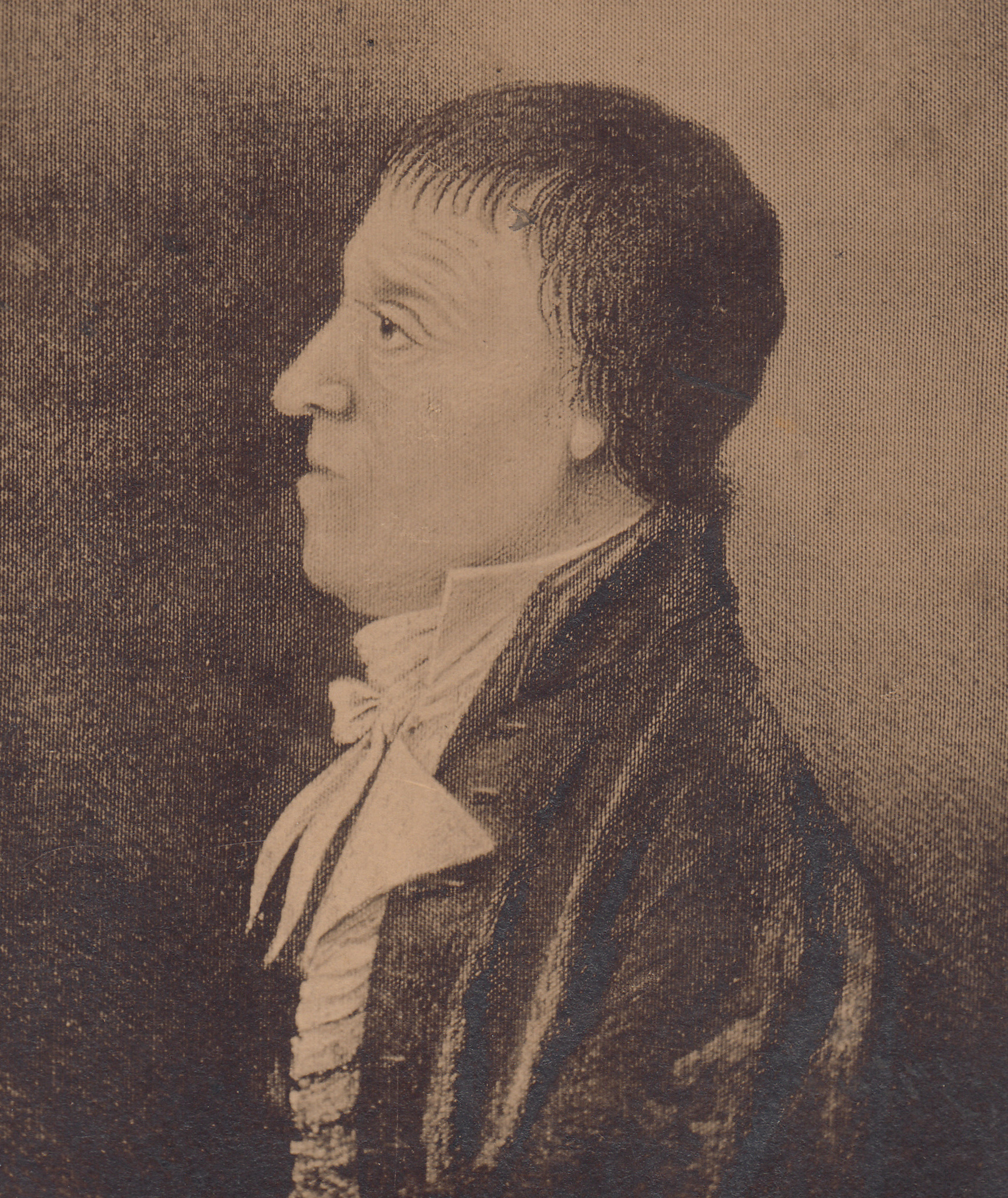
- Drawing, circa 1805. Philadelphia, Pennsylvania.
- Born: March 16, 1745; Upper Makefield Township, Pennsylvania, US
- Died: 14 February 1824 (aged 78); Blockley Township, Pennsylvania
- Political party: Jeffersonian Republicans

Edward Warner Heston (March 16, 1745 – February 14, 1824) was an officer in the Sixth Company, Seventh Battalion of the Pennsylvania militia during the American Revolutionary War and later a Pennsylvania State Senator (1802-1810).

During the Revolution, Heston entered service as a captain. In a skirmish with the British, he suffered a severe sword cut to the back of the head and was taken prisoner and sent to Long Island, where he was held for seven months. By the end of the war, he rose to the rank of lieutenant colonel.

Heston founded a village along the Lancaster Pike named Hestonville, in the former Blockley Township, now part of Philadelphia. The Heston Mansion, located near the current Heston Elementary School, was built in 1800 and was purchased by the Pennsylvania Railroad in 1872; it was demolished in 1901 to make way for a railroad.

After the war, Heston was elected to the Pennsylvania General Assembly, where he actively supported the abolition of slavery in Pennsylvania. He subsequently served as a judge in the Philadelphia Court of Common Pleas for four years, and then as a state senator for eight years.

Heston was the father of 14 children. He died at his residence in Hestonville and is buried in The Woodlands Cemetery.
