= Heston (name) =

Heston is both an Irish and English surname and a given name. Notable people with the name include:

== Surname ==
- Alan Heston (born 1934–2024), American economist
- Charlton Heston (1923–2008), American actor
- Chris Heston (born 1988), American baseball player
- Edward W. Heston (1745–1824), American revolutionary
- Fraser Clarke Heston (born 1955), American screenwriter, son of Charlton Heston
- Steven L. Heston, American mathematician, economist and financier
- Watson Heston (1846–1905), American cartoonist
- Willie Heston (1878–1963), American footballer

== Given name ==
- Heston Blumenthal (born 1966), English chef
- Heston Kjerstad (born 1999), American baseball player

== Fictional characters ==
- Heston Carter, on the soap opera Doctors
