= Isleworth Town Primary School =

Location
- Twickenham Road; Isleworth; Greater London, TW7 6AB; England; 51.47357°N 0.32795°W

Information
- Type: Community school
- Established: October 1910
- Local authority: Hounslow
- Department for Education URN: 102492 Tables
- Ofsted: Reports
- Headteacher: Eileen Sheedy
- Gender: Mixed
- Age: 2 to 11
- Website: isleworthtown.hounslow.sch.uk

Isleworth Town Primary School, founded in 1910, is a mixed community primary school located in Isleworth, London. In a 2023 Ofsted inspection, the school received a good mark, which it has retained since 2012.

== Education ==
Isleworth Town Primary School has a nursery and provides education for pupils up to year six.

The school "prioritises reading," with "all teaching staff having received training to teach phonics." According to a 2023 Ofsted report,

The school curriculum is ambitious and in line with the national curriculum. Leaders have considered the important knowledge that pupils need to know and remember. They think carefully about how pupils build on prior knowledge so that they know and remember more as they get older. Sometimes, leaders and teachers place too much focus on tasks and activities, rather than on the subject content and skills that they want pupils to know and remember. As a result, at times, pupils struggle to recall some key subject knowledge. Leaders are working with teachers to make sure important knowledge is made explicit and recapped effectively.

Students with disabilities receive appropriate supports.

Beyond primary subjects, students are taught about mental and physical health and receive social-emotional learning, with emphasis placed on being respectful, kind, confident, creative, independent, and ambitious.

== Culture ==
According to a 2023 Ofsted inspection, pupils indicated that Isleworth Town Primary School is "welcoming and inclusive. [...] Pupils treat each other with kindness and respect. Older pupils enjoy helping younger ones at breaktimes and in class."

School leaders and staff also received positive remarks. According to the report, "Leaders and school staff build nurturing, professional relationships with pupils," and bullying is dealt with appropriately. This results in pupils being willing and able to discuss important matters with adults in school.

== Demographics ==
As of the 2021-22 school year, Isleworth Town Primary School had 912 pupils:

- 51.0% boys and 49.0% girls
- 22.2% have qualified for free lunch at some point in the previous six years
- 15.9% receive Special Educational Needs supports
- 39.4% have a first language other than English
