= Braud (company) =

Agricultural machinery manufacturers of France

- Industry: Agricultural
- Founded: 1870
- Headquarters: St Mars La Jaille, France

Braud was founded in 1870 in St Mars La Jaille in France; at the time Braud was manufacturing threshing machines. In 1908 Braud produced the first power-driven thresher and in 1927 the first thresher made completely with metal. Braud acquired a strong position in the French combine harvester market, reaching 1.600 units sold in 1968; in the European crisis of the ’70 Braud lost 45% and focused production on grape harvesters. In 1975 Braud produced its first grape harvester, model 1020; this was followed by 1040, the best selling grape harvester with over 2000 units sold in 4 years. Braud soon became the leader in self-propelled grape harvester, with 60% of market share in France and 50% worldwide. In 1983 Braud produced 670 grape harvesters. In 1984 Fiatagri acquired 75% of Braud.

Braud Self Propelled Grape Harvesters
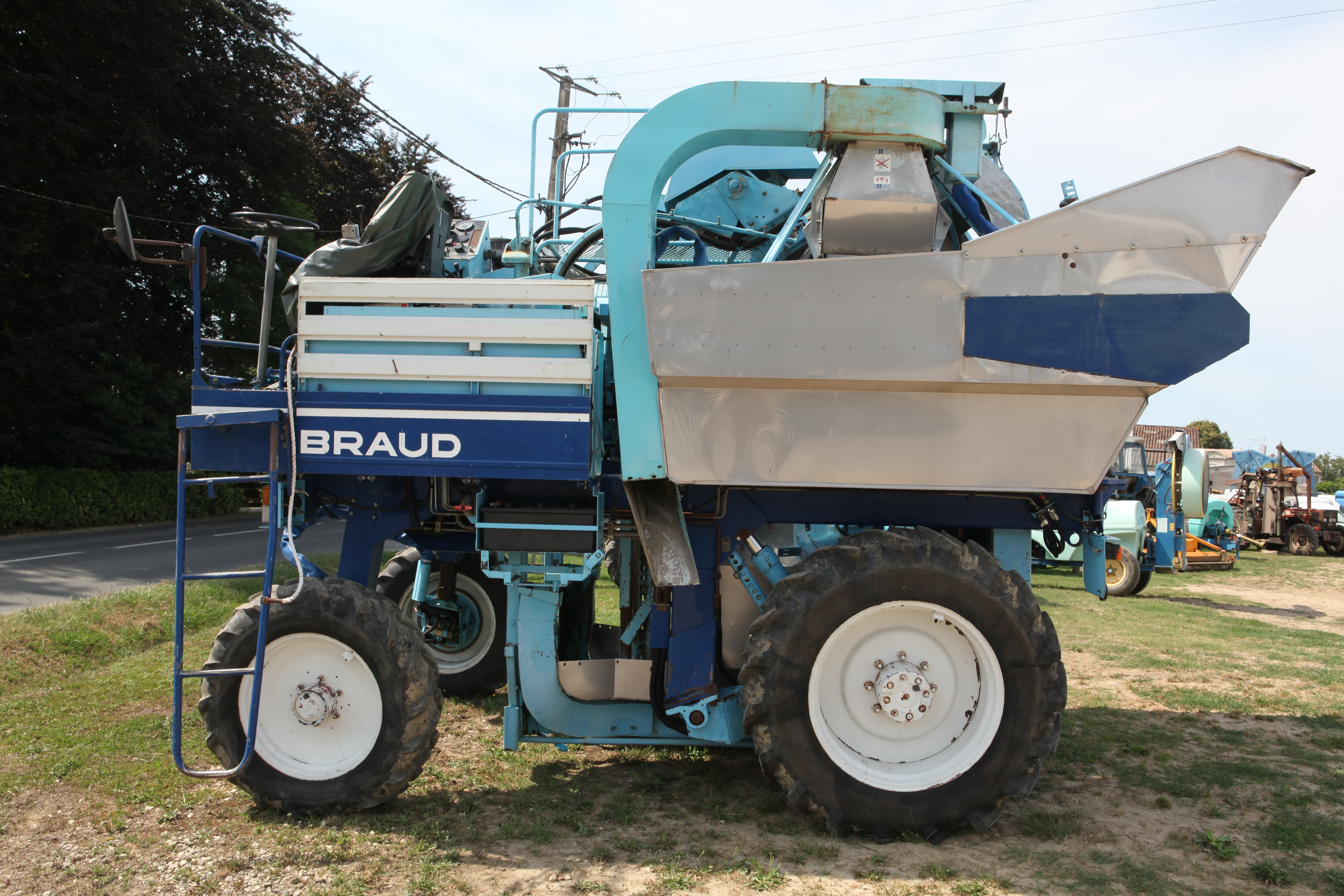
Braud 2514 grape harvester

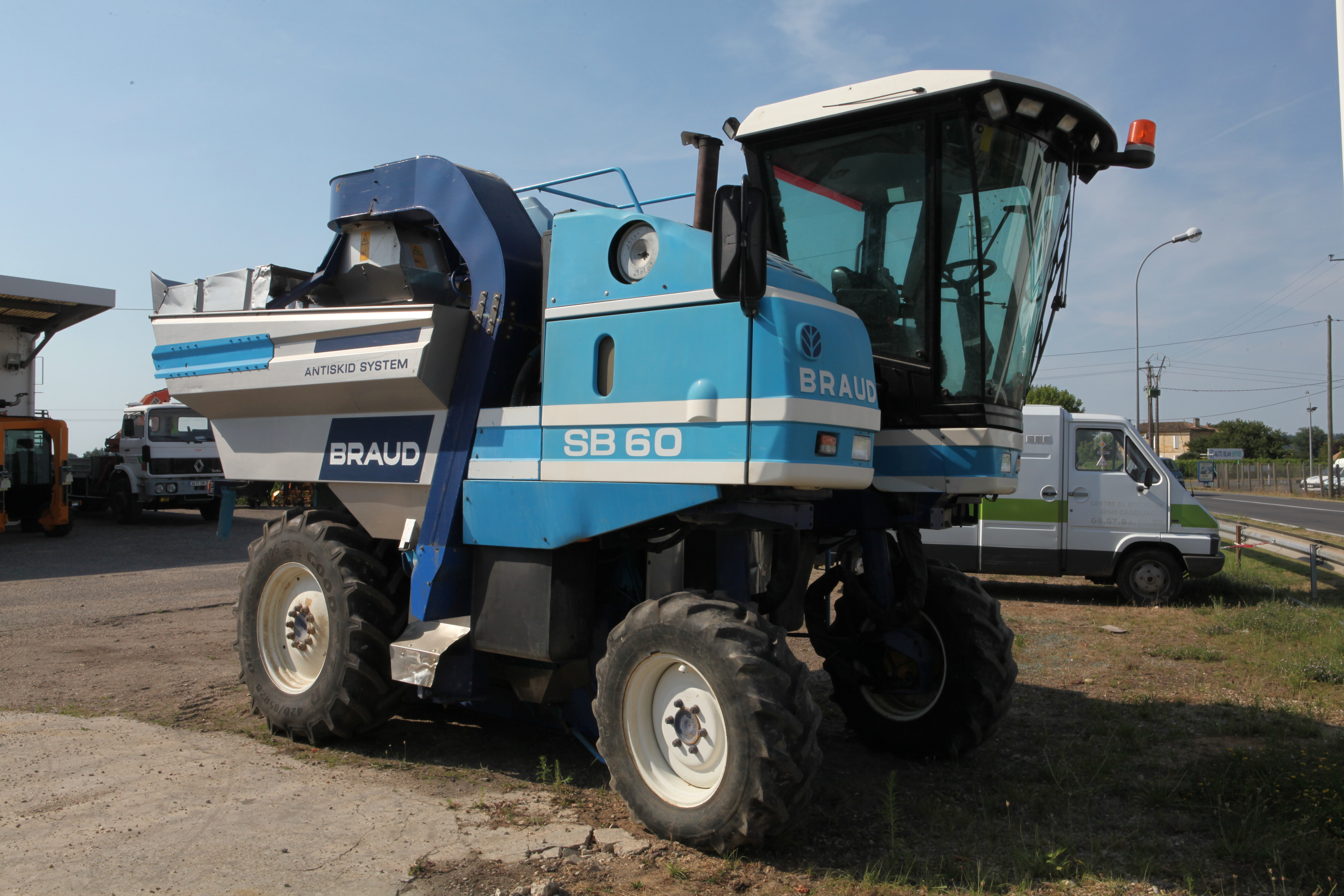
Braud SB 60 grape harvester

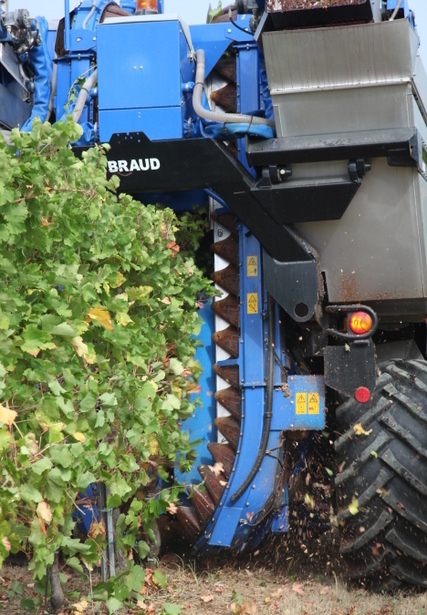
A Braud grape harvester shaking the grape vines to remove berries during harvest in Lombardy (Italy)

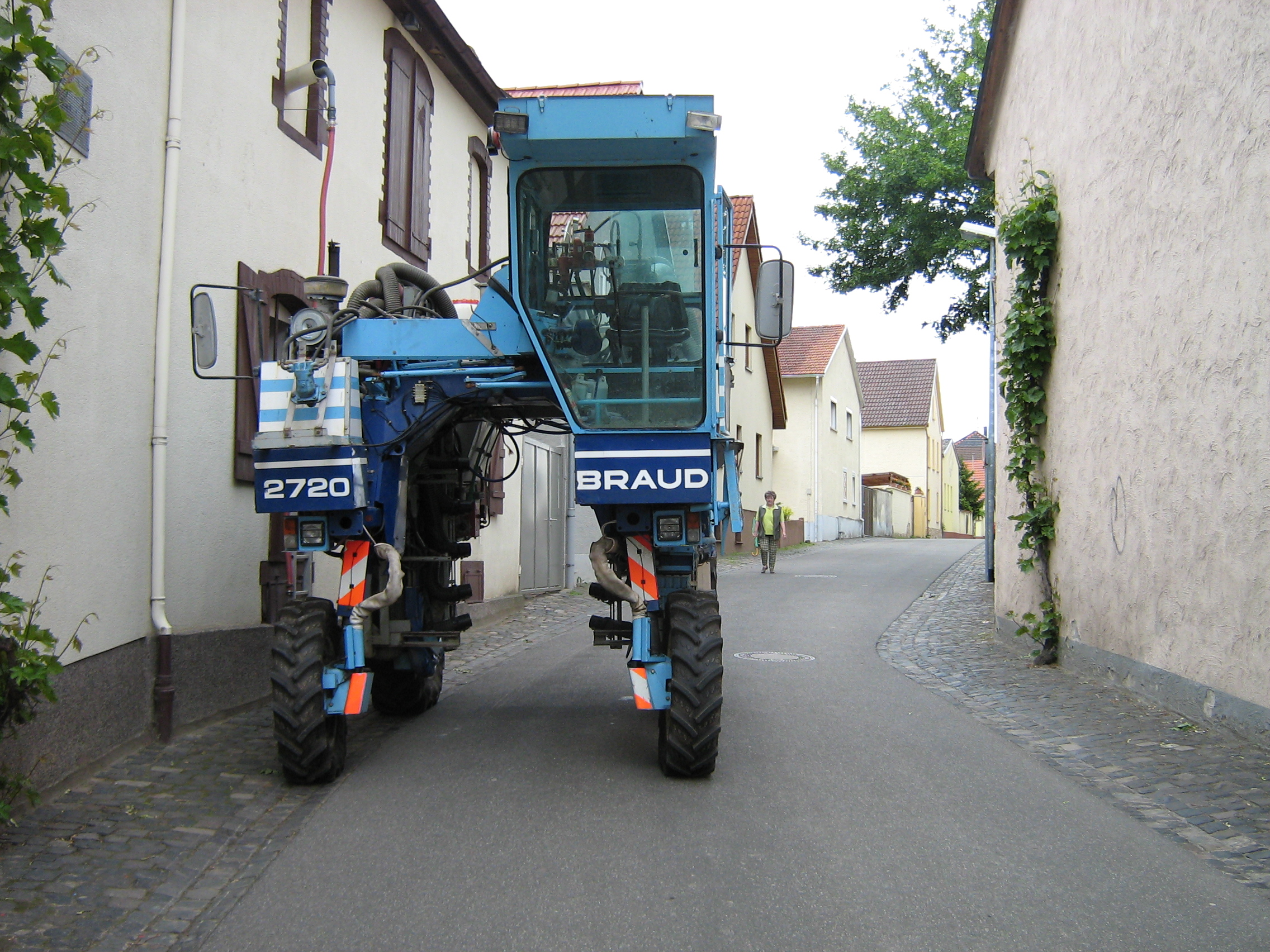
Braud 2720 grape harvester

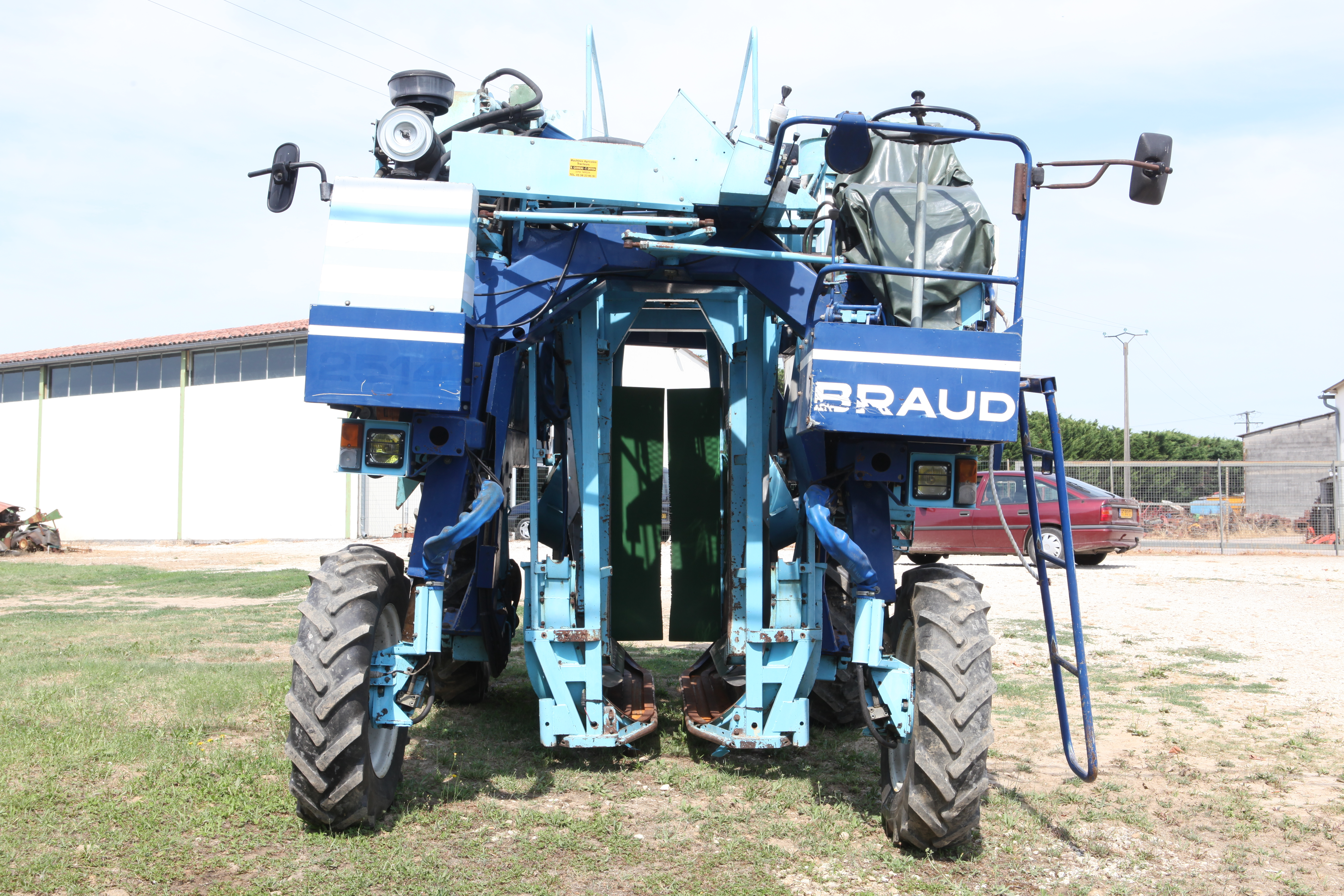
Braud 2514 grape harvester
