= Heston Community School =

Coordinates: 51.4838°N 0.3695°W

Location
- Heston Road; Heston; London, TW5 0QR; England

Information
- Type: Academy
- Established: 1932
- Local authority: Hounslow
- Department for Education URN: 138924 Tables
- Ofsted: Reports
- Headteacher: Ranjit Berdesha
- Gender: Coeducational
- Age: 11 to 19
- Enrolment: 1292
- Publication: N/A
- Website: https://www.hestoncommunityschool.co.uk/

Heston Community School is a coeducational secondary school and sixth form situated in Heston, London, England.

It caters for a wide range of children aged between 11 and 19, including those with a hearing impairment.

== History ==
The School opened on 19 October 1932 by the Charter Mayor, Councillor H J Nias MBE JP at a cost of £21,730 though the old Heston Schools had been built in 1861 by the Charter Mayor's father. There have been extensive improvements to the campus in more recent years, replacing over 20 'temporary' huts and creating new Teaching Areas. The Osterley Extension was opened on 2 April 1996 by Councillor Millie Blister, Deputy Mayor of Hounslow and the School's newest building, The Hogarth Building, which was built as part of the Heston School's Project at a cost of more than £10 million was officially opened in February 2010 by Councillor Peter Thompson, the then Leader of the Council though the Building had actually been in use since January of the same year.

The Heston Schools Project also saw the refurbishment of many areas of Heston Community School as well as the demolition of its Norwood Building to make way for the new Heston Primary School. At the same time, Heston Junior School was closed and demolished and Heston Infants and Nursery School closed though the original building was gutted and refurbished and now serves as Heston Community School's Dining Area. There is also a Community Sports Centre on the campus run by the Heston Community Academy Trust.

The School is recognised nationally (though not exclusively) for its work in the visual arts and in September 2004 gained the status of a Specialist Visual Arts School. It became a Foundation School in November 2010 forming a partnership with the National Deaf Children's Society and the University of the Arts London. These close partnerships have been maintained as the School moved into a new era gaining academy status on 1 November 2012.
