= Hesston, Pennsylvania =

Unincorporated community in Pennsylvania, US

- Unincorporated community
- Location within the state of Pennsylvania Hesston (the United States)
- Coordinates: 40°25′36″N 78°7′2″W
- Country: United States
- State: Pennsylvania
- County: Huntingdon
- Township: Penn
- Time zone: UTC-5 (Eastern (EST))
  - Summer (DST): UTC-4 (EDT)
- ZIP codes: 16647
- Area code: 814

Hesston is an unincorporated community in Penn Township in Huntingdon County, Pennsylvania, United States. Also located in Hesston is Raystown Lake. Hesston is the home of the Hesston Speedway. The community was originally called Pleasant Grove and Grafton.

== History ==
"On May 6, 1852, the Huntingdon and Broad Top Railroad and Coal Company was incorporated and on August 13, 1855, trains began running from Huntingdon to Bedford." through Penn Township.

The Village of Hesston was built on land previously owned by Jacob Fink and John Peightal. Andrew F. Grove erected the first house, and on May 26, 1869, named the place New Pleasant Grove. Through his efforts, a railroad station, an express office, and a post office were established. On April 14, 1873, the Postmaster General changed the name of Pleasant Grove to Grafton to avoid confusion in sending and receiving mail. At this time, the village had grown to twenty houses, a church, a store, a tannery, a wagon shop, a harness shop, a blacksmith shop, a steam flouring mill, a small food tavern, and a shoe shop.

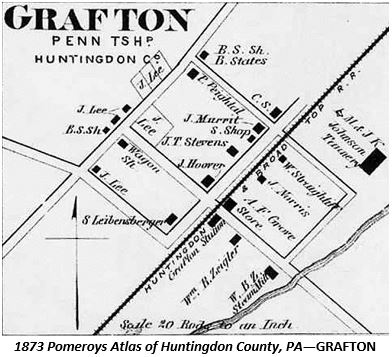
Village of Hesston in 1873

In 1885, "Robert Hare Powel & Company built a track from their quarries out from Grafton to the line of the Huntingdon & Broad Top railroad, one-half mile south of the station for the purpose of shipping limestone to their furnace at Saxton."

In the 1890s, the first telephones were installed in the village by the Raystown Branch Telephone Company.

As the population grew, so did the one-room school houses and churches in the village and surrounding township. "There was a doctor on 24-hour call who traveled by horse and buggy, and a midwife who delivered many babies."

On June 16, 1925, the Grafton Post Office changed to its present name, Hesston.

In 1947, the village was electrified when the Valley Rural Electric Cooperative strung the first lines through Penn Township."

The Huntingdon and Broad Top Railroad ceased operation on March 31, 1954.

In the 1970s, the Raystown Lake Dam was built to control the flood waters of the Juniata River. Through eminent domain, all of the families who lived in the valley of the Raystown Branch and on surrounding mountain ridges were moved. Over four hundred graves were respectfully reinterred at Jacob's Church Cemetery, Stone Church, and other cemeteries. Today, summer visitors come to enjoy Seven Points on Lake Raystown, other camp grounds, and rental houses in Penn Township.

The United States Post Office of Hesston, Pennsylvania, has maintained an office in the village since 1869 and is currently housed in the old general store.

Hesston is in the Huntingdon Area School District.
