= 1970 United States Senate election in Nebraska =

- November 3, 1970
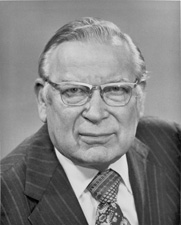

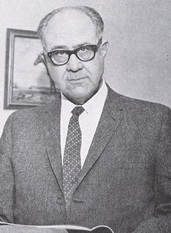
Nominee	Roman Hruska	Frank B. Morrison
Party	Republican	Democratic
Popular vote	240,894	217,681
Percentage	52.49%	47.43%
- County results Hruska: 50–60% 60–70% 70–80% Morrison: 50–60% 60–70%
U.S. senator before election
Roman Hruska
Republican
Elected U.S. Senator
Roman Hruska
Republican

The 1970 United States Senate election in Nebraska took place on November 3, 1970. Incumbent Republican Senator Roman Hruska ran for re-election and was challenged by former Governor Frank B. Morrison, the Democratic nominee, in a rematch of the 1958 race. Despite a Democratic victory in the gubernatorial election, Morrison was unable to defeat Hruska, who was re-elected to his final term in the Senate with 52% of the vote. Until the election of Deb Fischer in 2012, this was the last time a Republican was elected to this Senate seat. (Note: One Republican, David Karnes, was appointed to this seat in 1987 following the death of Hruska's successor, Ed Zorinsky, to finish out the seat; but was subsequently defeated in 1988 by Bob Kerrey.)

== Democratic primary ==
=== Candidates ===
- Frank B. Morrison, former Governor of Nebraska
- Wallace C. Peterson, economics professor at the University of Nebraska–Lincoln
- David J. Thomas, Doane College economics and business law professor and 1962 and 1966 Democratic nominee for Attorney General

=== Results ===
Democratic primary results
Party	Candidate	Votes	%
Democratic	Frank B. Morrison	85,293	67.24%
Democratic	Wallace C. Peterson	34,856	27.48%
Democratic	David J. Thomas	6,610	5.21%
Democratic	Others	88	0.07%
Total votes		126,847	100.00%

== Republican primary ==
=== Candidates ===
- Roman Hruska, incumbent Senator
- Otis Glebe, Lincoln farmer

=== Results ===
Republican primary
Party	Candidate	Votes	%
Republican	Roman Hruska (inc.)	159,057	85.54%
Republican	Otis Glebe	26,627	14.32%
Republican	Others	265	0.14%
Total votes		185,949	100.00%

== Results ==
1970 United States Senate election in Nebraska
Party	Candidate	Votes	%	±%
Republican	Roman Hruska (inc.)	240,894	52.49%	−8.88%
Democratic	Frank B. Morrison	217,681	47.43%	+8.81%
Write-in		391	0.00%	—
Majority		23,213	5.06%	−17.69%
Total votes		458,966	100.00%	
Republican hold				

=== By county ===
County	Roman Hruska Republican		Frank B. Morrison Democratic		Various candidates Other parties		Margin		Total
County	#	%	#	%	#	%	#	%	Total
Adams	4,345	46.72%	4,952	53.25%	3	0.03%	607	6.53%	9,300
Antelope	2,041	55.00%	1,662	44.79%	8	0.22%	379	10.21%	3,711
Arthur	198	67.12%	97	32.88%	0	0.00%	101	34.24%	295
Banner	241	58.07%	174	41.93%	0	0.00%	67	16.14%	415
Blaine	295	72.66%	111	27.34%	0	0.00%	184	45.32%	406
Boone	1,566	51.23%	1,491	48.77%	0	0.00%	75	2.45%	3,057
Box Butte	2,064	59.74%	1,391	40.26%	0	0.00%	673	19.48%	3,455
Boyd	959	55.43%	771	44.57%	0	0.00%	188	10.87%	1,730
Brown	737	60.21%	487	39.79%	0	0.00%	250	20.42%	1,224
Buffalo	4,862	55.36%	3,905	44.47%	15	0.17%	957	10.90%	8,782
Burt	1,926	61.93%	1,184	38.07%	0	0.00%	742	23.86%	3,110
Butler	1,481	38.76%	2,340	61.24%	0	0.00%	859	22.48%	3,821
Cass	2,732	51.62%	2,561	48.38%	0	0.00%	171	3.23%	5,293
Cedar	2,009	47.22%	2,246	52.78%	0	0.00%	237	5.57%	4,255
Chase	857	58.50%	608	41.50%	0	0.00%	249	17.00%	1,465
Cherry	1,591	64.99%	857	35.01%	0	0.00%	734	29.98%	2,448
Cheyenne	1,650	57.13%	1,238	42.87%	0	0.00%	412	14.27%	2,888
Clay	1,541	53.84%	1,321	46.16%	0	0.00%	220	7.69%	2,862
Colfax	1,671	49.00%	1,738	50.97%	1	0.03%	67	1.96%	3,410
Cuming	2,318	56.51%	1,784	43.49%	0	0.00%	534	13.02%	4,102
Custer	3,460	62.30%	2,094	37.70%	0	0.00%	1,366	24.59%	5,554
Dakota	1,940	50.08%	1,934	49.92%	0	0.00%	6	0.15%	3,874
Dawes	1,869	64.05%	1,049	35.95%	0	0.00%	820	28.10%	2,918
Dawson	3,521	61.37%	2,216	38.63%	0	0.00%	1,305	22.75%	5,737
Deuel	644	63.32%	373	36.68%	0	0.00%	271	26.65%	1,017
Dixon	1,532	58.32%	1,095	41.68%	0	0.00%	437	16.63%	2,627
Dodge	6,089	53.90%	5,208	46.10%	0	0.00%	881	7.80%	11,297
Douglas	56,048	50.07%	55,768	49.82%	118	0.11%	280	0.25%	111,934
Dundy	729	64.57%	400	35.43%	0	0.00%	329	29.14%	1,129
Fillmore	1,787	51.50%	1,683	48.50%	0	0.00%	104	3.00%	3,470
Franklin	1,025	55.17%	833	44.83%	0	0.00%	192	10.33%	1,858
Frontier	874	57.50%	646	42.50%	0	0.00%	228	15.00%	1,520
Furnas	1,681	61.73%	1,042	38.27%	0	0.00%	639	23.47%	2,723
Gage	3,454	42.79%	4,618	57.21%	0	0.00%	1,164	14.42%	8,072
Garden	918	67.80%	436	32.20%	0	0.00%	482	35.60%	1,354
Garfield	725	68.72%	330	31.28%	0	0.00%	395	36.46%	1,055
Gosper	458	55.38%	369	44.62%	0	0.00%	89	10.76%	827
Grant	261	74.15%	91	25.85%	0	0.00%	170	48.30%	352
Greeley	590	35.98%	1050	64.02%	0	0.00%	460	28.95%	1640
Hall	5682	47.25%	6344	52.75%	0	0.00%	662	5.50%	12026
Hamilton	1702	57.17%	1275	42.83%	0	0.00%	427	14.34%	2977
Harlan	1071	56.79%	814	43.16%	1	0.05%	257	13.63%	1886
Hayes	410	61.38%	258	38.62%	0	0.00%	152	22.75%	668
Hitchcock	914	58.97%	636	41.03%	0	0.00%	278	17.94%	1550
Holt	2667	56.65%	2041	43.35%	0	0.00%	626	13.30%	4708
Hooker	269	75.14%	89	24.86%	0	0.00%	180	50.28%	358
Howard	996	39.81%	1506	60.19%	0	0.00%	510	20.38%	2502
Jefferson	2307	53.03%	2042	46.94%	1	0.02%	265	6.09%	4350
Johnson	1077	48.34%	1151	51.66%	0	0.00%	74	3.32%	2228
Kearney	1329	52.41%	1207	47.59%	0	0.00%	122	4.81%	2536
Keith	1469	57.54%	1084	42.46%	0	0.00%	385	15.08%	2553
Keya Paha	378	63.53%	217	36.47%	0	0.00%	161	27.06%	595
Kimball	1111	63.05%	651	36.95%	0	0.00%	460	26.11%	1762
Knox	2345	60.58%	1526	39.42%	0	0.00%	819	21.16%	3871
Lancaster	24117	50.33%	23571	49.19%	229	0.48%	546	1.14%	47917
Lincoln	4084	46.42%	4714	53.58%	0	0.00%	630	7.16%	8798
Logan	214	56.76%	163	43.24%	0	0.00%	51	13.53%	377
Loup	247	65.69%	129	34.31%	0	0.00%	118	31.38%	376
McPherson	195	66.78%	97	33.22%	0	0.00%	98	33.56%	292
Madison	5127	58.84%	3586	41.16%	0	0.00%	1541	17.69%	8713
Merrick	1453	52.78%	1299	47.18%	1	0.04%	154	5.59%	2753
Morrill	1164	56.20%	907	43.80%	0	0.00%	257	12.41%	2071
Nance	1001	48.88%	1047	51.12%	0	0.00%	46	2.25%	2048
Nemaha	1738	58.03%	1257	41.97%	0	0.00%	481	16.06%	2995
Nuckolls	1334	46.42%	1540	53.58%	0	0.00%	206	7.17%	2874
Otoe	3219	58.61%	2271	41.35%	2	0.04%	948	17.26%	5492
Pawnee	957	53.73%	824	46.27%	0	0.00%	133	7.47%	1781
Perkins	825	55.04%	674	44.96%	0	0.00%	151	10.07%	1499
Phelps	2101	60.50%	1372	39.50%	0	0.00%	729	20.99%	3473
Pierce	1728	55.38%	1392	44.62%	0	0.00%	336	10.77%	3120
Platte	4569	47.77%	4996	52.23%	0	0.00%	427	4.46%	9565
Polk	1336	53.18%	1174	46.74%	2	0.08%	162	6.45%	2512
Red Willow	2168	55.12%	1765	44.88%	0	0.00%	403	10.25%	3933
Richardson	2284	50.79%	2213	49.21%	0	0.00%	71	1.58%	4497
Rock	533	66.21%	272	33.79%	0	0.00%	261	32.42%	805
Saline	1781	38.24%	2877	61.76%	0	0.00%	1096	23.53%	4658
Sarpy	5397	50.66%	5248	49.26%	8	0.08%	149	1.40%	10653
Saunders	2987	49.99%	2988	50.01%	0	0.00%	1	0.02%	5975
Scotts Bluff	4563	57.84%	3326	42.16%	0	0.00%	1237	15.68%	7889
Seward	2350	53.97%	2004	46.03%	0	0.00%	346	7.95%	4354
Sheridan	1626	66.80%	808	33.20%	0	0.00%	818	33.61%	2434
Sherman	692	40.95%	998	59.05%	0	0.00%	306	18.11%	1690
Sioux	438	67.08%	215	32.92%	0	0.00%	223	34.15%	653
Stanton	1081	56.83%	821	43.17%	0	0.00%	260	13.67%	1902
Thayer	1713	54.96%	1404	45.04%	0	0.00%	309	9.91%	3117
Thomas	308	63.90%	174	36.10%	0	0.00%	134	27.80%	482
Thurston	1061	51.58%	996	48.42%	0	0.00%	65	3.16%	2057
Valley	1366	56.47%	1053	43.53%	0	0.00%	313	12.94%	2419
Washington	2561	57.40%	1901	42.60%	0	0.00%	660	14.79%	4462
Wayne	1790	61.81%	1106	38.19%	0	0.00%	684	23.62%	2896
Webster	1044	45.31%	1260	54.69%	0	0.00%	216	9.38%	2304
Wheeler	260	58.56%	184	41.44%	0	0.00%	76	17.12%	444
York	3066	59.78%	2061	40.18%	2	0.04%	1005	19.59%	5129
Totals	240,894	52.49%	217,681	47.43%	391	0.09%	23,213	5.06%	458,966
