= 1954 United States Senate special election in Nebraska =

1954 United States Senate Class I special election in Nebraska
- November 2, 1954
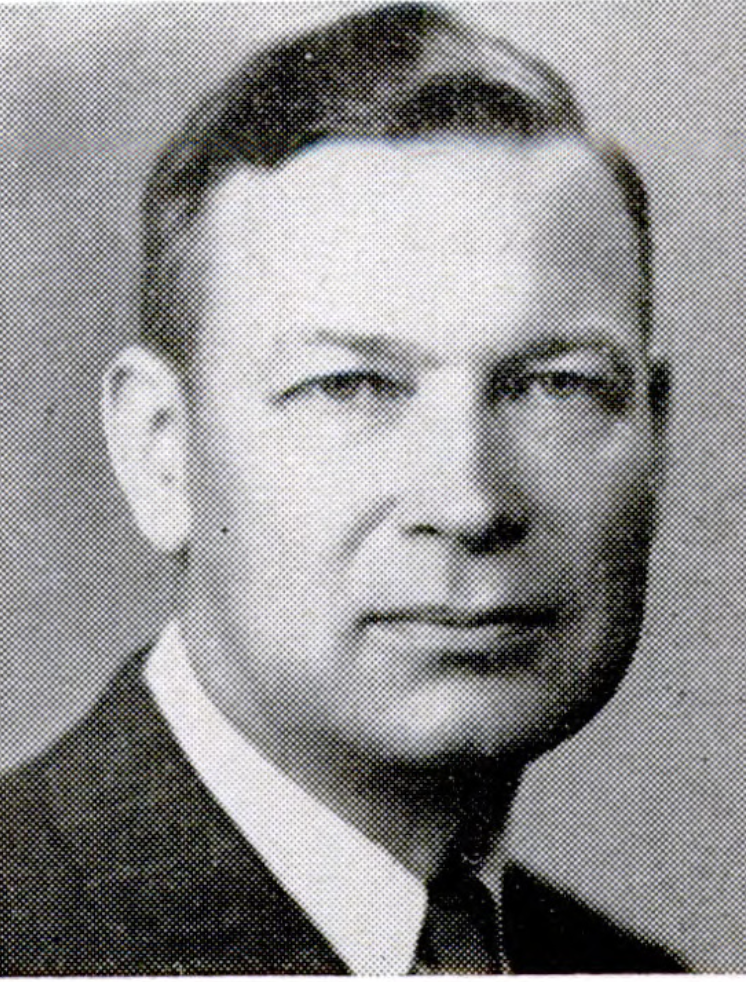

Nominee	Roman Hruska	James F. Green
Party	Republican	Democratic
Popular vote	250,341	160,881
Percentage	60.88%	39.12%
- County results Hruska: 50–60% 60–70% 70–80% Green: 50–60%
U.S. senator before election
Samuel W. Reynolds
Republican
Elected U.S. Senator
Roman Hruska
Republican

The 1954 United States Senate special election in Nebraska for the Class I Senate seat took place on November 2, 1954. Republican Senator Hugh A. Butler, who was elected to a six-year term in 1952, died on July 1, 1954. Governor Robert B. Crosby appointed Samuel W. Reynolds to replace him and a special election was held to fill the remaining four years of Butler's term. Congressman Roman Hruska won the Republican primary unopposed and faced the Democratic nominee, James F. Green, a member of the Metropolitan Utilities District, in the general election. Hruska defeated Green in a landslide, winning 61% of the vote.

Two other Senate elections for the state's Class II Senate seat were held on the same day: a regular election for a six-year term and a special election to fill out the remaining two months of the previous term.

== Democratic primary ==
=== Candidates ===
- James F. Green, member of the Metropolitan Utilities District Board of Governors

=== Results ===
Democratic primary results
Party	Candidate	Votes	%
Democratic	James F. Green	60,469	99.95%
Democratic	Scattering	29	0.05%
Total votes		60,498	100.00%

== Republican primary ==
=== Candidates ===
- Roman Hruska, U.S. Representative from Nebraska's 2nd congressional district

=== Results ===
Republican primary
Party	Candidate	Votes	%
Republican	Roman Hruska	118,084	99.77%
Republican	Scattering	272	0.23%
Total votes		118,356	100.00%

== General election ==
1954 United States Senate Class I special election in Nebraska
Party	Candidate	Votes	%	±%
Republican	Roman Hruska	250,341	60.88%	−2.69%
Democratic	James F. Green	160,881	39.12%	+2.70%
Write-in		3	0.00%	—
Majority		89,460	21.76%	−5.39%
Total votes		411,225	100.00%	
Republican hold				
