= 1976 United States Senate election in Nebraska =

- November 2, 1976
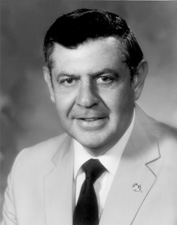

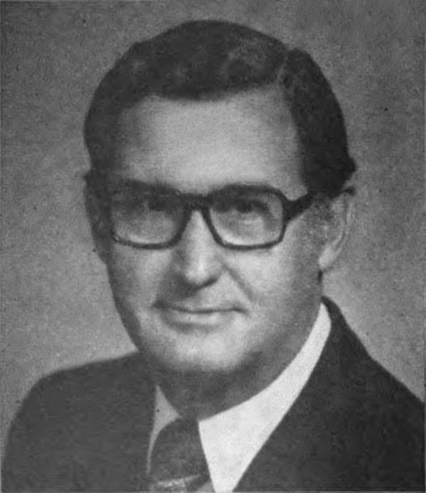
| Nominee | Edward Zorinsky | John Y. McCollister |
| Party | Democratic | Republican |
| Popular vote | 313,805 | 279,284 |
| Percentage | 52.89% | 47.07% |
- County results Zorinsky: 50–60% 60–70% 70–80% McCollister: 50–60% 60–70% 70–80%
U.S. senator before election
Roman Hruska
Republican
Elected U.S. Senator
Edward Zorinsky
Democratic

The 1976 United States Senate election in Nebraska took place on November 2, 1976. Incumbent Republican senator Roman Hruska decided to retire instead of seeking another term. Omaha Mayor Edward Zorinsky, a Republican, switched to the Democratic Party and narrowly won the Democratic primary, and then defeated Congressman John Y. McCollister, the Republican nominee, in the general election. Zorinsky became the first Democrat to win a Senate election in Nebraska since 1934, and the first Jewish person elected to statewide office in the state.

== Democratic primary ==
=== Candidates ===
- Hess Dyas, former chairman of the Nebraska Democratic Party, 1974 Democratic nominee for Nebraska's 1st congressional district
- Leonore Etchison, economics graduate student at the University of Nebraska–Lincoln
- Edward Zorinsky, mayor of Omaha

=== Results ===
Democratic primary results
| Party | Candidate | Votes | % |
|---|---|---|---|
| Democratic | Edward Zorinsky | 79,988 | 48.58% |
| Democratic | Hess Dyas | 77,384 | 46.99% |
| Democratic | Lenore R. Etchison | 7,194 | 4.37% |
| Democratic | Scattering | 102 | 0.06% |
| Total votes | | 164,668 | 100.00% |

== Republican primary ==
=== Candidates ===
- John Y. McCollister, U.S. representative from Nebraska's 2nd congressional district
- Richard Proud, former speaker of the Nebraska Legislature

=== Results ===
Republican primary
| Party | Candidate | Votes | % |
|---|---|---|---|
| Republican | John Y. McCollister | 150,732 | 78.35% |
| Republican | Richard Proud | 41,519 | 21.58% |
| Republican | Scattering | 122 | 0.06% |
| Total votes | | 192,373 | 100.00% |

== General election ==
1976 United States Senate election in Nebraska
| Party | Candidate | Votes | % | ±% |
|---|---|---|---|---|
| Democratic | Edward Zorinsky | 313,805 | 52.89% | +5.46% |
| Republican | John Y. McCollister | 279,284 | 47.07% | −5.42% |
| Write-in | | 221 | 0.04% | — |
| Majority | | 34,521 | 5.82% | +0.76% |
| Total votes | | 593,310 | 100.00% | |
| Democratic gain from Republican | | | | |

== See also ==
- 1976 United States Senate elections
