= 2012 United States Senate election in Nebraska =

- November 6, 2012
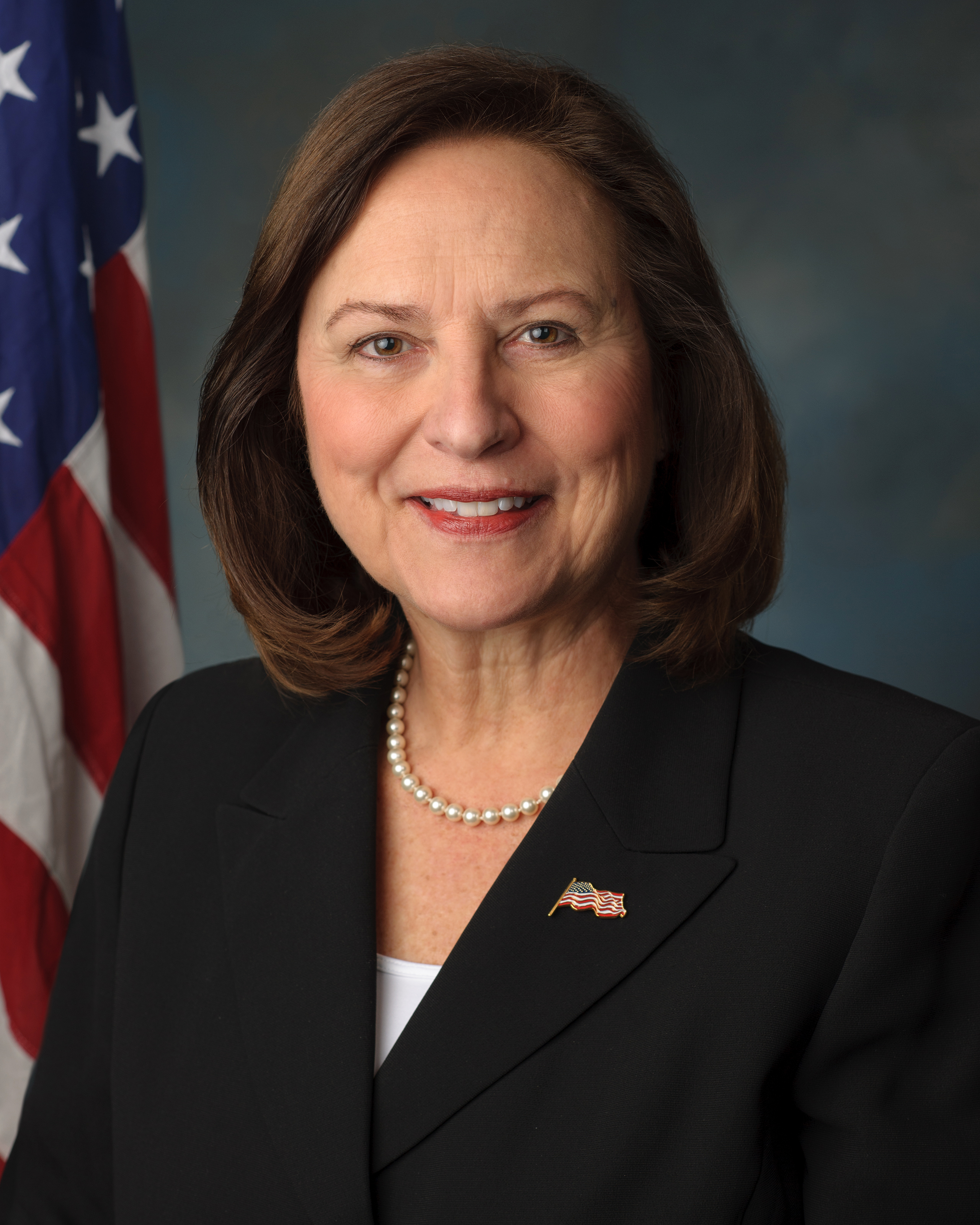

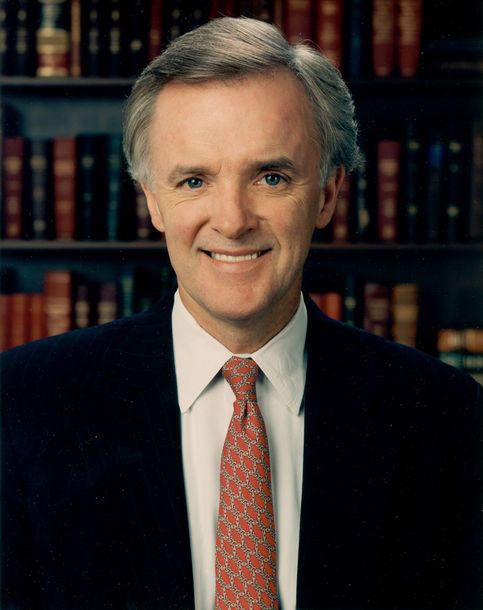
Nominee	Deb Fischer	Bob Kerrey
Party	Republican	Democratic
Popular vote	455,593	332,979
Percentage	57.77%	42.23%
- Fischer: 50–60% 60–70% 70–80% 80–90% Kerrey: 50–60%
U.S. senator before election
Ben Nelson
Democratic
Elected U.S. Senator
Deb Fischer
Republican

The 2012 United States Senate election in Nebraska took place on November 6, 2012, concurrently with the 2012 U.S. presidential election, other elections to the United States Senate and House of Representatives, and various state and local elections.

Incumbent Democratic senator Ben Nelson chose to retire instead of seeking a third term. Democrat Bob Kerrey, who held this seat from 1989 to 2001, and Republican state Senator Deb Fischer won their respective parties' primary elections on May 15, 2012.

Fischer won the general election with 57.8% of the vote, marking the first time since 1970 that a Republican was elected to Nebraska's Class 1 Senate seat. She was the first woman to be elected in the Senate since Hazel Abel in the 1954 special election, and as well as the first woman to be elected to a full Senate term in the state's history. This was the only Republican flip of the 2012 U.S. Senate elections. Fischer was sworn in on January 3, 2013, marking the first time since Roman Hruska resigned in December 1976 that Republicans simultaneously held both of Nebraska’s U.S. Senate seats.

== Democratic primary ==
=== Candidates ===
==== Declared ====
- Bob Kerrey, former U.S. senator and former governor of Nebraska (initially declined)
- Steven Lustgarten, video production company owner
- Larry Marvin, landlord and perennial candidate
- Sherman Yates

==== Withdrew ====
- Chuck Hassebrook, regent of the University of Nebraska

==== Declined ====
- Chris Beutler, mayor of Lincoln
- Jane Kleeb, founder and director of Bold Nebraska
- Scott Kleeb, businessman, Democratic nominee for the 3rd congressional district in 2006 and for the U.S. Senate in 2008
- Steve Lathrop, state senator
- Ben Nelson, incumbent U.S. senator
- Kim Robak, former lieutenant governor

=== Endorsements ===
Bob Kerrey

U.S. senators

- Warren Rudman, former U.S. senator from New Hampshire (Republican)

Individuals

- David Koechner, actor

=== Results ===
Democratic primary results
Party	Candidate	Votes	%
Democratic	Bob Kerrey	66,586	80.98%
Democratic	Chuck Hassebrook	9,886	12.02%
Democratic	Steven P. Lustgarten	2,177	2.65%
Democratic	Larry Marvin	2,076	2.52%
Democratic	Sherman Yates	1,500	1.82%
Total votes		82,225	100.00%

== Republican primary ==
=== Candidates ===
- Jon Bruning, attorney general of Nebraska
- Sharyn Elander
- Deb Fischer, state senator
- Pat Flynn, financial adviser
- Don Stenberg, treasurer of Nebraska, former attorney general of Nebraska, nominee for this seat in 2000 and candidate for this seat in 2006
- Spencer Zimmerman, truck driver and Air Force veteran

==== Declined ====
- Bob Bennie, businessman
- Rex Fisher, businessman
- Mike Flood, speaker of the Nebraska Legislature
- Jeff Fortenberry, U.S. representative
- Dave Heineman, governor of Nebraska
- Kay Orr, former governor of Nebraska
- Mike Simmonds, businessman
- Adrian Smith, U.S. representative
- Lee Terry, U.S. representative

=== Polling ===
Poll source	Date(s) administered	Sample size	Margin of error	Jon Bruning	Sharyn Elander	Deb Fischer	Pat Flynn	Don Stenberg	Spencer Zimmerman	Undecided
Public Policy Polling	January 26–27, 2011	519	±4.3%	47%	–	6%	7%	19%	–	20%
Public Policy Polling	September 30 – October 2, 2011	400	±4.9%	37%	–	14%	6%	16%	–	27%
Public Policy Polling	March 22–25, 2012	440	±4.7%	46%	3%	12%	4%	18%	0%	18%
We Ask America	May 6, 2012	1,173	±2.9%	42.2%	3.4%	25.9%	4%	22.5%	2%	–
We Ask America	May 13, 2012	1,109	±2.95%	34%	4%	39%	3%	18%	2%	–
Public Policy Polling	May 14, 2012	272	±5.9%	33%	1%	37%	2%	17%	1%	7%

=== Endorsements ===
Jon Bruning

Individuals

- Joe Arpaio, sheriff of Maricopa County, Arizona
- Mike Flood, speaker of the Nebraska Legislature
- Mike Huckabee, former governor of Arkansas
- Rick Santorum, former U.S. senator from Pennsylvania
- Bill Schuette, attorney general of Michigan

Organizations

- American Future Fund
- Nebraska Fraternal Order of Police
- Nebraska Right to Life
- Tea Party Express
- United States Chamber of Commerce
Deb Fischer

Individuals

- Herman Cain, former presidential candidate
- Jeff Fortenberry, U.S. representative for Nebraska's 1st congressional district
- Kay Orr, former governor of Nebraska
- Sarah Palin, former governor of Alaska and 2008 Republican vice presidential nominee
- Todd Palin, Sarah Palin's husband
- Joe Ricketts, businessman, owner of the Chicago Cubs

Organizations

- Nebraska Right to Life
Don Stenberg

Individuals

- Ken Blackwell, former secretary of state of Ohio
- Jim DeMint, U.S. senator from South Carolina
- Erick Erickson, managing editor of RedState
- Mike Lee, U.S. senator from Utah
- Mark Levin, radio talk show host
- Edwin Meese, former U.S. attorney general
- Rand Paul, U.S. senator from Kentucky

Organizations

- Club for Growth
- Eagle Forum
- Family Research Council
- FreedomWorks
- Gun Owners of America
- Nebraska Right to Life
- Nebraskans United for Life
- Republican National Coalition for Life

=== Results ===
Results by county: Fischer: 30–40%; 40–50%; 50–60%; 60–70%; 70–80%; Bruning: 30–40%; 40–50%; 60–70%; Flynn: 30–40%

Republican primary results
Party	Candidate	Votes	%
Republican	Deb Fischer	79,941	40.99%
Republican	Jon Bruning	70,067	35.92%
Republican	Don Stenberg	36,727	18.83%
Republican	Pat Flynn	5,413	2.78%
Republican	Spencer Zimmerman	1,601	0.82%
Republican	Sharyn Elander	1,294	0.66%
Total votes		195,043	100.00%

== General election ==
=== Candidates ===
- Deb Fischer (Republican), state senator
- Bob Kerrey (Democrat), former U.S. senator and former governor of Nebraska

=== Debates ===
The first debate took place at the Heartland Events Center during the Nebraska State Fair at 4 p.m. Saturday, August 25, 2012. Kerrey and Fischer participated.

The second debate took place on September 28, 2012, KETV-TV, Chamber of Commerce of Greater Omaha. Kerrey and Fischer participated.

The third debate took place on October 1, 2012, NET-TV. Kerrey and Fischer participated. Topics included agriculture policy, the economy, taxes and education.

External links

- Complete video at Grand Island Independent, first debate, August 25, 2012
- Complete video of debate, September 28, 2012 - C-SPAN
- Complete video of debate, October 1, 2012 - C-SPAN

=== Fundraising ===
Candidate (party)	Receipts	Disbursements	Cash on hand	Debt
Bob Kerrey (D)	$4,877,704	$4,582,224	$295,480	$0
Deb Fischer (R)	$4,536,837	$3,472,721	$1,458,122	$65,000
Source: Federal Election Commission

==== Top contributors ====
Bob Kerrey	Contribution	Deb Fischer	Contribution
Rural Media Group	$62,500	Elliott Management Corporation	$29,413
MacAndrews & Forbes	$51,000	Hawkins Construction	$20,000
Tenet Healthcare	$25,650	Kelly PAC	$20,000
Nix, Patterson & Roach	$25,000	Tenaska Energy	$17,500
Allen & Company	$22,500	Werner Enterprises	$15,250
Kirkland & Ellis	$21,500	T&L Irrigation	$13,200
Level 3 Communications	$17,000	Union Pacific	$11,500
Genworth Financial	$16,000	Pinnacle Financial Partners	$10,500
Williams Kherkher	$16,000	21st Century Majority Fund	$10,000
Bank of America	$15,250	AG Processing	$10,000

==== Top industries ====
Bob Kerrey	Contribution	Deb Fischer	Contribution
Lawyers/law firms	$293,434	Leadership PACs	$165,500
Retired	$219,224	Retired	$124,546
Leadership PACs	$203,500	Agribusiness	$105,052
Financial institutions	$182,150	Commercial banks	$54,990
Entertainment industry	$119,000	Financial institutions	$54,416
Lobbyists	$104,400	General contractors	$54,300
Real estate	$87,675	Real estate	$38,000
Manufacturing & distributing	$61,700	Insurance	$36,000
Education	$53,000	Health professionals	$31,850
Insurance	$51,500	Electric utilities	$29,900

=== Predictions ===
Source	Ranking	As of
The Cook Political Report	Lean R (flip)	November 1, 2012
Sabato's Crystal Ball	Likely R (flip)	November 5, 2012
Rothenberg Political Report	Likely R (flip)	November 2, 2012
Real Clear Politics	Lean R (flip)	November 5, 2012

=== Polling ===
Poll source	Date(s) administered	Sample size	Margin of error	Bob Kerrey (D)	Deb Fischer (R)	Other	Undecided
Rasmussen Reports	March 5, 2012	500	±4.5%	34%	46%	10%	10%
Public Policy Polling	March 22–25, 2012	1,028	±3.1%	38%	48%	—	14%
Rasmussen Reports	May 16, 2012	500	±4.5%	38%	56%	2%	3%
WeAskAmerica	August 14, 2012	1,273	±2.8%	34%	55%	—	11%
Omaha World-Herald	September 17–20, 2012	800	±3.5%	42%	52%	—	6%
Pharos Research	October 19–21, 2012	783	±3.5%	46%	48%	—	6%
Omaha World-Herald	October 23–25, 2012	800	±3.5%	45%	48%	—	7%
We Ask America	November 1, 2012	1,178	±3.0%	41%	54%	—	5%

Hypothetical polling

With Kerrey

Poll source	Date(s) administered	Sample size	Margin of error	Bob Kerrey (D)	Jon Bruning (R)	Other	Undecided
Magellan Strategies	January 10–11, 2012	675	±3.77%	40%	51%	–	9%
Rasmussen Reports	March 5, 2012	500	±4.5%	33%	55%	4%	7%
Public Policy Polling	March 22–25, 2012	1,028	±3.1%	37%	54%	–	9%

Poll source	Date(s) administered	Sample size	Margin of error	Bob Kerrey (D)	Don Stenberg (R)	Other	Undecided
Magellan Strategies	January 10–11, 2012	675	±3.77%	39%	47%	–	14%
Rasmussen Reports	March 5, 2012	500	±4.5%	34%	52%	5%	9%
Public Policy Polling	March 22–25, 2012	1,028	±3.1%	38%	52%	–	10%

With Lathrop

Poll source	Date(s) administered	Sample size	Margin of error	Steve Lathrop (D)	Jon Bruning (R)	Other	Undecided
Magellan Strategies	January 10–11, 2012	675	±3.77%	29%	52%	–	19%

Poll source	Date(s) administered	Sample size	Margin of error	Steve Lathrop (D)	Don Stenberg (R)	Other	Undecided
Magellan Strategies	January 10–11, 2012	675	±3.77%	27%	52%	–	21%

With Nelson

Poll source	Date(s) administered	Sample size	Margin of error	Ben Nelson (D)	Jon Bruning (R)	Other	Undecided
Magellan Strategies	December 15, 2010	1,789	±2.3%	38%	52%	––	10%
Public Policy Polling	January 26–27, 2011	977	±3.1%	39%	50%	––	11%
Public Policy Polling	September 30 – October 2, 2011	739	±3.6%	42%	46%	––	12%
Magellan Strategies	November 20–21, 2011	645	±3.9%	39%	45%	––	16%

Poll source	Date(s) administered	Sample size	Margin of error	Ben Nelson (D)	Deb Fischer (R)	Other	Undecided
Public Policy Polling	January 26–27, 2011	977	±3.1%	42%	35%	––	22%
Public Policy Polling	September 30 – October 2, 2011	739	±3.6%	41%	39%	––	20%
Magellan Strategies	November 20–21, 2011	645	±3.9%	41%	35%	––	24%

Poll source	Date(s) administered	Sample size	Margin of error	Ben Nelson (D)	Pat Flynn (R)	Other	Undecided
Public Policy Polling	January 26–27, 2011	977	±3.1%	42%	33%	––	24%
Public Policy Polling	September 30 – October 2, 2011	739	±3.6%	43%	36%	––	21%

Poll source	Date(s) administered	Sample size	Margin of error	Ben Nelson (D)	Dave Heineman (R)	Other	Undecided
Magellan Strategies	November 20–21, 2011	645	±3.9%	33%	51%	––	16%

Poll source	Date(s) administered	Sample size	Margin of error	Ben Nelson (D)	Don Stenberg (R)	Other	Undecided
Magellan Strategies	December 15, 2010	1,789	±2.3%	40%	46%	––	14%
Public Policy Polling	January 26–27, 2011	977	±3.1%	41%	45%	––	14%
Public Policy Polling	September 30 – October 2, 2011	739	±3.6%	41%	44%	––	15%
Magellan Strategies	November 20–21, 2011	645	±3.9%	40%	41%	––	19%

With Robak

Poll source	Date(s) administered	Sample size	Margin of error	Kim Robak (D)	Jon Bruning (R)	Other	Undecided
Magellan Strategies	January 10–11, 2012	675	±3.77%	34%	51%	–	15%

Poll source	Date(s) administered	Sample size	Margin of error	Kim Robak (D)	Don Stenberg (R)	Other	Undecided
Magellan Strategies	January 10–11, 2012	675	±3.77%	32%	50%	–	18%

=== Results ===
2012 United States Senate election in Nebraska
Party	Candidate	Votes	%	±%
Republican	Deb Fischer	455,593	57.77%	+21.65%
Democratic	Bob Kerrey	332,979	42.23%	−21.65%
Majority		122,614	15.54%	−12.22%
Total votes		788,572	100.00%	
Republican gain from Democratic				

==== By county ====
From Secretary of State of Nebraska

County	Deb Fischer Republican		Bob Kerrey Democratic		Total votes
County	%	#	%	#	Total votes
Adams	64.65%	8,170	35.35%	4,468	12,638
Antelope	81.32%	2,625	18.68%	603	3,228
Arthur	86.74%	229	13.26%	35	264
Banner	84.91%	349	15.09%	62	411
Blaine	89.23%	265	10.77%	32	297
Boone	76.31%	2,139	23.69%	664	2,803
Box Butte	60.41%	2,838	39.59%	1,860	4,698
Boyd	80.36%	851	19.64%	208	1,059
Brown	86.80%	1,342	13.20%	204	1,546
Buffalo	70.01%	13,491	29.99%	5,779	19,270
Burt	59.55%	1,977	40.45%	1,343	3,320
Butler	68.86%	2,642	31.14%	1,195	3,837
Cass	59.25%	7,153	40.75%	4,919	12,072
Cedar	70.31%	3,041	29.69%	1,284	4,325
Chase	83.57%	1,546	16.43%	304	1,850
Cherry	77.91%	2,328	22.09%	660	2,988
Cheyenne	72.54%	3,344	27.46%	1,266	4,610
Clay	74.52%	2,194	25.48%	750	2,944
Colfax	65.23%	1,992	34.77%	1,062	3,054
Cuming	73.00%	2,893	27.00%	1,070	3,963
Custer	80.78%	4,439	19.22%	1,056	5,495
Dakota	45.63%	2,770	54.37%	3,300	6,070
Dawes	64.86%	2,405	35.14%	1,303	3,708
Dawson	69.54%	5,422	30.46%	2,375	7,797
Deuel	75.00%	762	25.00%	254	1,016
Dixon	60.22%	1,618	39.78%	1,069	2,687
Dodge	59.30%	8,823	40.70%	6,056	14,879
Douglas	48.25%	106,951	51.75%	114,700	221,651
Dundy	78.35%	767	21.65%	212	979
Fillmore	67.18%	1,918	32.82%	937	2,855
Franklin	72.59%	1,107	27.41%	418	1,525
Frontier	77.12%	1,008	22.88%	299	1,307
Furnas	77.43%	1,729	22.57%	504	2,233
Gage	53.74%	5,172	46.26%	4,452	9,624
Garden	75.76%	819	24.24%	262	1,081
Garfield	81.99%	774	18.01%	170	944
Gosper	75.31%	738	24.69%	242	980
Grant	83.52%	299	16.48%	59	358
Greeley	69.61%	827	30.39%	361	1,188
Hall	61.32%	12,350	38.68%	7,790	20,140
Hamilton	72.27%	3,498	27.73%	1,342	4,840
Harlan	75.64%	1329	24.36%	428	1,757
Hayes	83.49%	445	16.51%	88	533
Hitchcock	74.98%	1,112	25.02%	371	1,483
Holt	79.17%	3,896	20.83%	1,025	4,921
Hooker	82.84%	333	17.16%	69	402
Howard	67.69%	1,940	32.31%	926	2,866
Jefferson	60.04%	2,052	39.96%	1,366	3,418
Johnson	55.76%	1,147	44.24%	910	2,057
Kearney	74.08%	2,343	25.92%	820	3,163
Keith	73.76%	2,988	26.24%	1,063	4,051
Keya Paha	84.62%	407	15.38%	74	481
Kimball	73.39%	1,233	26.61%	447	1,680
Knox	71.52%	2,880	28.48%	1,147	4,027
Lancaster	46.15%	58,306	53.85%	68,046	126,352
Lincoln	66.00%	10,285	34.00%	5,298	15,583
Logan	82.45%	357	17.55%	76	433
Loup	78.71%	281	21.29%	76	357
Madison	72.92%	10,089	27.08%	3,746	13,835
McPherson	86.35%	253	13.65%	40	293
Merrick	71.44%	2,491	28.56%	996	3,487
Morrill	76.24%	1,675	23.76%	522	2,197
Nance	66.42%	1,068	33.58%	540	1,608
Nemaha	59.09%	1,901	40.91%	1,316	3,217
Nuckolls	70.21%	1,532	29.79%	650	2,182
Otoe	58.58%	4,067	41.42%	2,876	6,943
Pawnee	64.11%	861	35.89%	482	1,343
Perkins	78.60%	1,091	21.40%	297	1,388
Phelps	77.00%	3,368	23.00%	1,006	4,374
Pierce	79.55%	2,716	20.45%	698	3,414
Platte	73.13%	9,801	26.87%	3,601	13,402
Polk	74.65%	1,820	25.35%	618	2,438
Red Willow	75.25%	3,692	24.75%	1,214	4,906
Richardson	62.08%	2,312	37.92%	1,412	3,724
Rock	86.90%	683	13.10%	103	786
Saline	48.30%	2,387	51.70%	2,555	4,942
Sarpy	57.56%	40,682	42.44%	29,996	70,678
Saunders	63.72%	6,547	36.28%	3,728	10,275
Scotts Bluff	64.96%	9,299	35.04%	5,017	14,316
Seward	63.18%	4,764	36.82%	2,776	7,540
Sheridan	80.24%	1,986	19.76%	489	2,475
Sherman	63.20%	960	36.80%	559	1,519
Sioux	82.76%	605	17.24%	126	731
Stanton	74.99%	1,979	25.01%	660	2,639
Thayer	65.79%	1,742	34.21%	906	2,648
Thomas	85.23%	352	14.77%	61	413
Thurston	40.38%	900	59.62%	1,329	2,229
Valley	72.91%	1,599	27.09%	594	2,193
Washington	65.52%	6,660	34.48%	3,505	10,165
Wayne	67.56%	2,484	32.44%	1,193	3,677
Webster	69.66%	1,203	30.34%	524	1,727
Wheeler	79.78%	359	20.22%	91	450
York	74.78%	4,726	25.22%	1,594	6,320

Counties that flipped from Democratic to Republican

- Burt (largest village: Tekamah)
- Adams (largest city: Hastings)
- Antelope (largest city: Neligh)
- Box Butte (largest city: Alliance)
- Boyd (largest city: Spencer)
- Brown (largest city: Ainsworth)
- Buffalo (largest city: Kearney)
- Butler (largest city: David City)
- Cass (largest city: Plattsmouth)
- Cherry (largest city: Valentine)
- Clay (largest city: Sutton)
- Colfax (largest city: Schuyler)
- Cuming (largest city: West Point)
- Cedar (largest city: Hartington)
- Custer (largest city: Broken Bow)
- Dixon (largest city: Wakefield)
- Dawes (largest city: Chadron)
- Dawson (largest city: Lexington)
- Dodge (largest city: Fremont)
- Dundy (largest city: Benkelman)
- Frontier (largest city: Curtis)
- Furnas (largest city: Cambridge)
- Garfield (largest city: Burwell)
- Gosper (largest city: Elwood)
- Grant (largest city: Hyannis)
- Hall (largest city: Grand Island)
- Hamilton (largest city: Aurora)
- Harlan (largest city: Alma)
- Hayes (largest city: Palisade)
- Hitchcock (largest city: Culbertson)
- Holt (largest city: O'Neill)
- Hooker (largest city: Mullen)
- Kearney (largest city: Minden)
- Keya Paha (largest city: Springview)
- Knox (largest city: Creighton)
- Lincoln (largest city: North Platte)
- Logan (largest city: Stapleton)
- Loup (largest city: Taylor)
- Madison (largest city: Norfolk)
- Merrick (largest city: Central City)
- Nemaha (largest city: Auburn)
- Otoe (largest city: Nebraska City)
- Nance (largest city: Fullerton)
- Boone (largest city: Albion)
- Greeley (largest city: Spalding)
- Howard (largest city: St. Paul)
- Sherman (largest city: Loup City)
- Fillmore (largest city: Geneva)
- Gage (largest city: Beatrice)
- Jefferson (largest city: Fairbury)
- Johnson (largest city: Tecumseh)
- Pawnee (largest city: Pawnee City)
- Perkins (largest city: Grant)
- Phelps (largest city: Holdrege)
- Pierce (largest city: Pierce)
- Platte (largest city: Columbus)
- Polk (largest city: Stromsburg)
- Red Willow (largest city: McCook)
- Richardson (largest city: Falls City)
- Rock (largest city: Bassett)
- Sarpy (largest city: Bellevue)
- Saunders (largest city: Wahoo)
- Scotts Bluff (largest city: Scottsbluff)
- Seward (largest city: Seward)
- Stanton (largest city: Stanton)
- Thayer (largest city: Hebron)
- Thomas (largest city: Thedford)
- Valley (largest city: Ord)
- Washington (largest city: Blair)
- Wayne (largest city: Wayne)
- Webster (largest city: Red Cloud)
- Nuckolls (largest city: Superior)
- Franklin (largest city: Franklin)
- Wheeler (largest city: Bartlett)
- York (largest city: York)

==== By congressional district ====
Fischer won all three congressional districts.

District	Fischer	Kerrey	Representative
1st	55.01%	44.99%	Jeff Fortenberry
2nd	50.06%	49.94%	Lee Terry
3rd	68.48%	31.52%	Adrian Smith

== See also ==
- 2012 United States Senate elections
- 2012 United States House of Representatives elections in Nebraska
