= 1982 United States Senate election in Nebraska =

- November 5, 1982
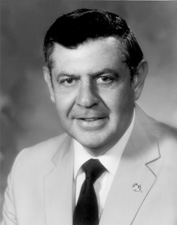

Nominee	Edward Zorinsky	Jim Keck
Party	Democratic	Republican
Popular vote	363,350	155,760
Percentage	66.59%	28.55%
- County results Zorinsky: 40–50% 50–60% 60–70% 70–80% Keck: 40–50% 50–60% Tie: 40–50%
U.S. senator before election
Edward Zorinsky
Democratic
Elected U.S. Senator
Edward Zorinsky
Democratic

The 1982 United States Senate election in Nebraska was held on Tuesday, November 2, 1982. Incumbent Democratic Senator Edward Zorinsky ran for re-election to a second term. Zorinsky was challenged by Republican nominee Jim Keck, a retired United States Air Force general. Zorinsky defeated Keck in a landslide, winning the highest percentage of the vote of any Democratic nominee for the U.S. Senate in state history.

== Democratic primary ==
=== Candidates ===
- Edward Zorinsky, incumbent Senator

=== Results ===
Democratic primary results
Party	Candidate	Votes	%
Democratic	Edward Zorinsky (inc.)	124,288	99.42%
Democratic	Write-ins	731	0.58%
Total votes		125,019	100.00%

== Republican primary ==
=== Candidates ===
- Jim Keck, retired United States Air Force general, advertising executive
- Ken Cameron, manufacturers' representative

=== Results ===
Republican primary results
Party	Candidate	Votes	%
Republican	Jim Keck	104,550	66.02%
Republican	Ken Cameron	53,453	33.76%
Republican	Write-ins	347	0.22%
Total votes		158,350	100.00%

== General election ==
1982 United States Senate election in Nebraska
Party	Candidate	Votes	%	±%
Democratic	Edward Zorinsky (inc.)	363,350	66.59%	+13.70%
Republican	Jim Keck	155,760	28.55%	−18.52%
Independent	Virginia Walsh	26,443	4.85%	—
Write-in		94	0.02%	—
Majority		207,590	38.04%	+32.22%
Total votes		545,647	100.00%	
Democratic hold				

== See also ==
- 1982 United States Senate elections
