= 1964 United States Senate election in Nebraska =

- November 3, 1964
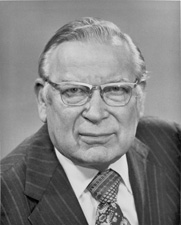

Nominee	Roman Hruska	Raymond W. Arndt
Party	Republican	Democratic
Popular vote	345,772	217,605
Percentage	61.37%	38.62%
- County results Hruska: 50–60% 60–70% 70–80% 80–90% Arndt: 50–60%
U.S. senator before election
Roman Hruska
Republican
Elected U.S. Senator
Roman Hruska
Republican

The 1964 United States Senate election in Nebraska took place on November 3, 1964. Incumbent Republican Senator Roman Hruska ran for re-election. He was challenged by the Democratic nominee, Raymond W. Arndt, the personnel director at the Nebraska Public Power District. Despite Democratic President Lyndon B. Johnson's narrow victory over Barry Goldwater in Nebraska, Hruska won re-election in a landslide, winning 61% of the vote and winning every county in the state except for Saline County. This was the only race in the 1964 United States Senate elections in which the Republicans won by double digits.

== Democratic primary ==
=== Candidates ===
- Raymond W. Arndt, personnel director at the Nebraska Public Power District

=== Results ===
Democratic primary results
Party	Candidate	Votes	%
Democratic	Raymond W. Arndt	65,988	99.28%
Democratic	Scattering	476	0.72%
Total votes		66,464	100.00%

== Republican primary ==
=== Candidates ===
- Roman Hruska, incumbent Senator

=== Results ===
Republican primary
Party	Candidate	Votes	%
Republican	Roman Hruska (inc.)	130,831	99.60%
Republican	Scattering	521	0.40%
Total votes		131,352	100.00%

== General election ==
1964 United States Senate election in Nebraska
Party	Candidate	Votes	%	±%
Republican	Roman Hruska (inc.)	345,772	61.37%	+5.73%
Democratic	Raymond W. Arndt	217,605	38.62%	−5.74%
Write-in		24	0.00%	—
Majority		128,167	22.75%	+11.57%
Total votes		563,401	100.00%	
Republican hold				
