= 1952 United States Senate special election in Nebraska =

- November 4, 1952
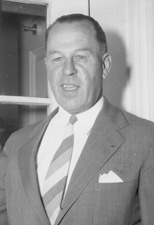

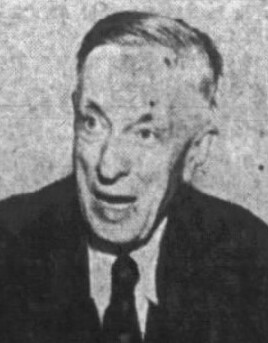
Nominee	Dwight Griswold	William Ritchie
Party	Republican	Democratic
Popular vote	369,841	211,898
Percentage	63.57%	36.42%
- County results Griswold: 50–60% 60–70% 70–80% 80–90%
U.S. senator before election
Fred A. Seaton
Republican
Elected U.S. Senator
Dwight Griswold
Republican

The 1952 United States Senate special election in Nebraska took place on November 2, 1952. Republican Senator Kenneth S. Wherry, who was elected to his second term in 1948, died on November 29, 1951. Governor Val Peterson appointed Seaton to fill the seat until the 1952 general election. Seaton did not run in the special election. Instead, former Governor Dwight Griswold won the primary and defeated Democratic nominee William Ritchie in a landslide in the general election. However, Griswold himself would die in office on April 12, 1954, triggering another special election in 1954.

== Democratic primary ==
=== Candidates ===
- William Ritchie, former Chairman of the Nebraska Democratic Party
- Henry L. Fillman, York insurance salesman, 1950 Democratic candidate for Governor

=== Results ===
Democratic primary results
Party	Candidate	Votes	%
Democratic	William Ritchie	76,446	78.85%
Democratic	Henry L. Fillman	20,414	21.05%
Democratic	Scattering	97	0.10%
Total votes		96,957	100.00%

== Republican primary ==
=== Candidates ===
- Dwight Griswold, former Governor of Nebraska, member of the University of Nebraska Board of Regents
- Walter A. Nielsen, Omaha attorney and businessman
- Al Misegadis, cement finisher

=== Results ===
Republican primary results
Party	Candidate	Votes	%
Republican	Dwight Griswold	162,952	81.31%
Republican	Walter A. Nielsen	31,873	15.91%
Republican	Al Misegadis	5,153	2.56%
Republican	Fred A. Seaton (inc.) (write-in)	68	0.03%
Republican	Scattering	350	0.17%
Total votes		200,396	100.00%

== Results ==
1952 United States Senate special election in Nebraska
Party	Candidate	Votes	%	±%
Republican	Dwight Griswold	369,841	63.57%	+6.87%
Democratic	William Ritchie	211,898	36.42%	−6.88%
Write-in		11	0.00%	—
Majority		157,943	27.15%	+13.75%
Total votes		581,750	100.00%	
Republican hold				
