= Edward R. Burke =

American politician

Edward Raymond Burke
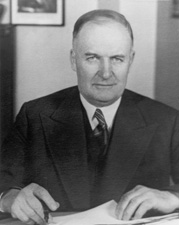

United States Senator from Nebraska
- In office January 3, 1935 – January 3, 1941
- Preceded by: Richard C. Hunter
- Succeeded by: Hugh A. Butler

Member of the U.S. House of Representatives from Nebraska's 2nd district
- In office March 4, 1933 – January 3, 1935
- Preceded by: H. Malcolm Baldrige
- Succeeded by: Charles F. McLaughlin

Personal details
- Born: November 28, 1880 Bon Homme County, South Dakota, U.S.
- Died: November 4, 1968 (aged 87) Kensington, Maryland, U.S.
- Party: Democratic
- Spouse: Henrietta Matilda Flinn (m. 1911)

Edward Raymond Burke (November 28, 1880 – November 4, 1968) was an American Democratic Party politician. Burke moved to Sparta, Wisconsin with his parents and then Beloit, Wisconsin, where he went to Beloit College. Burke graduated in 1906, moved to Chadron, Nebraska, where he taught school until 1908. He graduated from Harvard Law School and was admitted to the bar in 1911. Afterwards, he set up shop in Omaha, Nebraska.

During World War I he enlisted and served as a second lieutenant in the Air Service from 1917 to 1919. He served as the president of the Omaha Board of Education from 1927 to 1930. He was elected to the Seventy-third Congress from Nebraska in 1933 and then ran successfully for U.S. senator in 1934. Serving from January 3, 1935, to January 3, 1941, he chaired the U.S. Senate Committee on Claims.

In the Senate, he supported President Roosevelt's First New Deal, but opposed the Second New Deal and broke with the President on adding new justices to the U.S. Supreme Court and some of his foreign policy. He also believed that no president should serve more than two terms. As a result, he failed to be renominated for the seat in 1940, losing the Democratic primary to Governor Roy Cochran. In the general election, he endorsed Republican presidential nominee Wendell Willkie, and also endorsed Hugh A. Butler, the Republican nominee for the U.S. Senate, who defeated Cochran in the general election.

He resumed his law practice in Omaha in 1941 and moved to Washington, D.C., in 1942 to serve as president of the Southern Coal Producers Association until 1947. He was a Washington representative and general counsel for Hawaiian Statehood Commission until 1950, when he retired to Kensington, Maryland. He died in 1968, and was interred in Fort Lincoln Mausoleum.

== See also ==
- List of Harvard University politicians

Party political offices
| Preceded by Richard C. Hunter | Democratic nominee for U.S. Senator from Nebraska (Class 1); 1934 | Succeeded by Roy Cochran |
U.S. House of Representatives
| Preceded by H. Malcolm Baldrige | Member of the U.S. House of Representatives from Nebraska's 2nd congressional district March 4, 1933 – January 3, 1935 | Succeeded by Charles F. McLaughlin |
U.S. Senate
| Preceded by Richard C. Hunter | U.S. senator (Class 1) from Nebraska; January 3, 1935 – January 3, 1941; Served alongside: George W. Norris | Succeeded by Hugh A. Butler |
