= John Y. McCollister =

American politician (1921–2013)

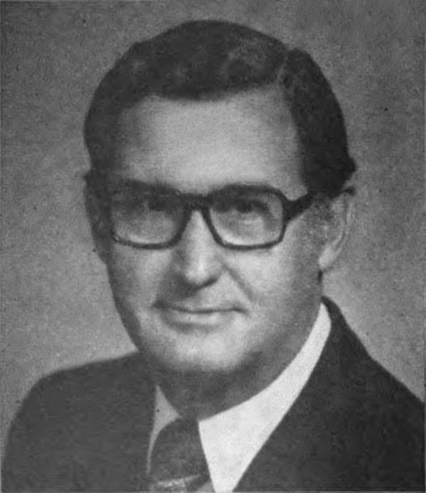

Member of the U.S. House of Representatives from Nebraska's 2nd district
- In office January 3, 1971 – January 3, 1977
- Preceded by: Glenn Cunningham
- Succeeded by: John Joseph Cavanaugh III

Personal details
- Born: John Yetter McCollister; June 10, 1921 Iowa City, Iowa, U.S.
- Died: November 1, 2013 (aged 92) Omaha, Nebraska, U.S.
- Party: Republican
- Children: John S. McCollister
- Education: University of Iowa

John Yetter McCollister (June 10, 1921 – November 1, 2013) was an American Republican politician.

He was born to John M. McCollister and Ruth Yetter McCollister in Iowa City, Iowa. In 1939 he graduated from Washington High School in Sioux Falls, South Dakota and in 1943 he graduated from the University of Iowa in Iowa City. He married Nanette Stokes on August 22, 1943.

== Career ==
McCollister was a lieutenant in United States Naval Reserve from 1943 to 1946. From 1960 to 1971 and again from 1979 to 1986 he was president of McCollister & Co.

For two terms from 1965 to 1970, he was the Douglas County Commissioner. He was a delegate to the Nebraska State Republican conventions from 1960 to 1970, and delegate to the 1968 Republican National Convention. He was elected as a Republican to the Ninety-second United States Congress, defeating incumbent Glenn Cunningham in the Republican primary. He was reelected to the Ninety-third United States Congress and Ninety-fourth United States Congress serving from January 3, 1971, to January 3, 1977. In 1976, he decided to run instead for the U.S. Senate but was unsuccessful, losing to Omaha Mayor Edward Zorinsky by a 53% to 47% margin. He was a presidential elector for Nebraska in 2000.

== Personal life ==
McCollister was a resident of Omaha, Nebraska.

McCollister died of cancer in November 2013.

McCollister has three sons: Stephen McCollister, Bruce McCollister, and John S. McCollister — former state senator from district 20 in Omaha.

== Sources ==
1. "McCollister, John Yetter". The Political Graveyard.
2. "McCollister, John Yetter". Biographical Directory of the United States Congress.

Party political offices
Preceded by Roman Hruska	Republican nominee for U.S. Senator from Nebraska (Class 1); 1976	Succeeded by Jim Keck
U.S. House of Representatives
Preceded by Glenn Cunningham	Member of the U.S. House of Representatives from Nebraska's 2nd congressional district 1971–1977	Succeeded by John Joseph Cavanaugh III
