= 1958 United States Senate election in Nebraska =

- November 4, 1958
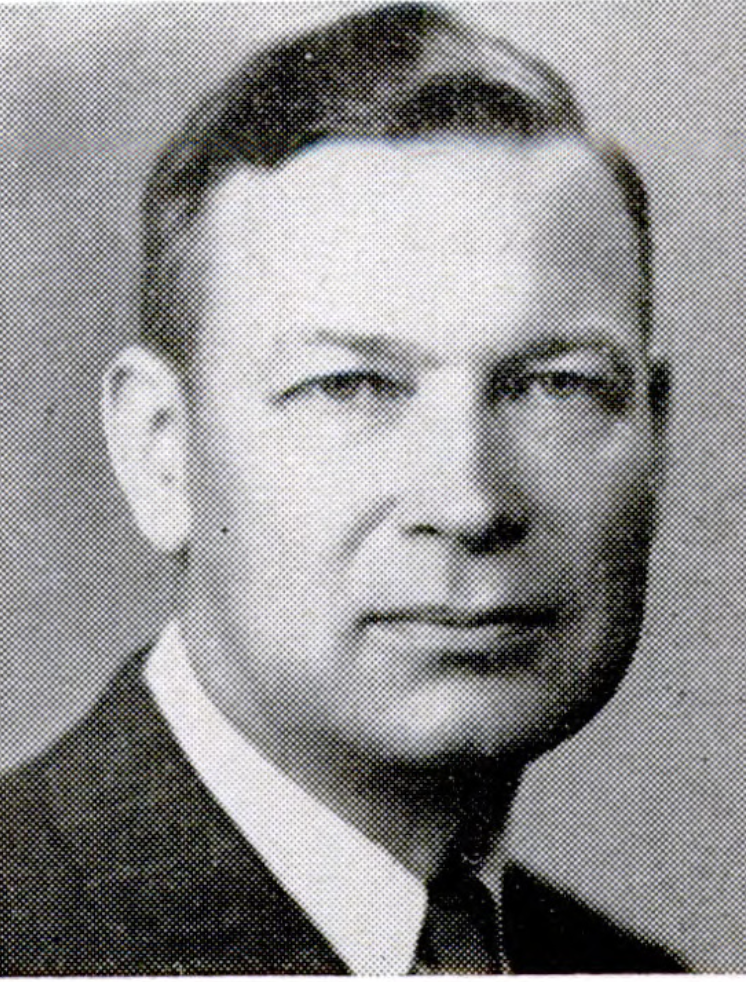

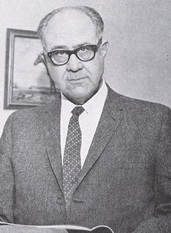
| Nominee | Roman Hruska | Frank B. Morrison |
| Party | Republican | Democratic |
| Popular vote | 232,227 | 185,152 |
| Percentage | 55.64% | 44.36% |
- County results Hruska: 50–60% 60–70% 70–80% Morrison: 50–60%
U.S. senator before election
Roman Hruska
Republican
Elected U.S. Senator
Roman Hruska
Republican

The 1958 United States Senate election in Nebraska took place on November 4, 1958. Incumbent Republican Senator Roman Hruska, who was first elected in a 1954 special election, ran for re-election to a full term. He was challenged in the general election by attorney Frank B. Morrison, the Democratic nominee. Despite nationwide Democratic gains, Hruska comfortably won re-election, receiving 56% of the vote to Morrison's 44%.

== Democratic primary ==
=== Candidates ===
- Frank B. Morrison, former Frontier County Attorney, 1956 Democratic nominee for Lieutenant Governor
- Eugene D. O'Sullivan, former U.S. Representative from Nebraska's 2nd congressional district
- Mike F. Kracher, Omaha businessman

=== Results ===
Democratic primary results
| Party | Candidate | Votes | % |
|---|---|---|---|
| Democratic | Frank B. Morrison | 35,482 | 51.85% |
| Democratic | Eugene D. O'Sullivan | 26,436 | 38.63% |
| Democratic | Mike F. Kracher | 6,500 | 9.50% |
| Democratic | Scattering | 13 | 0.02% |
| Total votes | | 68,431 | 100.00% |

== Republican primary ==
=== Candidates ===
- Roman Hruska, incumbent Senator

=== Results ===
Republican primary
| Party | Candidate | Votes | % |
|---|---|---|---|
| Republican | Roman Hruska (inc.) | 103,348 | 99.95% |
| Republican | Scattering | 51 | 0.05% |
| Total votes | | 103,399 | 100.00% |

== General election ==
1958 United States Senate election in Nebraska
| Party | Candidate | Votes | % | ±% |
|---|---|---|---|---|
| Republican | Roman Hruska (inc.) | 232,227 | 55.64% | −5.24% |
| Democratic | Frank B. Morrison | 185,152 | 44.36% | +5.24% |
| Write-in | | 6 | 0.00% | — |
| Majority | | 47,075 | 11.18% | −10.58% |
| Total votes | | 417,385 | 100.00% | |
| Republican hold | | | | |
