= Eugene A. Leahy =

American politician

Mayor of Omaha
- In office 1969–1973
- Preceded by: Alexander V. Sorensen
- Succeeded by: Edward Zorinsky

Personal details
- Born: Eugene Anthony Leahy; May 8, 1929
- Died: January 18, 2000 (aged 70)

Eugene A. "Gene" Leahy (May 8, 1929 – January 18, 2000) was Mayor of Omaha, Nebraska from 1969 to 1973. Gene Leahy Mall in Downtown Omaha is named after him. His unorthodox style endeared him to many Omahans. He would often wear a clown suit for poor children's celebrations and he championed the retention of football at the University of Nebraska at Omaha when the Nebraska University System wanted to cut it. Mayor Leahy was also well known for reading the Sunday comics on a local television station. His long range planning for the city was done in a fashion which did not draw attention to his own guidance and vision yet has been one of the enduring backbones which the subsequent city leaders have built upon.

Preceded by Alexander V. Sorensen	Mayor of Omaha; 1969–1973	Succeeded by Edward Zorinsky
