= List of United States senators from Nebraska =

Current delegation

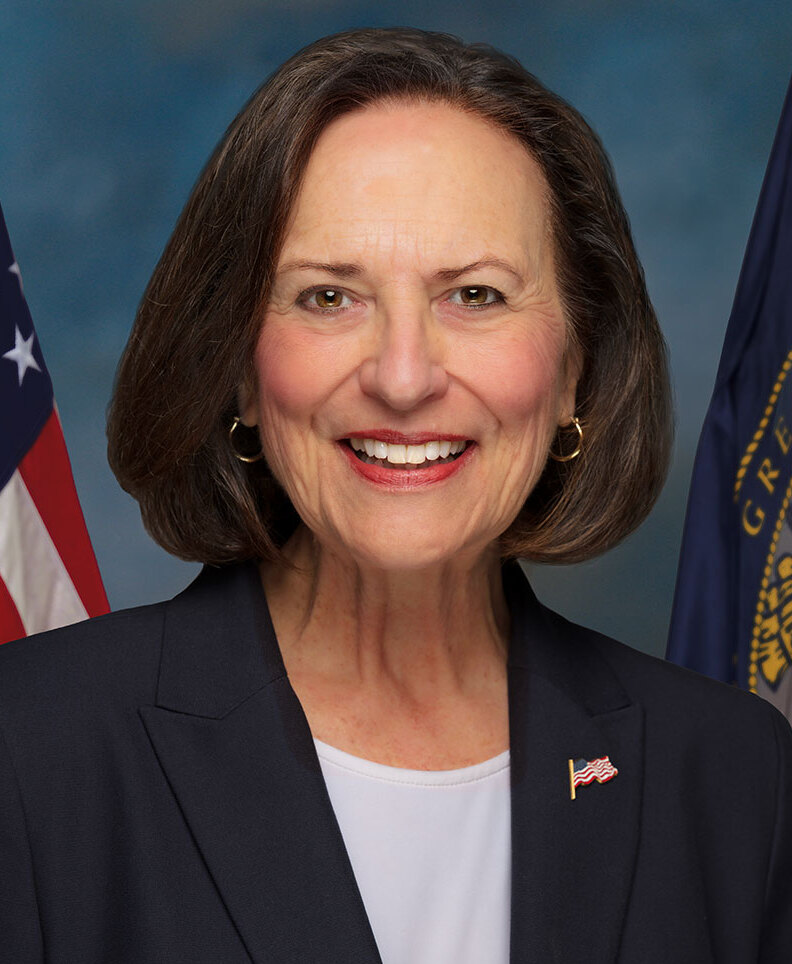
Deb Fischer (R)

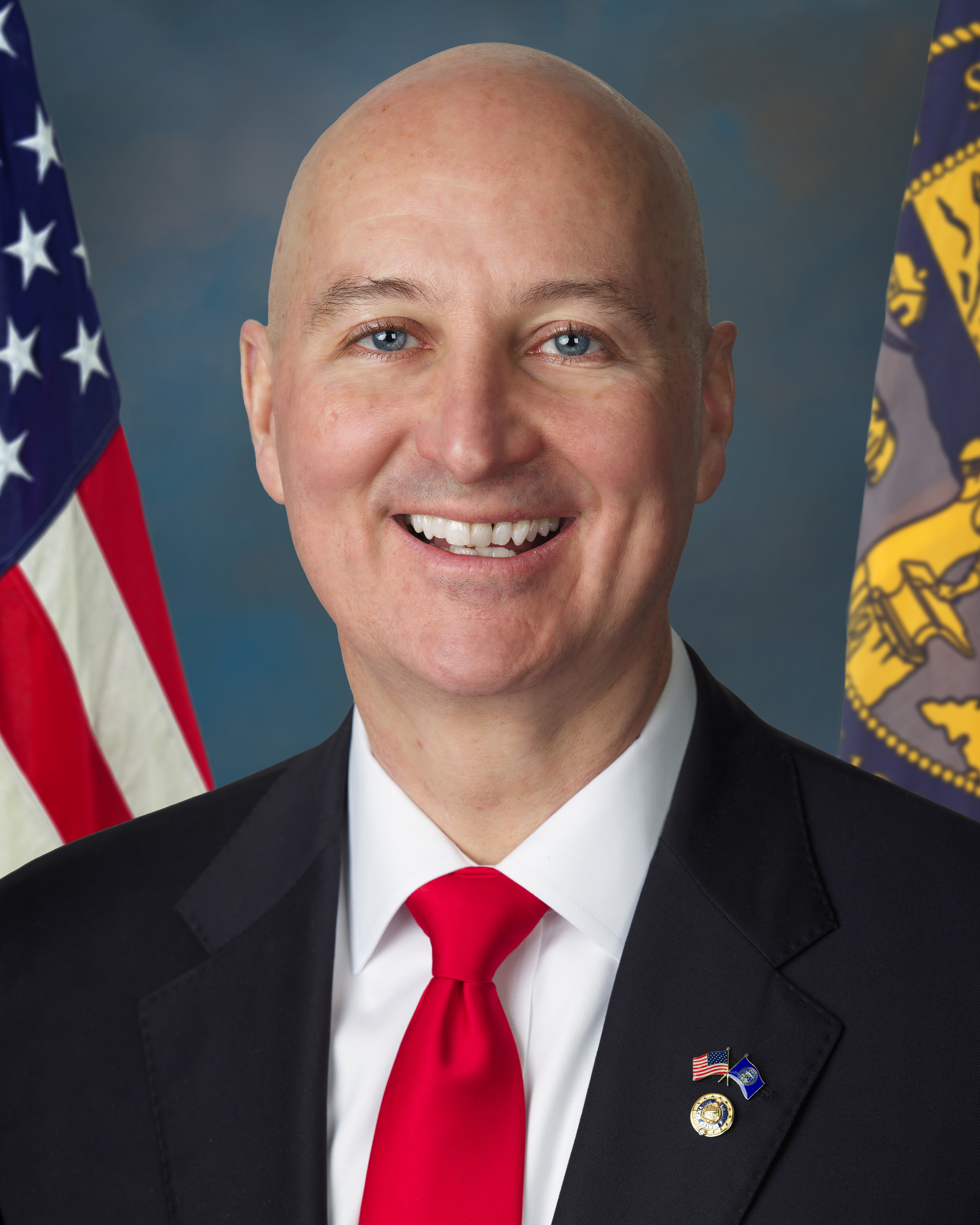
Pete Ricketts (R)

(ordered by seniority)

Nebraska was admitted to the Union on March 1, 1867, and elects its United States senators to class 1 and class 2. George W. Norris was the state’s longest serving senator (served 1913–1943). Nebraska's current senators are Republicans Deb Fischer (since 2013) and Pete Ricketts (since 2023).

== List of senators ==
Class 1 Class 1 senators belong to the electoral cycle that most recently had regular elections in 2006, 2012, 2018, and 2024. The next election will be in 2030.						C	Class 2 Class 2 senators belong to the electoral cycle that most recently had regular elections in 2008, 2014, 2020, and 2026. The next election will be in 2032.					
#	Senator	Party	Dates in office	Electoral history	T	C	T	Electoral history	Dates in office	Party	Senator	#
1	Thomas Tipton (Brownville)	Republican	Mar 1, 1867 – Mar 3, 1875	Elected in 1867.	1	39th	1	Elected in 1867. Lost re-election.	Mar 1, 1867 – Mar 3, 1871	Republican	John Thayer (Omaha)	1
1	Thomas Tipton (Brownville)	Republican	Mar 1, 1867 – Mar 3, 1875	Elected in 1867.	1	40th	1	Elected in 1867. Lost re-election.	Mar 1, 1867 – Mar 3, 1871	Republican	John Thayer (Omaha)	1
1	Thomas Tipton (Brownville)	Republican	Mar 1, 1867 – Mar 3, 1875	Re-elected in 1869. [data missing]	2	41st	1	Elected in 1867. Lost re-election.	Mar 1, 1867 – Mar 3, 1871	Republican	John Thayer (Omaha)	1
1	Thomas Tipton (Brownville)	Republican	Mar 1, 1867 – Mar 3, 1875	Re-elected in 1869. [data missing]	2	42nd	2	Elected in 1870. Lost re-election.	Mar 4, 1871 – Mar 3, 1877	Republican	Phineas Hitchcock (Omaha)	2
1	Thomas Tipton (Brownville)	Republican	Mar 1, 1867 – Mar 3, 1875	Re-elected in 1869. [data missing]	2	43rd	2	Elected in 1870. Lost re-election.	Mar 4, 1871 – Mar 3, 1877	Republican	Phineas Hitchcock (Omaha)	2
2	Algernon Paddock (Beatrice)	Republican	Mar 4, 1875 – Mar 3, 1881	Elected in 1875. Lost re-election.	3	44th	2	Elected in 1870. Lost re-election.	Mar 4, 1871 – Mar 3, 1877	Republican	Phineas Hitchcock (Omaha)	2
2	Algernon Paddock (Beatrice)	Republican	Mar 4, 1875 – Mar 3, 1881	Elected in 1875. Lost re-election.	3	45th	3	Elected in 1877. [data missing]	Mar 4, 1877 – Mar 3, 1883	Republican	Alvin Saunders (Omaha)	3
2	Algernon Paddock (Beatrice)	Republican	Mar 4, 1875 – Mar 3, 1881	Elected in 1875. Lost re-election.	3	46th	3	Elected in 1877. [data missing]	Mar 4, 1877 – Mar 3, 1883	Republican	Alvin Saunders (Omaha)	3
3	Charles Van Wyck (Nebraska City)	Republican	Mar 4, 1881 – Mar 3, 1887	Elected in 1880. Lost re-election.	4	47th	3	Elected in 1877. [data missing]	Mar 4, 1877 – Mar 3, 1883	Republican	Alvin Saunders (Omaha)	3
3	Charles Van Wyck (Nebraska City)	Republican	Mar 4, 1881 – Mar 3, 1887	Elected in 1880. Lost re-election.	4	48th	4	Elected in 1883.	Mar 4, 1883 – Mar 3, 1895	Republican	Charles F. Manderson (Omaha)	4
3	Charles Van Wyck (Nebraska City)	Republican	Mar 4, 1881 – Mar 3, 1887	Elected in 1880. Lost re-election.	4	49th	4	Elected in 1883.	Mar 4, 1883 – Mar 3, 1895	Republican	Charles F. Manderson (Omaha)	4
4	Algernon Paddock (Beatrice)	Republican	Mar 4, 1887 – Mar 3, 1893	Elected in 1886. Retired.	5	50th	4	Elected in 1883.	Mar 4, 1883 – Mar 3, 1895	Republican	Charles F. Manderson (Omaha)	4
4	Algernon Paddock (Beatrice)	Republican	Mar 4, 1887 – Mar 3, 1893	Elected in 1886. Retired.	5	51st	5	Re-elected in 1888. [data missing]	Mar 4, 1883 – Mar 3, 1895	Republican	Charles F. Manderson (Omaha)	4
4	Algernon Paddock (Beatrice)	Republican	Mar 4, 1887 – Mar 3, 1893	Elected in 1886. Retired.	5	52nd	5	Re-elected in 1888. [data missing]	Mar 4, 1883 – Mar 3, 1895	Republican	Charles F. Manderson (Omaha)	4
5	William V. Allen (Madison)	Populist	Mar 4, 1893 – Mar 3, 1899	Elected in 1893. Lost re-election.	6	53rd	5	Re-elected in 1888. [data missing]	Mar 4, 1883 – Mar 3, 1895	Republican	Charles F. Manderson (Omaha)	4
5	William V. Allen (Madison)	Populist	Mar 4, 1893 – Mar 3, 1899	Elected in 1893. Lost re-election.	6	54th	6	Elected in 1895. Retired.	Mar 4, 1895 – Mar 3, 1901	Republican	John M. Thurston (Omaha)	5
5	William V. Allen (Madison)	Populist	Mar 4, 1893 – Mar 3, 1899	Elected in 1893. Lost re-election.	6	55th	6	Elected in 1895. Retired.	Mar 4, 1895 – Mar 3, 1901	Republican	John M. Thurston (Omaha)	5
Vacant			Mar 4, 1899 – Mar 8, 1899	Legislature failed to elect.	7	56th	6	Elected in 1895. Retired.	Mar 4, 1895 – Mar 3, 1901	Republican	John M. Thurston (Omaha)	5
6	Monroe Hayward (Nebraska City)	Republican	Mar 8, 1899 – Dec 5, 1899	Elected late. Died before qualifying.	7	56th	6	Elected in 1895. Retired.	Mar 4, 1895 – Mar 3, 1901	Republican	John M. Thurston (Omaha)	5
Vacant			Dec 5, 1899 – Dec 13, 1899		7	56th	6	Elected in 1895. Retired.	Mar 4, 1895 – Mar 3, 1901	Republican	John M. Thurston (Omaha)	5
7	William V. Allen (Madison)	Populist	Dec 13, 1899 – Mar 28, 1901	Appointed to continue Hayward's term. Lost election to finish Hayward's term.	7	56th	6	Elected in 1895. Retired.	Mar 4, 1895 – Mar 3, 1901	Republican	John M. Thurston (Omaha)	5
7	William V. Allen (Madison)	Populist	Dec 13, 1899 – Mar 28, 1901	Appointed to continue Hayward's term. Lost election to finish Hayward's term.	7	57th	7	Legislature failed to elect	Mar 4, 1901 – Mar 28, 1901	Vacant		
8	Charles H. Dietrich (Hastings)	Republican	Mar 28, 1901 – Mar 3, 1905	Elected in 1901 to finish Hayward's term. Retired.	7	57th	7	Elected in 1901 to finish vacant term. Retired.	Mar 28, 1901 – Mar 3, 1907	Republican	Joseph Millard (Omaha)	6
8	Charles H. Dietrich (Hastings)	Republican	Mar 28, 1901 – Mar 3, 1905	Elected in 1901 to finish Hayward's term. Retired.	7	58th	7	Elected in 1901 to finish vacant term. Retired.	Mar 28, 1901 – Mar 3, 1907	Republican	Joseph Millard (Omaha)	6
9	Elmer Burkett (Lincoln)	Republican	Mar 4, 1905 – Mar 3, 1911	Elected in 1905. Lost renomination.	8	59th	7	Elected in 1901 to finish vacant term. Retired.	Mar 28, 1901 – Mar 3, 1907	Republican	Joseph Millard (Omaha)	6
9	Elmer Burkett (Lincoln)	Republican	Mar 4, 1905 – Mar 3, 1911	Elected in 1905. Lost renomination.	8	60th	8	Elected in 1907. Lost renomination.	Mar 4, 1907 – Mar 3, 1913	Republican	Norris Brown (Kearney)	7
9	Elmer Burkett (Lincoln)	Republican	Mar 4, 1905 – Mar 3, 1911	Elected in 1905. Lost renomination.	8	61st	8	Elected in 1907. Lost renomination.	Mar 4, 1907 – Mar 3, 1913	Republican	Norris Brown (Kearney)	7
10	Gilbert Hitchcock (Omaha)	Democratic	Mar 4, 1911 – Mar 3, 1923	Elected in 1911.	9	62nd	8	Elected in 1907. Lost renomination.	Mar 4, 1907 – Mar 3, 1913	Republican	Norris Brown (Kearney)	7
10	Gilbert Hitchcock (Omaha)	Democratic	Mar 4, 1911 – Mar 3, 1923	Elected in 1911.	9	63rd	9	Elected in 1913.	Mar 4, 1913 – Jan 3, 1937	Republican	George W. Norris (McCook)	8
10	Gilbert Hitchcock (Omaha)	Democratic	Mar 4, 1911 – Mar 3, 1923	Elected in 1911.	9	64th	9	Elected in 1913.	Mar 4, 1913 – Jan 3, 1937	Republican	George W. Norris (McCook)	8
10	Gilbert Hitchcock (Omaha)	Democratic	Mar 4, 1911 – Mar 3, 1923	Re-elected in 1916. Lost re-election.	10	65th	9	Elected in 1913.	Mar 4, 1913 – Jan 3, 1937	Republican	George W. Norris (McCook)	8
10	Gilbert Hitchcock (Omaha)	Democratic	Mar 4, 1911 – Mar 3, 1923	Re-elected in 1916. Lost re-election.	10	66th	10	Re-elected in 1918.	Mar 4, 1913 – Jan 3, 1937	Republican	George W. Norris (McCook)	8
10	Gilbert Hitchcock (Omaha)	Democratic	Mar 4, 1911 – Mar 3, 1923	Re-elected in 1916. Lost re-election.	10	67th	10	Re-elected in 1918.	Mar 4, 1913 – Jan 3, 1937	Republican	George W. Norris (McCook)	8
11	Robert B. Howell (Omaha)	Republican	Mar 4, 1923 – Mar 11, 1933	Elected in 1922.	11	68th	10	Re-elected in 1918.	Mar 4, 1913 – Jan 3, 1937	Republican	George W. Norris (McCook)	8
11	Robert B. Howell (Omaha)	Republican	Mar 4, 1923 – Mar 11, 1933	Elected in 1922.	11	69th	11	Re-elected in 1924.	Mar 4, 1913 – Jan 3, 1937	Republican	George W. Norris (McCook)	8
11	Robert B. Howell (Omaha)	Republican	Mar 4, 1923 – Mar 11, 1933	Elected in 1922.	11	70th	11	Re-elected in 1924.	Mar 4, 1913 – Jan 3, 1937	Republican	George W. Norris (McCook)	8
11	Robert B. Howell (Omaha)	Republican	Mar 4, 1923 – Mar 11, 1933	Re-elected in 1928. Died.	12	71st	11	Re-elected in 1924.	Mar 4, 1913 – Jan 3, 1937	Republican	George W. Norris (McCook)	8
11	Robert B. Howell (Omaha)	Republican	Mar 4, 1923 – Mar 11, 1933	Re-elected in 1928. Died.	12	72nd	12	Re-elected in 1930.	Mar 4, 1913 – Jan 3, 1937	Republican	George W. Norris (McCook)	8
11	Robert B. Howell (Omaha)	Republican	Mar 4, 1923 – Mar 11, 1933	Re-elected in 1928. Died.	12	73rd	12	Re-elected in 1930.	Mar 4, 1913 – Jan 3, 1937	Republican	George W. Norris (McCook)	8
Vacant			Mar 11, 1933 – May 24, 1933		12	73rd	12	Re-elected in 1930.	Mar 4, 1913 – Jan 3, 1937	Republican	George W. Norris (McCook)	8
12	William H. Thompson (Grand Island)	Democratic	May 24, 1933 – Nov 6, 1934	Appointed to continue Howell's term. Retired when successor qualified.	12	73rd	12	Re-elected in 1930.	Mar 4, 1913 – Jan 3, 1937	Republican	George W. Norris (McCook)	8
13	Richard C. Hunter (Omaha)	Democratic	Nov 7, 1934 – Jan 3, 1935	Elected to finish Howell's term. Retired.	12	73rd	12	Re-elected in 1930.	Mar 4, 1913 – Jan 3, 1937	Republican	George W. Norris (McCook)	8
14	Edward R. Burke (Omaha)	Democratic	Jan 3, 1935 – Jan 3, 1941	Elected in 1934. Lost renomination.	13	74th	12	Re-elected in 1930.	Mar 4, 1913 – Jan 3, 1937	Republican	George W. Norris (McCook)	8
14	Edward R. Burke (Omaha)	Democratic	Jan 3, 1935 – Jan 3, 1941	Elected in 1934. Lost renomination.	13	75th	13	Re-elected in 1936. Lost re-election.	Jan 3, 1937 – Jan 3, 1943	Independent	George W. Norris (McCook)	8
14	Edward R. Burke (Omaha)	Democratic	Jan 3, 1935 – Jan 3, 1941	Elected in 1934. Lost renomination.	13	76th	13	Re-elected in 1936. Lost re-election.	Jan 3, 1937 – Jan 3, 1943	Independent	George W. Norris (McCook)	8
15	Hugh A. Butler (Omaha)	Republican	Jan 3, 1941 – Jul 1, 1954	Elected in 1940.	14	77th	13	Re-elected in 1936. Lost re-election.	Jan 3, 1937 – Jan 3, 1943	Independent	George W. Norris (McCook)	8
15	Hugh A. Butler (Omaha)	Republican	Jan 3, 1941 – Jul 1, 1954	Elected in 1940.	14	78th	14	Elected in 1942.	Jan 3, 1943 – Nov 29, 1951	Republican	Kenneth S. Wherry (Pawnee City)	9
15	Hugh A. Butler (Omaha)	Republican	Jan 3, 1941 – Jul 1, 1954	Elected in 1940.	14	79th	14	Elected in 1942.	Jan 3, 1943 – Nov 29, 1951	Republican	Kenneth S. Wherry (Pawnee City)	9
15	Hugh A. Butler (Omaha)	Republican	Jan 3, 1941 – Jul 1, 1954	Re-elected in 1946.	15	80th	14	Elected in 1942.	Jan 3, 1943 – Nov 29, 1951	Republican	Kenneth S. Wherry (Pawnee City)	9
15	Hugh A. Butler (Omaha)	Republican	Jan 3, 1941 – Jul 1, 1954	Re-elected in 1946.	15	81st	15	Re-elected in 1948. Died.	Jan 3, 1943 – Nov 29, 1951	Republican	Kenneth S. Wherry (Pawnee City)	9
15	Hugh A. Butler (Omaha)	Republican	Jan 3, 1941 – Jul 1, 1954	Re-elected in 1946.	15	82nd	15	Re-elected in 1948. Died.	Jan 3, 1943 – Nov 29, 1951	Republican	Kenneth S. Wherry (Pawnee City)	9
15	Hugh A. Butler (Omaha)	Republican	Jan 3, 1941 – Jul 1, 1954	Re-elected in 1946.	15	82nd	15		Nov 29, 1951 – Dec 10, 1951	Vacant		
15	Hugh A. Butler (Omaha)	Republican	Jan 3, 1941 – Jul 1, 1954	Re-elected in 1946.	15	82nd	15	Appointed to continue Wherry's term. Retired when successor elected.	Dec 10, 1951 – Nov 4, 1952	Republican	Fred A. Seaton (Hastings)	10
15	Hugh A. Butler (Omaha)	Republican	Jan 3, 1941 – Jul 1, 1954	Re-elected in 1946.	15	82nd	15	Elected in 1952 to finish Wherry's term. Died.	Nov 5, 1952 – Apr 12, 1954	Republican	Dwight Griswold (Scottsbluff)	11
15	Hugh A. Butler (Omaha)	Republican	Jan 3, 1941 – Jul 1, 1954	Re-elected in 1952. Died.	16	83rd	15	Elected in 1952 to finish Wherry's term. Died.	Nov 5, 1952 – Apr 12, 1954	Republican	Dwight Griswold (Scottsbluff)	11
15	Hugh A. Butler (Omaha)	Republican	Jan 3, 1941 – Jul 1, 1954	Re-elected in 1952. Died.	16	83rd	15		Apr 12, 1954 – Apr 16, 1954	Vacant		
15	Hugh A. Butler (Omaha)	Republican	Jan 3, 1941 – Jul 1, 1954	Re-elected in 1952. Died.	16	83rd	15	Appointed to continue Wherry's term. Retired when successor elected.	Apr 16, 1954 – Nov 7, 1954	Republican	Eva Bowring (Merriman)	12
Vacant			Jul 1, 1954 – Jul 3, 1954		16	83rd	15	Appointed to continue Wherry's term. Retired when successor elected.	Apr 16, 1954 – Nov 7, 1954	Republican	Eva Bowring (Merriman)	12
Vacant			Jul 1, 1954 – Jul 3, 1954		16	83rd	15	Elected in 1954 to finish Wherry's term. Resigned.	Nov 8, 1954 – Dec 31, 1954	Republican	Hazel Abel (Lincoln)	13
16	Samuel W. Reynolds (Omaha)	Republican	Jul 3, 1954 – Nov 7, 1954	Appointed to continue Butler's term. Retired when successor qualified.	16	83rd	15	Elected in 1954 to finish Wherry's term. Resigned.	Nov 8, 1954 – Dec 31, 1954	Republican	Hazel Abel (Lincoln)	13
17	Roman Hruska (Omaha)	Republican	Nov 8, 1954 – Dec 27, 1976	Elected in 1954 to finish Butler's term.	16	83rd	15	Elected in 1954 to finish Wherry's term. Resigned.	Nov 8, 1954 – Dec 31, 1954	Republican	Hazel Abel (Lincoln)	13
17	Roman Hruska (Omaha)	Republican	Nov 8, 1954 – Dec 27, 1976	Elected in 1954 to finish Butler's term.	16	83rd	15	Appointed to finish Wherry's term, having already been elected to the next term.	Jan 1, 1955 – Jan 3, 1979	Republican	Carl Curtis (Minden)	14
17	Roman Hruska (Omaha)	Republican	Nov 8, 1954 – Dec 27, 1976	Elected in 1954 to finish Butler's term.	16	84th	16	Elected in 1954.	Jan 1, 1955 – Jan 3, 1979	Republican	Carl Curtis (Minden)	14
17	Roman Hruska (Omaha)	Republican	Nov 8, 1954 – Dec 27, 1976	Elected in 1954 to finish Butler's term.	16	85th	16	Elected in 1954.	Jan 1, 1955 – Jan 3, 1979	Republican	Carl Curtis (Minden)	14
17	Roman Hruska (Omaha)	Republican	Nov 8, 1954 – Dec 27, 1976	Re-elected in 1958.	17	86th	16	Elected in 1954.	Jan 1, 1955 – Jan 3, 1979	Republican	Carl Curtis (Minden)	14
17	Roman Hruska (Omaha)	Republican	Nov 8, 1954 – Dec 27, 1976	Re-elected in 1958.	17	87th	17	Re-elected in 1960.	Jan 1, 1955 – Jan 3, 1979	Republican	Carl Curtis (Minden)	14
17	Roman Hruska (Omaha)	Republican	Nov 8, 1954 – Dec 27, 1976	Re-elected in 1958.	17	88th	17	Re-elected in 1960.	Jan 1, 1955 – Jan 3, 1979	Republican	Carl Curtis (Minden)	14
17	Roman Hruska (Omaha)	Republican	Nov 8, 1954 – Dec 27, 1976	Re-elected in 1964.	18	89th	17	Re-elected in 1960.	Jan 1, 1955 – Jan 3, 1979	Republican	Carl Curtis (Minden)	14
17	Roman Hruska (Omaha)	Republican	Nov 8, 1954 – Dec 27, 1976	Re-elected in 1964.	18	90th	18	Re-elected in 1966.	Jan 1, 1955 – Jan 3, 1979	Republican	Carl Curtis (Minden)	14
17	Roman Hruska (Omaha)	Republican	Nov 8, 1954 – Dec 27, 1976	Re-elected in 1964.	18	91st	18	Re-elected in 1966.	Jan 1, 1955 – Jan 3, 1979	Republican	Carl Curtis (Minden)	14
17	Roman Hruska (Omaha)	Republican	Nov 8, 1954 – Dec 27, 1976	Re-elected in 1970. Retired and resigned early.	18	92nd	18	Re-elected in 1966.	Jan 1, 1955 – Jan 3, 1979	Republican	Carl Curtis (Minden)	14
17	Roman Hruska (Omaha)	Republican	Nov 8, 1954 – Dec 27, 1976	Re-elected in 1970. Retired and resigned early.	18	93rd	19	Re-elected in 1972. Retired.	Jan 1, 1955 – Jan 3, 1979	Republican	Carl Curtis (Minden)	14
17	Roman Hruska (Omaha)	Republican	Nov 8, 1954 – Dec 27, 1976	Re-elected in 1970. Retired and resigned early.	18	94th	19	Re-elected in 1972. Retired.	Jan 1, 1955 – Jan 3, 1979	Republican	Carl Curtis (Minden)	14
18	Edward Zorinsky (Omaha)	Democratic	Dec 28, 1976 – Mar 6, 1987	Appointed to finish Hruska's term, having been elected to the next term.	18	94th	19	Re-elected in 1972. Retired.	Jan 1, 1955 – Jan 3, 1979	Republican	Carl Curtis (Minden)	14
18	Edward Zorinsky (Omaha)	Democratic	Dec 28, 1976 – Mar 6, 1987	Elected in 1976.	19	95th	19	Re-elected in 1972. Retired.	Jan 1, 1955 – Jan 3, 1979	Republican	Carl Curtis (Minden)	14
18	Edward Zorinsky (Omaha)	Democratic	Dec 28, 1976 – Mar 6, 1987	Elected in 1976.	19	96th	20	Elected in 1978.	Jan 3, 1979 – Jan 3, 1997	Democratic	J. James Exon (Lincoln)	15
18	Edward Zorinsky (Omaha)	Democratic	Dec 28, 1976 – Mar 6, 1987	Elected in 1976.	19	97th	20	Elected in 1978.	Jan 3, 1979 – Jan 3, 1997	Democratic	J. James Exon (Lincoln)	15
18	Edward Zorinsky (Omaha)	Democratic	Dec 28, 1976 – Mar 6, 1987	Re-elected in 1982. Died.	20	98th	20	Elected in 1978.	Jan 3, 1979 – Jan 3, 1997	Democratic	J. James Exon (Lincoln)	15
18	Edward Zorinsky (Omaha)	Democratic	Dec 28, 1976 – Mar 6, 1987	Re-elected in 1982. Died.	20	99th	21	Re-elected in 1984.	Jan 3, 1979 – Jan 3, 1997	Democratic	J. James Exon (Lincoln)	15
18	Edward Zorinsky (Omaha)	Democratic	Dec 28, 1976 – Mar 6, 1987	Re-elected in 1982. Died.	20	100th	21	Re-elected in 1984.	Jan 3, 1979 – Jan 3, 1997	Democratic	J. James Exon (Lincoln)	15
Vacant			Mar 6, 1987 – Mar 11, 1987		20	100th	21	Re-elected in 1984.	Jan 3, 1979 – Jan 3, 1997	Democratic	J. James Exon (Lincoln)	15
19	David Karnes (Omaha)	Republican	Mar 11, 1987 – Jan 3, 1989	Appointed to finish Zorinsky's term. Lost election to full term.	20	100th	21	Re-elected in 1984.	Jan 3, 1979 – Jan 3, 1997	Democratic	J. James Exon (Lincoln)	15
20	Bob Kerrey (Omaha)	Democratic	Jan 3, 1989 – Jan 3, 2001	Elected in 1988.	21	101st	21	Re-elected in 1984.	Jan 3, 1979 – Jan 3, 1997	Democratic	J. James Exon (Lincoln)	15
20	Bob Kerrey (Omaha)	Democratic	Jan 3, 1989 – Jan 3, 2001	Elected in 1988.	21	102nd	22	Re-elected in 1990. Retired.	Jan 3, 1979 – Jan 3, 1997	Democratic	J. James Exon (Lincoln)	15
20	Bob Kerrey (Omaha)	Democratic	Jan 3, 1989 – Jan 3, 2001	Elected in 1988.	21	103rd	22	Re-elected in 1990. Retired.	Jan 3, 1979 – Jan 3, 1997	Democratic	J. James Exon (Lincoln)	15
20	Bob Kerrey (Omaha)	Democratic	Jan 3, 1989 – Jan 3, 2001	Re-elected in 1994. Retired.	22	104th	22	Re-elected in 1990. Retired.	Jan 3, 1979 – Jan 3, 1997	Democratic	J. James Exon (Lincoln)	15
20	Bob Kerrey (Omaha)	Democratic	Jan 3, 1989 – Jan 3, 2001	Re-elected in 1994. Retired.	22	105th	23	Elected in 1996.	Jan 3, 1997 – Jan 3, 2009	Republican	Chuck Hagel (Omaha)	16
20	Bob Kerrey (Omaha)	Democratic	Jan 3, 1989 – Jan 3, 2001	Re-elected in 1994. Retired.	22	106th	23	Elected in 1996.	Jan 3, 1997 – Jan 3, 2009	Republican	Chuck Hagel (Omaha)	16
21	Ben Nelson (Omaha)	Democratic	Jan 3, 2001 – Jan 3, 2013	Elected in 2000.	24	107th	23	Elected in 1996.	Jan 3, 1997 – Jan 3, 2009	Republican	Chuck Hagel (Omaha)	16
21	Ben Nelson (Omaha)	Democratic	Jan 3, 2001 – Jan 3, 2013	Elected in 2000.	24	108th	24	Re-elected in 2002. Retired.	Jan 3, 1997 – Jan 3, 2009	Republican	Chuck Hagel (Omaha)	16
21	Ben Nelson (Omaha)	Democratic	Jan 3, 2001 – Jan 3, 2013	Elected in 2000.	24	109th	24	Re-elected in 2002. Retired.	Jan 3, 1997 – Jan 3, 2009	Republican	Chuck Hagel (Omaha)	16
21	Ben Nelson (Omaha)	Democratic	Jan 3, 2001 – Jan 3, 2013	Re-elected in 2006. Retired.	25	110th	24	Re-elected in 2002. Retired.	Jan 3, 1997 – Jan 3, 2009	Republican	Chuck Hagel (Omaha)	16
21	Ben Nelson (Omaha)	Democratic	Jan 3, 2001 – Jan 3, 2013	Re-elected in 2006. Retired.	25	111th	25	Elected in 2008. Retired.	Jan 3, 2009 – Jan 3, 2015	Republican	Mike Johanns (Omaha)	17
21	Ben Nelson (Omaha)	Democratic	Jan 3, 2001 – Jan 3, 2013	Re-elected in 2006. Retired.	25	112th	25	Elected in 2008. Retired.	Jan 3, 2009 – Jan 3, 2015	Republican	Mike Johanns (Omaha)	17
22	Deb Fischer (Lincoln)	Republican	Jan 3, 2013 – present	Elected in 2012.	26	113th	25	Elected in 2008. Retired.	Jan 3, 2009 – Jan 3, 2015	Republican	Mike Johanns (Omaha)	17
22	Deb Fischer (Lincoln)	Republican	Jan 3, 2013 – present	Elected in 2012.	26	114th	26	Elected in 2014.	Jan 3, 2015 – Jan 8, 2023	Republican	Ben Sasse (Fremont)	18
22	Deb Fischer (Lincoln)	Republican	Jan 3, 2013 – present	Elected in 2012.	26	115th	26	Elected in 2014.	Jan 3, 2015 – Jan 8, 2023	Republican	Ben Sasse (Fremont)	18
22	Deb Fischer (Lincoln)	Republican	Jan 3, 2013 – present	Re-elected in 2018.	27	116th	26	Elected in 2014.	Jan 3, 2015 – Jan 8, 2023	Republican	Ben Sasse (Fremont)	18
22	Deb Fischer (Lincoln)	Republican	Jan 3, 2013 – present	Re-elected in 2018.	27	117th	27	Re-elected in 2020. Resigned to become President of the University of Florida.	Jan 3, 2015 – Jan 8, 2023	Republican	Ben Sasse (Fremont)	18
22	Deb Fischer (Lincoln)	Republican	Jan 3, 2013 – present	Re-elected in 2018.	27	118th	27	Re-elected in 2020. Resigned to become President of the University of Florida.	Jan 3, 2015 – Jan 8, 2023	Republican	Ben Sasse (Fremont)	18
22	Deb Fischer (Lincoln)	Republican	Jan 3, 2013 – present	Re-elected in 2018.	27	118th	27		Jan 8, 2023 – Jan 12, 2023	Vacant		
22	Deb Fischer (Lincoln)	Republican	Jan 3, 2013 – present	Re-elected in 2018.	27	118th	27	Appointed to continue Sasse's term. Elected in 2024 to finish Sasse's term.	Jan 12, 2023 – present	Republican	Pete Ricketts (Omaha)	19
22	Deb Fischer (Lincoln)	Republican	Jan 3, 2013 – present	Re-elected in 2024.	28	119th	27	Appointed to continue Sasse's term. Elected in 2024 to finish Sasse's term.	Jan 12, 2023 – present	Republican	Pete Ricketts (Omaha)	19
22	Deb Fischer (Lincoln)	Republican	Jan 3, 2013 – present	Re-elected in 2024.	28	120th	28	Re-elected in 2026.	Jan 12, 2023 – present	Republican	Pete Ricketts (Omaha)	19
22	Deb Fischer (Lincoln)	Republican	Jan 3, 2013 – present	Re-elected in 2024.	28	121st	28	Re-elected in 2026.	Jan 12, 2023 – present	Republican	Pete Ricketts (Omaha)	19
To be determined in the 2030 election.					29	122nd	28	Re-elected in 2026.	Jan 12, 2023 – present	Republican	Pete Ricketts (Omaha)	19
To be determined in the 2030 election.					29	123rd	29	To be determined in the 2032 election.				

== See also ==
- Elections in Nebraska
- List of United States representatives from Nebraska
- Nebraska's congressional delegations
