= Dwight Griswold =

American politician (1893–1954)

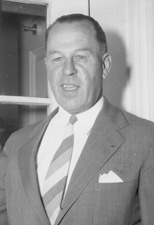

United States Senator from Nebraska
- In office November 5, 1952 – April 12, 1954
- Preceded by: Fred A. Seaton
- Succeeded by: Eva Bowring

25th Governor of Nebraska
- In office January 9, 1941 – January 9, 1947
- Lieutenant: William E. Johnson; Roy W. Johnson
- Preceded by: Roy Cochran
- Succeeded by: Val Peterson

Head of the American Mission for Aid to Greece
- In office 1947–1948
- President: Harry S. Truman

Director of the Internal Affairs and Communications Division of the Allied Control Council
- In office 1947
- Appointed by: Harry S. Truman
- Succeeded by: George B. McKibbin

Member of the Nebraska Senate
- In office 1925–1929

Member of the Nebraska House of Representatives
- In office 1920

Personal details
- Born: Dwight Palmer Griswold; November 27, 1893 Harrison, Nebraska, U.S.
- Died: April 12, 1954 (aged 60) Bethesda, Maryland, U.S.
- Party: Republican

Dwight Palmer Griswold (November 27, 1893 – April 12, 1954) was an American publisher and politician from the U.S. state of Nebraska. He served as the 25th governor of Nebraska from 1941 to 1947, and in the United States Senate from 1952 until his death in 1954. Griswold was a member of the Republican Party.

== Early life ==
Griswold was born in Harrison, Nebraska, and attended public schools in Gordon, Nebraska. He attended the Kearney Military Academy and Nebraska Wesleyan University. Griswold received a B.A. degree from the University of Nebraska in Lincoln in 1914.

Griswold served as an infantry sergeant on the U.S.–Mexico border from 1916 to 1917, and became a captain in field artillery during World War I.

== Career ==
Griswold was the editor and publisher of the Gordon Journal in Gordon, Nebraska, from 1922 to 1940. He served in the Nebraska House of Representatives in 1920 and in the Nebraska Senate from 1925 to 1929. He was an unsuccessful candidate for governor in 1932, 1934, and 1936. He was elected governor in 1940 and reelected in 1942 and 1944. Griswold challenged Sen. Hugh A. Butler in the state's 1946 Republican primary, but was badly defeated.

Griswold served in the Military Government of Germany in 1947 and was chief of the American mission for aid to Greece from 1947 to 1948. He was elected in 1952 to the United States Senate to complete an unexpired term scheduled to end on January 3, 1955, but died on April 12, 1954, in the Bethesda Naval Hospital of a heart attack. Griswold was the third of six Senators to serve during the fifteenth Senate term for Nebraska's Class 2 seat, from January 3, 1949 to January 3, 1955. He is interred at Fairview Cemetery in Scottsbluff, Nebraska.

== Legacy ==
Griswold is a member of the Nebraska Hall of Fame, inducted in 1993.

Political offices
Preceded by Roy Cochran	Governor of Nebraska; January 9, 1941 – January 9, 1947	Succeeded by Val Peterson
U.S. Senate
Preceded by Fred A. Seaton	U.S. senator (Class 2) from Nebraska; November 5, 1952 – April 12, 1954; Served alongside: Hugh A. Butler	Succeeded by Eva Bowring
Party political offices
Preceded by Arthur J. Weaver	Republican nominee for Governor of Nebraska; 1932, 1934, 1936	Succeeded by Charles J. Warner
Preceded by Charles J. Warner	Republican nominee for Governor of Nebraska; 1940, 1942, 1944	Succeeded by Val Peterson
Preceded by Kenneth S. Wherry	Republican nominee for U.S. Senator from Nebraska (Class 2); 1952	Succeeded by Hazel Abel
