= 1946 United States Senate election in Nebraska =

- November 5, 1946
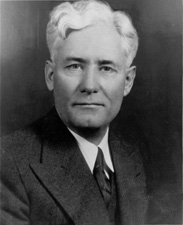

Nominee	Hugh A. Butler	John E. Mekota
Party	Republican	Democratic
Popular vote	271,208	111,751
Percentage	70.82%	29.18%
- County results Butler: 50–60% 60–70% 70–80% 80–90% Mekota: 60–70%
U.S. senator before election
Hugh A. Butler
Republican
Elected U.S. Senator
Hugh A. Butler
Republican

The 1946 United States Senate election in Nebraska took place on November 5, 1946. The incumbent Senator, Hugh A. Butler, was re-elected to a second term in a landslide, defeating John E. Mekota.

== Democratic primary ==
=== Candidates ===
- John E. Mekota, State Senator
- George W. Olsen, 1944 Democratic nominee for Governor, cafeteria busboy

=== Results ===
Democratic primary results
Party	Candidate	Votes	%
Democratic	John E. Mekota	35,447	69.57%
Democratic	George W. Olsen	15,505	30.43%
Total votes		50,952	100.00%

== Republican primary ==
=== Candidates ===
- Hugh A. Butler, incumbent Senator
- Dwight Griswold, Governor of Nebraska

=== Results ===
Republican primary
Party	Candidate	Votes	%
Republican	Hugh A. Butler (inc.)	87,589	63.78%
Republican	Dwight Griswold	48,208	35.11%
Republican	Robert W. Ardts	1,526	1.11%
Total votes		137,323	100.00%

== Results ==
1946 United States Senate election in Nebraska
Party	Candidate	Votes	%	±%
Republican	Hugh A. Butler (inc.)	271,208	70.82%	+13.82%
Democratic	John E. Mekota	111,751	29.18%	−12.31%
Majority		159,457	41.64%	+26.13%
Total votes		382,958	100.00%	
Republican hold				
