= 1940 United States Senate election in Nebraska =

- November 5, 1940
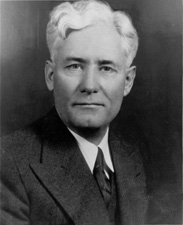

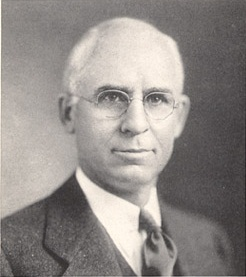
Nominee	Hugh A. Butler	Robert Leroy Cochran
Party	Republican	Democratic
Popular vote	340,250	247,659
Percentage	57.00%	41.49%
- County results Butler: 40–50% 50–60% 60–70% 70–80% Cochran: 40–50% 50–60%
U.S. senator before election
Edward R. Burke
Democratic
Elected U.S. Senator
Hugh A. Butler
Republican

The 1940 United States Senate election in Nebraska took place on November 5, 1940. Hugh A. Butler was elected for the first time, defeating Governor Robert Leroy Cochran. Edward R. Burke, the incumbent Senator, was defeated by Cochran in the primary. Butler performed on par with Wendell Willkie, who won the state with 57.2% in the presidential election.

== Democratic primary ==
=== Candidates ===
- Edward R. Burke, incumbent Senator
- Robert Leroy Cochran, Governor of Nebraska

=== Results ===
Democratic primary results
Party	Candidate	Votes	%
Democratic	Robert Leroy Cochran	84,869	58.42%
Democratic	Edward R. Burke (inc.)	60,400	41.58%
Total votes		145,269	100.00%

== Republican primary ==
=== Candidates ===
- Hugh A. Butler, Republican National committeeman for Nebraska
- Albert W. Jefferis, former Representative for Nebraska's 2nd congressional district
- Adam McMullen, former Governor of Nebraska
- John H. Miller, former railway commissioner
- Arthur J. Weaver, former Governor of Nebraska

=== Results ===
Republican primary results
Party	Candidate	Votes	%
Republican	Hugh A. Butler	61,756	37.15%
Republican	Arthur J. Weaver	56,331	33.89%
Republican	John H. Miller	17,016	10.24%
Republican	Adam McMullen	16,359	9.84%
Republican	Albert W. Jefferis	14,765	8.88%
Total votes		166,227	100.00%

== Results ==
1940 United States Senate election in Nebraska
Party	Candidate	Votes	%	±%
Republican	Hugh A. Butler	340,250	57.00%	+14.14%
Democratic	Robert Leroy Cochran	247,659	41.49%	−13.81%
Independent	Albert F. Ruthven	8,982	1.50%	—
Majority		92,591	15.51%	+3.07%
Total votes		596,891	100.00%	
Republican gain from Democratic				
