= Hugh A. Butler =

United States Senator from Nebraska

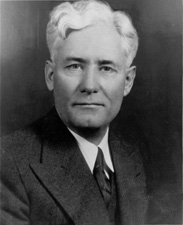
- Butler in 1941

United States Senator from Nebraska
- In office January 3, 1941 – July 1, 1954
- Preceded by: Edward R. Burke
- Succeeded by: Samuel W. Reynolds

Personal details
- Born: Hugh Alfred Butler; February 28, 1878 Missouri Valley, Iowa, U.S.
- Died: July 1, 1954 (aged 76) Bethesda, Maryland, U.S.
- Party: Republican

Hugh Alfred Butler (February 28, 1878 – July 1, 1954) was an American Republican politician from Nebraska.

== Life and career ==
Hugh Butler was born on a farm near Missouri Valley, Iowa on February 28, 1878. He graduated from Doane College at Crete, Nebraska in 1900, where, in 1897, he founded the Alpha Omega Fraternity. Butler toiled as a construction engineer with the Chicago, Burlington and Quincy Railroad from 1900 to 1908. He entered politics as a member of the city board of Curtis, Nebraska from 1908 to 1913 and as a member of the board of education of Omaha, Nebraska. Meanwhile, from 1908 to 1940, Butler worked in flour-milling and in the grain business.

Hugh Butler became a member of the Republican National Committee in 1936 and served until 1940 when he was elected to the United States Senate. He was reelected twice, in 1946 and 1952. Butler served as the chairman of the Committee on Public Lands in the 80th Congress and as the chairman of the Committee on Interior and Insular Affairs in the 83rd Congress. A steadfast opponent of statehood for the Alaska Territory during most of his career in the Senate, he changed his mind during the last few months of his life. Butler died in office on the night of July 1, 1954, following a stroke that had occurred earlier in the day.

Butler and his Nebraska colleague, Senator Kenneth Wherry, are best known for an intense opposition to international activities by the government, including entry into World War II, the Cold War, and the Korea War. He reflected the isolationism of the large German-American element in Nebraska. He vigorously opposed any loans or aid to Europe, including the Marshall Plan. He did not believe that the Soviet Union threatened Nebraska's interest, and he strongly opposed the Truman Doctrine, and NATO. Whatever the issue, he could be counted on as a strong opponent of the Presidency of Harry S. Truman.

Robert B. Crosby, governor of Nebraska at the time of Butler's death, appointed Samuel Williams Reynolds to fill his seat.

== See also ==
- List of members of the United States Congress who died in office (1950–1999)

== Sources ==
1. Bernard Lemelin, "Isolationist Voices in the Truman Era: Nebraska Senators Hugh Butler and Kenneth Wherry." Great Plains Quarterly 37.2 (2017): 83-109.
2. "Butler, Hugh Alfred". The Political Graveyard.
3. "Butler, Hugh Alfred". Biographical Directory of the United States Congress.

Party political offices
Preceded by Robert G. Simmons	Republican nominee for U.S. Senator from Nebraska (Class 1); 1940, 1946, 1952	Succeeded by Roman Hruska
U.S. Senate
Preceded by Edward R. Burke	U.S. senator (Class 1) from Nebraska; January 3, 1941 – July 1, 1954; Served alongside: George W. Norris, Kenneth S. Wherry, Fred A. Seaton, Dwight Griswold, Eva Bowring	Succeeded by Samuel W. Reynolds
