= Samuel W. Reynolds =

American politician

Samuel Williams Reynolds
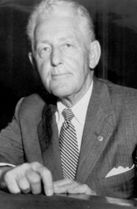

United States Senator from Nebraska
- In office July 3, 1954 – November 7, 1954
- Appointed by: Robert B. Crosby
- Preceded by: Hugh A. Butler
- Succeeded by: Roman Hruska

Personal details
- Born: August 11, 1890 Omaha, Nebraska, U.S.
- Died: March 20, 1988 (aged 97) Omaha, Nebraska, U.S.
- Party: Republican

Samuel Williams Reynolds (August 11, 1890 – March 20, 1988) was a Republican United States senator from Nebraska.

== Biography ==
Reynolds was born in Omaha, Nebraska, on August 11, 1890. In 1908, he engaged in the Omaha wholesale coal business.

During World War I, Reynolds served in the United States Army Air Service. He later became a colonel and served as the director of the Army Specialist Corps in Omaha from 1942 to 1943. He was a delegate to the 1936 Republican National Convention.

In 1954, Reynolds was appointed by Governor Robert B. Crosby to the United States Senate to fill the open seat caused by the death of Hugh Butler. He declined to run for the office that year and resumed selling coal. He subsequently became a member of the Omaha City Council from 1957 to 1958.

Reynolds lived in Omaha until his death in 1988. He was interred at Forest Lawn Memorial Park.

U.S. Senate
| Preceded by Hugh Butler | U.S. senator (Class 1) from Nebraska; July 3, 1954 – November 7, 1954; Served alongside: Eva Bowring | Succeeded by Roman Hruska |
Honorary titles
| Preceded by Stephen Young | Oldest living U.S. senator December 1, 1984 – March 20, 1988 | Succeeded by Gladys Pyle |
