= 1934 United States Senate elections in Nebraska =

1934 United States Senate election in Nebraska
- November 6, 1934
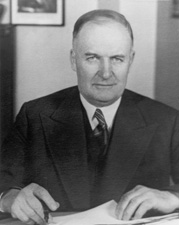

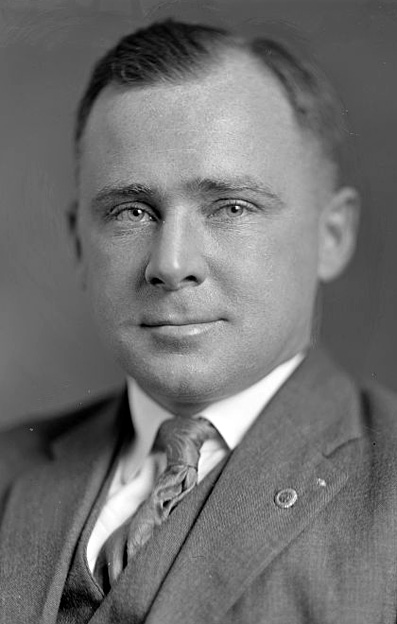
Nominee	Edward R. Burke	Robert G. Simmons
Party	Democratic	Republican
Popular vote	305,958	237,126
Percentage	55.30%	42.86%
- County results Burke: 40–50% 50–60% 60–70% Simmons: 40–50% 50–60% 60–70%
U.S. senator before election
Richard C. Hunter
Democratic
Elected U.S. Senator
Edward R. Burke
Democratic

The 1934 United States Senate elections in Nebraska took place on November 6, 1934. Incumbent Republican Senator Robert B. Howell died in office on March 11, 1933. Democrat William H. Thompson was appointed by Governor Charles W. Bryan to fill Howell's seat. Two elections for the same Senate seat were held on the same day; one as a special election to fill the remainder of Howell's six-year term, and another to elect a Senator to serve the next six-year term.

Senator Thompson did not seek re-election. Former State Representative Richard C. Hunter, a Democrat, won the special election to serve out the remaining two months of the term. On the same day, Democratic Congressman Edward R. Burke won the election for the next term.

This would be the last time a Democrat won a Senate election in Nebraska until 1976, over 40 years later.

== Democratic primary ==
=== Regular election ===
==== Candidates ====
- Edward R. Burke, U.S. Representative from Nebraska's 2nd congressional district
- Charles W. Bryan, Governor of Nebraska
- Willis E. Reed, former Attorney General of Nebraska
- Floyd L. Bollen, Railway Commissioner
- Anthony T. Monahan, member of the Nebraska Livestock Commission

==== Results ====
Democratic primary results
Party	Candidate	Votes	%
Democratic	Edward R. Burke	123,833	61.35%
Democratic	Charles W. Bryan	52,385	25.95%
Democratic	Willis E. Reed	11,817	5.85%
Democratic	Floyd L. Bollen	9,652	4.78%
Democratic	Anthony T. Monahan	4,161	2.06%
Democratic	Scattering	14	0.01%
Total votes		201,862	100.00%

=== Special election ===
==== Candidates ====
- Richard C. Hunter, former State Representative
- Albert W. Weichel, motor salesman

==== Results ====
Democratic special primary results
Party	Candidate	Votes	%
Democratic	Richard C. Hunter	99,426	67.41%
Democratic	Albert W. Weichel	48,050	32.58%
Democratic	Scattering	10	0.01%
Total votes		147,486	100.00%

== Republican primary ==
=== Regular election ===
==== Candidates ====
- Robert G. Simmons, former U.S. Representative from Nebraska's 6th congressional district
- Kenneth S. Wherry, former State Senator, 1932 Republican candidate for Governor
- Robert Smith, Douglas County Clerk of the District Court
- Barton Green, Chairman of the Lancaster County Republican Party
- U. S. Renne, Fort Calhoun farmer

==== Results ====
Republican primary
Party	Candidate	Votes	%
Republican	Robert G. Simmons	77,841	46.31%
Republican	Kenneth S. Wherry	41,777	24.85%
Republican	Robert Smith	34,067	20.27%
Republican	Barton Green	10,683	6.36%
Republican	U. S. Renne	3,718	2.21%
Republican	Scattering	15	0.01%
Total votes		168,101	100.00%

=== Special election ===
==== Candidates ====
- J. H. Kemp, former State Senator
- Dana Van Dusen, general counsel to the Metropolitan Utilities District
- J. S. Kroh, former State Senator
- A. A. Rezac, Omaha attorney

==== Results ====
Republican primary
Party	Candidate	Votes	%
Republican	J. H. Kemp	58,551	44.63%
Republican	Dana Van Dusen	36,543	27.86%
Republican	J. S. Kroh	23,926	18.24%
Republican	A. A. Rezac	12,154	9.27%
Republican	Scattering	6	0.00%
Total votes		131,180	100.00%

== General election ==
=== Regular election ===
1934 United States Senate election in Nebraska
Party	Candidate	Votes	%	±%
Democratic	Edward R. Burke	305,958	55.30%	+16.58%
Republican	Robert G. Simmons	237,126	42.86%	−18.42%
Independent	Henry Hoffman	7,670	1.39%	—
Independent	E. D. O'Sullivan (write-in)	2,501	0.45%	—
Write-in		44	0.01%	—
Majority		68,832	12.44%	−10.12%
Total votes		553,299	100.00%	
Democratic hold				

=== Special election ===
1934 United States Senate special election in Nebraska
Party	Candidate	Votes	%	±%
Democratic	Richard C. Hunter	281,421	56.45%	+17.73%
Republican	J. H. Kemp	217,106	43.55%	−17.73%
Write-in		24	0.00%	—
Majority		64,315	12.90%	−9.66%
Total votes		498,551	100.00%	
Democratic hold				
