= 1952 United States Senate election in Nebraska =

- November 4, 1952
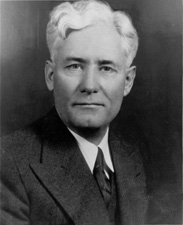

| Nominee | Hugh A. Butler | Stanley D. Long |
| Party | Republican | Democratic |
| Popular vote | 408,971 | 164,660 |
| Percentage | 69.11% | 27.83% |
- County results Butler: 50–60% 60–70% 70–80% 80–90%
U.S. senator before election
Hugh A. Butler
Republican
Elected U.S. Senator
Hugh A. Butler
Republican

The 1952 United States Senate election in Nebraska took place on November 2, 1952. Incumbent Republican Senator Hugh A. Butler ran for re-election to a third term. He was challenged by Democratic nominee Stanley D. Long, a former member of the University of Nebraska Board of Regents, and independent candidate Dwight Dell, a farmer and former state director of the Christian Rural Overseas Program. Butler won re-election in a landslide, matching Republican presidential nominee Dwight D. Eisenhower's performance in the state.

== Democratic primary ==
=== Candidates ===
- Stanley D. Long, former member of the University of Nebraska Board of Regents

=== Results ===
Democratic primary results
| Party | Candidate | Votes | % |
|---|---|---|---|
| Democratic | Stanley D. Long | 86,974 | 99.57% |
| Democratic | Scattering | 373 | 0.43% |
| Total votes | | 87,347 | 100.00% |

== Republican primary ==
=== Candidates ===
- Hugh A. Butler, incumbent Senator
- Val Peterson, Governor of Nebraska

=== Results ===
Republican primary results
| Party | Candidate | Votes | % |
|---|---|---|---|
| Republican | Hugh A. Butler (inc.) | 125,701 | 57.79% |
| Republican | Val Peterson | 91,676 | 42.15% |
| Republican | Scattering | 127 | 0.06% |
| Total votes | | 217,504 | 100.00% |

== Results ==
1952 United States Senate election in Nebraska
| Party | Candidate | Votes | % | ±% |
|---|---|---|---|---|
| Republican | Hugh A. Butler (inc.) | 408,971 | 69.11% | −1.71% |
| Democratic | Stanley D. Long | 164,660 | 27.83% | −1.35% |
| Independent | Dwight Dell | 18,087 | 3.06% | — |
| Write-in | | 31 | 0.01% | — |
| Majority | | 244,311 | 41.28% | −0.36% |
| Turnout | | 591,749 | | |
| Republican hold | | | | |
