= Edward Zorinsky =

American politician (1928–1987)

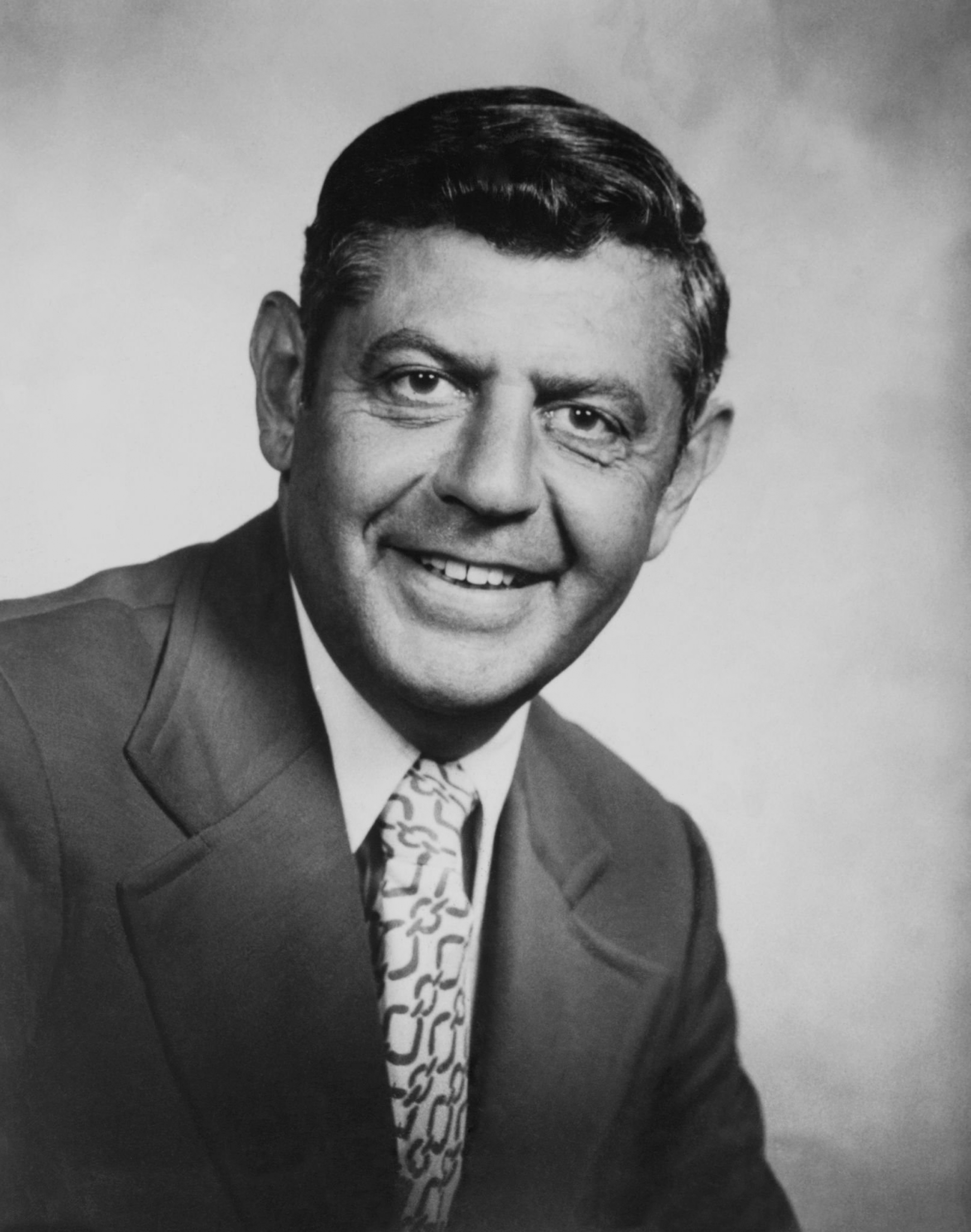
- Official portrait, 1977

United States Senator from Nebraska
- In office December 28, 1976 – March 6, 1987
- Preceded by: Roman Hruska
- Succeeded by: David Karnes

Mayor of Omaha
- In office 1973–1976
- Preceded by: Eugene A. Leahy
- Succeeded by: Robert Cunningham

Personal details
- Born: Edward Zorinsky; November 11, 1928 Omaha, Nebraska, U.S.
- Died: March 6, 1987 (aged 58) Omaha, Nebraska, U.S.
- Resting place: Beth El Cemetery; Ralston, Nebraska
- Party: Republican (before 1976); Democratic (1976–1987)
- Spouse: Cecile "Cece" Rottman
- Education: University of Minnesota; Creighton University; University of Nebraska; Harvard University

Military service
- Branch/service: United States Army
- Years of service: 1949–1962
- Unit: Reserves

Edward Zorinsky (November 11, 1928 – March 6, 1987) was an American businessman and politician who served as a Democrat in the United States Senate from 1976 until his death in 1987. He represented Nebraska and had previously served as mayor of Omaha, elected as a Republican. He was the first Jewish person elected to statewide office in Nebraska.

== Early life and career ==
Zorinsky was born and raised in Omaha. His parents were Sonia (née Feldman) and Hymie Zorinsky, both Russian Jewish immigrants. He attended Saunders and Rosehill elementary schools and graduated from Central High School in 1945. Zorinsky attended the University of Minnesota from 1945 to 1946 and Creighton University from 1946 to 1948 before completing his studies at the University of Nebraska, where he received a Bachelor of Science degree in chemistry and zoology in 1949.

For twenty-three years, Zorinsky worked in the wholesale tobacco and candy business. He also served in the U.S. Army Reserve from 1949 to 1962. He enrolled at Harvard University in 1966 to pursue his graduate work, and later served as a member of the Nebraska Judicial Qualifications Commission from 1968 to 1971 and of the Board of Directors for Omaha Public Power District from 1969 to 1973. From 1973 to 1976, he served as Mayor of Omaha. He earned a great deal of popularity due to his response to a blizzard and a series of tornadoes that hit Omaha in 1975.

== U.S. Senate ==
In 1976, Zorinsky, a lifelong Republican, decided to run for the U.S. Senate after 22-year incumbent Roman Hruska decided not to seek re-election. However, when it became apparent that he would not win the Republican nomination, he switched parties and ran as a conservative Democrat. He defeated Hess Dyas, a former state party chairman, for the Democratic nomination. In the general election, he defeated U.S. Representative John Y. McCollister by a margin of 53% to 47%. With his victory, he became the first Democratic Senator elected from Nebraska since 1934 and the first Jewish person to ever to win a statewide election in Nebraska. He was re-elected to a second term in 1982, receiving over 66% of the vote.

As a Senator, Zorinsky was a moderate to conservative Democrat, voting with Republicans on some significant issues. He was courted by the Republicans to rejoin their party in 1982. Zorinsky threatened to change parties in 1986, but ultimately never made the switch. He served as chairman of the Senate Subcommittee on Western Hemisphere Affairs, in which position he advocated for financial and military assistance to the new Sandinista National Liberation Front regime in Nicaragua in 1979.

=== Death and legacy ===
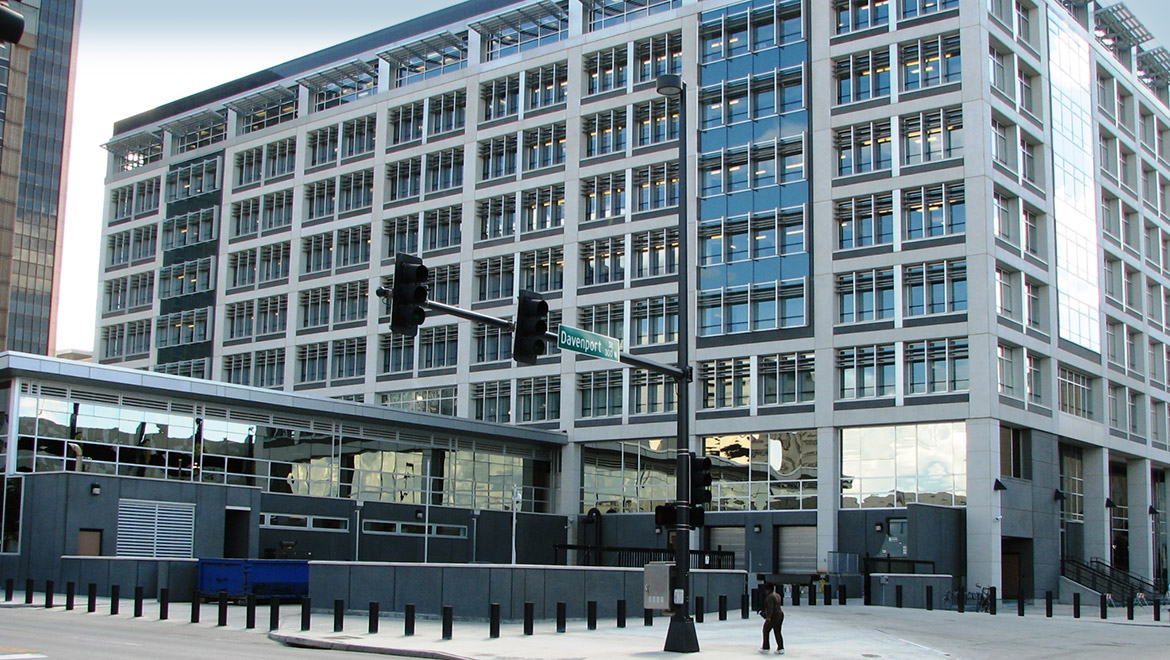
The Edward Zorinsky Federal Building

Zorinsky died after suffering a heart attack at the 1987 Omaha Press Club gridiron show, shortly after performing a song and dance routine.

After his death, one of the largest man-made lakes in Nebraska was named after him: Ed Zorinsky Lake and the surrounding Zorinsky Lake Park are located in the city of Omaha. The Edward Zorinsky Federal Building in Omaha is also named in his honor.

== See also ==
- List of Jewish members of the United States Congress
- List of members of the United States Congress who died in office (1950–1999)

Political offices
Preceded by Eugene A. Leahy	Mayor of Omaha; 1973–1976	Succeeded by Robert G. Cunningham
Party political offices
Preceded by Frank B. Morrison	Democratic nominee for U.S. Senator (Class 1) from Nebraska; 1976, 1982	Succeeded by Bob Kerrey
U.S. Senate
Preceded by Roman Hruska	U.S. senator (Class 1) from Nebraska; December 28, 1976 – March 6, 1987; Served alongside: Carl Curtis, J. James Exon	Succeeded by David Karnes
Preceded by Walter Dee Huddleston	Ranking Member of the Senate Agriculture Committee; 1985–1987	Succeeded by Jesse Helms
