= Roman Hruska =

American politician (1904–1999)

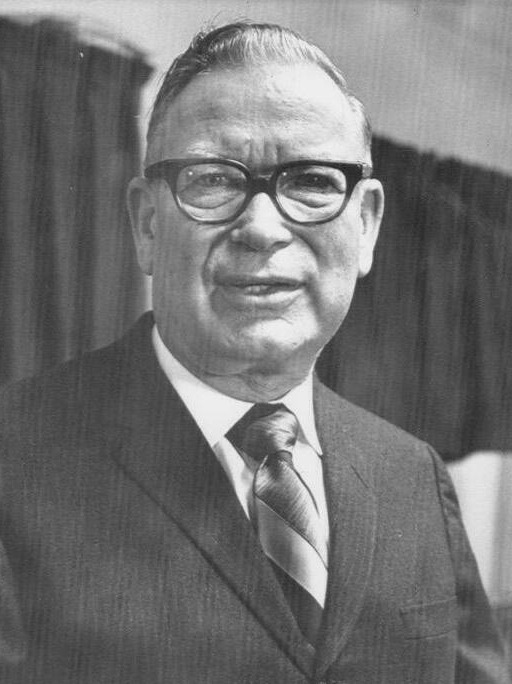
- Hruska in 1969

United States Senator from Nebraska
- In office November 8, 1954 – December 27, 1976
- Preceded by: Samuel W. Reynolds
- Succeeded by: Edward Zorinsky

Member of the U.S. House of Representatives from Nebraska's 2nd district
- In office January 3, 1953 – November 8, 1954
- Preceded by: Howard Buffett
- Succeeded by: Jackson B. Chase

Personal details
- Born: Roman Lee Hruska; August 16, 1904 David City, Nebraska, U.S.
- Died: April 25, 1999 (aged 94) Omaha, Nebraska, U.S.
- Party: Republican
- Spouse: Victoria Kuncl
- Children: 3
- Education: University of Omaha; University of Chicago; Creighton University

Roman Lee Hruska (/ˈrʌskə/) (August 16, 1904 – April 25, 1999) was an American attorney and politician who served as a Republican U.S. senator from the state of Nebraska. Hruska was known as one of the most vocal conservatives in the Senate during the 1960s and 1970s.

Hruska was also co-founder of the Douglas Theatre Company, based in Nebraska.

== Life and career ==
Hruska was born in David City, Nebraska, one of 11 children of Czech immigrant parents. In 1917, his family moved to Omaha, Nebraska, where he graduated from high school. He attended the University of Omaha (now University of Nebraska–Omaha) and the University of Chicago Law School and graduated from the Creighton University School of Law in 1929. He returned to Omaha to practice law.

In 1944, Hruska first entered politics when he accepted a seat on the Douglas County, Nebraska, Board of Commissioners in place of a friend who recently resigned. He served as a regular member from 1944 to 1945 and as chair from 1945 to 1952. During his time on the board of commissioners, Hruska also sat on the advisory committee of the Nebraska Board of Control from 1947 to 1952. He was president of the Nebraska Association of County Officials from 1950 to 1951 and vice president of the National Association of County Officials from 1951 to 1952.

Hruska was elected to the United States House of Representatives from the Omaha-dominated second district of Nebraska in 1952. He served only part of one term, as he ran for a United States Senate seat in 1954, which was vacated by the death of Hugh Butler. Hruska won, was reelected in 1958, 1964 and 1970, and served in the Senate until his retirement in 1976. His opponent in 1958 and 1970 was Frank B. Morrison. Hruska did not run for reelection to a fourth full term.

Even after Nixon resigned, Hruska defended him and claimed Watergate only became a scandal as part of a partisan effort to attack Nixon.

Hruska became an influential member of the Senate Appropriations Committee and the Senate Judiciary Committee. Hruska voted in favor of the Civil Rights Acts of 1957, 1960, 1964, and 1968, as well as the 24th Amendment to the U.S. Constitution, the Voting Rights Act of 1965, and the confirmation of Thurgood Marshall to the U.S. Supreme Court. Though Congress was controlled by Democrats for his entire tenure in the Senate, he was known as a skillful legislator and was said to have influenced many of the federal criminal justice system's changes during his era. He was ranking minority member of the Judiciary Committee at the time of his retirement.

On October 10, 1978, President Carter signed into law a bill that renamed the U.S. Meat Animal Research Center (USMARC), located in Clay County, Nebraska, for Hruska. The Roman L. Hruska Federal Courthouse in Omaha is also named in his honor. Additionally, the Roman L. Hruska Law Center in Lincoln, Nebraska houses the Nebraska State Bar Association.

=== Mediocrity comments ===
In 1970, Hruska addressed the Senate, urging it to confirm Richard Nixon's nomination of G. Harrold Carswell to the Supreme Court. Responding to criticism that Carswell had been a mediocre judge, Hruska argued:

Even if he were mediocre, there are a lot of mediocre judges and people and lawyers. They are entitled to a little representation, aren't they, and a little chance? We can't have all Brandeises, Frankfurters and Cardozos.

Democrats seized upon these remarks, and the Carswell nomination failed.

== Retirement and personal life ==
Hruska moved back to Omaha in 1976 and lived there until his death. On April 10, 1999, he fell and broke his hip. He died fifteen days later from complications during treatment. He was buried in Bohemian Cemetery in Omaha.

Party political offices
Preceded by Hugh A. Butler	Republican nominee for U.S. Senator from Nebraska (Class 1); 1954, 1958, 1964, 1970	Succeeded by John Y. McCollister
U.S. House of Representatives
Preceded by Howard Buffett	Member of the U.S. House of Representatives from Nebraska's 2nd congressional district 1953–1954	Succeeded by Jackson B. Chase
U.S. Senate
Preceded by Samuel W. Reynolds	U.S. senator (Class 1) from Nebraska; 1954–1976; Served alongside: Hazel Abel, Carl T. Curtis	Succeeded by Edward Zorinsky
Preceded by Everett Dirksen	Ranking Member of the Senate Judiciary Committee; 1969–1976	Succeeded by Strom Thurmond
