= 85th United States Congress =

1957–1959 U.S. Congress

←	84th	86th	→
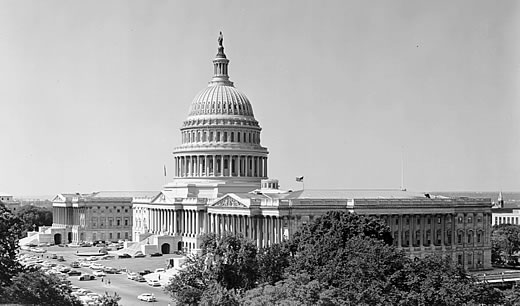
- United States Capitol (1956)

Overview
- Legislative body: United States Congress
- Jurisdiction: United States
- Term: January 3, 1957 – January 3, 1959

Senate
- Members: 96
- President: Richard Nixon (R)
- President pro tempore: Carl Hayden (D)
- Party control: Democratic

House of Representatives
- Members: 435
- Speaker: Sam Rayburn (D)
- Party control: Democratic

Sessions
- 1st: January 3, 1957 – August 30, 1957
- 2nd: January 7, 1958 – August 24, 1958

The 85th United States Congress was a meeting of the legislative branch of the United States federal government, composed of the United States Senate and the United States House of Representatives. It met in Washington, D.C. from January 3, 1957, to January 3, 1959, during the fifth and sixth years of Dwight Eisenhower's presidency. The apportionment of seats in the House of Representatives was based on the 1950 United States census.

Both chambers had a Democratic majority.

== Major events ==
- January 5, 1957: President Eisenhower announced the Eisenhower Doctrine in a special message to Congress
- January 20, 1957: Inauguration of President Dwight D. Eisenhower for a second term
- August 21, 1957: President Eisenhower announced a 2-year suspension of nuclear testing
- August 28, 1957: Senator Strom Thurmond set a record for the longest filibuster with his 24-hour, 18-minute speech against the Civil Rights Act of 1957
- September 24, 1957: Little Rock Crisis: President Eisenhower sent federal troops to Arkansas to provide safe passage into Central High School for the Little Rock Nine.
- October 4, 1957: The Soviet Union launched Sputnik 1, the first artificial satellite to orbit Earth
- October 21, 1957: The U.S. military sustained its first combat fatality in Vietnam
- November 7, 1957: Gaither Report called for more American missiles and fallout shelters
- November 25, 1957: President Eisenhower suffers from a stroke
- January 31, 1958: U.S. launched its first satellite, Explorer 1
- July 15, 1958: U.S intervenes in the Lebanon Crisis, the first major application of the Eisenhower Doctrine.
- October 1, 1958: NASA started operations

== Major legislation ==
- August 14, 1957: Airways Modernization Act, Pub. L. 85–133, 71 Stat. 349
- September 2, 1957: Price-Anderson Nuclear Industries Indemnity Act, Pub. L. 85–256, 71 Stat. 576
- September 9, 1957: Civil Rights Act of 1957, Pub. L. 85–315, 71 Stat. 634
- July 29, 1958: National Aeronautics and Space Act, Pub. L. 85–568, 72 Stat. 426
- 1958: Transportation Act of 1958, Pub. L. 85–625
- August 23, 1958: Federal Aviation Act of 1958, Pub. L. 85–726, 72 Stat. 731
- August 28, 1958: EURATOM Cooperation Act of 1958, Pub. L. 85–846, 72 Stat. 1084
- August 28, 1958: Military Construction Appropriation Act (Advanced Research Projects Agency), Pub. L. 85–852, 72 Stat. 1096
- September 2, 1958: National Defense Education Act, Pub. L. 85–864, 72 Stat. 1580
- 1958: Department of Defense Reorganization Act, Pub. L. 85–899
- 1958: Pasatore-Walter Immigration Act

== Party summary ==
=== Senate ===
	Party (shading shows control)		Total	Vacant
	Democratic (D)	Republican (R)	Total	Vacant
End of previous congress	47	49	96	0
Begin	49	47	96	0
End	50	45	95	1
Final voting share	52.6%	47.4%		
Beginning of next congress	64	34	98	0

=== House of Representatives ===
	Party (shading shows control)		Total	Vacant
	Democratic (D)	Republican (R)	Total	Vacant
End of previous congress	228	200	428	7
Begin	233	200	433	2
End	232	193	425	10
Final voting share	54.6%	45.4%		
Beginning of next congress	282	153	435	0

== Leadership ==
Senate President

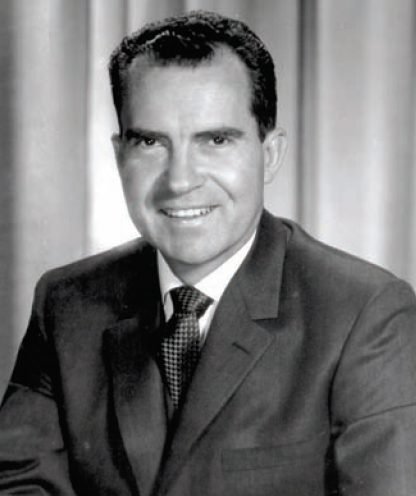
Richard Nixon (R)

Senate President pro tempore

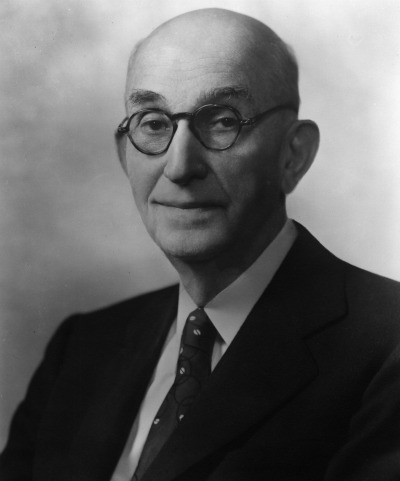
Carl Hayden (D)

House Speaker

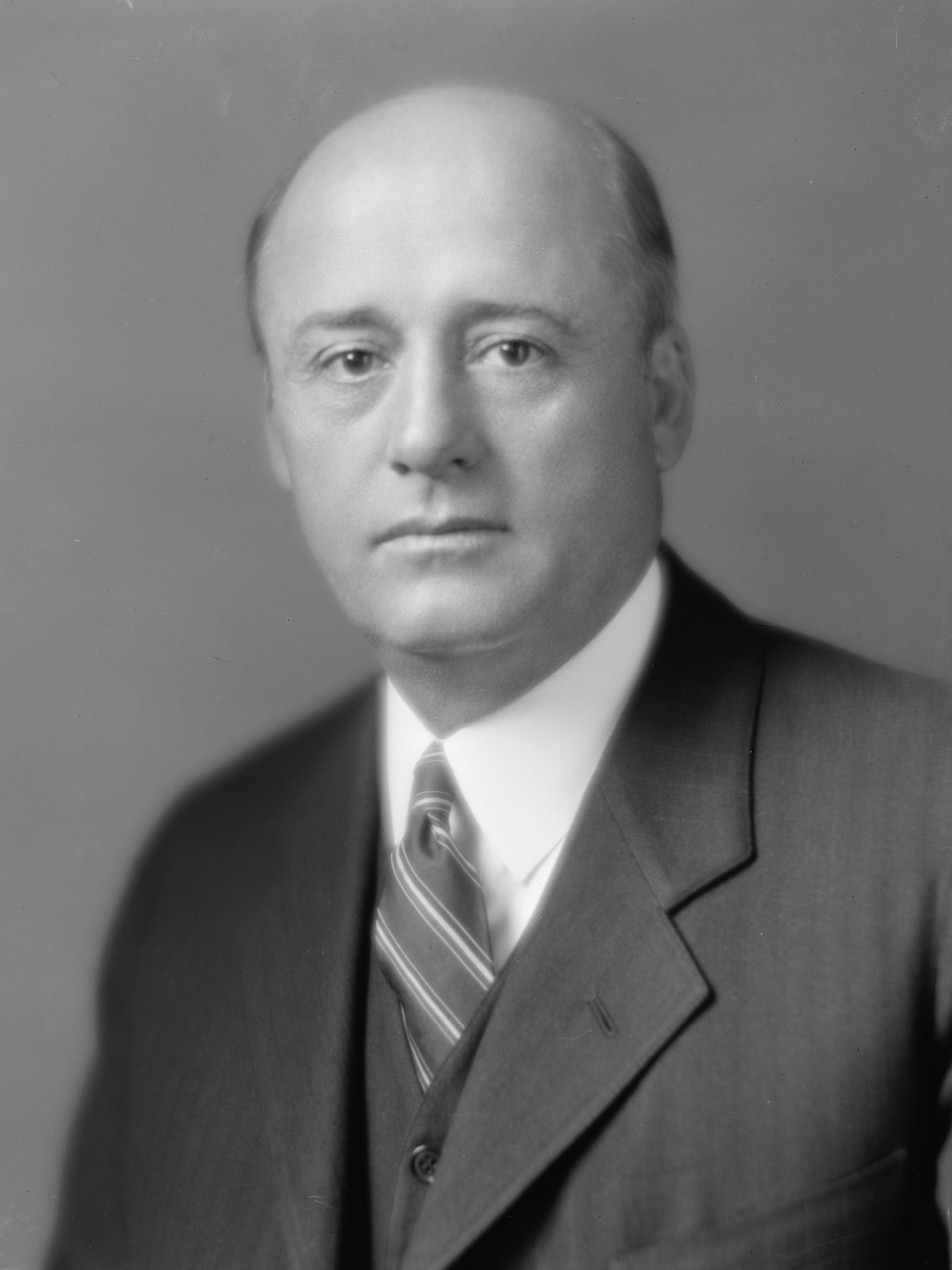
Sam Rayburn (D)

=== Senate ===
- President: Richard Nixon (R)
- President pro tempore: Carl Hayden (D)

==== Majority (Democratic) leadership ====
- Majority Leader and Conference Chairman: Lyndon B. Johnson
- Majority Whip: Mike Mansfield
- Democratic Caucus Secretary: Thomas C. Hennings Jr.

==== Minority (Republican) leadership ====
- Minority Leader: William Knowland
- Minority Whip: Everett Dirksen
- Republican Conference Chairman: Leverett Saltonstall
- Republican Conference Secretary: Milton Young
- National Senatorial Committee Chair: Everett Dirksen
- Policy Committee Chairman: Styles Bridges

=== House of Representatives ===
- Speaker: Sam Rayburn (D)

==== Majority (Democratic) leadership ====
- Majority Leader: John W. McCormack
- Majority Whip: Carl Albert
- Democratic Caucus Chairman: Melvin Price
- Democratic Campaign Committee Chairman: Michael J. Kirwan

==== Minority (Republican) leadership ====
- Minority Leader: Joseph W. Martin Jr.
- Minority Whip: Leslie C. Arends
- Republican Conference Chairman: Charles B. Hoeven
- Policy Committee Chairman: Joseph W. Martin Jr.
- Republican Campaign Committee Chairman: Richard M. Simpson

== Caucuses ==
- House Democratic Caucus
- Senate Democratic Caucus

== Members ==
=== Senate ===
Senators are popularly elected statewide every two years, with one-third beginning new six-year terms with each Congress. Preceding the names in the list below are Senate class numbers, which indicate the cycle of their election. Senators in each state are listed by class. In this Congress, Class 1 meant their term ended with this Congress, facing re-election in 1958; Class 2 meant their term began in the last Congress, facing re-election in 1960; and Class 3 meant their term began in this Congress, facing re-election in 1962.

==== Alabama ====
▌3. J. Lister Hill (D)
▌2. John Sparkman (D)

==== Arizona ====
▌3. Carl Hayden (D)
▌1. Barry Goldwater (R)

==== Arkansas ====
▌2. John L. McClellan (D)
▌3. J. William Fulbright (D)

==== California ====
▌1. William Knowland (R), until January 2, 1959
▌3. Thomas Kuchel (R)

==== Colorado ====
▌2. Gordon Allott (R)
▌3. John A. Carroll (D)

==== Connecticut ====
▌1. William A. Purtell (R)
▌3. Prescott Bush (R)

==== Delaware ====
▌1. John J. Williams (R)
▌2. J. Allen Frear Jr. (D)

==== Florida ====
▌1. Spessard Holland (D)
▌3. George Smathers (D)

==== Georgia ====
▌2. Richard Russell Jr. (D)
▌3. Herman Talmadge (D)

==== Idaho ====
▌2. Henry Dworshak (R)
▌3. Frank Church (D)

==== Illinois ====
▌2. Paul Douglas (D)
▌3. Everett M. Dirksen (R)

==== Indiana ====
▌1. William E. Jenner (R)
▌3. Homer E. Capehart (R)

==== Iowa ====
▌2. Thomas E. Martin (R)
▌3. Bourke B. Hickenlooper (R)

==== Kansas ====
▌2. Andrew Frank Schoeppel (R)
▌3. Frank Carlson (R)

==== Kentucky ====
▌2. John Sherman Cooper (R)
▌3. Thruston Ballard Morton (R)

==== Louisiana ====
▌2. Allen J. Ellender (D)
▌3. Russell B. Long (D)

==== Maine ====
▌1. Frederick G. Payne (R)
▌2. Margaret Chase Smith (R)

==== Maryland ====
▌1. James Glenn Beall (R)
▌3. John Marshall Butler (R)

==== Massachusetts ====
▌1. John F. Kennedy (D)
▌2. Leverett Saltonstall (R)

==== Michigan ====
▌1. Charles E. Potter (R)
▌2. Patrick V. McNamara (D)

==== Minnesota ====
▌1. Edward John Thye (R)
▌2. Hubert Humphrey (DFL) (Note: The Minnesota Democratic–Farmer–Labor Party (DFL) is the Minnesota affiliate of the U.S. Democratic Party and are counted as Democrats.)

==== Mississippi ====
▌1. John C. Stennis (D)
▌2. James Eastland (D)

==== Missouri ====
▌1. Stuart Symington (D)
▌3. Thomas C. Hennings Jr. (D)

==== Montana ====
▌1. Mike Mansfield (D)
▌2. James E. Murray (D)

==== Nebraska ====
▌1. Roman Hruska (R)
▌2. Carl Curtis (R)

==== Nevada ====
▌1. George W. Malone (R)
▌3. Alan Bible (D)

==== New Hampshire ====
▌2. Styles Bridges (R)
▌3. Norris Cotton (R)

==== New Jersey ====
▌1. Howard Alexander Smith (R)
▌2. Clifford P. Case (R)

==== New Mexico ====
▌1. Dennis Chávez (D)
▌2. Clinton Anderson (D)

==== New York ====
▌1. Irving Ives (R)
▌3. Jacob Javits (R), from January 9, 1957

==== North Carolina ====
▌2. W. Kerr Scott (D), until April 16, 1958

▌B. Everett Jordan (D), from April 19, 1958

▌3. Sam Ervin (D)

==== North Dakota ====
▌1. William Langer (R-NPL)
▌3. Milton Young (R)

==== Ohio ====
▌1. John W. Bricker (R)
▌3. Frank Lausche (D)

==== Oklahoma ====
▌2. Robert S. Kerr (D)
▌3. A. S. Mike Monroney (D)

==== Oregon ====
▌2. Richard L. Neuberger (D)
▌3. Wayne Morse (D)

==== Pennsylvania ====
▌1. Edward Martin (R)
▌3. Joseph S. Clark Jr. (D)

==== Rhode Island ====
▌1. John Pastore (D)
▌2. Theodore F. Green (D)

==== South Carolina ====
▌2. Strom Thurmond (D)
▌3. Olin D. Johnston (D)

==== South Dakota ====
▌2. Karl E. Mundt (R)
▌3. Francis Case (R)

==== Tennessee ====
▌1. Albert Gore Sr. (D)
▌2. Estes Kefauver (D)

==== Texas ====
▌1. Price Daniel (D), until January 14, 1957

▌William A. Blakley (D), January 15, 1957 – April 28, 1957
▌Ralph Yarborough (D), from April 29, 1957

▌2. Lyndon B. Johnson (D)

==== Utah ====
▌1. Arthur Vivian Watkins (R)
▌3. Wallace F. Bennett (R)

==== Vermont ====
▌1. Ralph Flanders (R)
▌3. George Aiken (R)

==== Virginia ====
▌1. Harry F. Byrd (D)
▌2. A. Willis Robertson (D)

==== Washington ====
▌1. Henry M. Jackson (D)
▌3. Warren G. Magnuson (D)

==== West Virginia ====
▌1. Chapman Revercomb (R)
▌2. Matthew M. Neely (D), until January 18, 1958

▌John D. Hoblitzell Jr. (R), January 25, 1958 – November 4, 1958
▌Jennings Randolph (D), from November 4, 1958

==== Wisconsin ====
▌1. Joseph McCarthy (R), until May 2, 1957

▌William Proxmire (D), from August 28, 1957

▌3. Alexander Wiley (R)

==== Wyoming ====
▌1. Frank A. Barrett (R)
▌2. Joseph C. O'Mahoney (D)

Senators' party membership by state at the opening of the 85th Congress in January 1957 2 Democrats 1 Democrat and 1 Republican 2 Republicans

Senate majority leadership

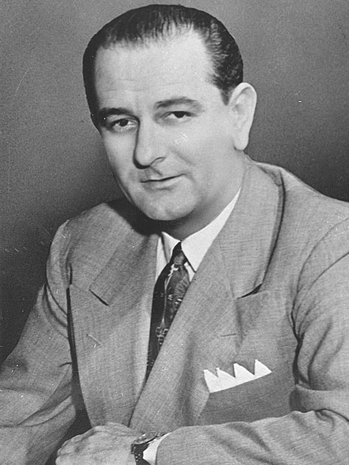
Democratic leader
Lyndon B. Johnson

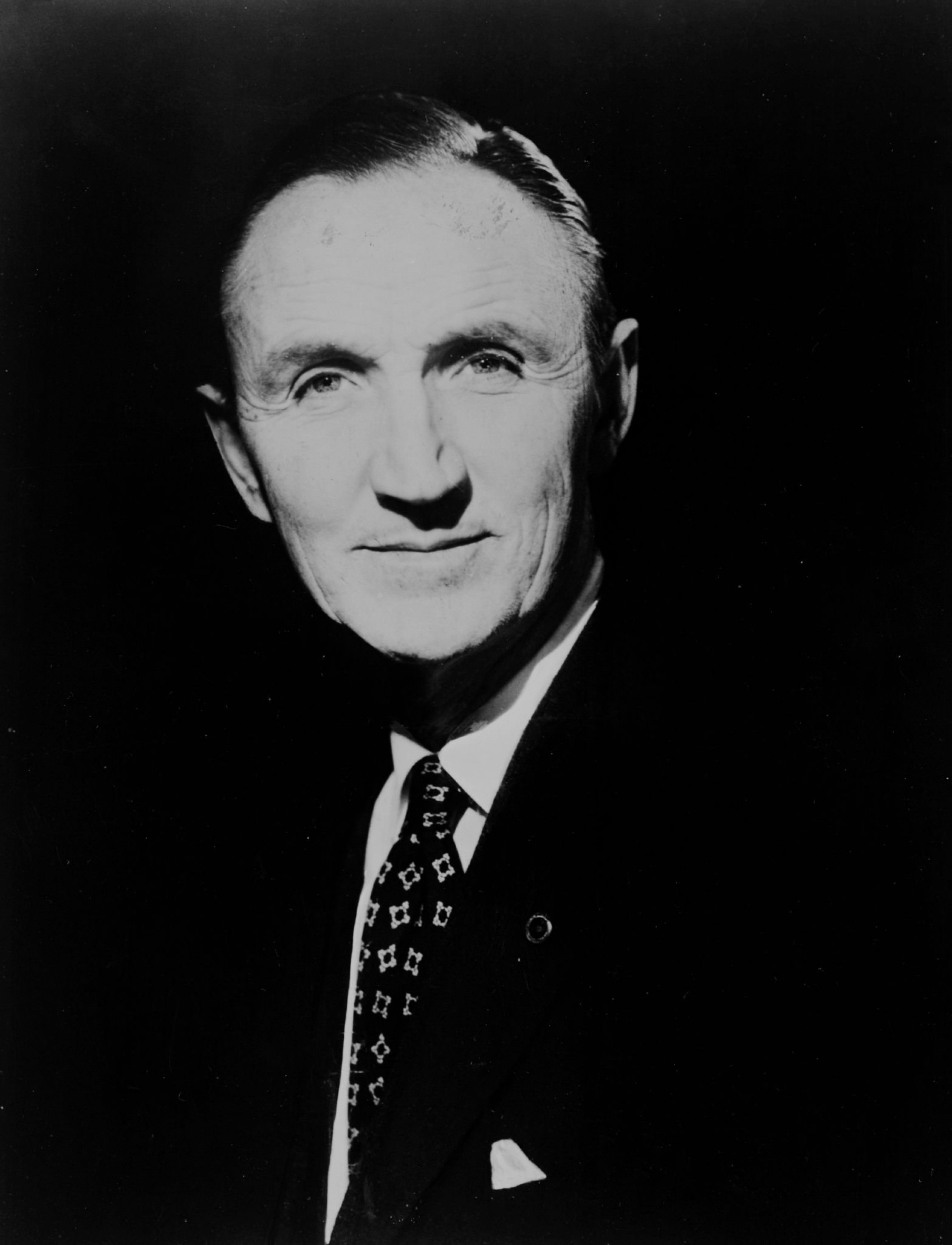
Democratic whip
Mike Mansfield

Senate minority leadership

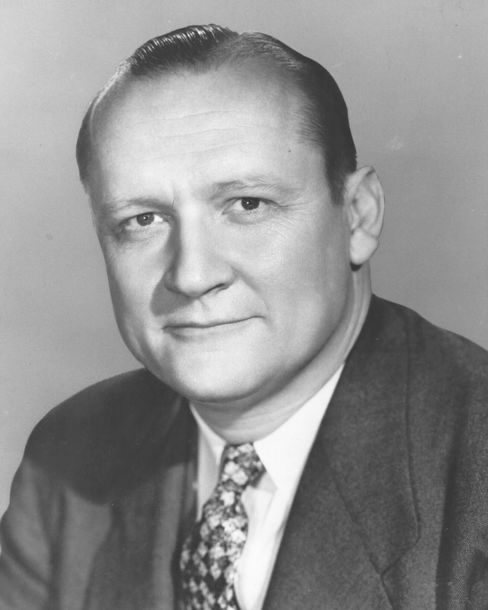
Republican leader
William Knowland

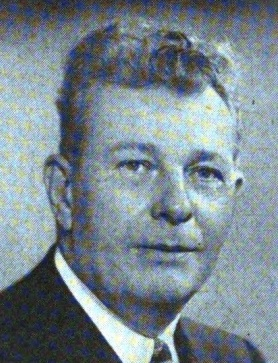
Republican whip
Everett Dirksen

=== House of Representatives ===
==== Alabama ====
▌1. Frank W. Boykin (D)
▌2. George M. Grant (D)
▌3. George W. Andrews (D)
▌4. Kenneth A. Roberts (D)
▌5. Albert Rains (D)
▌6. Armistead I. Selden Jr. (D)
▌7. Carl Elliott (D)
▌8. Robert E. Jones Jr. (D)
▌9. George Huddleston Jr. (D)

==== Arizona ====
▌1. John Jacob Rhodes (R)
▌2. Stewart Udall (D)

==== Arkansas ====
▌1. Ezekiel C. Gathings (D)
▌2. Wilbur Mills (D)
▌3. James William Trimble (D)
▌4. Oren Harris (D)
▌5. Brooks Hays (D)
▌6. William F. Norrell (D)

==== California ====
▌1. Hubert B. Scudder (R)
▌2. Clair Engle (D)
▌3. John E. Moss (D)
▌4. William S. Mailliard (R)
▌5. John F. Shelley (D)
▌6. John F. Baldwin Jr. (R)
▌7. John J. Allen Jr. (R)
▌8. George P. Miller (D)
▌9. J. Arthur Younger (R)
▌10. Charles Gubser (R)
▌11. John J. McFall (D)
▌12. B. F. Sisk (D)
▌13. Charles M. Teague (R)
▌14. Harlan Hagen (D)
▌15. Gordon L. McDonough (R)
▌16. Donald L. Jackson (R)
▌17. Cecil R. King (D)
▌18. Craig Hosmer (R)
▌19. Chester E. Holifield (D)
▌20. H. Allen Smith (R)
▌21. Edgar W. Hiestand (R)
▌22. Joseph F. Holt (R)
▌23. Clyde Doyle (D)
▌24. Glenard P. Lipscomb (R)
▌25. Patrick J. Hillings (R)
▌26. James Roosevelt (D)
▌27. Harry R. Sheppard (D)
▌28. James B. Utt (R)
▌29. Dalip Singh Saund (D)
▌30. Bob Wilson (R)

==== Colorado ====
▌1. Byron G. Rogers (D)
▌2. William S. Hill (R)
▌3. John Chenoweth (R)
▌4. Wayne N. Aspinall (D)

==== Connecticut ====
▌1. Edwin H. May Jr. (R)
▌2. Horace Seely-Brown Jr. (R)
▌3. Albert W. Cretella (R)
▌4. Albert P. Morano (R)
▌5. James T. Patterson (R)
▌At-large. Antoni Sadlak (R)

==== Delaware ====
▌At-large. Harry G. Haskell Jr. (R)

==== Florida ====
▌1. William C. Cramer (R)
▌2. Charles E. Bennett (D)
▌3. Robert L. F. Sikes (D)
▌4. Dante Fascell (D)
▌5. Syd Herlong (D)
▌6. Paul Rogers (D)
▌7. James A. Haley (D)
▌8. Donald Ray Matthews (D)

==== Georgia ====
▌1. Prince Hulon Preston Jr. (D)
▌2. J. L. Pilcher (D)
▌3. Tic Forrester (D)
▌4. John Flynt (D)
▌5. James C. Davis (D)
▌6. Carl Vinson (D)
▌7. Henderson Lovelace Lanham (D), until November 10, 1957

▌ Harlan Erwin Mitchell (D), from January 8, 1958

▌8. Iris Faircloth Blitch (D)
▌9. Phillip M. Landrum (D)
▌10. Paul Brown (D)

==== Idaho ====
▌1. Gracie Pfost (D)
▌2. Hamer H. Budge (R)

==== Illinois ====
▌1. William L. Dawson (D)
▌2. Barratt O'Hara (D)
▌3. Emmet Byrne (R)
▌4. William E. McVey (R), until August 10, 1958
▌5. John C. Kluczynski (D)
▌6. Thomas J. O'Brien (D)
▌7. James Bowler (D), until July 18, 1957

▌Roland V. Libonati (D), from December 31, 1957

▌8. Thomas S. Gordon (D)
▌9. Sidney R. Yates (D)
▌10. Harold R. Collier (R)
▌11. Timothy P. Sheehan (R)
▌12. Charles A. Boyle (D)
▌13. Marguerite S. Church (R)
▌14. Russell W. Keeney (R), until January 11, 1958
▌15. Noah M. Mason (R)
▌16. Leo E. Allen (R)
▌17. Leslie C. Arends (R)
▌18. Robert H. Michel (R)
▌19. Robert B. Chiperfield (R)
▌20. Sid Simpson (R), until October 26, 1958
▌21. Peter F. Mack Jr. (D)
▌22. William L. Springer (R)
▌23. Charles W. Vursell (R)
▌24. Melvin Price (D)
▌25. Kenneth J. Gray (D)

==== Indiana ====
▌1. Ray Madden (D)
▌2. Charles A. Halleck (R)
▌3. F. Jay Nimtz (R)
▌4. E. Ross Adair (R)
▌5. John V. Beamer (R)
▌6. Cecil M. Harden (R)
▌7. William G. Bray (R)
▌8. Winfield K. Denton (D)
▌9. Earl Wilson (R)
▌10. Ralph Harvey (R)
▌11. Charles B. Brownson (R)

==== Iowa ====
▌1. Fred Schwengel (R)
▌2. Henry O. Talle (R)
▌3. H. R. Gross (R)
▌4. Karl M. LeCompte (R)
▌5. Paul Cunningham (R)
▌6. Merwin Coad (D)
▌7. Ben F. Jensen (R)
▌8. Charles B. Hoeven (R)

==== Kansas ====
▌1. William H. Avery (R)
▌2. Errett P. Scrivner (R)
▌3. Myron V. George (R)
▌4. Edward Herbert Rees (R)
▌5. James Floyd Breeding (D)
▌6. Wint Smith (R)

==== Kentucky ====
▌1. Noble J. Gregory (D)
▌2. William Natcher (D)
▌3. John M. Robsion Jr. (R)
▌4. Frank Chelf (D)
▌5. Brent Spence (D)
▌6. John C. Watts (D)
▌7. Carl D. Perkins (D)
▌8. Eugene Siler (R)

==== Louisiana ====
▌1. F. Edward Hébert (D)
▌2. Hale Boggs (D)
▌3. Edwin E. Willis (D)
▌4. Overton Brooks (D)
▌5. Otto Passman (D)
▌6. James H. Morrison (D)
▌7. T. Ashton Thompson (D)
▌8. George S. Long (D), until March 22, 1958

==== Maine ====
▌1. Robert Hale (R)
▌2. Frank M. Coffin (D)
▌3. Clifford McIntire (R)

==== Maryland ====
▌1. Edward Tylor Miller (R)
▌2. James Devereux (R)
▌3. Edward Garmatz (D)
▌4. George Hyde Fallon (D)
▌5. Richard Lankford (D)
▌6. DeWitt Hyde (R)
▌7. Samuel Friedel (D)

==== Massachusetts ====
▌1. John W. Heselton (R)
▌2. Edward Boland (D)
▌3. Philip J. Philbin (D)
▌4. Harold Donohue (D)
▌5. Edith Nourse Rogers (R)
▌6. William H. Bates (R)
▌7. Thomas J. Lane (D)
▌8. Torbert Macdonald (D)
▌9. Donald W. Nicholson (R)
▌10. Laurence Curtis (R)
▌11. Tip O'Neill (D)
▌12. John W. McCormack (D)
▌13. Richard B. Wigglesworth (R), until November 13, 1958
▌14. Joseph W. Martin Jr. (R)

==== Michigan ====
▌1. Thaddeus M. Machrowicz (D)
▌2. George Meader (R)
▌3. August E. Johansen (R)
▌4. Clare E. Hoffman (R)
▌5. Gerald Ford (R)
▌6. Charles E. Chamberlain (R)
▌7. Robert J. McIntosh (R)
▌8. Alvin Morell Bentley (R)
▌9. Robert P. Griffin (R)
▌10. Elford Albin Cederberg (R)
▌11. Victor A. Knox (R)
▌12. John B. Bennett (R)
▌13. Charles Diggs (D)
▌14. Louis C. Rabaut (D)
▌15. John D. Dingell Jr. (D)
▌16. John Lesinski Jr. (D)
▌17. Martha Griffiths (D)
▌18. William Broomfield (R)

==== Minnesota ====
▌1. August H. Andresen (R), until January 14, 1958

▌Al Quie (R), from February 18, 1958

▌2.Joseph P. O'Hara (R)
▌3.Roy Wier (DFL)
▌4.Eugene McCarthy (DFL)
▌5.Walter Judd (R)
▌6.Fred Marshall (DFL)
▌7.Herman Carl Andersen (R)
▌8.John Blatnik (DFL)
▌9.Coya Knutson (DFL)

==== Mississippi ====
▌1. Thomas Abernethy (D)
▌2. Jamie L. Whitten (D)
▌3. Frank Ellis Smith (D)
▌4. John Bell Williams (D)
▌5. W. Arthur Winstead (D)
▌6. William M. Colmer (D)

==== Missouri ====
▌1. Frank M. Karsten (D)
▌2. Thomas B. Curtis (R)
▌3. Leonor Sullivan (D)
▌4. George H. Christopher (D)
▌5. Richard Walker Bolling (D)
▌6. William Raleigh Hull Jr. (D)
▌7. Charles Harrison Brown (D)
▌8. A. S. J. Carnahan (D)
▌9. Clarence Cannon (D)
▌10. Paul C. Jones (D)
▌11. Morgan M. Moulder (D)

==== Montana ====
▌1. Lee Metcalf (D)
▌2. LeRoy H. Anderson (D)

==== Nebraska ====
▌1. Phillip Hart Weaver (R)
▌2. Glenn Cunningham (R)
▌3. Robert Dinsmore Harrison (R)
▌4. Arthur L. Miller (R)

==== Nevada ====
▌At-large. Walter S. Baring Jr. (D)

==== New Hampshire ====
▌1. Chester Earl Merrow (R)
▌2. Perkins Bass (R)

==== New Jersey ====
▌1. Charles A. Wolverton (R)
▌2. Milton W. Glenn (R), from November 5, 1957
▌3. James C. Auchincloss (R)
▌4. Frank Thompson (D)
▌5. Peter Frelinghuysen Jr. (R)
▌6. Florence P. Dwyer (R)
▌7. William B. Widnall (R)
▌8. Gordon Canfield (R)
▌9. Frank C. Osmers Jr. (R)
▌10. Peter W. Rodino (D)
▌11. Hugh Joseph Addonizio (D)
▌12. Robert Kean (R)
▌13. Alfred Dennis Sieminski (D)
▌▌14. Vincent J. Dellay (R) to (D), sometime in 1958

==== New Mexico ====
▌At-large. John J. Dempsey (D), until March 11, 1958
▌At-large. Joseph Montoya (D), from April 9, 1957

==== New York ====
▌1. Stuyvesant Wainwright (R)
▌2. Steven Derounian (R)
▌3. Frank J. Becker (R)
▌4. Henry J. Latham (R), until December 31, 1958
▌5. Albert H. Bosch (R)
▌6. Lester Holtzman (D)
▌7. James J. Delaney (D)
▌8. Victor Anfuso (D)
▌9. Eugene J. Keogh (D)
▌10. Edna F. Kelly (D)
▌11. Emanuel Celler (D)
▌12. Francis E. Dorn (R)
▌13. Abraham J. Multer (D)
▌14. John J. Rooney (D)
▌15. John H. Ray (R)
▌16. Adam Clayton Powell Jr. (D)
▌17. Frederic René Coudert Jr. (R)
▌18. Alfred E. Santangelo (D)
▌19. Leonard Farbstein (D)
▌20. Ludwig Teller (D)
▌21. Herbert Zelenko (D)
▌22. James C. Healey (D)
▌23. Isidore Dollinger (D)
▌24. Charles A. Buckley (D)
▌25. Paul A. Fino (R)
▌26. Edwin B. Dooley (R)
▌27. Ralph W. Gwinn (R)
▌28. Katharine St. George (R)
▌29. J. Ernest Wharton (R)
▌30. Leo W. O'Brien (D)
▌31. Dean P. Taylor (R)
▌32. Bernard W. Kearney (R)
▌33. Clarence E. Kilburn (R)
▌34. William R. Williams (R)
▌35. R. Walter Riehlman (R)
▌36. John Taber (R)
▌37. W. Sterling Cole (R), until December 1, 1957

▌Howard W. Robison (R), from January 14, 1958

▌38. Kenneth Keating (R)
▌39. Harold C. Ostertag (R)
▌40. William E. Miller (R)
▌41. Edmund P. Radwan (R)
▌42. John R. Pillion (R)
▌43. Daniel A. Reed (R)

==== North Carolina ====
▌1. Herbert Covington Bonner (D)
▌2. Lawrence H. Fountain (D)
▌3. Graham A. Barden (D)
▌4. Harold D. Cooley (D)
▌5. Ralph James Scott (D)
▌6. Carl T. Durham (D)
▌7. Alton Lennon (D)
▌8. Alvin Paul Kitchin (D)
▌9. Hugh Quincy Alexander (D)
▌10. Charles R. Jonas (R)
▌11. Basil Lee Whitener (D)
▌12. George A. Shuford (D)

==== North Dakota ====
▌At-large. Otto Krueger (R)
▌At-large. Usher L. Burdick (R-NPL)

==== Ohio ====
▌1. Gordon H. Scherer (R)
▌2. William E. Hess (R)
▌3. Paul F. Schenck (R)
▌4. William Moore McCulloch (R)
▌5. Cliff Clevenger (R)
▌6. James G. Polk (D)
▌7. Clarence J. Brown (R)
▌8. Jackson Edward Betts (R)
▌9. Thomas L. Ashley (D)
▌10. Thomas A. Jenkins (R)
▌11. David S. Dennison (R)
▌12. John M. Vorys (R)
▌13. Albert David Baumhart Jr. (R)
▌14. William Hanes Ayres (R)
▌15. John E. Henderson (R)
▌16. Frank T. Bow (R)
▌17. J. Harry McGregor (R), until October 7, 1958; vacant thereafter
▌18. Wayne Hays (D)
▌19. Michael J. Kirwan (D)
▌20. Michael A. Feighan (D)
▌21. Charles Vanik (D)
▌22. Frances P. Bolton (R)
▌23. William Edwin Minshall Jr. (R)

==== Oklahoma ====
▌1. Page Belcher (R)
▌2. Ed Edmondson (D)
▌3. Carl Albert (D)
▌4. Tom Steed (D)
▌5. John Jarman (D)
▌6. Toby Morris (D)

==== Oregon ====
▌1. A. Walter Norblad (R)
▌2. Al Ullman (D)
▌3. Edith Green (D)
▌4. Charles O. Porter (D)

==== Pennsylvania ====
▌1. William A. Barrett (D)
▌2. Kathryn E. Granahan (D)
▌3. James A. Byrne (D)
▌4. Earl Chudoff (D), until January 5, 1958

▌Robert N. C. Nix Sr. (D), from May 20, 1958

▌5. William J. Green Jr. (D)
▌6. Hugh Scott (R)
▌7. Benjamin F. James (R)
▌8. Willard S. Curtin (R)
▌9. Paul B. Dague (R)
▌10. Joseph L. Carrigg (R)
▌11. Dan Flood (D)
▌12. Ivor D. Fenton (R)
▌13. Samuel K. McConnell Jr. (R), until September 1, 1957

▌John A. Lafore Jr. (R), from November 5, 1957

▌14. George M. Rhodes (D)
▌15. Francis E. Walter (D)
▌16. Walter M. Mumma (R)
▌17. Alvin Bush (R)
▌18. Richard M. Simpson (R)
▌19. S. Walter Stauffer (R)
▌20. James E. Van Zandt (R)
▌21. Augustine B. Kelley (D), until November 20, 1957

▌John Herman Dent (D), from January 21, 1958

▌22. John P. Saylor (R)
▌23. Leon H. Gavin (R)
▌24. Carroll D. Kearns (R)
▌25. Frank M. Clark (D)
▌26. Thomas E. Morgan (D)
▌27. James G. Fulton (R)
▌28. Herman P. Eberharter (D), until September 9, 1958
▌29. Robert J. Corbett (R)
▌30. Elmer J. Holland (D)

==== Rhode Island ====
▌1. Aime Forand (D)
▌2. John E. Fogarty (D)

==== South Carolina ====
▌1. L. Mendel Rivers (D)
▌2. John J. Riley (D)
▌3. William Jennings Bryan Dorn (D)
▌4. Robert T. Ashmore (D)
▌5. Robert W. Hemphill (D)
▌6. John L. McMillan (D)

==== South Dakota ====
▌1. George McGovern (D)
▌2. Ellis Yarnal Berry (R)

==== Tennessee ====
▌1. B. Carroll Reece (R)
▌2. Howard Baker Sr. (R)
▌3. James B. Frazier Jr. (D)
▌4. Joe L. Evins (D)
▌5. Joseph Carlton Loser (D)
▌6. Ross Bass (D)
▌7. Tom J. Murray (D)
▌8. Jere Cooper (D), until December 18, 1957

▌Fats Everett (D), from February 1, 1958

▌9. Clifford Davis (D)

==== Texas ====
▌1. Wright Patman (D)
▌2. Jack Brooks (D)
▌3. Lindley Beckworth (D)
▌4. Sam Rayburn (D)
▌5. Bruce Alger (R)
▌6. Olin E. Teague (D)
▌7. John Dowdy (D)
▌8. Albert Thomas (D)
▌9. Clark W. Thompson (D)
▌10. Homer Thornberry (D)
▌11. William R. Poage (D)
▌12. Jim Wright (D)
▌13. Frank N. Ikard (D)
▌14. John Andrew Young (D)
▌15. Joe M. Kilgore (D)
▌16. J. T. Rutherford (D)
▌17. Omar Burleson (D)
▌18. Walter E. Rogers (D)
▌19. George H. Mahon (D)
▌20. Paul J. Kilday (D)
▌21. O. C. Fisher (D)
▌At-large. Martin Dies Jr. (D)

==== Utah ====
▌1. Henry Aldous Dixon (R)
▌2. William A. Dawson (R)

==== Vermont ====
▌At-large. Winston L. Prouty (R)

==== Virginia ====
▌1. Edward J. Robeson Jr. (D)
▌2. Porter Hardy Jr. (D)
▌3. J. Vaughan Gary (D)
▌4. Watkins Moorman Abbitt (D)
▌5. William M. Tuck (D)
▌6. Richard Harding Poff (R)
▌7. Burr Harrison (D)
▌8. Howard W. Smith (D)
▌9. W. Pat Jennings (D)
▌10. Joel Broyhill (R)

==== Washington ====
▌1. Thomas Pelly (R)
▌2. Jack Westland (R)
▌3. Russell V. Mack (R)
▌4. Hal Holmes (R)
▌5. Walt Horan (R)
▌6. Thor C. Tollefson (R)
▌At-large. Donald H. Magnuson (D)

==== West Virginia ====
▌1. Arch A. Moore Jr. (R)
▌2. Harley Orrin Staggers (D)
▌3. Cleveland M. Bailey (D)
▌4. Will E. Neal (R)
▌5. Elizabeth Kee (D)
▌6. Robert Byrd (D)

==== Wisconsin ====
▌1. Lawrence H. Smith (R), until January 22, 1958
▌2. Donald Edgar Tewes (R)
▌3. Gardner R. Withrow (R)
▌4. Clement J. Zablocki (D)
▌5. Henry S. Reuss (D)
▌6. William Van Pelt (R)
▌7. Melvin Laird (R)
▌8. John W. Byrnes (R)
▌9. Lester Johnson (D)
▌10. Alvin O'Konski (R)

==== Wyoming ====
▌At-large. Edwin Keith Thomson (R)

==== Non-voting members ====
▌Alaska Territory. Bob Bartlett (D)
▌Hawaii Territory. John A. Burns (D)
▌Puerto Rico. Antonio Fernós-Isern (PPD)

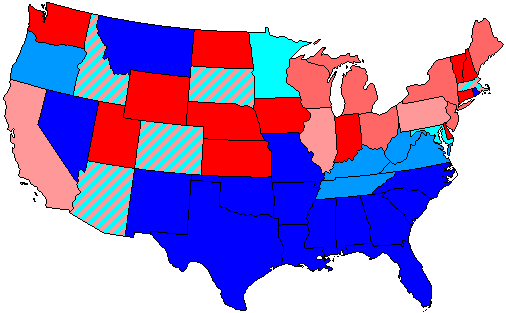
House seats by party holding plurality in state: 80+% Democratic / 80+% Republican; 60+% to 80% Democratic / 60+% to 80% Republican; Up to 60% Democratic / Up to 60% Republican

== Changes in membership ==
=== Senate ===
Senate changes
State (class)	Vacated by	Reason for change	Successor	Date of successor's formal installation (Note: When seated or oath administered, not necessarily when service began.)
New York (3)	Vacant	Senator-elect chose to take seat late to prevent Governor from appointing a rival to be his successor as New York Attorney General.	Jacob Javits (R)	January 9, 1957
Texas (1)	Price Daniel (D)	Resigned January 14, 1957, after being elected Governor of Texas. Successor appointed January 15, 1957.	William A. Blakley (D)	January 15, 1957
Texas (1)	William A. Blakley (D)	Interim appointee retired when successor elected. Successor elected April 28, 1957.	Ralph Yarborough (D)	April 29, 1957
Wisconsin (1)	Joseph McCarthy (R)	Died May 2, 1957. Successor elected August 27, 1957.	William Proxmire (D)	August 28, 1957
West Virginia (2)	Matthew M. Neely (D)	Died January 18, 1958. Successor appointed January 25, 1958.	John D. Hoblitzell Jr. (R)	January 25, 1958
North Carolina (2)	W. Kerr Scott (D)	Died April 16, 1958. Successor appointed April 19, 1958, and then elected November 4, 1958.	B. Everett Jordan (D)	April 19, 1958
West Virginia (2)	John D. Hoblitzell Jr. (R)	Interim appointee lost special election. Successor elected November 4, 1958.	Jennings Randolph (D)	November 5, 1958
California (1)	William F. Knowland (R)	Resigned early January 2, 1959.	Vacant	Not filled this term

=== House of Representatives ===
House changes
District	Vacated by	Reason for change	Successor	Date of successor's formal installation
New Mexico at-large	Vacant	Rep. Antonio M. Fernández died during previous congress.	Joseph Montoya (D)	April 9, 1957
New Jersey 2	Vacant	Rep. T. Millet Hand died during previous congress.	Milton W. Glenn (R)	November 5, 1957
Illinois 7	James Bowler (D)	Died July 18, 1957.	Roland V. Libonati (D)	December 31, 1957
Pennsylvania 13	Samuel K. McConnell Jr. (R)	Resigned September 1, 1957, after becoming Executive Director of the United Cerebral Palsy Associations	John A. Lafore Jr. (R)	November 5, 1957
Georgia 7	Henderson L. Lanham (D)	Died November 10, 1957.	Harlan E. Mitchell (D)	January 8, 1958
Pennsylvania 21	Augustine B. Kelley (D)	Died November 20, 1957.	John H. Dent (D)	January 21, 1958
New York 37	W. Sterling Cole (R)	Resigned December 1, 1957, after becoming Director General of the International Atomic Energy Agency.	Howard W. Robison (R)	January 14, 1958
Tennessee 8	Jere Cooper (D)	Died December 18, 1957.	Fats Everett (D)	February 1, 1958
Pennsylvania 4	Earl Chudoff (D)	Resigned January 5, 1958, after being elected judge of the Philadelphia Court of Common Pleas No. 1.	Robert N.C. Nix Sr. (D)	May 20, 1958
New Jersey 14	Vincent J. Dellay (R)	Changed political affiliation some time in 1958.	Vincent J. Dellay (D)	????, 1958
Illinois 14	Russell W. Keeney (R)	Died January 11, 1958.	Vacant	Not filled this term.
Minnesota 1	August H. Andresen (R)	Died January 14, 1958.	Al Quie (R)	February 18, 1958
Wisconsin 1	Lawrence H. Smith (R)	Died January 22, 1958.	Not filled this term.	
New Mexico at-large	John J. Dempsey (D)	Died March 11, 1958.	Not filled this term.	
Louisiana 8	George S. Long (D)	Died March 22, 1958.	Not filled this term.	
Illinois 4	William E. McVey (R)	Died August 10, 1958.	Not filled this term.	
Pennsylvania 28	Herman P. Eberharter (D)	Died September 9, 1958.	Not filled this term.	
Ohio 17	J. Harry McGregor (R)	Died October 7, 1958.	Not filled this term.	
Illinois 20	Sid Simpson (R)	Died October 26, 1958.	Not filled this term.	
Massachusetts 13	Richard B. Wigglesworth (R)	Resigned November 13, 1958.	Not filled this term.	
New York 4	Henry J. Latham (R)	Resigned December 31, 1958, after becoming a judge of the New York Supreme Court.	Not filled this term.	

== Committees ==
Lists of committees and their party leaders for members of the House and Senate committees can be found through the Official Congressional Directory at the bottom of this article. The directory after the pages of terms of service lists committees of the Senate, House (Standing with Subcommittees, Select and Special) and Joint and, after that, House/Senate committee assignments. On the committees section of the House and Senate in the Official Congressional Directory, the committee's members on the first row on the left side shows the chairman of the committee and on the right side shows the ranking member of the committee.

=== Senate ===
- Agriculture and Forestry (Chairman: Allen J. Ellender; Ranking Member: George D. Aiken)
- Appropriations (Chairman: Carl Hayden; Ranking Member: Styles Bridges)
- Armed Services (Chairman: Richard B. Russell; Ranking Member: Leverett Saltonstall)
- Banking and Currency (Chairman: J. William Fulbright; Ranking Member: Homer Capehart)
- District of Columbia (Chairman: Matthew M. Neely; Ranking Member: J. Glenn Beall)
- Finance (Chairman: Harry F. Byrd; Ranking Member: Edward Martin)
- Foreign Relations (Chairman: Theodore F. Green; Ranking Member: Alexander Wiley)
- Foreign Aid Program (Special) (Chairman: [data missing]; Ranking Member: [data missing])
- Government Operations (Chairman: John Little McClellan; Ranking Member: Joseph McCarthy then Karl E. Mundt)
- Interior and Insular Affairs (Chairman: James E. Murray; Ranking Member: George W. Malone)
- Interstate and Foreign Commerce (Chairman: Warren G. Magnuson; Ranking Member: John W. Bricker)
- Judiciary (Chairman: James O. Eastland; Ranking Member: Alexander Wiley)
- Labor and Public Welfare (Chairman: J. Lister Hill; Ranking Member: H. Alexander Smith)
- Labor-Management Relations (Select)
- Political Activities, Lobbying and Campaign Contributions (Special)
- Post Office and Civil Service (Chairman: Olin D. Johnston; Ranking Member: Frank Carlson)
- Preserve Historical Records of the Senate (Special)
- Public Works (Chairman: Dennis Chavez; Ranking Member: Edward Martin)
- Rules and Administration (Chairman: Thomas C. Hennings Jr.; Ranking Member: Carl T. Curtis)
- Senate Reception Room (Special)
- Small Business (Select) (Chairman: John J. Sparkman)
- Space and Aeronautics (Special)
- Subcommittee on Internal Security
- Whole

=== House of Representatives ===
- Agriculture (Chairman: Harold D. Cooley; Ranking Member: August H. Andresen then William S. Hill)
- Appropriations (Chairman: Clarence Cannon; Ranking Member: John Taber)
- Armed Services (Chairman: Carl Vinson; Ranking Member: Leslie C. Arends)
- Banking and Currency (Chairman: Brent Spence; Ranking Member: Henry O. Talle)
- Benefits for Dependents of Armed Services Veterans (Select)
- Defense Production
- District of Columbia (Chairman: John L. McMillan; Ranking Member: Sid Simpson then Joseph P. O'Hara)
- Education and Labor (Chairman: Graham A. Barden; Ranking Member: Samuel K. McConnell then Ralph W. Gwinn)
- Foreign Affairs (Chairman: Thomas S. Gordon; Ranking Member: Robert B. Chiperfield)
- Government Operations (Chairman: William L. Dawson; Ranking Member: Clare E. Hoffman)
- House Administration (Chairman: Omar Burleson; Ranking Member: Karl M. LeCompte)
- Interior and Insular Affairs (Chairman: Clair Engle; Ranking Member: A.L. Miller)
- Interstate and Foreign Commerce (Chairman: Oren Harris; Ranking Member: Charles A. Wolverton)
- Judiciary (Chairman: Emanuel Celler; Ranking Member: Kenneth B. Keating)
- Merchant Marine and Fisheries (Chairman: Oren Harris; Ranking Member: Thor C. Tollefson)
- Post Office and Civil Service (Chairman: Tom J. Murray; Ranking Member: Edward H. Rees)
- Public Works (Chairman: Charles A. Buckley; Ranking Member: J. Harry McGregor then James C. Auchincloss)
- Rules (Chairman: Howard W. Smith; Ranking Member: Leo E. Allen)
- Small Business (Select) (Chairman: Wright Patman)
- Un-American Activities (Chairman: Francis E. Walter; Ranking Member: Bernard W. Kearney)
- Veterans' Affairs (Chairman: Olin D. Johnston; Ranking Member: Edith Nourse Rogers)
- Ways and Means (Chairman: Jere Cooper; Ranking Member: Daniel A. Reed)
- Whole

=== Joint committees ===
- Atomic Energy (Chairman: Rep. Carl T. Durham; Vice Chairman: Sen. Clinton P. Anderson)
- Conditions of Indian Tribes (Special)
- Construction of a Building for a Museum of History and Technology for the Smithsonian
- Defense Production (Chairman: Sen. A. Willis Robertson; Vice Chairman: Rep. Paul Brown)
- Disposition of Executive Papers
- Economic (Chairman: Rep. Wright Patman; Vice Chairman: Sen. John J. Sparkman)
- Immigration and Nationality Policy (Chairman: Vacant; Vice Chairman: Vacant)
- Legislative Budget
- The Library (Chairman: Rep. Omar Burleson; Vice Chairman: Sen. Theodore F. Green)
- Navajo-Hopi Indian Administration
- Printing (Chairman: Sen. Carl Hayden; Vice Chairman: Rep. Omar Burleson)
- Reduction of Nonessential Federal Expenditures (Chairman: Sen. Harry F. Byrd; Vice Chairman: Rep. Clarence Cannon)
- Taxation (Chairman: Rep. Jere Cooper; Vice Chairman: Sen. Harry F. Byrd)
- Washington (DC) Metropolitan Problems

== Employees ==
=== Legislative branch agency directors ===
- Architect of the Capitol: J. George Stewart
- Attending Physician of the United States Congress: George Calver
- Comptroller General of the United States: Joseph Campbell
- Librarian of Congress: Lawrence Quincy Mumford
- Public Printer of the United States: Raymond Blattenberger

=== Senate ===
- Chaplain: Frederick Brown Harris, Methodist
- Parliamentarian: Charles Watkins
- Secretary: Felton McLellan Johnston
- Librarian: Richard D. Hupman
- Secretary for the Majority: Robert G. Baker
- Secretary for the Minority: J. Mark Trice
- Sergeant at Arms: Joseph C. Duke

=== House of Representatives ===
- Clerk: Ralph R. Roberts
- Doorkeeper: William Mosley "Fishbait" Miller
- Parliamentarian: Lewis Deschler
- Postmaster: H. H. Morris
- Reading Clerks: George J. Maurer (D) and Alney E. Chaffee (R) (until 1957) then Joe Bartlett (R) (starting 1957)
- Sergeant at Arms: Zeake W. Johnson Jr.
- Chaplain: Bernard Braskamp (Presbyterian)

== See also ==
- 1956 United States elections (elections leading to this Congress)
  - 1956 United States presidential election
  - 1956 United States Senate elections
  - 1956 United States House of Representatives elections
- 1958 United States elections (elections during this Congress, leading to the next Congress)
  - 1958 United States Senate elections
  - 1958 United States House of Representatives elections
