= Joseph Franklin Biddle =

American politician (1871–1936)

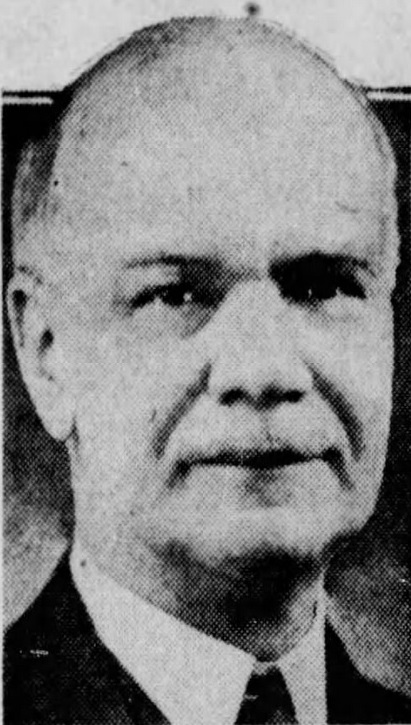
- Philadelphia Inquirer, September 18, 1932

Member of the U.S. House of Representatives from Pennsylvania's 18th district
- In office November 8, 1932 – March 3, 1933
- Preceded by: Edward M. Beers
- Succeeded by: Benjamin K. Focht

Personal details
- Born: September 14, 1871 Charlesville, Pennsylvania, U.S.
- Died: December 3, 1936 (aged 65) Huntingdon, Pennsylvania
- Party: Republican

Joseph Franklin Biddle (September 14, 1871 – December 3, 1936) was a Republican member of the U.S. House of Representatives from Pennsylvania.

== Career ==
Joseph F. Biddle was born in Charlesville, Pennsylvania. He graduated from Millersville State Teachers’ College at Millersville, Pennsylvania, in 1894 and from the law department of Dickinson College in Carlisle, Pennsylvania, in 1897. He was admitted to the bar and commenced practice in Bedford. He moved to Everett, Pennsylvania, in 1903 and engaged in the practice of law and in newspaper publishing. He moved to Huntingdon, Pennsylvania, in 1918 and engaged in the printing and publishing business and in banking. He was a member of the Pennsylvania Publishers’ Association from 1924 to 1936, director of the National Editorial Association from 1926 to 1936, and a member of the Republican State committee from 1932 to 1936.

In November 1932, Biddle was the successful Republican nominee in the special election held to fill the vacancy in the Seventy-second Congress caused by the death of Edward M. Beers. He completed Beers's term, November 8, 1932 to March 3, 1933, but was not a candidate for a full term.

After leaving Congress, Biddle resumed the printing and newspaper publishing business in Huntingdon, where he died. His interment is in Trinity Churchyard, Friends’ Cove, near Bedford.

== Family publishing business ==
Joseph F. Biddle married Anna Patton Hunter (1876–1936) on June 17, 1903. They had four daughters and one son.

Biddle founded a newspaper, The Daily News of Huntingdon, Pennsylvania, January 31, 1922. Upon the deaths of Joseph F. Biddle and wife, Anna Biddle (both died in 1936), ownership of the Biddle publishing assets passed to their five children:

1. Mary Elisabeth Biddle (1904–1983), married to Wilbur Kaylor McKee (1898–1984)
2. John Hunter Biddle (1905–1977), married to Helen Isabella Read (1913–1985)
3. Anne Patton Biddle (1907–1976), married to Griffith Roberts Pullinger (1903–1984)
4. Sarah Jane Biddle (1908–1979), married to William Worley Ten Eyck (1907–1976)
5. Frances Josephine Biddle (1914–2007), married to Elmer Ellsworth McMeen (1912–1996)

The newspaper and its holding company – The Joseph F. Biddle Publishing Company – was owned and operated by Joseph and Anna Biddle's heirs until October 21, 1991, when all publishing assets were sold to The Sample News Group, LLC.

The Huntingdon Broadcasters, Inc., longtime owners of WHUN (AM) and WHUN (FM), had been a wholly owned subsidiary of The Joseph F. Biddle Publishing Company until the mid-1990s, when it was acquired by Forever Broadcasting (Forever Media, Inc.), and in 2015 was acquired by Southern Belle LLC.

John Hunter Biddle served as publisher of The Daily News from 1936 until his death on May 14, 1977. On June 13, 1977, one of John H. Biddle's sons, Joseph Franklin Biddle II (born 1936) became the publisher of The Daily News – a third generation Biddle family distinction.

== Notable heirs ==
One of Joseph's grandsons, El McMeen (né Elmer Ellsworth McMeen; born 1947) is a notable steel string fingerstyle guitarist.

U.S. House of Representatives
Preceded by Edward M. Beers	Member of the U.S. House of Representatives from Pennsylvania's 18th congressional district 1932–1933	Succeeded by Benjamin K. Focht
