= Benjamin K. Focht =

American politician (1863–1937)

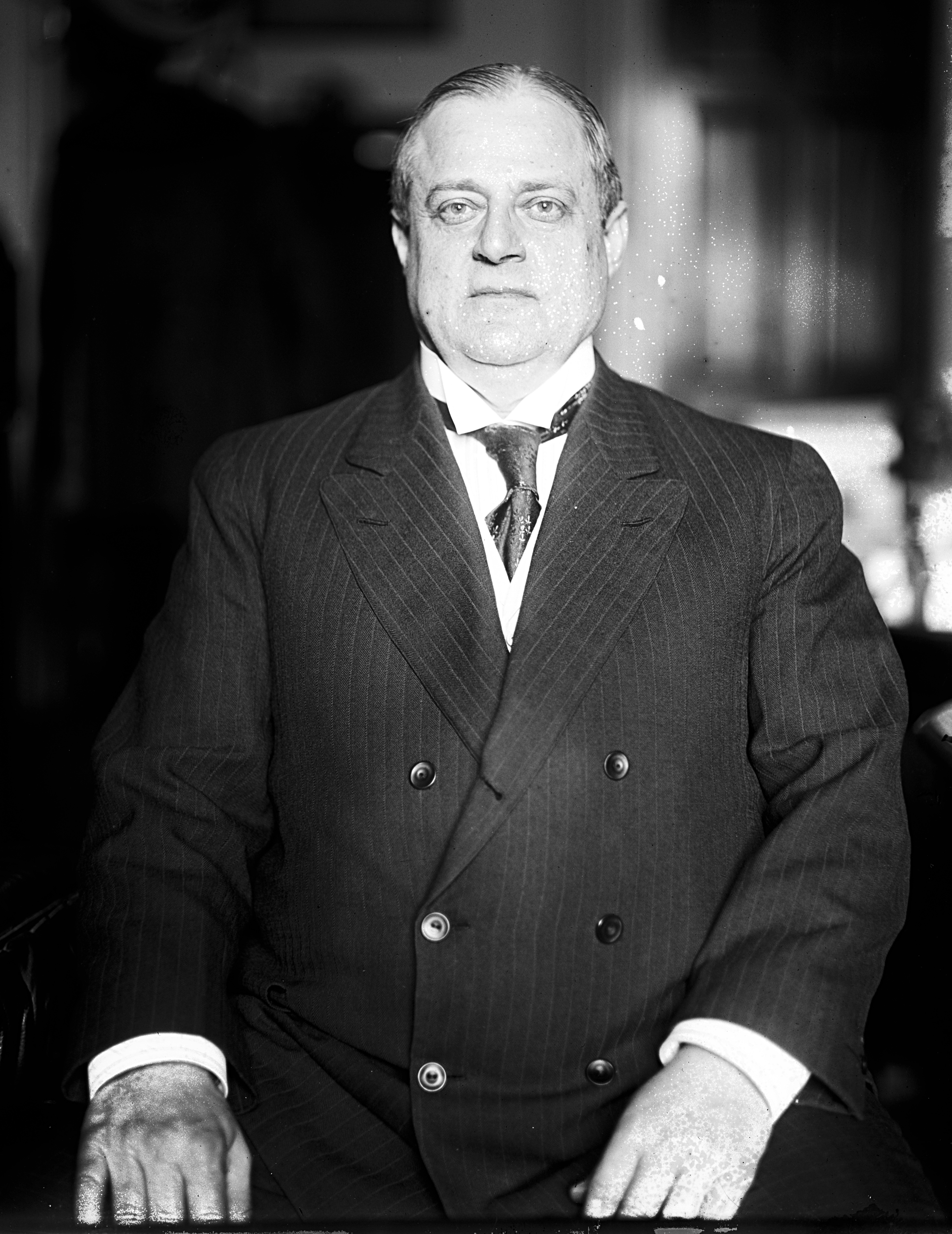
- Focht, 1921–1922

Member of the U.S. House of Representatives from Pennsylvania
- In office March 4, 1933 – March 27, 1937
- Preceded by: Joseph Franklin Biddle
- Succeeded by: Richard M. Simpson
- Constituency: 18th district
- In office March 4, 1915 – March 3, 1923
- Preceded by: Franklin Lewis Dershem
- Succeeded by: Herbert Wesley Cummings
- Constituency: 17th district
- In office March 4, 1907 – March 3, 1913
- Preceded by: Thaddeus Maclay Mahon
- Succeeded by: Franklin Lewis Dershem
- Constituency: 17th district

Member of the Pennsylvania House of Representatives
- In office 1893–1897

Member of the Pennsylvania Senate
- In office 1901–1905

Personal details
- Born: March 12, 1863 New Bloomfield, Pennsylvania
- Died: March 27, 1937 (aged 74) Washington, D.C.
- Party: Republican
- Education: Susquehanna University

Benjamin Kurtz Focht (March 12, 1863 – March 27, 1937) was a Republican member of the U.S. House of Representatives from Pennsylvania.

== Biography ==
Benjamin K. Focht was born in New Bloomfield, Pennsylvania. He attended Bucknell University in Lewisburg, Pennsylvania, Pennsylvania State College at State College, Pennsylvania, and Susquehanna University in Selinsgrove, Pennsylvania. He established the Lewisburg Saturday News in 1881, serving as editor and publisher until his death. He was a delegate to the Republican State Convention in 1889. He served as an officer of the Pennsylvania National Guard. He was a member of the Pennsylvania House of Representatives from 1893 to 1897, and a member of the Pennsylvania State Senate from 1901 to 1905. He was water supply commissioner of Pennsylvania from 1912 to 1914.

Focht was elected as a Republican to the Sixtieth, Sixty-first, and Sixty-second Congresses. He was unsuccessful candidate for reelection in 1912. He was again elected to the Sixty-fourth and to the three succeeding Congresses. He served as Chairman of the United States House Committee on War Claims during the Sixty-sixth Congress, and the United States House Committee on the District of Columbia during the Sixty-seventh Congress. He was an unsuccessful candidate for renomination in 1922, 1924, 1926, 1928, and 1930, and also in 1932 for the unexpired term of Edward M. Beers. After his time in Congress he resumed business activities in Lewisburg. He served as deputy secretary of the Commonwealth in 1928 and 1929. Focht was again elected to the Seventy-third, Seventy-fourth, and Seventy-fifth Congresses and served until his death in Washington, D.C.

== See also ==
- List of members of the United States Congress who died in office (1900–1949)

== Sources ==
- United States Congress. "Benjamin K. Focht (id: F000230)". Biographical Directory of the United States Congress.
- The Political Graveyard

U.S. House of Representatives
Preceded by Thaddeus M. Mahon	Member of the U.S. House of Representatives from Pennsylvania's 17th congressional district 1907–1913	Succeeded by Franklin L. Dershem
Preceded by Franklin L. Dershem	Member of the U.S. House of Representatives from Pennsylvania's 17th congressional district 1915–1923	Succeeded by Herbert W. Cummings
Preceded by Joseph F. Biddle	Member of the U.S. House of Representatives from Pennsylvania's 18th congressional district 1933–1937	Succeeded by Richard M. Simpson
