= H. Mitchell =

H. Mitchell may refer to:

- Harlan Erwin Mitchell (1924–2011), U.S. Representative from Georgia
- H. Mitchell (Hampshire cricketer), English cricketer
