= Nossville, Pennsylvania =

Unincorporated community in Pennsylvania, US

- Unincorporated community
- Location within Pennsylvania
- Coordinates: 40°14′01″N 77°45′56″W
- Country: United States
- State: Pennsylvania
- County: Huntingdon
- Township: Tell
- Elevation: 860 ft (262 m)
- Time zone: UTC-5 (Eastern (EST))
  - Summer (DST): UTC-4 (EDT)
- ZIP code: 17213
- Area code: 814
- GNIS feature ID: 1182694

Nossville is an unincorporated area in Tell Township, Huntingdon County, Pennsylvania. It is located on the banks of Tuscarora Creek, a tributary of the Juniata River.

== History ==
The settlement was named after Colonel George Noss (1813-1892), who built a steam tannery there in 1848. The tannery burned down in 1870, was rebuilt under new ownership, and closed in 1878, but was reopened in 1881 by Oswill Mosser (1854-1896).

Noss was also involved in an attempt to build a railroad in the area, initially called The Duncannon, Landisburg, and Broad Top Railroad Company; incorporated in 1854, it never built track and the charter became dormant in 1879.

Nossville had a post office from 1867 to 1912. There is a Methodist Episcopal church, built in 1872, and an adjoining cemetery.

== Notable residents ==
- Edward M. Beers (1877–1932), U.S. Representative
- Elizabeth Cisney Smith (1881–1965), physician
