= Marlin E. Olmsted =

American politician

Marlin Edgar Olmsted
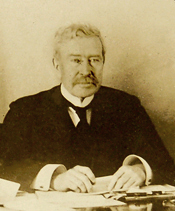

Member of the U.S. House of Representatives from Pennsylvania
- In office March 4, 1897 – March 3, 1913
- Preceded by: Thaddeus M. Mahon
- Succeeded by: Aaron S. Kreider

Personal details
- Born: May 21, 1847 Ulysses Township, Pennsylvania, U.S.
- Died: July 19, 1913 (aged 66) New York City, U.S.
- Resting place: Harrisburg Cemetery
- Party: Republican
- Spouse: Gertrude Howard (m. 1899)
- Education: Coudersport Academy

Marlin Edgar Olmsted (May 21, 1847 – July 19, 1913) was a Republican member of the U.S. House of Representatives from Pennsylvania in the 18th district.

== Biography ==
Marlin E. Olmsted was born in Ulysses Township, Pennsylvania on May 21, 1847. He attended the common schools and Coudersport Academy. He was the assistant corporation clerk and promoted to corporation clerk in charge of collection of corporate taxes under Pennsylvania's revenue system. He studied law, was admitted to the bar in 1878, and commenced practice in Harrisburg, Pennsylvania. He was elected to represent Dauphin County, Pennsylvania, in the proposed constitutional convention in 1891.

He married Gertrude Howard on October 26, 1899.

Olmsted was elected as a Republican to the Fifty-fifth and to the seven succeeding Congresses. He served as Chairman of the United States House Committee on Elections No. 2, during the Fifty-seventh through Sixtieth Congresses, and the United States House Committee on Insular Affairs, during the Sixty-first Congress. He was one of the managers appointed by the United States House of Representatives in 1905 to conduct the impeachment proceedings against Charles Swayne, judge of the United States District Court for the Northern District of Florida. He was not a candidate for renomination in 1912. He resumed the practice of his profession in Harrisburg. He died at Manhattan Eye, Ear and Throat Hospital on July 19, 1913, and was buried at Harrisburg Cemetery.

U.S. House of Representatives
Preceded by Ephraim M. Woomer	Member of the U.S. House of Representatives from Pennsylvania's 14th congressional district 1897–1903	Succeeded by Charles F. Wright
Preceded by Thaddeus M. Mahon	Member of the U.S. House of Representatives from Pennsylvania's 18th congressional district 1903–1913	Succeeded by Aaron S. Kreider
