= Herbert W. Cummings =

American politician (1873–1956)

Herbert Wesley Cummings
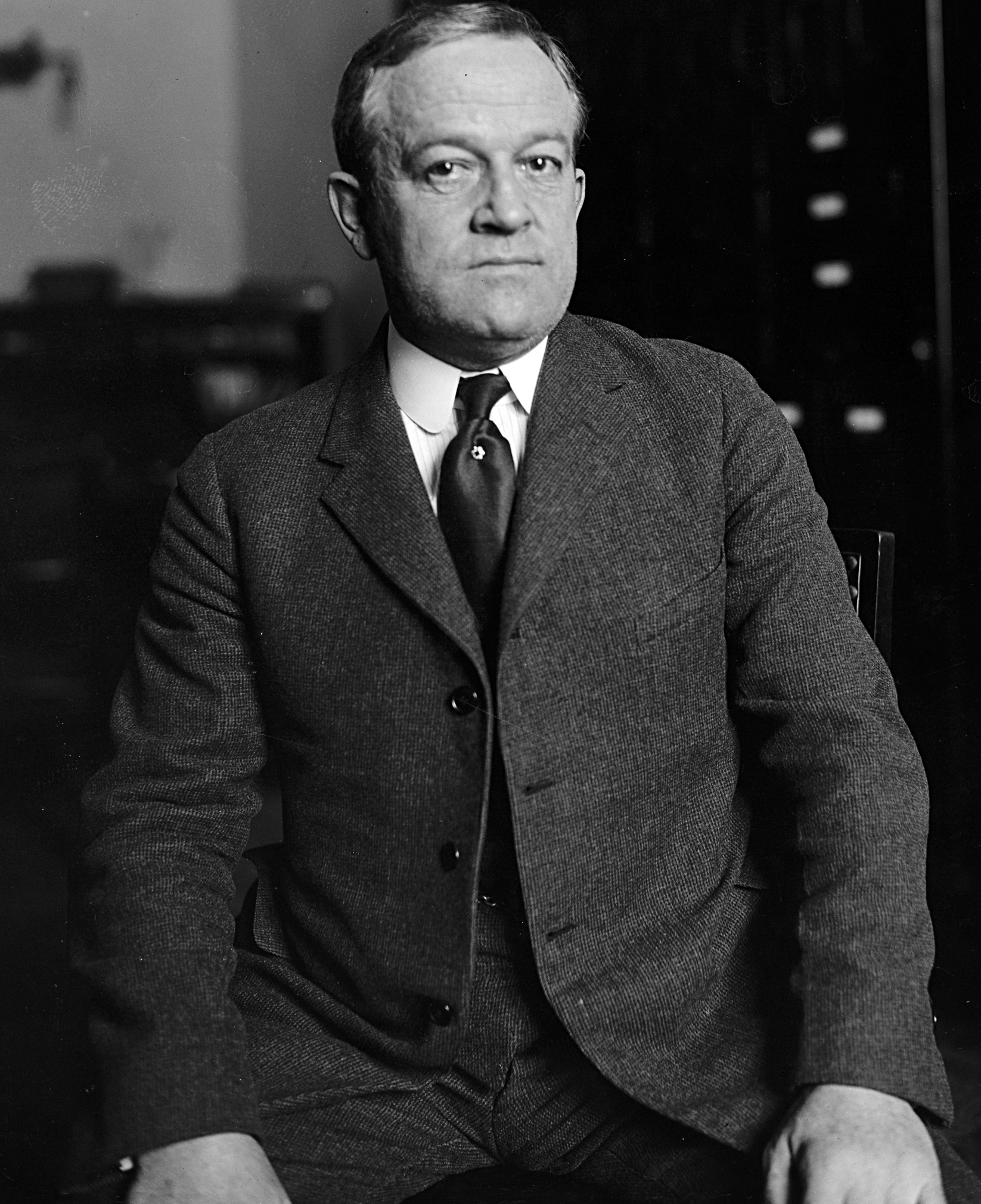

Member of the U.S. House of Representatives from Pennsylvania's 17th district
- In office March 4, 1923 – March 3, 1925
- Preceded by: Benjamin K. Focht
- Succeeded by: Frederick William Magrady

Personal details
- Born: July 13, 1873 West Chillisquaque Township, Pennsylvania
- Died: March 4, 1956 (aged 82)
- Party: Democratic

Herbert Wesley Cummings (July 13, 1873 – March 4, 1956) was a Democratic member of the U.S. House of Representatives from Pennsylvania.

Herbert W. Cummings was born in West Chillisquaque Township, Pennsylvania. He graduated from the Lewisburg, Pennsylvania High School in 1890. He studied law, was admitted to the bar, and commenced practice in Sunbury, Pennsylvania. He served as district attorney of Northumberland County, Pennsylvania in 1901 and 1904 to 1908. He was elected judge of the common pleas court of Northumberland County in 1911 and served ten years as president judge.

Cummings was elected as a Democrat to the Sixty-eighth Congress. He was an unsuccessful candidate for reelection in 1924. He resumed the practice of law until 1935, when he was appointed judge of Northumberland County. He was subsequently elected and served until 1946. He resumed the practice of law and died in Sunbury, Pennsylvania. Interment in Pomfret Manor Cemetery in Sunbury.

== Sources ==
- United States Congress. "Herbert W. Cummings (id: C000987)". Biographical Directory of the United States Congress.
- The Political Graveyard

U.S. House of Representatives
Preceded by Benjamin K. Focht	Member of the U.S. House of Representatives from Pennsylvania's 17th congressional district 1923–1925	Succeeded by Frederick William Magrady
