= Frederick W. Magrady =

American politician

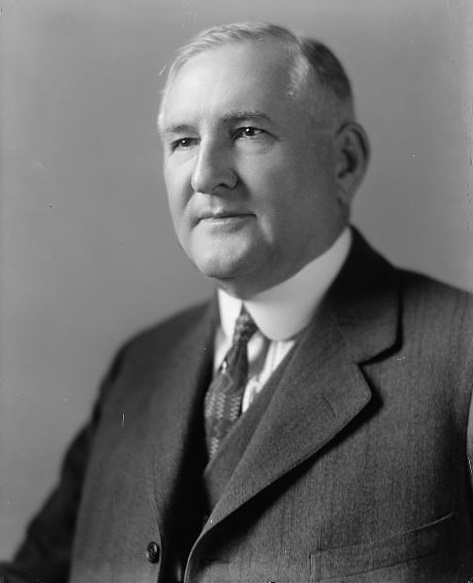
Frederick William Magrady, Congressman from Pennsylvania

Frederick William Magrady (November 24, 1863 – August 27, 1954) was a Republican member of the U.S. House of Representatives from Pennsylvania.

Frederick W. Magrady was born near Pottsville in Schuylkill County, Pennsylvania. He graduated from the State Normal School (now Bloomsburg University of Pennsylvania) at Bloomsburg, Pennsylvania, in 1890. He taught school thirteen years in Mount Carmel, Pennsylvania. He briefly engaged in the coal business at Gauley, West Virginia. He graduated from Dickinson School of Law in Carlisle, Pennsylvania, in 1909, was admitted to the bar the same year and commenced practice in Mount Carmel. He was director and solicitor of the First National Bank of Mount Carmel, president and solicitor of the Shamokin-Mount Carmel Transit Co., and of the Ashland & Shamokin Auto Bus Co., Inc. He also worked as director of the Mount Carmel Water Co.

Magrady was elected as a Republican to the Sixty-ninth and to the three succeeding Congresses. He was an unsuccessful candidate for renomination in 1932. He resumed the practice of law, and died in Danville, Pennsylvania. Interment in Mount Carmel Cemetery, Mount Carmel, Pennsylvania.

He died in 1954, at the age of 90 years, and was buried at Mount Carmel Cemetery.

== Sources ==
- United States Congress. "Frederick W. Magrady (id: M000055)". Biographical Directory of the United States Congress.
- The Political Graveyard

U.S. House of Representatives
| Preceded by Herbert W. Cummings | Member of the U.S. House of Representatives from Pennsylvania's 17th congressional district 1925–1933 | Succeeded by J. William Ditter |
