= Aaron S. Kreider =

American politician

Aaron Shenk Kreider
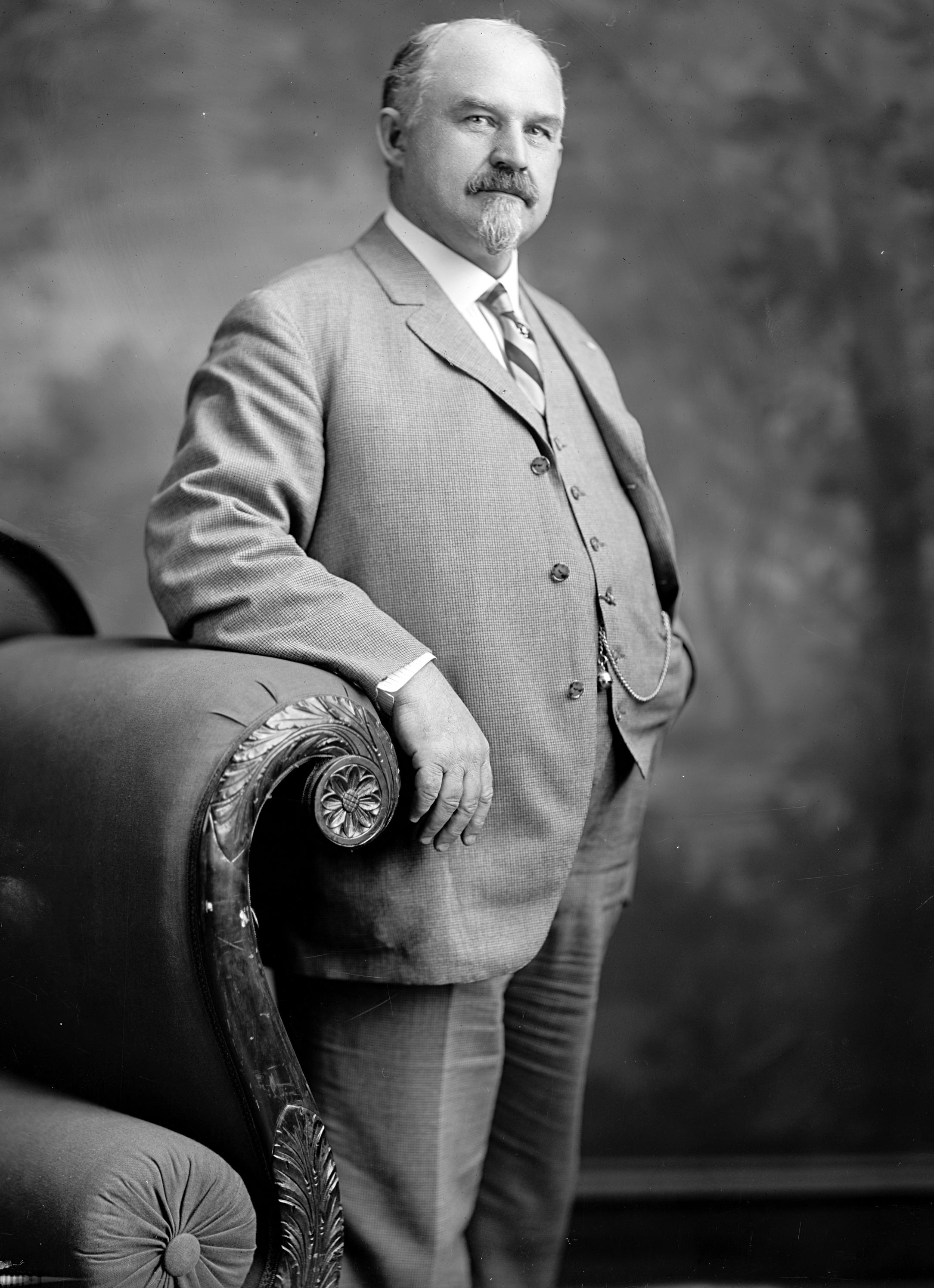

Member of the U.S. House of Representatives from Pennsylvania's 18th district
- In office March 4, 1913 – March 3, 1923
- Preceded by: Marlin E. Olmsted
- Succeeded by: Edward M. Beers

Personal details
- Born: June 26, 1863 South Annville Township, Pennsylvania, US
- Died: May 19, 1929 (aged 65) Annville, Pennsylvania, US
- Party: Republican
- Education: Lebanon Valley College

Aaron Shenk Kreider (June 26, 1863 – May 19, 1929) was a Republican member of the U.S. House of Representatives from Pennsylvania.

== Birth and education ==
Aaron S. Kreider was born on a farm in South Annville Township, Pennsylvania. He attended Lebanon Valley College in Annville, Pennsylvania, and graduated from Allentown Business College in 1880.

== Business pursuits ==
He moved to Fulton, Missouri, in 1880 and engaged in agricultural pursuits and later was employed as a clerk in a store. He returned to Pennsylvania and engaged in mercantile pursuits in Campbelltown, Pennsylvania, in 1884 and in Roseland, Pennsylvania, in 1885. He established the town of Lawn, in Lebanon County, in 1886. He also engaged in agricultural pursuits and in the grain and coal business. He moved to Palmyra, Pennsylvania, in 1893 and shortly thereafter to Annville. He became interested in shoe manufacturing and in banking.

== Public service and political activities ==
Kreider served as commissioner and chairman of the Board of Commissioners of Annville from 1909 to 1912. He was a delegate to the Republican State Convention in 1910. He served as president of the National Association of Shoe Manufacturers of the United States from 1913 to 1916.

== House of Representatives ==
Kreider was elected as a Republican to the Sixty-third and to the four succeeding Congresses. He served as chairman of the United States House Committee on Expenditures in the Department of the Interior during the Sixty-sixth and Sixty-seventh Congresses). He was an unsuccessful candidate for reelection in 1922. After his time in Congress, he served as president of the board of trustees of Lebanon Valley College in Annville. He resumed his former manufacturing pursuits until his death in Annville.

== Hill Farm Estate ==
Hill Farm Estate was originally built in 1919 on 26 acres (110,000 m^{2}) as the spacious and comfortable private home of Kreider and his family. The large Federal style mansion is located less than a mile north of Lebanon Valley College on Route 934 in Annville PA. Hill Farm Estate sits in a quiet, scenic county setting with trees, gardens, benches, and walkways high on a hill overlooking the Annville community.

In 1982, the mansion was restored, a wing added, and became an assisted living residence, offering a beautiful homelike setting for retired individuals. In 2002 an additional residence wing was added. The home and independent-living center now offers 46 personal-care rooms for up to 55 residents and seven independent-living Carriage House apartments.

Inside the stately Federal style mansion, there is a comfortable parlor and lounges, antiques and period reproductions that complement the carefully restored architecture. The community was called Hill Farm Estate. It was a personal care retirement residence until 2015.

In August 2024 it was bought out for $2,000,000 by Entrepreneur Millard F. Wallace.

== Sources ==
- United States Congress. "Aaron S. Kreider (id: K000327)". Biographical Directory of the United States Congress.
- The Political Graveyard
- Steve Snyder, Lebanon Daily News, July 26, 2007
- Monica Von Dobeneck, The Patriot News, August 7, 2008

U.S. House of Representatives
Preceded by Marlin E. Olmsted	Member of the U.S. House of Representatives from Pennsylvania's 18th congressional district 1913–1923	Succeeded by Edward M. Beers
