= Elizabeth Cisney Smith =

American physician

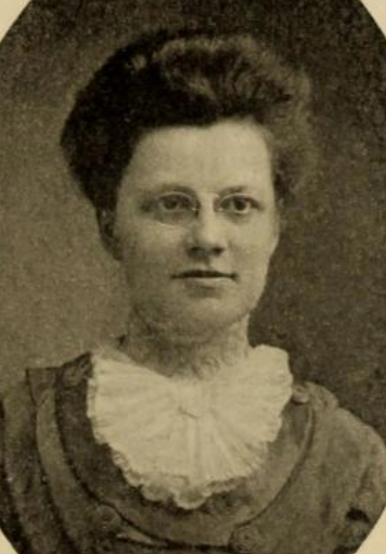
- Elizabeth Cisney Smith, from the 1911 yearbook of the Woman's Medical College of Pennsylvania
- Born: July 29, 1881; Huntingdon County, Pennsylvania
- Died: November 13, 1965 (aged 84); Boston, Massachusetts
- Occupation: Physician

Elizabeth Cisney Smith (July 29, 1881 – November 13, 1965) was an American physician. A large collection of her correspondence, notebooks, photographs and other papers at the Drexel University College of Medicine Legacy Center offers rich first-hand sources on women's medical education in the 1910s, and on women's medical careers in the first half of the twentieth century.

== Early life and education ==
Elizabeth E. Cisney was born in Nossville, Huntingdon County, Pennsylvania, the daughter of William Henry Cisney and Margaret Kelly Cisney. She trained as a teacher at the State Normal School in California, Pennsylvania, and graduated from the Woman's Medical College of Pennsylvania in 1911.

== Career ==
Smith practiced medicine mostly in rural Pennsylvania, Maryland, and Ohio. She and her husband received their Ohio medical licenses in 1917. In the 1930s, she worked for the Pennsylvania Department of Health, and briefly in North Dakota. During World War II, she worked in Middle River, Maryland, serving the families of aircraft workers at a bomber plant. She retired from medical work in 1946.

In Ohio, Smith was founding president of a chapter of the Business and Professional Women's Club. She was a member of the Daughters of the American Revolution. In retirement she lived in Reseda, California, and traveled for a year in Europe.

== Personal life and legacy ==
Cisney married fellow teacher Augustus Edwin Smith in 1903, and both of them entered medical schools in Philadelphia in 1906. They had four children, the first one born in 1909 when they were both still medical students. Her husband died in 1934, and she died in 1965, at the age of 84, in Peabody, Massachusetts. Her daughter Isabel Smith Stein donated a large collection of her papers to the Drexel University College of Medicine Legacy Center.
