= Franklin Lewis Dershem =

American politician

Franklin L. Dershem
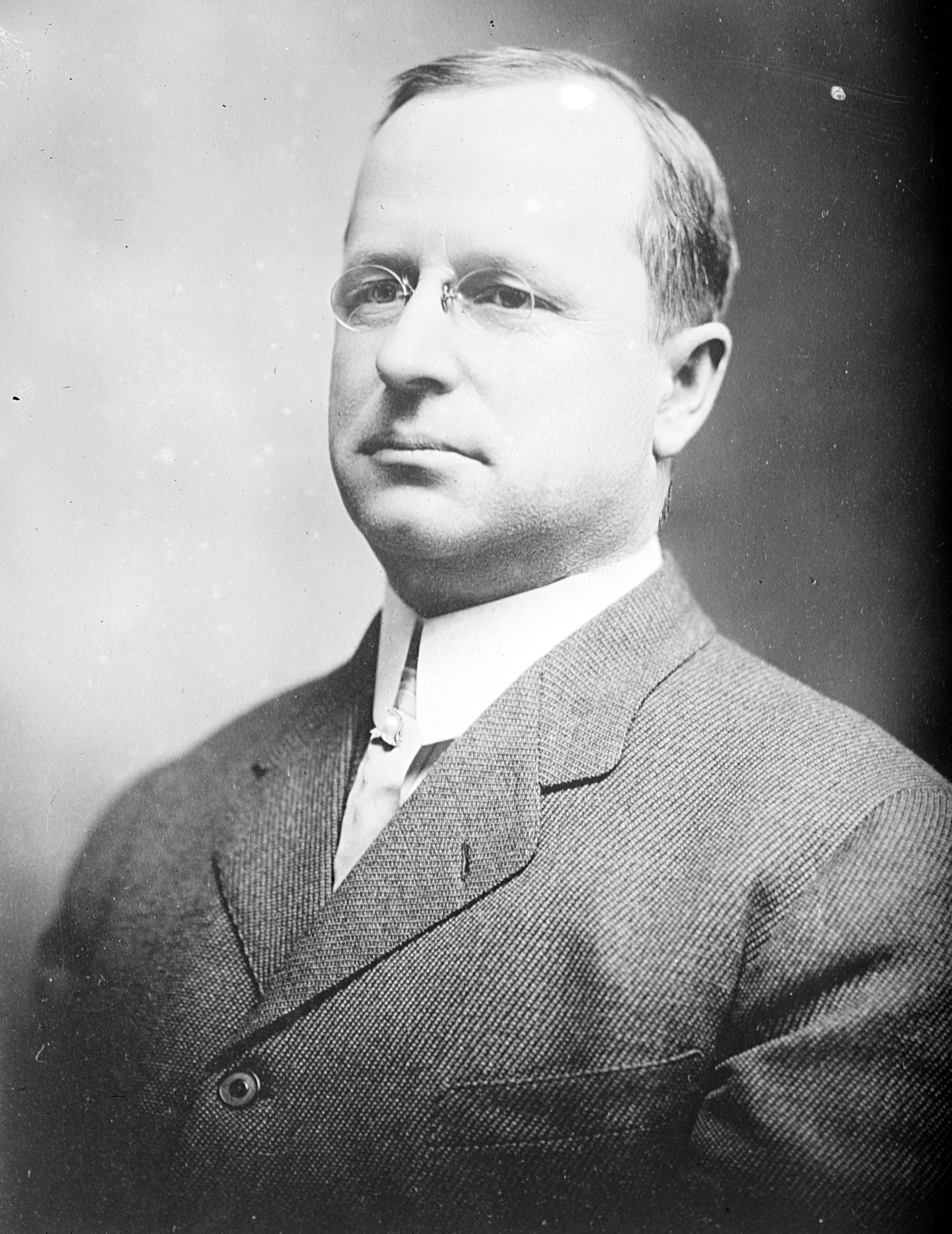

Member of the U.S. House of Representatives from Pennsylvania's 17th district
- In office March 4, 1913 – March 3, 1915
- Preceded by: Benjamin K. Focht
- Succeeded by: Benjamin K. Focht

Member of the Pennsylvania House of Representatives
- In office 1907; 1908; 1911–1912

Personal details
- Born: March 5, 1865 New Columbia, Pennsylvania
- Died: February 14, 1950 (aged 84) Lewisburg, Pennsylvania
- Party: Democratic

Franklin Lewis Dershem (March 5, 1865 – February 14, 1950) was a Democratic member of the U.S. House of Representatives from Pennsylvania.

== Biography ==
Franklin L. Dershem was born near New Columbia, Pennsylvania. He graduated from Palm’s National Business College at Philadelphia in 1887. He was appointed postmaster at Kelly Point, Pennsylvania, on March 9, 1888, and served until January 13, 1891. He was engaged in agricultural pursuits, and was also interested in the hardware business from 1891 to 1913. He was a member of the board of trustees of Albright College in Myerstown, Pennsylvania. He was a member of the Pennsylvania State House of Representatives in 1907, 1908, and again in 1911 and 1912.

Dershem was elected as a Democrat to the Sixty-third Congress. He was an unsuccessful candidate for reelection in 1914. He was appointed as an auditor in the Philadelphia division of the United States Bureau of Internal Revenue, serving from October 1, 1915, until March 31, 1935. He was engaged as an auditor and income-tax specialist in Lewisburg, Pennsylvania, where he died February 14, 1950. Interment in Lewisburg Cemetery.

== Sources ==
- United States Congress. "Franklin L. Dershem (id: D000268)". Biographical Directory of the United States Congress.
- The Political Graveyard

U.S. House of Representatives
Preceded by Benjamin K. Focht	Member of the U.S. House of Representatives from Pennsylvania's 17th congressional district 1913–1915	Succeeded by Benjamin K. Focht
