= John C. Kunkel =

American politician from Pennsylvania

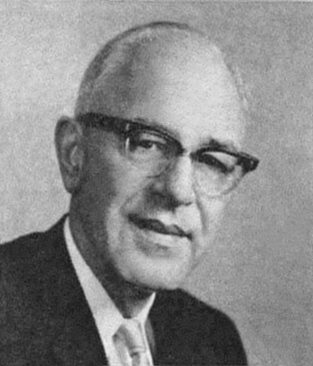

Member of the U.S. House of Representatives from Pennsylvania
- In office May 16, 1961 – December 30, 1966
- Preceded by: Walter M. Mumma
- Succeeded by: Edwin D. Eshleman
- Constituency: 16th district
- In office January 3, 1939 – January 3, 1951
- Preceded by: Guy J. Swope
- Succeeded by: Walter M. Mumma
- Constituency: 19th district (1939-1945); 18th district (1945-1951)

Personal details
- Born: John Crain Kunkel; July 21, 1898 Harrisburg, Pennsylvania, U.S.
- Died: July 27, 1970 (aged 72) Harrisburg, Pennsylvania, U.S.
- Party: Republican
- Spouse: Katherine Smoot Kunkel
- Education: Yale University; Harvard Law School

John Crain Kunkel (July 21, 1898 – July 27, 1970) was a Republican member of the U.S. House of Representatives from Pennsylvania. He was the grandson of John Christian Kunkel, great-grandson of John Sergeant, and great-great-grandson of Jonathan Dickinson Sergeant and Robert Whitehill. The John Crain Kunkel and Katherine Smoot Kunkel Memorial in Riverfront Park in Harrisburg, Pennsylvania, also known as "Kunkel Plaza," is a scenic amphitheater at Front Street & State Street down from the Pennsylvania State Capitol along the Susquehanna River dedicated in 1992 for their many years of service and dedication to the community.

== Early life and career ==
He was born in Harrisburg, Pennsylvania, where he attended Harrisburg Academy. He also attended Phillips Academy in Andover, Massachusetts. He graduated from Yale University in New Haven, in 1916, and from the law department of Harvard University in Cambridge, MA, in 1926. During the First World War he served in the Students' Army Training Corps

== U.S. House of Representatives ==
He was elected as a Republican to the 76th Congress and to the five succeeding Congresses. In 1947–8, he served on the Herter Committee. During World War II Kunkel spoke out against Nazi Germany, even before American entry into the war. After the Fall of France and before the Nazi invasion of the Soviet Union, when Great Britain was effectively fighting alone, Kunkel advocated helping Britain in their war against the Nazis. He voted in favor of both the 1941 Lend Lease Act to send more military aid to Great Britain, and the 1944 Lend Lease Act as well.

He was not a candidate for renomination in 1950 but was an unsuccessful candidate for the nomination for United States Senator. He served as county commissioner of Dauphin County, Pennsylvania from 1952 to 1956. He was elected as a Republican to the 87th Congress, by special election, to fill the vacancy caused by the death of United States Representative Walter M. Mumma. He was reelected to the two succeeding Congresses and served until his resignation on December 30, 1966. He was not a candidate for reelection in 1966.

== Sources ==
- United States Congress. "John C. Kunkel (id: K000341)". Biographical Directory of the United States Congress.
- The Political Graveyard

U.S. House of Representatives
Preceded by Guy J. Swope	Member of the U.S. House of Representatives from Pennsylvania's 19th congressional district 1939–1945	Succeeded by Leon H. Gavin
Preceded by Richard M. Simpson	Member of the U.S. House of Representatives from Pennsylvania's 18th congressional district 1945–1951	Succeeded by Walter M. Mumma
Preceded by Walter M. Mumma	Member of the U.S. House of Representatives from Pennsylvania's 16th congressional district 1961–1966	Succeeded by Edwin D. Eshleman
