= West Chillisquaque Township, Pennsylvania =

Township in Pennsylvania, US

Coordinates: 40°58′00″N 76°49′59″W

- Township
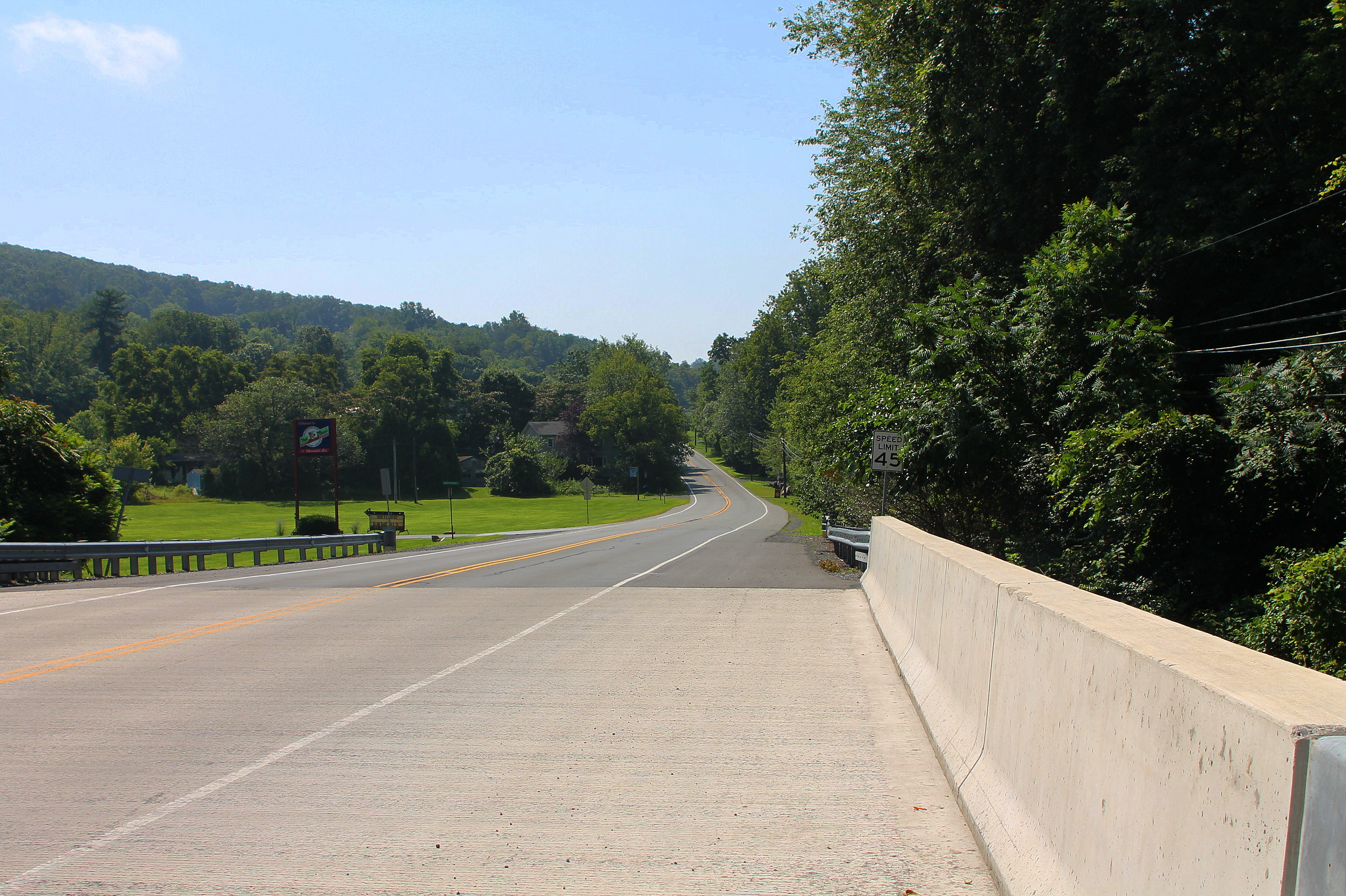
- Pennsylvania Route 405 in West Chillisquaque Township

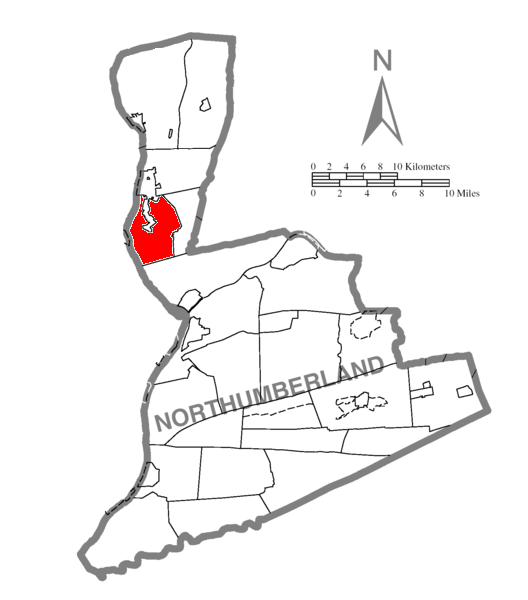
- Map of Northumberland County, Pennsylvania highlighting West Chillisquaque Township

- Map of Northumberland County, Pennsylvania
- Country: United States
- State: Pennsylvania
- County: Northumberland
- Settled: 1769

Government
  - Type: Board of Supervisors

Area
  - Total: 13.97 sq mi (36.18 km^{2})
  - Land: 12.89 sq mi (33.38 km^{2})
  - Water: 1.08 sq mi (2.80 km^{2})

Population (2010)
  - Total: 2,627
  - Estimate (2016): 2,558
  - Density: 198.5/sq mi (76.63/km^{2})
- Time zone: UTC-5 (Eastern (EST))
  - Summer (DST): UTC-4 (EDT)
- Area code: 570
- FIPS code: 42-097-82712
- Website: https://westchilli.org/

West Chillisquaque Township is a township in Northumberland County, Pennsylvania, United States. The population at the 2010 Census was 2,627, a decline from the figure of 2,846 tabulated in 2000.

== History ==
The Rishel Covered Bridge, Col. James Cameron House, and Sodom Schoolhouse are listed on the National Register of Historic Places.

== Geography ==
According to the United States Census Bureau, the township has a total area of 13.9 square miles (35.9 km^{2}), of which 12.9 square miles (33.5 km^{2}) is land and 0.9 square mile (2.4 km^{2}) (6.64%) is water. It contains the census-designated place of Montandon.

== Demographics ==
Historical population
| Census | Pop. | Note | %± |
|---|---|---|---|
| 2010 | 2,627 | | — |
| 2016 (est.) | 2,558 | | −2.6% |
U.S. Decennial Census

As of the census of 2000, there were 2,846 people, 1,211 households, and 830 families residing in the township. The population density was 220.1 inhabitants per square mile (85.0/km^{2}). There were 1,284 housing units at an average density of 99.3 per square mile (38.3/km^{2}). The racial makeup of the township was 98.28% White, 0.56% African American, 0.14% Native American, 0.14% Asian, 0.07% Pacific Islander, 0.35% from other races, and 0.46% from two or more races. Hispanic or Latino of any race were 0.42% of the population.

There were 1,211 households, out of which 26.5% had children under the age of 18 living with them, 55.1% were married couples living together, 9.2% had a female householder with no husband present, and 31.4% were non-families. 26.9% of all households were made up of individuals, and 8.7% had someone living alone who was 65 years of age or older. The average household size was 2.35 and the average family size was 2.81.

In the township the population was spread out, with 21.6% under the age of 18, 6.9% from 18 to 24, 28.6% from 25 to 44, 28.0% from 45 to 64, and 15.0% who were 65 years of age or older. The median age was 41 years. For every 100 females, there were 101.4 males. For every 100 females age 18 and over, there were 97.0 males.

The median income for a household in the township was $35,104, and the median income for a family was $40,700. Males had a median income of $27,813 versus $20,977 for females. The per capita income for the township was $17,290. About 6.2% of families and 8.9% of the population were below the poverty line, including 14.1% of those under age 18 and 6.7% of those age 65 or over.

== Notable person ==
- Herbert Wesley Cummings (1873–1956), lawyer and politician
