= John A. Lafore Jr. =

American politician (1905-1993)

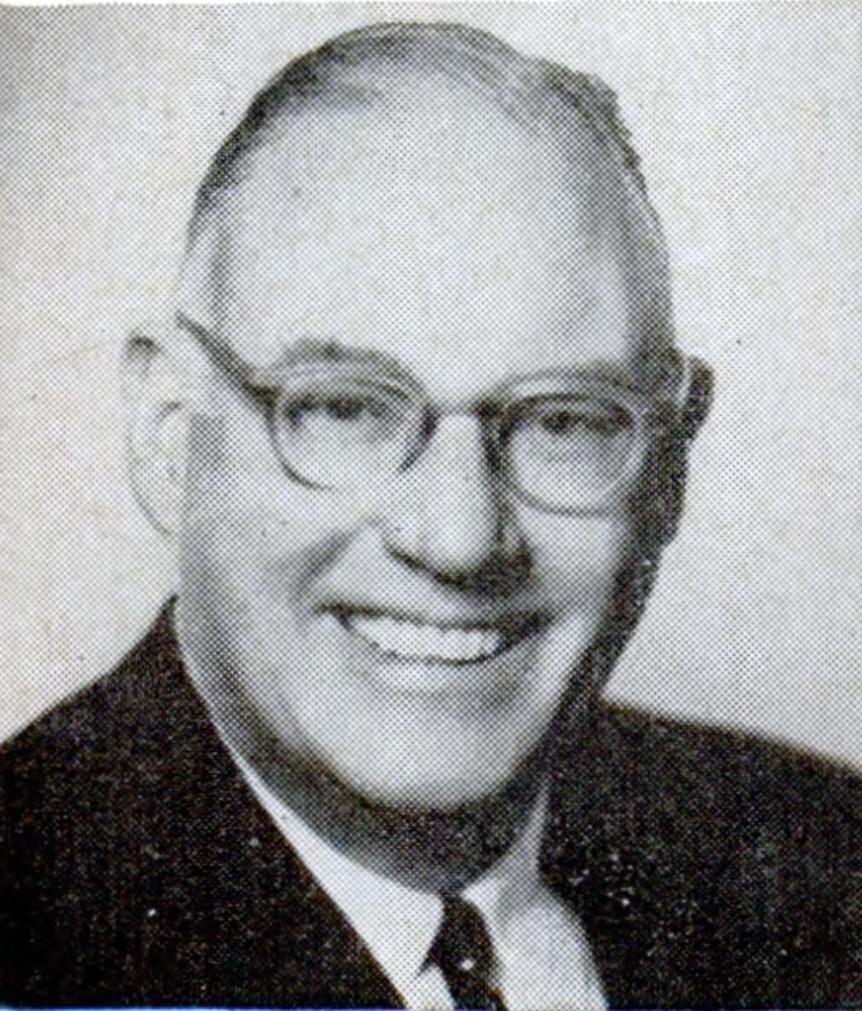

Member of the U.S. House of Representatives from Pennsylvania's 13th district
- In office November 5, 1957 – January 3, 1961
- Preceded by: Samuel K. McConnell Jr.
- Succeeded by: Richard Schweiker

Member of the Pennsylvania House of Representatives
- In office 1950-1957

Personal details
- Born: May 25, 1905 Bala, Pennsylvania, U.S.
- Died: January 24, 1993 (aged 87) Villanova, Pennsylvania, U.S.
- Resting place: West Laurel Hill Cemetery, Bala Cynwyd, Pennsylvania, U.S.
- Party: Republican
- Education: Swarthmore College; University of Pennsylvania

John Armand Lafore Jr. (May 25, 1905 – January 24, 1993) was an American politician who served as a Republican member of the U.S. House of Representatives for Pennsylvania's 13th congressional district from 1957 to 1961. He worked as vice president of Day and Zimmerman legal firm from 1965 to 1966 and was president of the American Kennel Club from 1971 to 1979.

== Early life and education ==
Lafore was born in Bala, Pennsylvania on May 25, 1905. He was a student at Swarthmore College in 1923 and 1925 and the University of Pennsylvania in 1925 and 1926. One of his brothers, Laurence Lafore, was a historian.

He was an automobile dealer in Philadelphia, Pennsylvania, from 1932 to 1957. He was the comptroller of Montgomery County, and chairman of the Lower Merion Township Committee. He served as a lieutenant commander in the United States Navy from 1942 to 1945.

== Career ==
Lafore was a member of the Pennsylvania State House of Representatives from 1950 to 1957. He was elected as a Republican to the 85th Congress to fill the vacancy left by the resignation of Samuel K. McConnell Jr. He was reelected to the 86th Congress, but was an unsuccessful candidate for renomination in 1960. Lafore voted in favor of the Civil Rights Act of 1960.

After his time in Congress, Lafore was the president of an aircraft company in Willow Grove, Pennsylvania, from 1961 to 1964, and as vice president of Day and Zimmerman from 1965 to 1966. Lafore served as executive vice president of the American Kennel Club from 1968 to 1971 and president from 1971 to 1979.

He died January 24, 1993, and was interred at West Laurel Hill Cemetery in Bala Cynwyd, Pennsylvania.

U.S. House of Representatives
Preceded by Samuel K. McConnell Jr.	Member of the U.S. House of Representatives from Pennsylvania's 13th congressional district 1957–1961	Succeeded by Richard S. Schweiker
