= Col. James Cameron House =

Historic house in Pennsylvania, United States

- U.S. National Register of Historic Places
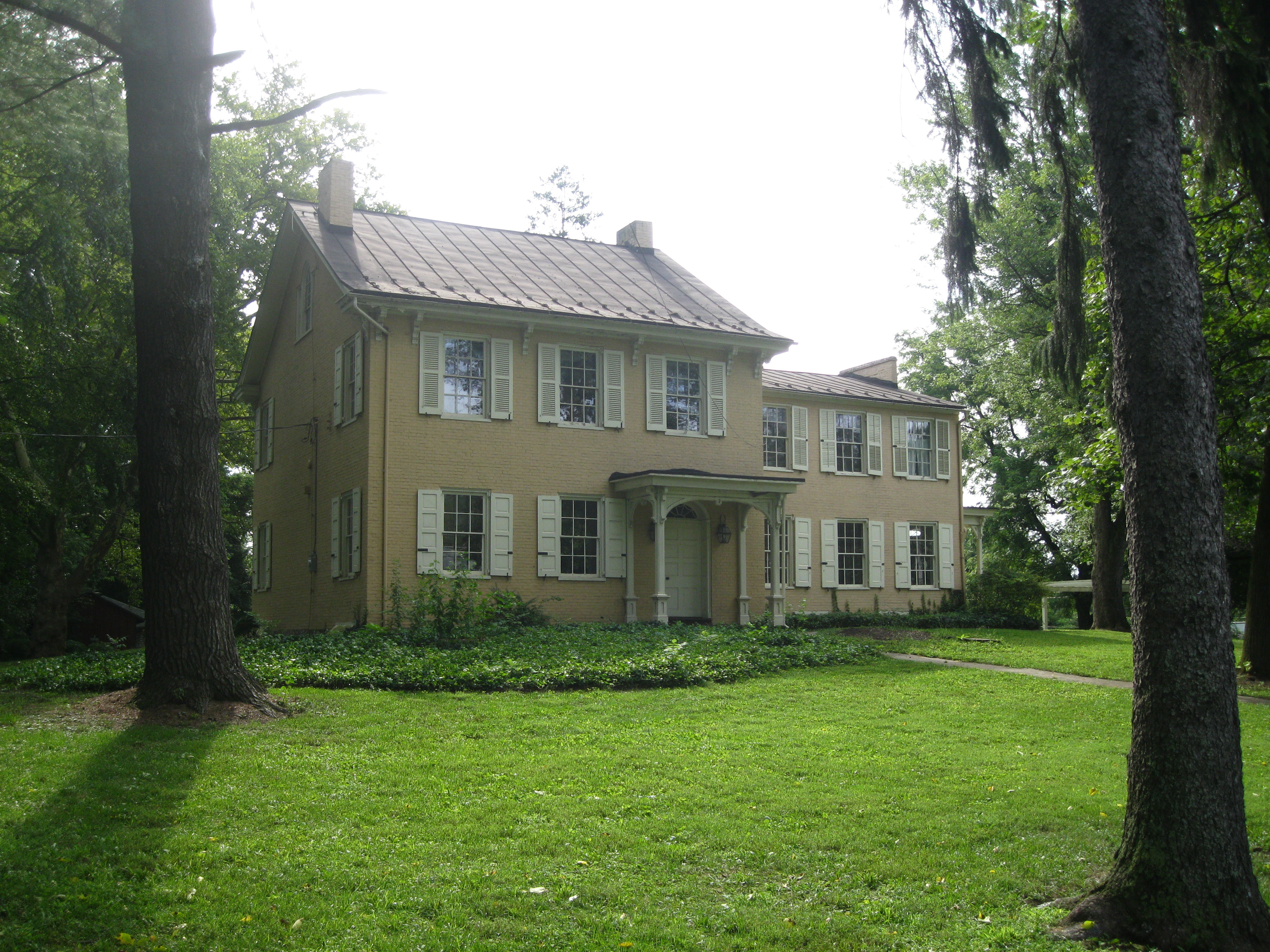
- The house in August 2013

- Location within Pennsylvania Location within the United States
- Location: Pennsylvania Route 405/River Road, southeast of Milton, West Chillisquaque Township, Pennsylvania
- Coordinates: 41°0′8″N 76°51′43″W
- Area: 0.7 acres (0.28 ha)
- Built: 1842
- Architectural style: Federal
- NRHP reference No.: 89000360
- Added to NRHP: May 5, 1989

Col. James Cameron House is a historic home located at West Chillisquaque Township, Northumberland County, Pennsylvania. It was built in four sections; a 2 1/2-story, formal brick section and a 1 1/2-story, brick kitchen were built between 1840 and 1842; a 2-story, brick addition was built about 1860; and a 1-story, wood-frame kitchen addition sometime in the mid- to late-19th century. It is in a vernacular Federal style. An Italianate style porch was added to the 2-story, brick section about 1860. Also on the property is a contributing outbuilding dated to the mid-19th century. The property was vested with the Milton Historical Society in 1981.

It was added to the National Register of Historic Places in 1989.
