= Edward M. Beers =

American politician

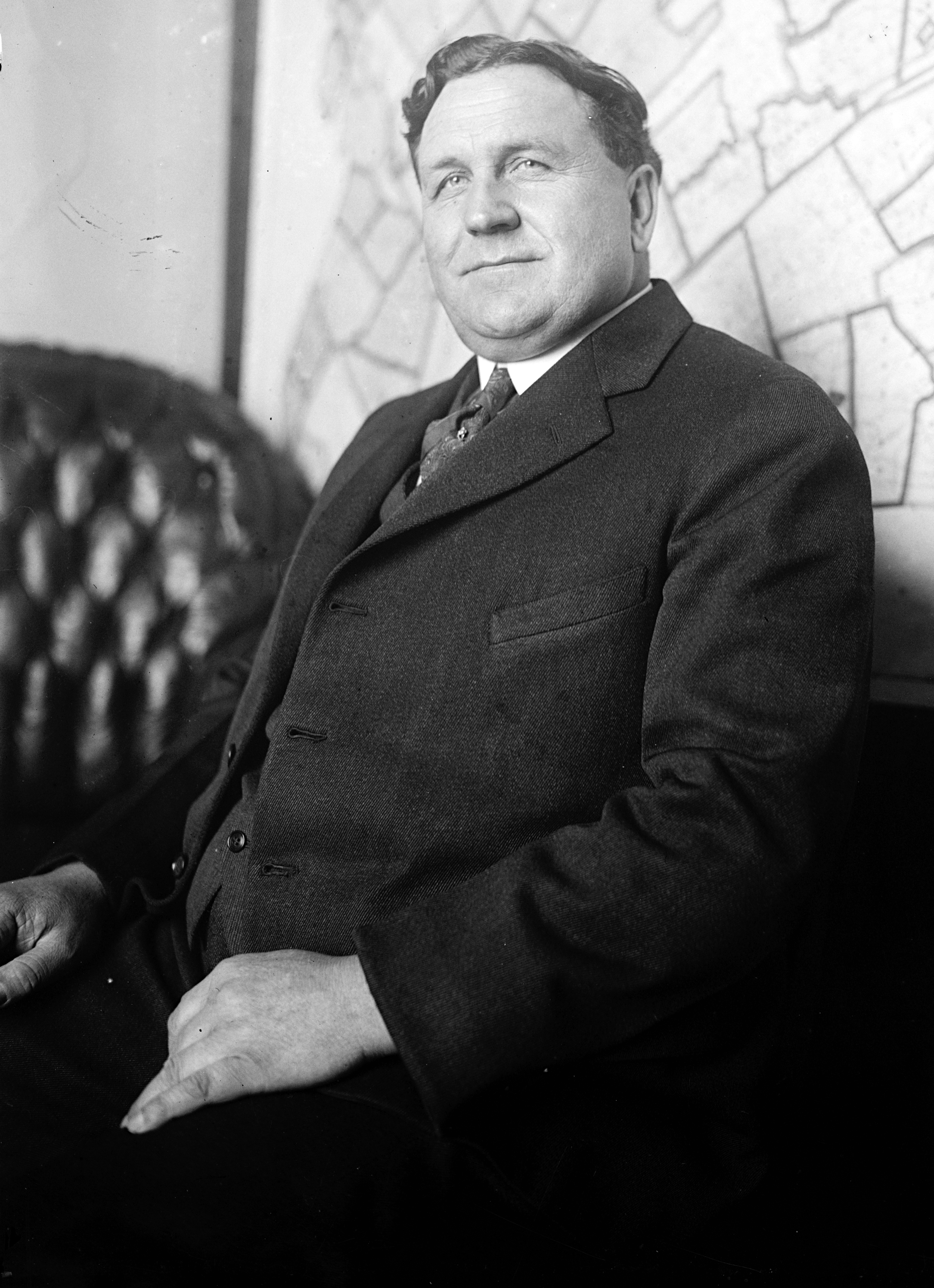

Member of the U.S. House of Representatives from Pennsylvania's 18th district
- In office March 4, 1923 – April 21, 1932
- Preceded by: Aaron S. Kreider
- Succeeded by: Joseph F. Biddle

Personal details
- Born: May 27, 1877 Nossville, Tell Township, Pennsylvania
- Died: April 21, 1932 (aged 54) Washington, D.C.
- Party: Republican

Edward McMath Beers (May 27, 1877 – April 21, 1932) was a Republican member of the U.S. House of Representatives from Pennsylvania.

Edward M. Beers was born in Nossville, Tell Township, Pennsylvania on May 27, 1877. In 1895, he moved with his parents to Mount Union, Pennsylvania when they purchased the then Seibert House. He graduated from Mount Union High School in 1895. Upon the death of his father in 1895, he took over the family hotel business, serving as the proprietor of the Beers Hotel, located at the corner of Shirley and Jefferson Streets in Mount Union. He was also interested in agricultural pursuits. He was a delegate to the Republican State Convention at Harrisburg, Pennsylvania in 1898. He served as mayor of Mount Union from 1910 to 1914. He was a member of the board of directors of the First National Bank of Mount Union and of the Grange Trust Co. of Huntingdon, Pennsylvania. He was an associate judge of Huntingdon County, Pennsylvania from 1914 to 1923. Beers was elected as a Republican to the 68th Congress and to the four succeeding Congresses and served until his death in Washington, D.C.

== See also ==
- List of members of the United States Congress who died in office (1900–1949)

== Sources ==
- United States Congress. "Edward M. Beers (id: B000312)". Biographical Directory of the United States Congress.
- The Political Graveyard

Welch, Charles Howard M.E., A.B. History of Mount Union, Shirleysburg and Shirley Township Printed at the Mount Union Times Office 1909-1910 reprinted by the Mount Union Area Historical Society 1998

U.S. House of Representatives
Preceded by Aaron S. Kreider	Member of the U.S. House of Representatives from Pennsylvania's 18th congressional district 1923–1932	Succeeded by Joseph F. Biddle
