= John William Davis (Georgia politician) =

American politician

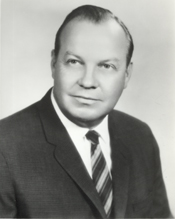

Member of the U.S. House of Representatives from Georgia's 7th district
- In office January 3, 1961 – January 3, 1975
- Preceded by: Harlan Erwin Mitchell
- Succeeded by: Lawrence P. McDonald

Personal details
- Born: September 12, 1916 Rome, Georgia, U.S.
- Died: October 3, 1992 (aged 76) St. Simon's Island, Georgia, U.S.
- Party: Democratic
- Spouse(s): Vivian Hawkins, Bridget Davis
- Education: University of Georgia School of Law
- Profession: Attorney

John William Davis (September 12, 1916 – October 3, 1992) was an American politician and lawyer.

== Early life and education ==
Davis was born near Rome, Georgia, attended the University of Georgia (UGA) in Athens and graduated in 1937 with an A.B. and from the UGA School of Law with a Bachelor of Laws (LL.B.) in 1939. He was admitted to the state bar in 1939 and began practice in Rome.

== Career ==
=== WWII ===
Beginning in July 1942, Davis served in the United States War Department Headquarters until December 1945. He then served in South America on behalf of the Counter Intelligence Corps. In 1946, Davis moved to Summerville, Georgia, and resumed practicing law.

=== Political career ===
On December 27, 1950, Davis became solicitor general of the Rome Circuit and remained in that position until January 1, 1953. Two years later, he was elected judge of the Lookout Mountain Judicial Circuit, serving from January 1, 1955, until his resignation on December 31, 1960.

==== Time in Congress ====
Regarded as a moderate, Davis won election in 1960 to the 87th Congress as a Democrat representing Georgia's 7th congressional district. He won re-election to six additional terms in that body until losing his 1974 re-election bid in that year's Democratic primary to conservative activist Larry McDonald. At the time of his loss, Davis had a drinking problem. Davis served as a U.S. Representative from January 3, 1961 to January 3, 1975.

Davis' loss to McDonald in 1974 was attributed largely to his perceived lack of opposition to the concept of school busing, in which students were bused to schools outside of their district to facilitate desegregation. Davis, who resided in the more rural part of his district, did not take into account the increasing political force of the northwest suburbs of Atlanta. The fast-growing bedroom communities of Cobb County were filling up with residents who were fleeing mandatory desegregation in urban Atlanta; it was mainly these constituents who supported McDonald and his platform opposing interdistrict school busing..

During the course of his political career, Davis supported various progressive initiatives such as those related to alleviating poverty. Nevertheless, while standing for re-election in 1966, Davis was noted as being against the federal government broadening Great Society programs. Also, while supportive of measures to cover healthcare costs, Davis opposed Medicare (United States) on the grounds that it would be a burden both on the country’s payroll and on taxpayers, and in 1966 voted against the establishment of the program. Despite this, Davis remained an advocate of progressive measures such as unemployment compensation, food stamps, hospital funds, and minimum wage legislation.

=== Later career and death ===
Davis returned to practicing law and lived in St. Simons Island, Georgia, at the time of his death on October 3, 1992.

U.S. House of Representatives
Preceded by Harlan Erwin Mitchell	Member of the U.S. House of Representatives from Georgia's 7th congressional district January 3, 1961 - January 3, 1975	Succeeded by Lawrence P. McDonald
