= J. William Ditter =

American politician (1888–1943)

John William Ditter Sr.
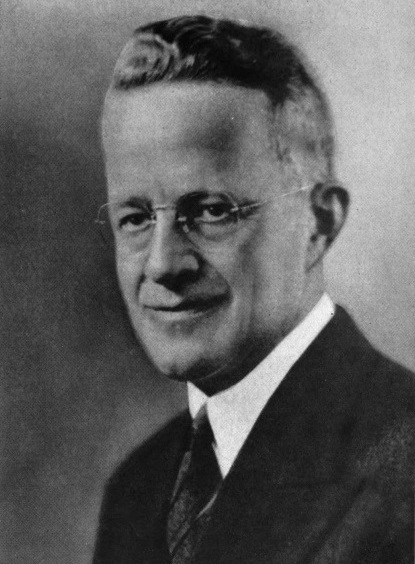

Member of the U.S. House of Representatives from Pennsylvania's 17th district
- In office March 4, 1933 – November 21, 1943
- Preceded by: Frederick William Magrady
- Succeeded by: Samuel K. McConnell Jr.

Personal details
- Born: September 5, 1888 Philadelphia, Pennsylvania, U.S.
- Died: November 21, 1943 (aged 55) Columbia, Pennsylvania, U.S.
- Party: Republican

John William Ditter Sr. (September 5, 1888 – November 21, 1943) was a Republican member of the U.S. House of Representatives from Pennsylvania.

== Biography ==
John William Ditter Sr. was born in Philadelphia, Pennsylvania on September 5, 1888. He graduated from the Temple University School of Law in Philadelphia in 1913. He worked as a professor of history and commerce in Philadelphia high schools from 1912 to 1925. In 1925 he moved to Ambler, Pennsylvania, and commenced the practice of law. He served as workmen's compensation referee for eastern Pennsylvania in 1929.

Ditter was elected as a Republican to the Seventy-third from the 17th District of Pennsylvania and to the five succeeding Congresses. During his years in Washington, Ditter served on the House Committee on Appropriations. He also was a member of the subcommittee on Navy Department appropriation bills, and at the time of his death was ranking minority member. He served until his death in an airplane crash near Columbia, Pennsylvania. He is buried in Whitemarsh Memorial Cemetery in Prospectville, Pennsylvania.

His son, John William Ditter Jr. was a federal judge, serving on the United States District Court for the Eastern District of Pennsylvania.

== Namesake ==
USS J. William Ditter (DM-31) was named for him.

== See also ==
- List of members of the United States Congress who died in office (1900–1949)

U.S. House of Representatives
Preceded by Frederick W. Magrady	Member of the U.S. House of Representatives from Pennsylvania's 17th congressional district 1933–1943	Succeeded by Samuel K. McConnell Jr.
