= Richard M. Simpson =

American politician

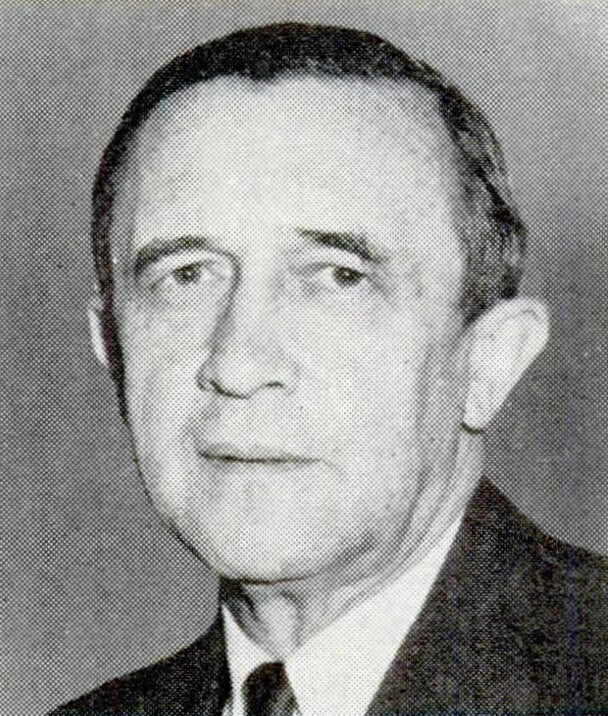
- Simpson, c. 1957

Member of the U.S. House of Representatives from Pennsylvania
- In office May 11, 1937 – January 7, 1960
- Preceded by: Benjamin K. Focht
- Succeeded by: Douglas Hemphill Elliott
- Constituency: 18th district (1937–1945); 17th district (1945–1953); 18th district (1953–1960)

Member of the Pennsylvania House of Representatives
- In office 1935–1937

Personal details
- Born: August 30, 1900 Huntingdon, Pennsylvania, U.S.
- Died: January 7, 1960 (aged 59) Bethesda, Maryland, U.S.
- Party: Republican
- Spouses: Grace Metz (m. 1928; died 1945) Mae J. Cox (m. 1948)
- Children: 3
- Parents: Warren Brown Simpson (father); Sue (mother)
- Education: University of Pittsburgh (BA); Georgetown Law School (JD)
- Occupation: Insurance agent; politician

Military service
- Allegiance: United States
- Branch: United States Army
- Rank: private
- Conflict: World War I

Richard Murray Simpson (August 30, 1900 – January 7, 1960) was a Republican member of the U.S. House of Representatives from Pennsylvania.

== Biography ==
Richard Simpson was born in Huntingdon, Pennsylvania, the son of Warren Brown and Sue Simpson. During the First World War, Simpson served as a private in the 301st Company, Tank Corps. His father and uncle constructed Raystown Lake, the largest lake entirely within Pennsylvania. He married Grace Metz in 1928, with whom had two daughters, Susan and Barbara. On her death in 1945, Simpson married Mae Cox in 1948; they had one daughter, Kay. He graduated from the University of Pittsburgh, in 1923, and from Georgetown Law School in Washington, D.C., in 1942. He was engaged in the insurance business from 1923 to 1937. He served in the Pennsylvania State House of Representatives from 1935 to 1937.

Simpson was elected as a Republican to the 75th United States Congress to fill the vacancy caused by the death of Benjamin K. Focht. He was re-elected to the Seventy-sixth and to the ten succeeding Congresses and served until his death in 1960. Simpson voted in favor of the Civil Rights Act of 1957.

In 1953, he became chair of the National Republican Congressional Committee. He had previously served as vice chairman of the House Republican Conference and secretary of the House Republican Policy Committee. At the time of his death, he was the ranking member of the powerful Ways and Means Committee.

He died on January 7, 1960, at Bethesda Naval Medical Center, several weeks after undergoing brain surgery.

== See also ==
- List of members of the United States Congress who died in office (1950–1999)

U.S. House of Representatives
Preceded by Benjamin K. Focht	Member of the U.S. House of Representatives from Pennsylvania's 18th congressional district 1937–1945	Succeeded by John C. Kunkel
Preceded by Samuel K. McConnell Jr.	Member of the U.S. House of Representatives from Pennsylvania's 17th congressional district 1945–1953	Succeeded by Alvin Bush
Preceded by Walter M. Mumma	Member of the U.S. House of Representatives from Pennsylvania's 18th congressional district 1953–1960	Succeeded by Douglas H. Elliott
