= Walter M. Mumma =

American politician (1890–1961)

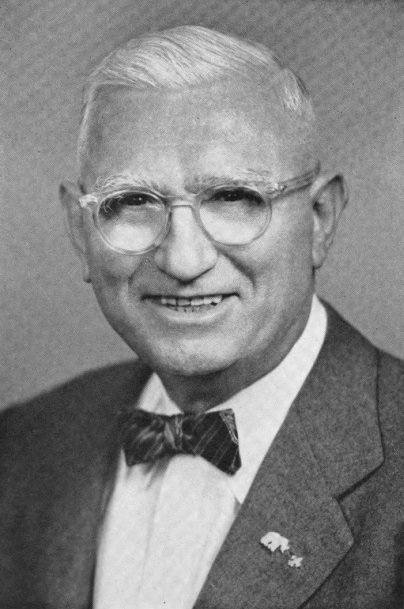
- Frontispiece of 1961's Walter Mann Mumma, Late a Representative

Member of the U.S. House of Representatives from Pennsylvania's 16th district
- In office January 3, 1951 – February 25, 1961
- Preceded by: Samuel K. McConnell Jr.
- Succeeded by: John C. Kunkel
- Constituency: 18th district (1951–1953); 16th district (1953–1961)

Personal details
- Born: November 20, 1890 Steelton, Pennsylvania, U.S.
- Died: February 25, 1961 (aged 70) Bethesda, Maryland, U.S.
- Party: Republican

Walter Mann Mumma (November 20, 1890 – February 25, 1961) was a Republican member of the U.S. House of Representatives from Pennsylvania.

Mumma was born in Steelton. He graduated from the Pennsylvania State Forestry Academy in Mont Alto in 1911. He was employed with the Pennsylvania State Forestry Department from 1911 to 1916.

Mumma worked with the sales department of the Lehigh Portland Cement Company in Allentown, Pennsylvania from 1916 to 1921. He was the organizer, president and manager of the Pennsylvania Supply Company of Harrisburg, from 1921 to 1947, and served as vice president from 1947 to 1951. He served as register of wills for Dauphin County from 1940 to 1944.

Mumma was elected as a Republican to the Eighty-second and to the five succeeding Congresses and served from January 1951 until his death in Bethesda, Maryland. He was interred at East Harrisburg Cemetery. Mumma voted in favor of the Civil Rights Acts of 1957 and 1960.

== See also ==
- List of members of the United States Congress who died in office (1950–1999)

== Sources ==
U.S. House of Representatives
Preceded by John C. Kunkel	Member of the U.S. House of Representatives from Pennsylvania's 18th congressional district 1951–1953	Succeeded by Richard M. Simpson
Preceded by Samuel K. McConnell Jr.	Member of the U.S. House of Representatives from Pennsylvania's 16th congressional district 1953–1961	Succeeded by John C. Kunkel
