= Harlan Mitchell =

American politician

Harlan Erwin Mitchell
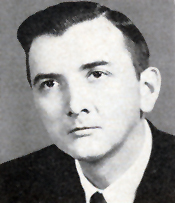

Member of the U.S. House of Representatives from Georgia's 7th district
- In office January 8, 1958 – January 3, 1961
- Preceded by: Henderson Lovelace Lanham
- Succeeded by: John W. Davis

Member of the Georgia Senate
- In office 1961

Personal details
- Born: August 17, 1924 Dalton, Georgia, United States
- Died: September 13, 2011 (aged 87) Dalton, Georgia, US
- Party: Democratic
- Education: The Citadel; University of Georgia School of Law
- Profession: Attorney

Military service
- Branch/service: United States ArmyUnited States Air Force
- Years of service: 1943-1946, 1951-1952
- Rank: First Lieutenant

Harlan Erwin Mitchell, Sr. (August 17, 1924 – September 13, 2011) was a United States representative from Georgia.

== Early years, education, and military service ==
Mitchell was born August 17, 1924, in Dalton, Georgia, the second son of Douglas Wright and Mary Adelia Erwin Mitchell. He graduated from Dalton High School in 1940, at the age of 16. He then attended the Citadel in Charleston, South Carolina, before transferring to the University of Georgia. At age 18, with the onset of WW II, Mitchell volunteered for flight training with the Army Air Corps, serving overseas in the Pacific Theatre. From 1943 through 1946, he served as a first lieutenant in the United States Army Air Corps, engaging in combat, flying P-51's from Iwo Jima to Japan while escorting B-29's on bombing raids as well as participating in fighter strikes against air field, shipping, rail transportation and other strategic targets. He was recalled into service in the United States Air Force, during the Korean War, and served 17 months in 1951 and 1952.

Between his years of service in the two military branches, Mitchell followed in the footsteps of his father, attended the University of Georgia School of Law in Athens and earned LL.B. in 1948. He was admitted to the bar on April 17, 1948, and established a law practiced in Dalton.

== Political service and law career ==
While still in the Air Force, Mitchell ran for the position of Cherokee Judicial Circuit solicitor general, and was elected. He served in that position from January 1, 1953, until December 31, 1956. He was then elected as state's youngest Superior Court judge, at age 31. Serving in that position from January 1, 1957, until January 8, 1958. Upon the death of U.S. Representative Henderson Lovelace Lanham, in November 1957, Mitchell announced his intention to run for Georgia's 7th congressional district. He ran as a Democrat and won the special election to fill Lanham's term in the 85th United States Congress. He won re-election in 1958, but did not seek re-election in 1960. Mitchell was elected to the Georgia State Senate in 1960 and served for one full term.

After his political service, Mitchell returned to his law practice in Dalton, establishing the firm Mitchell and Mitchell with his father, and brother Doug.

== Later years ==
Mitchell continued to practice law and resided in Dalton until just before his death, on September 13, 2011, at the age of 87.

U.S. House of Representatives
Preceded by Henderson Lovelace Lanham	Member of the U.S. House of Representatives from Georgia's 7th congressional district January 8, 1958 – January 3, 1961	Succeeded by John W. Davis
