= Charlesville, Pennsylvania =

Unincorporated community in Pennsylvania, US

- Unincorporated community
- Location within Pennsylvania
- Coordinates: 39°56′55″N 78°30′15″W
- Country: United States
- State: Pennsylvania
- County: Bedford
- Elevation: 1,316 ft (401 m)
- Time zone: UTC-5 (Eastern (EST))
  - Summer (DST): UTC-4 (EDT)
- Area code: 814
- GNIS feature ID: 1203249

Charlesville is an unincorporated community in Bedford County, Pennsylvania, United States.
