= Henderson L. Lanham =

American politician

Henderson Lovelace Lanham
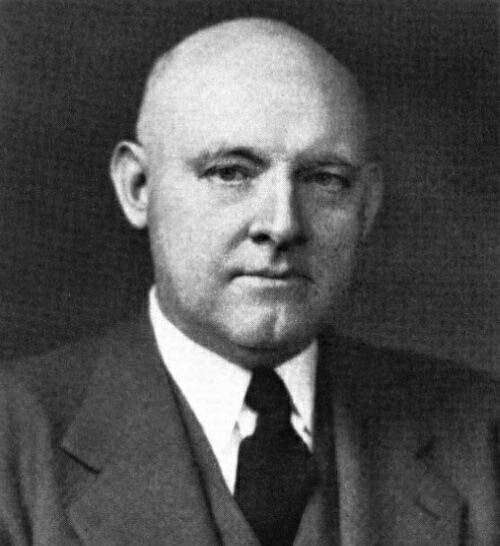
- Frontispiece of 1958's Henderson L. Lanham, Late a Representative

Member of the U.S. House of Representatives from Georgia's 7th district
- In office January 3, 1947 – November 10, 1957
- Preceded by: Malcolm C. Tarver
- Succeeded by: Harlan Erwin Mitchell

Member of the Georgia House of Representatives
- In office 1929–1933; 1937–1940

Personal details
- Born: September 14, 1888 Rome, Georgia, U.S.
- Died: November 10, 1957 (aged 69) Rome, Georgia, U.S.
- Party: Democratic
- Education: University of Georgia; Harvard Graduate School of Arts and Sciences
- Profession: Attorney

Henderson Lovelace Lanham (September 14, 1888 – November 10, 1957) was an American politician and lawyer.

Lanham was born in Rome, Georgia. He attended the University of Georgia in Athens where he was a member of the Sigma Chi fraternity and the Phi Kappa Literary Society. Lanham graduated with a Bachelor of Arts in 1910 and Bachelor of Law degree with honors in 1911. He also graduated from the Harvard Graduate School of Arts and Sciences in 1912.

Lanham served as the chairman of the board of education in Rome in 1918 and 1919. In 1929, he was elected to the Georgia House of Representatives and served until 1933. Lanham was re-elected to that body in 1937 and served until 1940. He was elected as the solicitor general of Rome Judicial Circuit from 1941 to 1946.

In 1946, Lanham captured the Democratic nomination to Georgia’s 7th congressional district, defeating the ten-term incumbent with county unit votes while losing the popular vote. He was elected without Republican opposition to the U.S. House of Representatives until his final election. He remained in the House until his death. In his last two terms he was a member of the Appropriations Committee. He was a rare Southern opponent of the Taft-Hartley Act.

During a Congressional hearing in 1947, Lanham was one of several members of Congress to express concern about the newfound CIA. He asked, "Do you feel there is any danger of the Central Intelligence Agency Division becoming a Gestapo, or anything of that sort?"

A staunch segregationist, in 1956, Lanham signed "The Southern Manifesto." He was cited in the UN petition We Charge Genocide: The Crime of Government Against the Negro People as an example of white supremacy in government, mocking William L. Patterson, whom he referred to as "a God-damned black son-of-bitch", in Congress and stating "We gotta keep the black apes down."

During the hearing, Patterson and Lanham had gotten into a heated exchange:

Patterson: I was fighting for the life of a Negro in Georgia, nine of whom were lynched. Georgia State tried to lynch the Scottsboro Boys—

Lanham: That statement is absolutely false. The state of Georgia has never tried to lynch any Negro.

Patterson: The state of Georgia has lynched—how many? And it is known all over this country, and not only known in this country but all over the world.

Lanham: Let's get this straight. You said the State of Georgia had attempted to lynch nine—[another Congressman briefly spoke]— and there is no excuse for any of them.

Patterson: I accept the correction.

Lanham: I don't speak in defense of any lynching in Georgia of either black or white. But when you say the State of Georgia has attempted to lynch anybody, then you simply lie.

Patterson: Your language—

Lanham: That is the only language that fits it, because I have been a prosecuting attorney in the State of Georgia, and if there is any State in the Union where a Negro gets a fair deal in court, it is in the state of Georgia and any statement to the contrary is absolutely false.

Patterson: The State of Georgia is a State where the black man has no rights comparing to—

Lanham: That is another lie.

Patterson: Yours is a lie, too.

At this, Lanham flew into a rage, rose from his seat, screamed "You black son of a bitch", and attempted to lunge at Patterson. He was held back by two Capitol Police officers. During a subsequent hearing on contempt of Congress charges, which he had pressed against Patterson, Lanham admitted to becoming violent. He told the judge that he "should have used the word Communist instead of black." In 1951, a racially mixed jury deadlocked on Patterson. In 1952, a second jury acquitted him outright.

Lanham was killed in an automobile accident in 1957 in Rome, after his car was struck by a train. He was buried in Myrtle Hill Cemetery in that same city.

== See also ==
- List of members of the United States Congress who died in office (1950–1999)

U.S. House of Representatives
Preceded by Malcolm C. Tarver	Member of the U.S. House of Representatives from Georgia's 7th congressional district January 3, 1947 – November 10, 1957	Succeeded by Harlan Erwin Mitchell
