= Samuel K. McConnell Jr. =

American politician (1901-1985)

Samuel Kerns McConnell Jr.
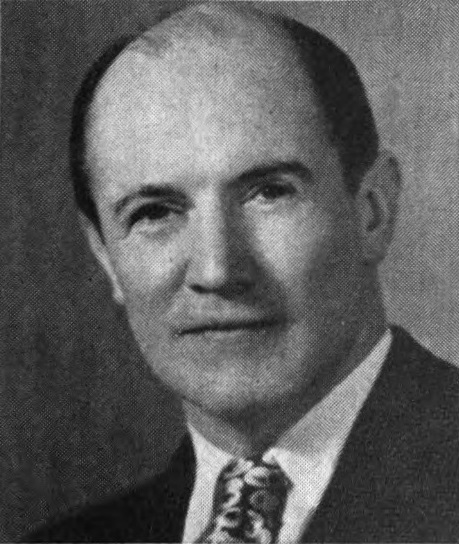

Pennsylvania's 17th congressional district
- In office 1944-1945
- Preceded by: J. William Ditter
- Succeeded by: Richard M. Simpson

Pennsylvania's 16th congressional district
- In office 1945-1953
- Preceded by: Thomas E. Scanlon
- Succeeded by: Walter M. Mumma

Pennsylvania's 13th congressional district
- In office 1953-1957
- Preceded by: George M. Rhodes
- Succeeded by: John A. Lafore Jr.

Personal details
- Born: April 6, 1901 Eddystone, Pennsylvania, U.S.
- Died: April 11, 1985 (aged 84) Bryn Mawr, Pennsylvania, U.S.
- Resting place: West Laurel Hill Cemetery, Bala Cynwyd, Pennsylvania, U.S.
- Party: Republican
- Education: University of Pennsylvania

Samuel Kerns McConnell Jr. (April 6, 1901 – April 11, 1985) was an American politician who served as a Republican member of the United States House of Representatives for Pennsylvania's 17th congressional district from 1944 to 1945, Pennsylvania's 16th congressional district from 1945 to 1953, and Pennsylvania's 13th congressional district from 1953 to 1957.

== Early life and education ==
McConnell was born April 6, 1901, in Eddystone, Pennsylvania. He graduated from the University of Pennsylvania in 1923. He was engaged in the investment banking business in 1926, and was a member of the board of trustees of the Norristown State Hospital, 1939–1944, serving as president, 1940–1944. He served as township commissioner of Lower Merion Township, Pennsylvania, from 1941 to 1944.

== Career ==
McConnell was elected as a Republican to the 78th Congress to fill the vacancy caused by the death of J. William Ditter. He was re-elected to the 79th Congress and to the six succeeding Congresses. He served as chairman of the United States House Committee on Education and Labor during the 83rd Congress. McConnell voted present on the Civil Rights Act of 1957. He resigned on September 1, 1957, to serve as the executive director of United Cerebral Palsy until June 1961. He served as vice president and president of Woodcock, Moyer, Fricke, and French Inc. from 1961 to 1967.

He died April 11, 1985, in Bryn Mawr, Pennsylvania, and was interred at West Laurel Hill Cemetery in Bala Cynwyd, Pennsylvania.

U.S. House of Representatives
Preceded by J. William Ditter	Member of the U.S. House of Representatives from Pennsylvania's 17th congressional district 1944–1945	Succeeded by Richard M. Simpson
Preceded by Thomas E. Scanlon	Member of the U.S. House of Representatives from Pennsylvania's 16th congressional district 1945–1953	Succeeded by Walter M. Mumma
Preceded by George M. Rhodes	Member of the U.S. House of Representatives from Pennsylvania's 13th congressional district 1953–1957	Succeeded by John A. Lafore Jr.
