= Tell Township, Pennsylvania =

Township in Pennsylvania, US

Coordinates: 40.24°N 77.78°W

- Township
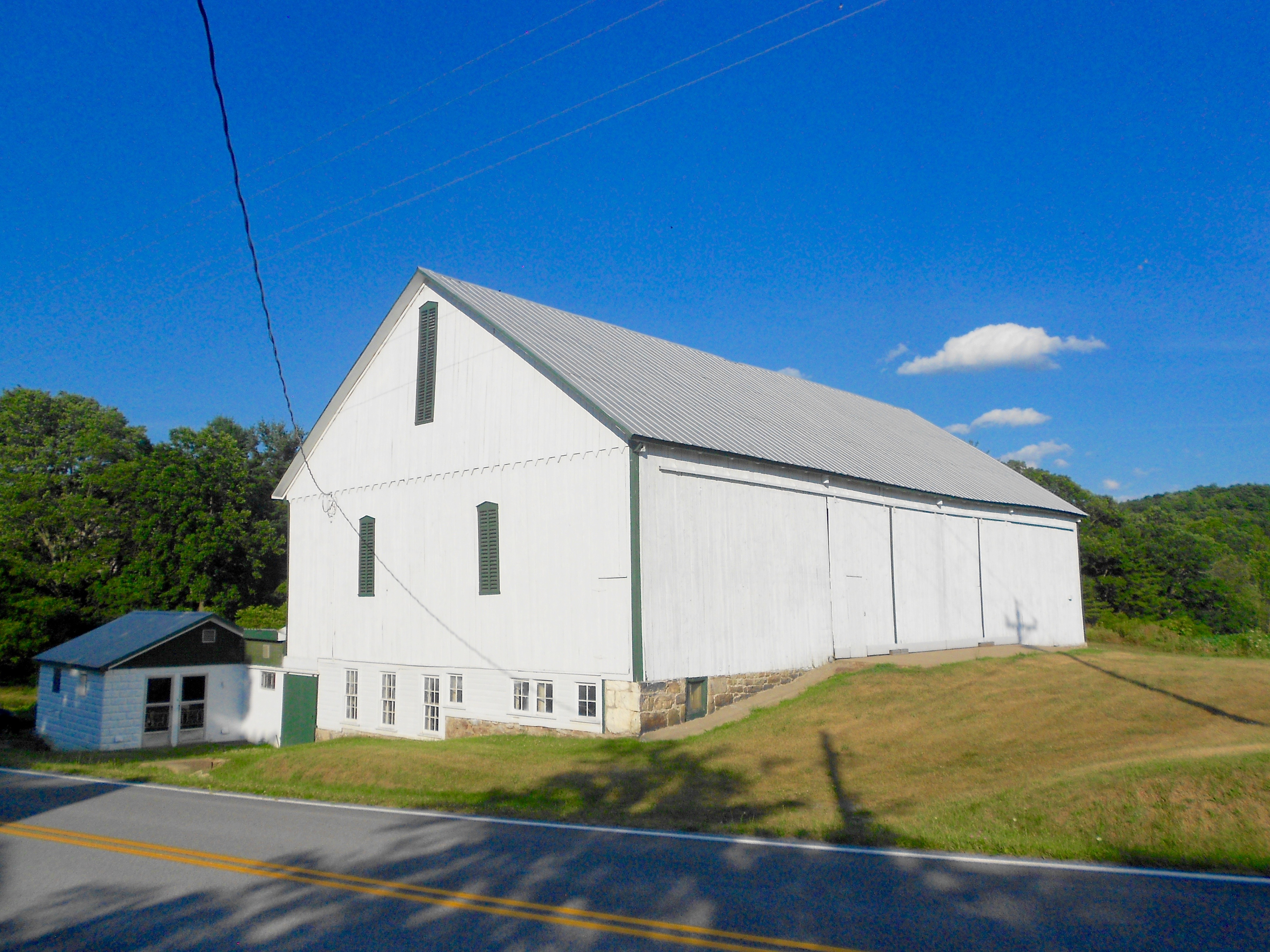
- Barn on PA 35

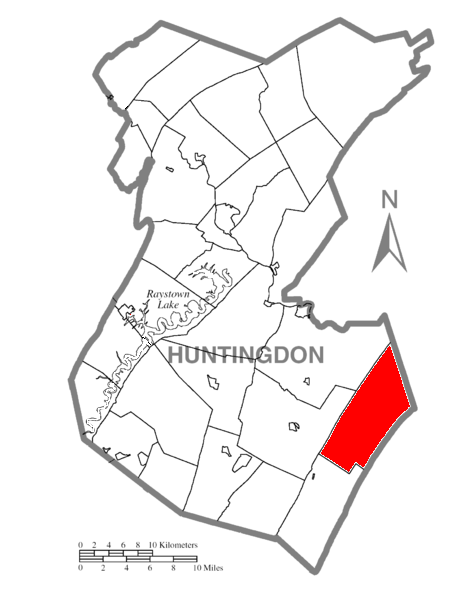
- Map of Huntingdon County, Pennsylvania Highlighting Tell Township

- Map of Huntingdon County, Pennsylvania
- Country: United States
- State: Pennsylvania
- County: Huntingdon

Area
  - Total: 42.64 sq mi (110.45 km^{2})
  - Land: 42.64 sq mi (110.45 km^{2})
  - Water: 0 sq mi (0.00 km^{2})

Population (2020)
  - Total: 550 ▼
  - Estimate (2022): 543
  - Density: 15.1/sq mi (5.82/km^{2})
- Time zone: UTC-5 (Eastern (EST))
  - Summer (DST): UTC-4 (EDT)
- FIPS code: 42-061-76312

Tell Township is a township that is located in Huntingdon County, Pennsylvania, United States. The population was 550 at the time of the 2020 census.

== Geography ==
According to the United States Census Bureau, the township has a total area of 42.5 square miles (110.2 km^{2}), all land.

== Demographics ==
Historical population
Census	Pop.	Note	%±
1970	571		—
1980	604		5.8%
1990	551		−8.8%
2000	648		17.6%
2010	662		2.2%
2020	550		−16.9%
2022 (est.)	543		−1.3%
U.S. Decennial Census

As of the census of 2000, there were 648 people, 238 households, and 179 families residing in the township.

The population density was 15.2 people per square mile (5.9/km^{2}). There were 343 housing units at an average density of 8.1/sq mi (3.1/km^{2}).

The racial make-up of the township was 100.00% White.

There were 238 households, out of which 36.1% had children under the age of eighteen living with them; 64.3% were married couples living together, 7.6% had a female householder with no husband present, and 24.4% were non-families. 23.5% of all households were made up of individuals, and 11.3% had someone living alone who was sixty-five years of age or older.

The average household size was 2.70 and the average family size was 3.17.

Within the township, the population was spread out, with 25.9% of residents who were under the age of eighteen, 8.8% who were aged eighteen to twenty-four, 30.2% who were aged twenty-five to forty-four, 21.5% who were aged forty-five to sixty-four, and 13.6% who were sixty-five years of age or older. The median age was thirty-six years.

For every one hundred females, there were 98.8 males. For every one hundred females who were aged eighteen or older, there were 100.0 males.

The median income for a household in the township was $32,679, and the median income for a family was $39,444. Males had a median income of $34,444 compared with that of $19,375 for females.

The per capita income for the township was $15,832.

Approximately 3.9% of families and 8.5% of the population were living below the poverty line, including 13.9% of those who were under the age of eighteen and 9.0% of those who were aged sixty-five or older.
