= 1964 United States House of Representatives elections =

House elections for the 89th U.S. Congress

- November 3, 1964

All 435 seats in the United States House of Representatives 218 seats needed for a majority
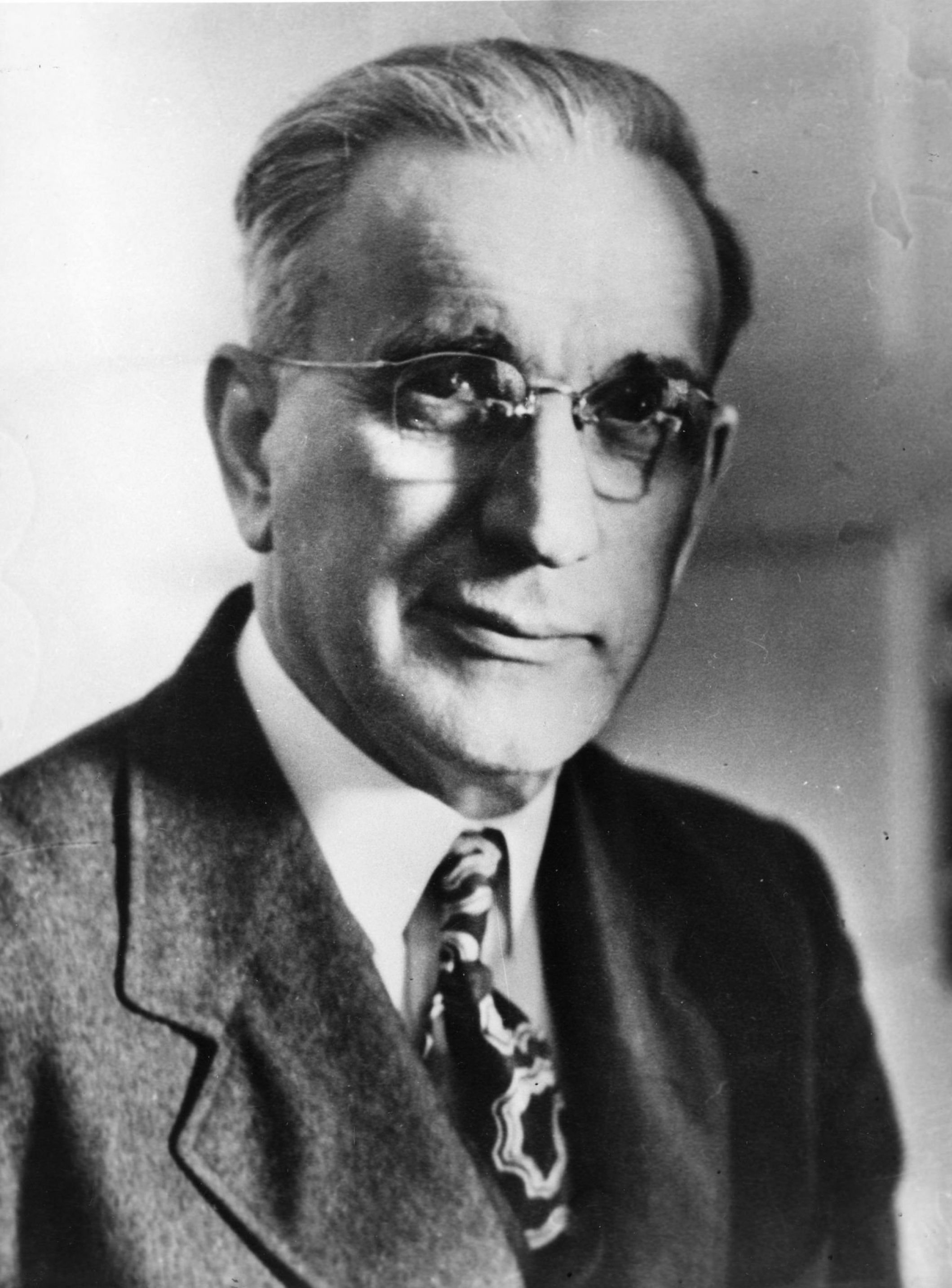

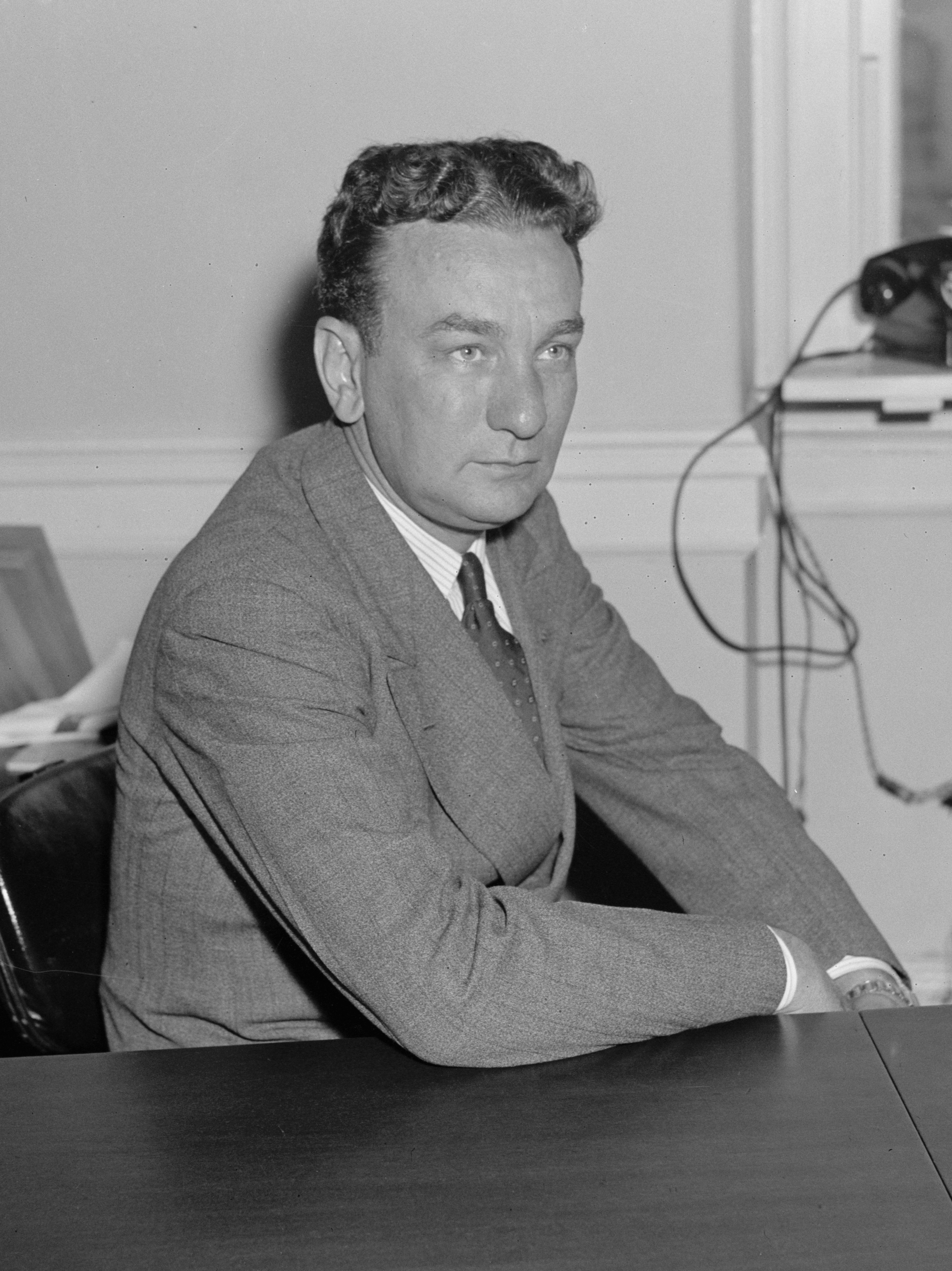
	Majority party	Minority party
Leader	John McCormack	Charles A. Halleck
Party	Democratic	Republican
Leader since	January 10, 1962	January 3, 1959
Leader's seat	Massachusetts 9th	Indiana 2nd
Last election	259 seats	176 seats
Seats won	295	140
Seat change	▲36	▼36
Popular vote	37,643,960	27,916,576
Percentage	57.1%	42.4%
Swing	▲4.7pp	▼4.7pp
- Results: Democratic hold Democratic gain Republican hold Republican gain
Speaker before election
John McCormack
Democratic
Elected Speaker
John McCormack
Democratic

The 1964 United States House of Representatives elections was an election for the United States House of Representatives on November 3, 1964, to elect members to serve in the 89th United States Congress. They coincided with the election to a full term of President Lyndon B. Johnson. Johnson's landslide victory over Barry Goldwater allowed his Democratic Party to gain a net of 36 seats from the Republican Party, giving them a two-thirds majority in the House for the first time since 1936. The election also marked the first time since Reconstruction that Republicans made inroads in the Deep South, with Republicans winning seats in Georgia for the first time since 1874, and Alabama and Mississippi since 1876.

Disappointment over the results caused House Republicans to replace Minority Leader Charles Halleck with future President Gerald R. Ford.

== Overall results ==
397 incumbent members sought reelection, but 8 were defeated in primaries and 45 defeated in the general election for a total of 344 incumbents winning.

↓
295	140
Democratic	Republican

Summary of the November 3, 1964, election results

Parties	Seats				Popular Vote		
Parties	1962	1964	Change	Strength	Vote	%	Change
Democratic Party	259	295	▲36	67.8%	37,643,960	57.1%	▲4.7%
Republican Party	176	140	▼36	32.2%	27,916,576	42.4%	▼4.7%
Liberal Party	0	0	Steady	-	132,497	0.2%	Steady
Independent	0	0	Steady	-	115,403	0.2%	Steady
Conservative Party	0	0	Steady	-	45,665	0.1%	▲0.1%
Socialist Workers Party	0	0	Steady	-	3,710	<0.1%	Steady
United Taxpayers Party	0	0	Steady	-	2,429	<0.1%	Steady
Prohibition Party	0	0	Steady	-	2,238	<0.1%	Steady
National States' Rights Party	0	0	Steady	-	644	<0.1%	Steady
Socialist Labor Party	0	0	Steady	-	76	<0.1%	Steady
Others	0	0	Steady	-	15,988	<0.1%	Steady
Total	435	435	——	100.0%	65,879,186	100.0%	——
Source: Election Statistics - Office of the Clerk

Popular vote
Democratic	57.14%
Republican	42.38%
Others	0.48%

House seats
Democratic	67.82%
Republican	32.18%

=== Maps ===
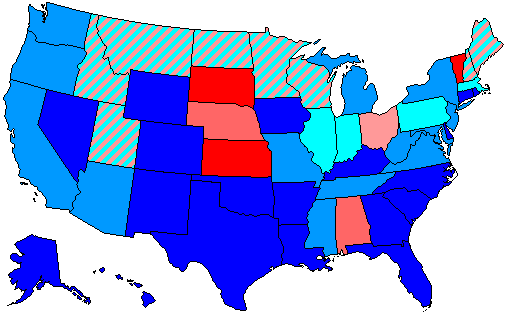
House seats by party holding plurality in state

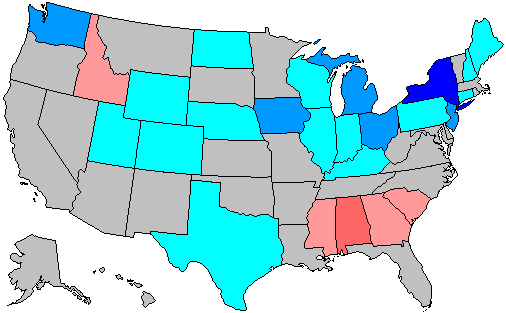
Net Gains by state

District results by vote share

== Southern significance ==
While the GOP performed badly nationally, Goldwater's tremendous success in the Deep South led to the election of several Republicans to the House from those states, many of them the first Republicans elected there since Reconstruction. These "Goldwater Republicans" were elected:

- Glenn Andrews (AL-4)
- John H. Buchanan Jr. (AL-6)
- Bo Callaway (GA-3)
- William L. Dickinson (AL-2)
- Jack Edwards (AL-1)
- James D. Martin (AL-7)
- Prentiss Walker (MS-4)
- Albert Watson (SC-2) (Note: Won the election as a Democrat, then resigned and was elected in special election as a Republican.)

== Special elections ==
District	Incumbent			This race	
District	Member	Party	First elected	Results	Candidates
California 5	John F. Shelley	Democratic	1949 (special)	Incumbent resigned January 7, 1964, to become Mayor of San Francisco. New member elected February 18, 1964. Democratic hold; winner was subsequently re-elected.	▌ ✓ Phillip Burton (Democratic) 53.6%; ▌Nick Verrios (Republican) 25.7%; ▌Tom Flowers (Democratic) 7.7%; ▌Joe Bortin (Democratic) 6.7%; ▌Edward E. Heavey (Democratic) 2.4%; ▌Al J. Quinn (Republican) 1.7%; ▌Bryant McDonald (Republican) 1.6%; ▌Harry Johns (Democratic) 0.6%
Tennessee 2	Howard Baker Sr.	Republican	1950	Incumbent died January 7, 1964. New member elected March 10, 1964 to finish her husband's term. Republican hold; winner did not run for re-election.	▌ ✓ Irene Baker (Republican) 55.5%; ▌Willard Yarborough (Democratic) 43.3%; ▌James R. Porter (Independent) 1.2%
Pennsylvania 5	William J. Green Jr.	Democratic	1944	Incumbent died December 21, 1963. New member elected April 28, 1964 to finish his father's term. Democratic hold; winner was subsequently re-elected.	▌ ✓ William J. Green III (Democratic) 58.6%; ▌Edward M. Rovner (Republican) 41.4%
Missouri 9	Clarence Cannon	Democratic	1922	Incumbent died May 12, 1964. New member elected November 3, 1964. Democratic hold; winner also elected to the next term.	▌ ✓ William L. Hungate (Democratic) 62.5%; ▌Anthony C. Schroeder (Republican) 37.5%
Oregon 1	A. Walter Norblad	Republican	1946 (special)	Incumbent died September 20, 1964. New member elected November 3, 1964. Republican hold; winner also elected to the next term.	▌ ✓ Wendell Wyatt (Republican) 52.8%; ▌R. Blaine Whipple (Democratic) 47.2%
South Carolina 5	Robert W. Hemphill	Democratic	1956	Incumbent resigned May 1, 1964. New member elected November 3, 1964. Democratic hold; winner also elected to the next term.	▌ ✓ Thomas S. Gettys (Democratic) 66.8%; ▌Robert M. Doster (Republican) 33.2%

== Alabama ==
Alabama, which had not agreed on a redistricting plan until 1964 and had elected all members at-large in 1962, went back to electing from districts. While most of the at-large representatives were former district representatives and were thus geographically diverse, the 1st district near Mobile lacked an incumbent, and neither of the incumbents who lived in the 7th district were nominated.

District	Incumbent			This race	
District	Member	Party	First elected	Results	Candidates
Alabama 1	None (district created)			New seat. Republican gain.	▌ ✓ Jack Edwards (Republican) 59.9%; ▌John M. Tyson (Democratic) 40.1%
Alabama 2	George M. Grant; Redistricted from the at-large district	Democratic	1938	Incumbent lost re-election. Republican gain.	▌ ✓ William L. Dickinson (Republican) 61.7%; ▌George M. Grant (Democratic) 36.6%; ▌George Rivers (Independent) 1.7%
Alabama 3	George W. Andrews; Redistricted from the at-large district	Democratic	1944	Incumbent re-elected.	▌ ✓ George W. Andrews (Democratic); Unopposed
Alabama 4	Kenneth A. Roberts; Redistricted from the at-large district	Democratic	1950	Incumbent lost re-election. Republican gain.	▌ ✓ Glenn Andrews (Republican) 58.6%; ▌Kenneth A. Roberts (Democratic) 40.6%; ▌Rod Lumley (Independent) 0.9%
Alabama 5	Armistead I. Selden Jr. Redistricted from the at-large district	Democratic	1952	Incumbent re-elected.	▌ ✓ Armistead I. Selden Jr. (Democratic) 53.0%; ▌Robert French (Republican) 47.0%
Alabama 6	George Huddleston Jr. Redistricted from the at-large district	Democratic	1954	Incumbent lost re-election. Republican gain.	▌ ✓ John H. Buchanan Jr. (Republican) 60.6%; ▌George Huddleston Jr. (Democratic) 39.4%
Alabama 7	Albert Rains; Redistricted from the at-large district	Democratic	1944	Incumbent retired. Republican gain.	▌ ✓ James D. Martin (Republican) 59.6%; ▌George C. Hawkins (Democratic) 40.4%
Alabama 7	Carl Elliott; Redistricted from the at-large district	Democratic	1948	Incumbent lost renomination. Democratic loss.	▌ ✓ James D. Martin (Republican) 59.6%; ▌George C. Hawkins (Democratic) 40.4%
Alabama 8	Robert E. Jones Jr. Redistricted from the at-large district	Democratic	1947 (special)	Incumbent re-elected.	▌ ✓ Robert E. Jones Jr. (Democratic); Unopposed

== Alaska ==
State House Results

District	Incumbent			This race	
District	Member	Party	First elected	Results	Candidates
Alaska at-large	Ralph Rivers	Democratic	1958	Incumbent re-elected.	▌ ✓ Ralph Rivers (Democratic) 51.5%; ▌Lowell Thomas Jr. (Republican) 48.5%

== Arizona ==
District	Incumbent			This race	
District	Member	Party	First elected	Results	Candidates
Arizona 1	John Jacob Rhodes	Republican	1952	Incumbent re-elected.	▌ ✓ John Jacob Rhodes (Republican) 55.3%; ▌John Ahearn (Democratic) 44.7%
Arizona 2	Mo Udall	Democratic	1961 (special)	Incumbent re-elected.	▌ ✓ Mo Udall (Democratic) 58.7%; ▌William E. Kimble (Republican) 41.3%
Arizona 3	George F. Senner Jr.	Democratic	1962	Incumbent re-elected.	▌ ✓ George F. Senner Jr. (Democratic) 51.5%; ▌Sam Steiger (Republican) 48.5%

== Arkansas ==
District	Incumbent			This race	
District	Member	Party	First elected	Results	Candidates
Arkansas 1	Ezekiel C. Gathings	Democratic	1938	Incumbent re-elected.	▌ ✓ Ezekiel C. Gathings (Democratic); Unopposed
Arkansas 2	Wilbur Mills	Democratic	1938	Incumbent re-elected.	▌ ✓ Wilbur Mills (Democratic); Unopposed
Arkansas 3	James William Trimble	Democratic	1944	Incumbent re-elected.	▌ ✓ James William Trimble (Democratic) 54.7%; ▌J. E. Hinshaw (Republican) 45.3%
Arkansas 4	Oren Harris	Democratic	1940	Incumbent re-elected.	▌ ✓ Oren Harris (Democratic); Unopposed

== California ==
District	Incumbent			This race	
District	Member	Party	First elected	Results	Candidates
California 1	Don Clausen	Republican	1963	Incumbent re-elected.	▌ ✓ Don Clausen (Republican) 59.1%; ▌George McCabe (Democratic) 40.9%
California 2	Bizz Johnson	Democratic	1958	Incumbent re-elected.	▌ ✓ Bizz Johnson (Democratic) 64.6%; ▌Chester C. Merriam (Republican) 35.4%
California 3	John E. Moss	Democratic	1952	Incumbent re-elected.	▌ ✓ John E. Moss (Democratic) 74.3%; ▌Einar B. Gjelsteen (Republican) 25.7%
California 4	Robert Leggett	Democratic	1962	Incumbent re-elected.	▌ ✓ Robert Leggett (Democratic) 71.9%; ▌Ivan Norris (Republican) 28.1%
California 5	Phillip Burton	Democratic	1964 (special)	Incumbent re-elected.	▌ ✓ Phillip Burton (Democratic); Unopposed
California 6	William S. Mailliard	Republican	1952	Incumbent re-elected.	▌ ✓ William S. Mailliard (Republican) 63.6%; ▌Thomas P. O'Toole (Democratic) 36.4%
California 7	Jeffery Cohelan	Democratic	1958	Incumbent re-elected.	▌ ✓ Jeffery Cohelan (Democratic) 66.1%; ▌Lawrence E. McNutt (Republican) 33.9%
California 8	George P. Miller	Democratic	1944	Incumbent re-elected.	▌ ✓ George P. Miller (Democratic) 70.3%; ▌Donald E. McKay (Republican) 29.7%
California 9	Don Edwards	Democratic	1962	Incumbent re-elected.	▌ ✓ Don Edwards (Democratic) 69.8%; ▌William P. Hyde (Republican) 30.2%
California 10	Charles Gubser	Republican	1952	Incumbent re-elected.	▌ ✓ Charles Gubser (Republican) 63.1%; ▌E. Day Carman (Democratic) 36.9%
California 11	J. Arthur Younger	Republican	1952	Incumbent re-elected.	▌ ✓ J. Arthur Younger (Republican) 54.8%; ▌W. Mark Sullivan (Democratic) 45.2%
California 12	Burt Talcott	Republican	1962	Incumbent re-elected.	▌ ✓ Burt Talcott (Republican) 61.9%; ▌Sanford Bolz (Democratic) 38.1%
California 13	Charles M. Teague	Republican	1954	Incumbent re-elected.	▌ ✓ Charles M. Teague (Republican) 57.4%; ▌George E. Taylor (Democratic) 42.6%
California 14	John F. Baldwin Jr.	Republican	1954	Incumbent re-elected.	▌ ✓ John F. Baldwin Jr. (Republican) 64.9%; ▌Russell M. Koch (Democratic) 35.1%
California 15	John J. McFall	Democratic	1956	Incumbent re-elected.	▌ ✓ John J. McFall (Democratic) 70.9%; ▌Kenneth Gibson (Republican) 29.1%
California 16	B. F. Sisk	Democratic	1954	Incumbent re-elected.	▌ ✓ B. F. Sisk (Democratic) 66.8%; ▌David T. Harris (Republican) 33.2%
California 17	Cecil R. King	Democratic	1942	Incumbent re-elected.	▌ ✓ Cecil R. King (Democratic) 67.7%; ▌Robert Muncaster (Republican) 32.3%
California 18	Harlan Hagen	Democratic	1952	Incumbent re-elected.	▌ ✓ Harlan Hagen (Democratic) 66.7%; ▌James E. Williams Jr. (Republican) 33.3%
California 19	Chet Holifield	Democratic	1942	Incumbent re-elected.	▌ ✓ Chet Holifield (Democratic) 65.4%; ▌C. Everett Hunt (Republican) 34.6%
California 20	H. Allen Smith	Republican	1956	Incumbent re-elected.	▌ ✓ H. Allen Smith (Republican) 67.9%; ▌C. Bernard Kaufman (Democratic) 32.1%
California 21	Augustus Hawkins	Democratic	1962	Incumbent re-elected.	▌ ✓ Augustus Hawkins (Democratic) 90.3%; ▌Rayfield Lundy (Republican) 9.7%
California 22	James C. Corman	Democratic	1960	Incumbent re-elected.	▌ ✓ James C. Corman (Democratic) 50.5%; ▌Robert C. Cline (Republican) 49.5%
California 23	Del M. Clawson	Republican	1963	Incumbent re-elected.	▌ ✓ Del M. Clawson (Republican) 55.4%; ▌H. O. Van Petten (Democratic) 44.6%
California 24	Glenard P. Lipscomb	Republican	1953	Incumbent re-elected.	▌ ✓ Glenard P. Lipscomb (Republican) 67.9%; ▌Bryan W. Stevens (Democratic) 32.1%
California 25	Ronald B. Cameron	Democratic	1962	Incumbent re-elected.	▌ ✓ Ronald B. Cameron (Democratic) 55.4%; ▌Frank J. Walton (Republican) 44.6%
California 26	James Roosevelt	Democratic	1954	Incumbent re-elected.	▌ ✓ James Roosevelt (Democratic) 70.4%; ▌Gil Seton (Republican) 29.6%
California 27	Everett G. Burkhalter	Democratic	1962	Incumbent retired. Republican gain.	▌ ✓ Edwin Reinecke (Republican) 51.7%; ▌Tom Bane (Democratic) 48.3%
California 28	Alphonzo E. Bell Jr.	Republican	1960	Incumbent re-elected.	▌ ✓ Alphonzo E. Bell Jr. (Republican) 65.6%; ▌Gerald H. Gottlieb (Democratic) 34.4%
California 29	George Brown Jr.	Democratic	1962	Incumbent re-elected.	▌ ✓ George Brown Jr. (Democratic) 58.6%; ▌Charles J. Farrington Jr. (Republican) 41.4%
California 30	Edward R. Roybal	Democratic	1962	Incumbent re-elected.	▌ ✓ Edward R. Roybal (Democratic) 66.3%; ▌Alfred J. Feder (Republican) 33.7%
California 31	Charles H. Wilson	Democratic	1962	Incumbent re-elected.	▌ ✓ Charles H. Wilson (Democratic) 64.0%; ▌Norman G. Shanahan (Republican) 36.0%
California 32	Craig Hosmer	Republican	1952	Incumbent re-elected.	▌ ✓ Craig Hosmer (Republican) 68.9%; ▌Michael Cullen (Democratic) 31.1%
California 33	Harry R. Sheppard	Democratic	1936	Incumbent retired. Democratic hold.	▌ ✓ Kenneth W. Dyal (Democratic) 51.7%; ▌Jerry Pettis (Republican) 48.3%
California 34	Richard T. Hanna	Democratic	1962	Incumbent re-elected.	▌ ✓ Richard T. Hanna (Democratic) 58.3%; ▌Robert A. Geier (Republican) 41.7%
California 35	James B. Utt	Republican	1952	Incumbent re-elected.	▌ ✓ James B. Utt (Republican) 65.0%; ▌Paul B. Carpenter (Democratic) 35.0%
California 36	Bob Wilson	Republican	1952	Incumbent re-elected.	▌ ✓ Bob Wilson (Republican) 59.1%; ▌Quintin Whelan (Democratic) 40.9%
California 37	Lionel Van Deerlin	Democratic	1962	Incumbent re-elected.	▌ ✓ Lionel Van Deerlin (Democratic) 58.2%; ▌Dick Wilson (Republican) 41.8%
California 38	Patrick M. Martin	Republican	1962	Incumbent lost re-election. Democratic gain.	▌ ✓ John V. Tunney (Democratic) 52.8%; ▌Patrick M. Martin (Republican) 47.2%

== Colorado ==
District	Incumbent			This race	
District	Member	Party	First elected	Results	Candidates
Colorado 1	Byron G. Rogers	Democratic	1950	Incumbent re-elected.	▌ ✓ Byron G. Rogers (Democratic) 67.5%; ▌Glenn R. Jones (Republican) 31.9%; ▌Allen D. Taplin (Socialist Workers) 0.6%
Colorado 2	Donald G. Brotzman	Republican	1962	Incumbent lost re-election. Democratic gain.	▌ ✓ Roy H. McVicker (Democratic) 50.6%; ▌Donald G. Brotzman (Republican) 49.4%
Colorado 3	John Chenoweth	Republican	1950	Incumbent lost re-election. Democratic gain.	▌ ✓ Frank Evans (Democratic) 51.2%; ▌John Chenoweth (Republican) 48.8%
Colorado 4	Wayne N. Aspinall	Democratic	1948	Incumbent re-elected.	▌ ✓ Wayne N. Aspinall (Democratic) 63.0%; ▌Edwin S. Lamm (Republican) 37.0%

== Connecticut ==
Connecticut eliminated its at-large seat and redistricted from 5 districts to 6, creating a new district in the northwestern part of the state.

District	Incumbent			This race	
District	Member	Party	First elected	Results	Candidates
Connecticut 1	Emilio Q. Daddario	Democratic	1958	Incumbent re-elected.	▌ ✓ Emilio Q. Daddario (Democratic) 70.0%; ▌James F. Collins (Republican) 30.0%
Connecticut 2	William St. Onge	Democratic	1962	Incumbent re-elected.	▌ ✓ William St. Onge (Democratic) 63.3%; ▌Belton A. Copp (Republican) 36.7%
Connecticut 3	Robert Giaimo	Democratic	1958	Incumbent re-elected.	▌ ✓ Robert Giaimo (Democratic) 63.9%; ▌Bernard J. Burns (Republican) 36.1%
Connecticut 4	Abner W. Sibal	Republican	1960	Incumbent lost re-election. Democratic gain.	▌ ✓ Donald J. Irwin (Democratic) 51.8%; ▌Abner W. Sibal (Republican) 48.2%
Connecticut 5	John S. Monagan	Democratic	1958	Incumbent re-elected.	▌ ✓ John S. Monagan (Democratic) 67.3%; ▌Charles W. Terrell Jr. (Republican) 32.7%
Connecticut 6	Bernard F. Grabowski; Redistricted from at-large	Democratic	1962	Incumbent re-elected.	▌ ✓ Bernard F. Grabowski (Democratic) 58.7%; ▌Thomas Meskill (Republican) 41.3%

== Delaware ==
District	Incumbent			This race	
District	Member	Party	First elected	Results	Candidates
Delaware at-large	Harris McDowell	Democratic	1958	Incumbent re-elected.	▌ ✓ Harris McDowell (Democratic) 56.6%; ▌James H. Snowden (Republican) 43.4%; ▌La Forest (Socialist Labor) 0.04%

== Florida ==
District	Incumbent			This race	
District	Member	Party	First elected	Results	Candidates
Florida 1	Bob Sikes	Democratic	1940; 1944 (resigned); 1944	Incumbent re-elected.	▌ ✓ Bob Sikes (Democratic); Unopposed
Florida 2	Charles E. Bennett	Democratic	1948	Incumbent re-elected.	▌ ✓ Charles E. Bennett (Democratic) 72.7%; ▌William T. Stockton Jr. (Republican) 27.3%
Florida 3	Claude Pepper	Democratic	1962	Incumbent re-elected.	▌ ✓ Claude Pepper (Democratic) 65.7%; ▌Paul J. O'Neill (Republican) 34.3%
Florida 4	Dante Fascell	Democratic	1954	Incumbent re-elected.	▌ ✓ Dante Fascell (Democratic) 63.9%; ▌Jay McGlon (Republican) 36.1%
Florida 5	Syd Herlong	Democratic	1948	Incumbent re-elected.	▌ ✓ Syd Herlong (Democratic); Unopposed
Florida 6	Paul Rogers	Democratic	1954	Incumbent re-elected.	▌ ✓ Paul Rogers (Democratic) 66.0%; ▌John D. Steele (Republican) 34.0%
Florida 7	James A. Haley	Democratic	1952	Incumbent re-elected.	▌ ✓ James A. Haley (Democratic); Unopposed
Florida 8	D. R. Matthews	Democratic	1952	Incumbent re-elected.	▌ ✓ D. R. Matthews (Democratic); Unopposed
Florida 9	Don Fuqua	Democratic	1962	Incumbent re-elected.	▌ ✓ Don Fuqua (Democratic); Unopposed
Florida 10	Sam Gibbons	Democratic	1962	Incumbent re-elected.	▌ ✓ Sam Gibbons (Democratic); Unopposed
Florida 11	Edward Gurney	Republican	1962	Incumbent re-elected.	▌ ✓ Edward Gurney (Republican) 60.6%; ▌Thomas S. Kenney (Democratic) 39.4%
Florida 12	William C. Cramer	Republican	1954	Incumbent re-elected.	▌ ✓ William C. Cramer (Republican) 60.6%; ▌F. Marion Harrelson (Democratic) 39.4%

== Georgia ==
Georgia redistricted its existing 10 districts, dividing the Atlanta-area 5th district into a 4th and 5th district, renumbering the existing 4th district to the 6th, and dividing the existing central Georgia 6th district up between its neighbors with compensating boundary changes elsewhere.

District	Incumbent			This race	
District	Member	Party	First elected	Results	Candidates
Georgia 1	G. Elliott Hagan	Democratic	1960	Incumbent re-elected.	▌ ✓ G. Elliott Hagan (Democratic) 72.3%; ▌Milton Lent (Independent) 27.7%
Georgia 2	J. L. Pilcher	Democratic	1953	Incumbent retired. Democratic hold.	▌ ✓ Maston E. O'Neal Jr. (Democratic); Unopposed
Georgia 3	Tic Forrester	Democratic	1950	Incumbent retired. Republican gain.	▌ ✓ Bo Callaway (Republican) 57.2%; ▌Garland T. Byrd (Democratic) 42.8%
Georgia 4	None (district created)			New seat. Democratic gain.	▌ ✓ James MacKay (Democratic) 56.9%; ▌Roscoe Pickett (Republican) 43.1%
Georgia 5	Charles L. Weltner	Democratic	1962	Incumbent re-elected.	▌ ✓ Charles L. Weltner (Democratic) 54.0%; ▌L. J. O'Callaghan (Republican) 46.0%
Georgia 6	John Flynt; Redistricted from 4th	Democratic	1954	Incumbent re-elected.	▌ ✓ John Flynt (Democratic); Unopposed
Georgia 7	John William Davis	Democratic	1960	Incumbent re-elected.	▌ ✓ John William Davis (Democratic) 54.7%; ▌Edward Y. Chapin (Republican) 45.3%
Georgia 8	J. Russell Tuten	Democratic	1962	Incumbent re-elected.	▌ ✓ J. Russell Tuten (Democratic); Unopposed
Georgia 9	Phillip M. Landrum	Democratic	1952	Incumbent re-elected.	▌ ✓ Phillip M. Landrum (Democratic) 60.5%; ▌Jack Prince (Democratic) 39.5%
Georgia 10	Robert Grier Stephens Jr.	Democratic	1960	Incumbent re-elected.	▌ ✓ Robert Grier Stephens Jr. (Democratic); Unopposed
Georgia 10	Carl Vinson; Redistricted from 6th	Democratic	1914	Incumbent retired. Democratic loss.	▌ ✓ Robert Grier Stephens Jr. (Democratic); Unopposed

== Hawaii ==
District	Incumbent			This race	
District	Member	Party	First elected	Results	Candidates
Hawaii at-large	Spark Matsunaga	Democratic	1962	Incumbent re-elected.	▌ ✓ Spark Matsunaga (Democratic) 35.7%; ▌ ✓ Patsy Mink (Democratic) 27.2%; ▌John E. Milligan (Republican) 22.8%; ▌Richard Ike Sutton (Republican) 14.3%
Hawaii at-large	Thomas Gill	Democratic	1962	Incumbent retired to run for U.S. Senator. Democratic hold.	▌ ✓ Spark Matsunaga (Democratic) 35.7%; ▌ ✓ Patsy Mink (Democratic) 27.2%; ▌John E. Milligan (Republican) 22.8%; ▌Richard Ike Sutton (Republican) 14.3%

== Idaho ==
District	Incumbent			This race	
District	Member	Party	First elected	Results	Candidates
Idaho 1	Compton I. White Jr.	Democratic	1962	Incumbent re-elected.	▌ ✓ Compton I. White Jr. (Democratic) 51.7%; ▌John Mattmiller (Republican) 48.3%
Idaho 2	Ralph R. Harding	Democratic	1960	Incumbent lost re-election. Republican gain.	▌ ✓ George V. Hansen (Republican) 52.2%; ▌Ralph R. Harding (Democratic) 47.8%

== Illinois ==
District	Incumbent			This race	
District	Member	Party	First elected	Results	Candidates
Illinois 1	William L. Dawson	Democratic	1942	Incumbent re-elected.	▌ ✓ William L. Dawson (Democratic) 84.9%; ▌Wilbur N. Daniel (Republican) 15.1%
Illinois 2	Barratt O'Hara	Democratic	1948; 1950 (lost); 1952	Incumbent re-elected.	▌ ✓ Barratt O'Hara (Democratic) 67.3%; ▌William F. Scannell (Republican) 32.7%
Illinois 3	William T. Murphy	Democratic	1958	Incumbent re-elected.	▌ ✓ William T. Murphy (Democratic) 59.1%; ▌Emmet Byrne (Republican) 40.9%
Illinois 4	Ed Derwinski	Republican	1958	Incumbent re-elected.	▌ ✓ Ed Derwinski (Republican) 58.9%; ▌Ray J. Rybacki (Democratic) 41.1%
Illinois 5	John C. Kluczynski	Democratic	1950	Incumbent re-elected.	▌ ✓ John C. Kluczynski (Democratic) 63.7%; ▌Robert V. Kotowski (Republican) 36.3%
Illinois 6	Thomas J. O'Brien	Democratic	1942	Incumbent died in office. Democratic hold.	▌ ✓ Daniel J. Ronan (Democratic) 83.4%; ▌Joseph W. Halac (Republican) 16.6%
Illinois 7	Roland V. Libonati	Democratic	1957	Incumbent retired. Democratic hold.	▌ ✓ Frank Annunzio (Democratic) 85.9%; ▌Ray Wolfram (Republican) 14.1%
Illinois 8	Dan Rostenkowski	Democratic	1958	Incumbent re-elected.	▌ ✓ Dan Rostenkowski (Democratic) 66.1%; ▌Eugene L. Ebrom (Republican) 33.9%
Illinois 9	Edward Rowan Finnegan	Democratic	1960	Incumbent retired. Democratic hold.	▌ ✓ Sidney R. Yates (Democratic) 63.9%; ▌Robert S. Decker (Republican) 36.1%
Illinois 10	Harold R. Collier	Republican	1956	Incumbent re-elected.	▌ ✓ Harold R. Collier (Republican) 60.8%; ▌Thomas E. Gause (Democratic) 39.2%
Illinois 11	Roman Pucinski	Democratic	1958	Incumbent re-elected.	▌ ✓ Roman Pucinski (Democratic) 56.9%; ▌Chester T. Podgorski (Republican) 43.1%
Illinois 12	Robert McClory	Republican	1962	Incumbent re-elected.	▌ ✓ Robert McClory (Republican) 58.6%; ▌John C. Kimball (Democratic) 41.4%
Illinois 13	Donald Rumsfeld	Republican	1962	Incumbent re-elected.	▌ ✓ Donald Rumsfeld (Republican) 57.8%; ▌Lynn A. Williams (Democratic) 42.2%
Illinois 14	Elmer J. Hoffman	Republican	1958	Incumbent retired. Republican hold.	▌ ✓ John N. Erlenborn (Republican) 59.0%; ▌Jerome M. Ziegler (Democratic) 41.0%
Illinois 15	Charlotte Thompson Reid	Republican	1962	Incumbent re-elected.	▌ ✓ Charlotte Thompson Reid (Republican) 58.4%; ▌Poppy X. Mitchell (Democratic) 41.6%
Illinois 16	John B. Anderson	Republican	1960	Incumbent re-elected.	▌ ✓ John B. Anderson (Republican) 56.4%; ▌Robert E. Brinkmeier (Democratic) 43.6%
Illinois 17	Leslie C. Arends	Republican	1934	Incumbent re-elected.	▌ ✓ Leslie C. Arends (Republican) 56.4%; ▌Bernard J. Hughes (Democratic) 43.6%
Illinois 18	Robert H. Michel	Republican	1956	Incumbent re-elected.	▌ ✓ Robert H. Michel (Republican) 54.0%; ▌Edward P. Kohlbacher (Democratic) 46.0%
Illinois 19	Robert T. McLoskey	Republican	1962	Incumbent lost re-election. Democratic gain.	▌ ✓ Gale Schisler (Democratic) 52.4%; ▌Robert T. McLoskey (Republican) 47.6%
Illinois 20	Paul Findley	Republican	1960	Incumbent re-elected.	▌ ✓ Paul Findley (Republican) 54.8%; ▌Lester E. Collins (Democratic) 45.2%
Illinois 21	Kenneth J. Gray	Democratic	1954	Incumbent re-elected.	▌ ✓ Kenneth J. Gray (Democratic) 65.0%; ▌Stillman J. Stanard (Republican) 35.0%
Illinois 22	William L. Springer	Republican	1950	Incumbent re-elected.	▌ ✓ William L. Springer (Republican) 53.0%; ▌John J. Desmond (Democratic) 47.0%
Illinois 23	George E. Shipley	Democratic	1958	Incumbent re-elected.	▌ ✓ George E. Shipley (Democratic) 54.6%; ▌Wayne S. Jones (Republican) 45.4%
Illinois 24	Melvin Price	Democratic	1944	Incumbent re-elected.	▌ ✓ Melvin Price (Democratic) 75.7%; ▌G. S. Mirza (Republican) 24.3%

== Indiana ==
District	Incumbent			This race	
District	Member	Party	First elected	Results	Candidates
Indiana 1	Ray Madden	Democratic	1942	Incumbent re-elected.	▌ ✓ Ray Madden (Democratic) 63.7%; ▌Arthur F. Endres (Republican) 36.0%; ▌Raymond E. Brechner (Prohibition) 0.4%
Indiana 2	Charles A. Halleck	Republican	1935	Incumbent re-elected.	▌ ✓ Charles A. Halleck (Republican) 52.9%; ▌John C. Raber (Democratic) 47.1%
Indiana 3	John Brademas	Democratic	1958	Incumbent re-elected.	▌ ✓ John Brademas (Democratic) 60.6%; ▌Robert L. Miller (Republican) 39.4%
Indiana 4	E. Ross Adair	Republican	1950	Incumbent re-elected.	▌ ✓ E. Ross Adair (Republican) 52.1%; ▌Max E. Hobbs (Democratic) 47.9%
Indiana 5	J. Edward Roush	Democratic	1958	Incumbent re-elected.	▌ ✓ J. Edward Roush (Democratic) 55.2%; ▌John R. Feighner (Republican) 44.8%
Indiana 6	Richard L. Roudebush	Republican	1960	Incumbent re-elected.	▌ ✓ Richard L. Roudebush (Republican) 54.1%; ▌Karl O'Lessker (Democratic) 45.9%
Indiana 7	William G. Bray	Republican	1950	Incumbent re-elected.	▌ ✓ William G. Bray (Republican) 54.2%; ▌Elden C. Tipton (Democratic) 45.8%
Indiana 8	Winfield K. Denton	Democratic	1954	Incumbent re-elected.	▌ ✓ Winfield K. Denton (Democratic) 56.5%; ▌Roger H. Zion (Republican) 43.5%
Indiana 9	Earl Wilson	Republican	1960	Incumbent lost re-election. Democratic gain.	▌ ✓ Lee Hamilton (Democratic) 54.4%; ▌Earl Wilson (Republican) 45.6%
Indiana 10	Ralph Harvey	Republican	1960	Incumbent re-elected.	▌ ✓ Ralph Harvey (Republican) 50.4%; ▌Russell E. Davis (Democratic) 49.6%
Indiana 11	Donald C. Bruce	Republican	1960	Incumbent retired to run for U.S. Senator. Democratic gain.	▌ ✓ Andrew Jacobs Jr. (Democratic) 50.5%; ▌Don A. Tabbert (Republican) 49.5%

== Iowa ==
District	Incumbent			This race	
District	Member	Party	First elected	Results	Candidates
Iowa 1	Fred Schwengel	Republican	1954	Incumbent lost re-election. Democratic gain.	▌ ✓ John R. Schmidhauser (Democratic) 51.0%; ▌Fred Schwengel (Republican) 48.9%; ▌Tracy M. Gore (Conservative) 0.10%
Iowa 2	James E. Bromwell	Republican	1960	Incumbent lost re-election. Democratic gain.	▌ ✓ John Culver (Democratic) 52.2%; ▌James E. Bromwell (Republican) 47.8%
Iowa 3	H. R. Gross	Republican	1948	Incumbent re-elected.	▌ ✓ H. R. Gross (Republican) 50.1%; ▌Stephen M. Peterson (Democratic) 49.9%
Iowa 4	John Henry Kyl	Republican	1959 (special)	Incumbent lost re-election. Democratic gain.	▌ ✓ Bert Bandstra (Democratic) 53.6%; ▌John Henry Kyl (Republican) 46.4%
Iowa 5	Neal Smith	Democratic	1958	Incumbent re-elected.	▌ ✓ Neal Smith (Democratic) 69.6%; ▌Benjamin J. Gibson Jr. (Republican) 29.7%; ▌Albert A. Payne (Conservative) 0.7%
Iowa 6	Charles B. Hoeven	Republican	1942	Incumbent retired. Democratic gain.	▌ ✓ Stanley L. Greigg (Democratic) 53.2%; ▌Howard N. Sokol (Republican) 46.5%; ▌Lee E. Smith (Conservative) 0.3%
Iowa 7	Ben F. Jensen	Republican	1938	Incumbent lost re-election. Democratic gain.	▌ ✓ John R. Hansen (Democratic) 53.5%; ▌Ben F. Jensen (Republican) 46.5%

== Kansas ==
District	Incumbent			This race	
District	Member	Party	First elected	Results	Candidates
Kansas 1	Bob Dole	Republican	1960	Incumbent re-elected.	▌ ✓ Bob Dole (Republican) 51.2%; ▌Bill Bork (Democratic) 48.8%
Kansas 2	William H. Avery	Republican	1954	Incumbent retired to run for governor. Republican hold.	▌ ✓ Chester L. Mize (Republican) 51.1%; ▌John Montgomery (Democratic) 48.9%
Kansas 3	Robert Ellsworth	Republican	1960	Incumbent re-elected.	▌ ✓ Robert Ellsworth (Republican) 62.2%; ▌A. Clayton Dial (Democratic) 37.8%
Kansas 4	Garner E. Shriver	Republican	1960	Incumbent re-elected.	▌ ✓ Garner E. Shriver (Republican) 59.4%; ▌Jack Glaves (Democratic) 40.6%
Kansas 5	Joe Skubitz	Republican	1962	Incumbent re-elected.	▌ ✓ Joe Skubitz (Republican) 56.4%; ▌Reb. Russell (Democratic) 43.6%

== Kentucky ==
District	Incumbent			This race	
District	Member	Party	First elected	Results	Candidates
Kentucky 1	Frank Stubblefield	Democratic	1958	Incumbent re-elected.	▌ ✓ Frank Stubblefield (Democratic); Unopposed
Kentucky 2	William Natcher	Democratic	1953 (special)	Incumbent re-elected.	▌ ✓ William Natcher (Democratic) 68.4%; ▌Rhodes Bratcher (Republican) 31.6%
Kentucky 3	Gene Snyder	Republican	1962	Incumbent lost re-election. Democratic gain.	▌ ✓ Charles R. Farnsley (Democratic) 53.8%; ▌Gene Snyder (Republican) 46.2%
Kentucky 4	Frank Chelf	Democratic	1944	Incumbent re-elected.	▌ ✓ Frank Chelf (Democratic) 61.7%; ▌Clyde Middleton (Republican) 38.3%
Kentucky 5	Eugene Siler	Republican	1954	Incumbent retired. Republican hold.	▌ ✓ Tim Lee Carter (Republican) 53.1%; ▌Frances J. Mills (Democratic) 46.9%
Kentucky 6	John C. Watts	Democratic	1951 (special)	Incumbent re-elected.	▌ ✓ John C. Watts (Democratic) 70.6%; ▌John W. Swope (Republican) 29.4%
Kentucky 7	Carl D. Perkins	Democratic	1948	Incumbent re-elected.	▌ ✓ Carl D. Perkins (Democratic) 69.7%; ▌Walter Clay Van Hoose (Republican) 30.3%

== Louisiana ==
District	Incumbent			This race	
District	Member	Party	First elected	Results	Candidates
Louisiana 1	F. Edward Hébert	Democratic	1940	Incumbent re-elected.	▌ ✓ F. Edward Hébert (Democratic); Unopposed
Louisiana 2	Hale Boggs	Democratic	1940; 1942 (lost); 1946	Incumbent re-elected.	▌ ✓ Hale Boggs (Democratic) 55.0%; ▌David C. Treen (Republican) 45.0%
Louisiana 3	Edwin E. Willis	Democratic	1948	Incumbent re-elected.	▌ ✓ Edwin E. Willis (Democratic) 62.3%; ▌Robert F. Angers (Republican) 37.7%
Louisiana 4	Joe Waggonner	Democratic	1961	Incumbent re-elected.	▌ ✓ Joe Waggonner (Democratic); Unopposed
Louisiana 5	Otto Passman	Democratic	1946	Incumbent re-elected.	▌ ✓ Otto Passman (Democratic); Unopposed
Louisiana 6	James H. Morrison	Democratic	1942	Incumbent re-elected.	▌ ✓ James H. Morrison (Democratic) 62.9%; ▌Floyd O. Crawford (Republican) 37.1%
Louisiana 7	T. Ashton Thompson	Democratic	1952	Incumbent re-elected.	▌ ✓ T. Ashton Thompson (Democratic); Unopposed
Louisiana 8	Gillis William Long	Democratic	1962	Incumbent lost renomination. Democratic hold.	▌ ✓ Speedy Long (Democratic) 54.5%; ▌William S. Walker (Republican) 45.5%

== Maine ==
District	Incumbent			This race	
District	Member	Party	First elected	Results	Candidates
Maine 1	Stanley R. Tupper	Republican	1960	Incumbent re-elected.	▌ ✓ Stanley R. Tupper (Republican) 50.1%; ▌Kenneth M. Curtis (Democratic) 49.9%
Maine 2	Clifford McIntire	Republican	1951	Incumbent retired to run for U.S. Senator. Democratic gain.	▌ ✓ William Hathaway (Democratic) 62.0%; ▌Kenneth P. MacLeod (Republican) 38.0%

== Maryland ==
District	Incumbent			This race	
District	Member	Party	First elected	Results	Candidates
Maryland 1	Rogers Morton	Republican	1962	Incumbent re-elected.	▌ ✓ Rogers Morton (Republican) 53.1%; ▌Harry Hughes (Democratic) 46.9%
Maryland 2	Clarence Long	Democratic	1962	Incumbent re-elected.	▌ ✓ Clarence Long (Democratic) 65.9%; ▌George A. Price (Republican) 34.1%
Maryland 3	Edward Garmatz	Democratic	1947	Incumbent re-elected.	▌ ✓ Edward Garmatz (Democratic); Unopposed
Maryland 4	George Hyde Fallon	Democratic	1944	Incumbent re-elected.	▌ ✓ George Hyde Fallon (Democratic) 77.8%; ▌Charles O'Donovan Evans (Republican) 22.2%
Maryland 5	Richard Lankford	Democratic	1954	Incumbent retired. Democratic hold.	▌ ✓ Hervey Machen (Democratic) 61.0%; ▌Edward A. Potts (Republican) 39.0%
Maryland 6	Charles Mathias	Republican	1960	Incumbent re-elected.	▌ ✓ Charles Mathias (Republican) 54.5%; ▌Royce Hanson (Democratic) 45.5%
Maryland 7	Samuel Friedel	Democratic	1952	Incumbent re-elected.	▌ ✓ Samuel Friedel (Democratic) 79.5%; ▌Thomas C. Hofstetter (Republican) 20.5%
Maryland at-large	Carlton R. Sickles	Democratic	1962	Incumbent re-elected.	▌ ✓ Carlton R. Sickles (Democratic) 69.4%; ▌David Scull (Republican) 30.6%

== Massachusetts ==
District	Incumbent			This race	
District	Member	Party	First elected	Results	Candidates
Massachusetts 1	Silvio O. Conte	Republican	1958	Incumbent re-elected.	▌ ✓ Silvio O. Conte (Republican); Unopposed
Massachusetts 2	Edward Boland	Democratic	1952	Incumbent re-elected.	▌ ✓ Edward Boland (Democratic); Unopposed
Massachusetts 3	Philip J. Philbin	Democratic	1942	Incumbent re-elected.	▌ ✓ Philip J. Philbin (Democratic); Unopposed
Massachusetts 4	Harold Donohue	Democratic	1946	Incumbent re-elected.	▌ ✓ Harold Donohue (Democratic) 71.8%; ▌Dudley B. Dumaine (Republican) 28.2%
Massachusetts 5	F. Bradford Morse	Republican	1960	Incumbent re-elected.	▌ ✓ F. Bradford Morse (Republican) 65.0%; ▌George W. Arvanitis (Democratic) 35.0%
Massachusetts 6	William H. Bates	Republican	1950	Incumbent re-elected.	▌ ✓ William H. Bates (Republican) 64.6%; ▌James G. Zafris Jr. (Democratic) 35.4%
Massachusetts 7	Torbert Macdonald	Democratic	1954	Incumbent re-elected.	▌ ✓ Torbert Macdonald (Democratic) 76.9%; ▌Gordon F. Hughes (Republican) 23.1%
Massachusetts 8	Tip O'Neill	Democratic	1952	Incumbent re-elected.	▌ ✓ Tip O'Neill (Democratic); Unopposed
Massachusetts 9	John W. McCormack	Democratic	1928	Incumbent re-elected.	▌ ✓ John W. McCormack (Democratic) 80.3%; ▌Jack E. Molesworth (Republican) 14.6%; ▌Noel A. Day (Independent) 5.0%
Massachusetts 10	Joseph W. Martin Jr.	Republican	1924	Incumbent re-elected.	▌ ✓ Joseph W. Martin Jr. (Republican) 63.0%; ▌Edward F. Doolan (Democratic) 37.0%
Massachusetts 11	James A. Burke	Democratic	1958	Incumbent re-elected.	▌ ✓ James A. Burke (Democratic); Unopposed
Massachusetts 12	Hastings Keith	Republican	1958	Incumbent re-elected.	▌ ✓ Hastings Keith (Republican) 59.6%; ▌Alexander Byron (Democratic) 40.4%

== Michigan ==
Michigan redistricted, converting its at-large seat into a 19th district and realigning the other districts to account for population growth in the Detroit suburbs. Two Democratic seats and one Republican seat were eliminated or combined at redistricting, but the defeat of three Republican incumbents and the election of Democrats to all the new seats yielded a net shift of four seats, changing the party balance from 11–8 Republican to 12–7 Democratic.

District	Incumbent			This race	
District	Member	Party	First elected	Results	Candidates
Michigan 1	None (district created)			New seat. Democratic gain.	▌ ✓ John Conyers Jr. (Democratic) 83.6%; ▌Robert B. Blackwell (Republican) 15.5%; ▌Milton R. Henry (Freedom Now) 0.9%
Michigan 2	George Meader	Republican	1950	Incumbent lost re-election. Democratic gain.	▌ ✓ Weston E. Vivian (Democratic) 50.4%; ▌George Meader (Republican) 49.4%; ▌Peter Signerelli (Socialist Workers) 0.1%
Michigan 3	August E. Johansen	Republican	1954	Incumbent lost re-election. Democratic gain.	▌ ✓ Paul H. Todd Jr. (Democratic) 52.7%; ▌August E. Johansen (Republican) 47.3%
Michigan 4	J. Edward Hutchinson	Republican	1962	Incumbent re-elected.	▌ ✓ J. Edward Hutchinson (Republican) 54.3%; ▌Russell W. Holcomb (Democratic) 45.7%
Michigan 5	Gerald Ford	Republican	1948	Incumbent re-elected.	▌ ✓ Gerald Ford (Republican) 61.2%; ▌William G. Reamon (Democratic) 38.8%
Michigan 6	Charles E. Chamberlain	Republican	1956	Incumbent re-elected.	▌ ✓ Charles E. Chamberlain (Republican) 56.6%; ▌Boyd K. Benedict (Democratic) 43.4%
Michigan 7	None (district created)			New seat. Democratic gain.	▌ ✓ John C. Mackie (Democratic) 65.7%; ▌Claude E. Sadler (Republican) 34.3%
Michigan 8	R. James Harvey	Republican	1960	Incumbent re-elected.	▌ ✓ R. James Harvey (Republican) 54.7%; ▌Sanford A. Brown (Democratic) 45.3%
Michigan 9	Robert P. Griffin	Republican	1956	Incumbent re-elected.	▌ ✓ Robert P. Griffin (Republican) 57.4%; ▌Daniel Griffen (Democratic) 42.6%
Michigan 10	Al Cederberg	Republican	1952	Incumbent re-elected.	▌ ✓ Al Cederberg (Republican) 56.6%; ▌Hubert C. Evans (Democratic) 43.4%
Michigan 11	Victor A. Knox	Republican	1952	Incumbent lost re-election. Democratic gain.	▌ ✓ Raymond F. Clevenger (Democratic) 53.3%; ▌Victor A. Knox (Republican) 46.7%
Michigan 11	John B. Bennett; Redistricted from 12th	Republican	1946	Incumbent died August 9, 1964. Republican loss.	▌ ✓ Raymond F. Clevenger (Democratic) 53.3%; ▌Victor A. Knox (Republican) 46.7%
Michigan 12	James G. O'Hara; Redistricted from 7th	Democratic	1958	Incumbent re-elected.	▌ ✓ James G. O'Hara (Democratic) 74.8%; ▌Robert G. Powell (Republican) 25.2%
Michigan 13	Charles Diggs	Democratic	1954	Incumbent re-elected.	▌ ✓ Charles Diggs (Democratic) 85.8%; ▌Bruce Watson (Republican) 13.9%; ▌Richard T. David (Socialist Workers) 0.3%
Michigan 14	Harold M. Ryan	Democratic	1962	Incumbent lost renomination. Democratic loss.	▌ ✓ Lucien Nedzi (Democratic) 66.9%; ▌George Bashara (Republican) 33.1%
Michigan 14	Lucien Nedzi; Redistricted from 1st	Democratic	1961	Incumbent re-elected.	▌ ✓ Lucien Nedzi (Democratic) 66.9%; ▌George Bashara (Republican) 33.1%
Michigan 15	None (district created)			New seat. Democratic gain.	▌ ✓ William D. Ford (Democratic) 71.0%; ▌John F. Fellrath Jr. (Republican) 29.0%
Michigan 16	John Lesinski Jr.	Democratic	1950	Incumbent lost renomination. Democratic loss.	▌ ✓ John Dingell (Democratic) 73.4%; ▌Raymond B. Eonard (Republican) 26.5%; ▌Henry W. Autsin (Socialist Workers) 0.1%
Michigan 16	John Dingell; Redistricted from 15th	Democratic	1955 (special)	Incumbent re-elected.	▌ ✓ John Dingell (Democratic) 73.4%; ▌Raymond B. Eonard (Republican) 26.5%; ▌Henry W. Autsin (Socialist Workers) 0.1%
Michigan 17	Martha Griffiths	Democratic	1954	Incumbent re-elected.	▌ ✓ Martha Griffiths (Democratic) 72.8%; ▌William P. Harrington (Republican) 27.0%; ▌Leo Bernard (Socialist Workers) 0.1%
Michigan 18	William Broomfield	Republican	1956	Incumbent re-elected.	▌ ✓ William Broomfield (Republican) 59.5%; ▌Frank J. Sierawski (Democratic) 40.4%; ▌Richard R. Kelly (Freedom Now) 0.08%
Michigan 19	Neil Staebler; Redistricted from at-large	Democratic	1962	Incumbent retired to run for governor. Democratic hold.	▌ ✓ Billie S. Farnum (Democratic) 53.4%; ▌Richard D. Kuhn (Republican) 46.6%

== Minnesota ==
District	Incumbent			This race	
District	Member	Party	First elected	Results	Candidates
Minnesota 1	Al Quie	Republican	1958	Incumbent re-elected.	▌ ✓ Al Quie (Republican) 55.3%; ▌George Daley (DFL) 44.7%
Minnesota 2	Ancher Nelsen	Republican	1958	Incumbent re-elected.	▌ ✓ Ancher Nelsen (Republican) 58.4%; ▌Charles V. Simpson (DFL) 41.6%
Minnesota 3	Clark MacGregor	Republican	1960	Incumbent re-elected.	▌ ✓ Clark MacGregor (Republican) 57.0%; ▌Richard J. Parish (DFL) 43.0%
Minnesota 4	Joseph Karth	DFL	1958	Incumbent re-elected.	▌ ✓ Joseph Karth (DFL) 72.3%; ▌John M. Drexler (Republican) 27.1%; ▌Other (write-in) 0.7%
Minnesota 5	Donald M. Fraser	DFL	1962	Incumbent re-elected.	▌ ✓ Donald M. Fraser (DFL) 61.9%; ▌John W. Johnson (Republican) 38.1%
Minnesota 6	Alec G. Olson	DFL	1962	Incumbent re-elected.	▌ ✓ Alec G. Olson (DFL) 51.8%; ▌Robert J. Odegard (Republican) 48.2%
Minnesota 7	Odin Langen	Republican	1958	Incumbent re-elected.	▌ ✓ Odin Langen (Republican) 50.8%; ▌Ben M. Wichterman (DFL) 49.2%
Minnesota 8	John Blatnik	DFL	1946	Incumbent re-elected.	▌ ✓ John Blatnik (DFL) 69.4%; ▌David W. Glossbrenner (Republican) 30.6%

== Mississippi ==
District	Incumbent			This race	
District	Member	Party	First elected	Results	Candidates
Mississippi 1	Thomas Abernethy	Democratic	1942	Incumbent re-elected.	▌ ✓ Thomas Abernethy (Democratic); Unopposed
Mississippi 2	Jamie Whitten	Democratic	1941 (special)	Incumbent re-elected.	▌ ✓ Jamie Whitten (Democratic); Unopposed
Mississippi 3	John Bell Williams	Democratic	1946	Incumbent re-elected.	▌ ✓ John Bell Williams (Democratic); Unopposed
Mississippi 4	W. Arthur Winstead	Democratic	1942	Incumbent lost re-election. Republican gain.	▌ ✓ Prentiss Walker (Republican) 55.7%; ▌W. Arthur Winstead (Democratic) 44.3%
Mississippi 5	William M. Colmer	Democratic	1932	Incumbent re-elected.	▌ ✓ William M. Colmer (Democratic); Unopposed

== Missouri ==
District	Incumbent			This race	
District	Member	Party	First elected	Results	Candidates
Missouri 1	Frank M. Karsten	Democratic	1946	Incumbent re-elected.	▌ ✓ Frank M. Karsten (Democratic) 76.9%; ▌Ted Fischer (Republican) 23.1%
Missouri 2	Thomas B. Curtis	Republican	1950	Incumbent re-elected.	▌ ✓ Thomas B. Curtis (Republican) 53.1%; ▌Sidney B. McClanahan (Democratic) 46.9%
Missouri 3	Leonor Sullivan	Democratic	1952	Incumbent re-elected.	▌ ✓ Leonor Sullivan (Democratic) 71.7%; ▌Howard C. Ohlendorf (Republican) 28.3%
Missouri 4	William J. Randall	Democratic	1959 (special)	Incumbent re-elected.	▌ ✓ William J. Randall (Democratic) 63.9%; ▌James M. Taylor (Republican) 36.1%
Missouri 5	Richard W. Bolling	Democratic	1948	Incumbent re-elected.	▌ ✓ Richard W. Bolling (Democratic) 69.3%; ▌Robert B. Langworthy (Republican) 30.7%
Missouri 6	William R. Hull Jr.	Democratic	1954	Incumbent re-elected.	▌ ✓ William R. Hull Jr. (Democratic) 64.7%; ▌Henry E. Wurst (Republican) 35.3%
Missouri 7	Durward G. Hall	Republican	1960	Incumbent re-elected.	▌ ✓ Durward G. Hall (Republican) 51.7%; ▌Jim Thomas (Democratic) 48.3%
Missouri 8	Richard H. Ichord Jr.	Democratic	1960	Incumbent re-elected.	▌ ✓ Richard H. Ichord Jr. (Democratic) 65.2%; ▌Ben A. Rogers (Republican) 34.8%
Missouri 9	Clarence Cannon	Democratic	1922	Incumbent died in office Democratic hold.	▌ ✓ William L. Hungate (Democratic) 62.3%; ▌Anthony C. Schroeder (Republican) 37.6%; ▌Hubert Willis (Independent) 0.1%
Missouri 10	Paul C. Jones	Democratic	1948	Incumbent re-elected.	▌ ✓ Paul C. Jones (Democratic) 67.4%; ▌Carl Franklin Painter (Republican) 32.6%

== Montana ==
District	Incumbent			This race	
District	Member	Party	First elected	Results	Candidates
Montana 1	Arnold Olsen	Democratic	1960	Incumbent re-elected.	▌ ✓ Arnold Olsen (Democratic) 53.6%; ▌Wayne Montgomery (Republican) 45.8%; ▌Wayne Montgomery (National States' Rights) 0.5%
Montana 2	James F. Battin	Republican	1960	Incumbent re-elected.	▌ ✓ James F. Battin (Republican) 54.1%; ▌Jack C. Toole (Democratic) 45.9%

== Nebraska ==
District	Incumbent			This race	
District	Member	Party	First elected	Results	Candidates
Nebraska 1	Ralph F. Beermann	Republican	1960	Incumbent lost re-election. Democratic gain.	▌ ✓ Clair A. Callan (Democratic) 51.3%; ▌Ralph F. Beermann (Republican) 48.7%
Nebraska 2	Glenn Cunningham	Republican	1956	Incumbent re-elected.	▌ ✓ Glenn Cunningham (Republican) 53.1%; ▌Richard Swenson (Democratic) 46.9%
Nebraska 3	David Martin	Republican	1960	Incumbent re-elected.	▌ ✓ David Martin (Republican) 52.8%; ▌William E. Colwell (Democratic) 47.2%

== Nevada ==
Nevada Results

District	Incumbent			This race	
District	Member	Party	First elected	Results	Candidates
Nevada at-large	Walter S. Baring Jr.	Democratic	1948; 1952 (lost); 1956	Incumbent re-elected.	▌ ✓ Walter S. Baring Jr. (Democratic) 63.3%; ▌George Von Tobel (Republican) 36.7%

== New Hampshire ==
District	Incumbent			This race	
District	Member	Party	First elected	Results	Candidates
New Hampshire 1	Louis C. Wyman	Republican	1962	Incumbent lost re-election. Democratic gain.	▌ ✓ J. Oliva Huot (Democratic) 51.3%; ▌Louis C. Wyman (Republican) 48.7%
New Hampshire 2	James Colgate Cleveland	Republican	1962	Incumbent re-elected.	▌ ✓ James Colgate Cleveland (Republican) 50.4%; ▌Charles B. Officer (Democratic) 49.6%

== New Jersey ==
District	Incumbent			This race	
District	Member	Party	First elected	Results	Candidates
New Jersey 1	William T. Cahill	Republican	1958	Incumbent re-elected.	▌ ✓ William T. Cahill (Republican) 56.2%; ▌William J. Procacci (Democratic) 43.7%; ▌Julius Levin (Socialist Labor) 0.1%
New Jersey 2	Milton W. Glenn	Republican	1957 (special)	Incumbent lost re-election. Democratic gain.	▌ ✓ Thomas C. McGrath Jr. (Democratic) 50.8%; ▌Milton W. Glenn (Republican) 49.2%
New Jersey 3	James C. Auchincloss	Republican	1942	Incumbent retired. Democratic gain.	▌ ✓ James J. Howard (Democratic) 50.4%; ▌Marcus Daly (Republican) 49.6%
New Jersey 4	Frank Thompson	Democratic	1954	Incumbent re-elected.	▌ ✓ Frank Thompson (Democratic) 67.5%; ▌Ephraim Tomlinson II (Republican) 32.3%; ▌Bernardo S. Doganiero (Socialist Labor) 0.2%
New Jersey 5	Peter Frelinghuysen Jr.	Republican	1952	Incumbent re-elected.	▌ ✓ Peter Frelinghuysen Jr. (Republican) 63.6%; ▌Eugene M. Friedman (Democratic) 36.4%
New Jersey 6	Florence P. Dwyer	Republican	1956	Incumbent re-elected.	▌ ✓ Florence P. Dwyer (Republican) 59.7%; ▌Richard J. Traynor (Democratic) 40.3%
New Jersey 7	William B. Widnall	Republican	1950	Incumbent re-elected.	▌ ✓ William B. Widnall (Republican) 56.5%; ▌Edward H. Ihnen (Democratic) 43.1%; ▌Robert A. Kretzer (Conservative) 0.4%
New Jersey 8	Charles S. Joelson	Democratic	1960	Incumbent re-elected.	▌ ✓ Charles S. Joelson (Democratic) 67.5%; ▌J. Palmer Murphy (Republican) 32.3%; ▌Harry Santhouse (Socialist Labor) 0.2%
New Jersey 9	Frank C. Osmers Jr.	Republican	1951 (special)	Incumbent lost re-election. Democratic gain.	▌ ✓ Henry Helstoski (Democratic) 50.1%; ▌Frank C. Osmers Jr. (Republican) 49.0%; ▌John J. Murray (Conservative) 0.7%; ▌Herman Rhael (Socialist Labor) 0.1%
New Jersey 10	Peter W. Rodino	Democratic	1948	Incumbent re-elected.	▌ ✓ Peter W. Rodino (Democratic) 74.0%; ▌Raymond W. Schroeder (Republican) 25.1%; ▌Frank J. DeGeorge (Conservative) 0.6%; ▌William Kirkland (Independent) 0.2%; ▌John V. Vespucci (Good Government) 0.2%
New Jersey 11	Joseph Minish	Democratic	1962	Incumbent re-elected.	▌ ✓ Joseph Minish (Democratic) 69.6%; ▌William L. Stubbs (Republican) 30.4%
New Jersey 12	George M. Wallhauser	Republican	1958	Incumbent retired. Democratic gain.	▌ ✓ Paul J. Krebs (Democratic) 52.4%; ▌David H. Wiener (Republican) 46.0%; ▌Robert L. Schlachter (Conservative) 1.4%; ▌Leo C. Fields Jr. (Independent) 0.3%
New Jersey 13	Neil Gallagher	Democratic	1958	Incumbent re-elected.	▌ ✓ Neil Gallagher (Democratic) 77.1%; ▌Cresenzi W. Castaldo (Republican) 21.5%; ▌Fred W. Romanowski (Independent) 1.4%
New Jersey 14	Dominick V. Daniels	Democratic	1958	Incumbent re-elected.	▌ ✓ Dominick V. Daniels (Democratic) 74.6%; ▌Cecil T. Woolsey (Republican) 25.4%
New Jersey 15	Edward J. Patten	Democratic	1962	Incumbent re-elected.	▌ ✓ Edward J. Patten (Democratic) 63.1%; ▌Bernard F. Rodgers (Republican) 36.9%

== New Mexico ==
District	Incumbent			This race	
District	Member	Party	First elected	Results	Candidates
New Mexico at-large	Thomas G. Morris	Democratic	1958	Incumbent re-elected.	▌ ✓ Thomas G. Morris (Democratic) 30.6%; ▌ ✓ E. S. Johnny Walker (Democratic) 26.0%; ▌Jack C. Redman (Republican) 24.4%; ▌Mike Sims (Republican) 19.0%
New Mexico at-large	Joseph Montoya	Democratic	1957 (special)	Incumbent retired to run for U.S. Senator. Democratic hold.	▌ ✓ Thomas G. Morris (Democratic) 30.6%; ▌ ✓ E. S. Johnny Walker (Democratic) 26.0%; ▌Jack C. Redman (Republican) 24.4%; ▌Mike Sims (Republican) 19.0%

== New York ==
District	Incumbent			This race	
District	Member	Party	First elected	Results	Candidates
New York 1	Otis G. Pike	Democratic	1960	Incumbent re-elected.	▌ ✓ Otis G. Pike (Democratic) 64.9%; ▌John J. Hart Jr. (Republican) 35.1%
New York 2	James R. Grover Jr.	Republican	1962	Incumbent re-elected.	▌ ✓ James R. Grover Jr. (Republican) 51.6%; ▌Edwyn Silberling (Democratic) 48.4%
New York 3	Steven Derounian	Republican	1952	Incumbent lost re-election. Democratic gain.	▌ ✓ Lester L. Wolff (Democratic) 50.7%; ▌Steven Derounian (Republican) 49.3%
New York 4	John W. Wydler	Republican	1962	Incumbent re-elected.	▌ ✓ John W. Wydler (Republican) 53.2%; ▌Joseph L. Marino (Democratic) 43.2%; ▌Stanley J. Levy (Independent) 3.6%
New York 5	Frank J. Becker	Republican	1952	Incumbent retired. Democratic gain.	▌ ✓ Herbert Tenzer (Democratic) 55.8%; ▌Ralph J. Edsell Jr. (Republican) 44.2%
New York 6	Seymour Halpern	Republican	1958	Incumbent re-elected.	▌ ✓ Seymour Halpern (Republican) 57.1%; ▌Emil Levin (Democratic) 42.9%
New York 7	Joseph P. Addabbo	Democratic	1960	Incumbent re-elected.	▌ ✓ Joseph P. Addabbo (Democratic) 69.8%; ▌Robert L. Nelson (Republican) 28.3%; ▌Erling Asheim (Conservative) 1.9%
New York 8	Benjamin Rosenthal	Democratic	1962	Incumbent re-elected.	▌ ✓ Benjamin Rosenthal (Democratic) 75.0%; ▌Vincent P. Brevetti (Republican) 22.4%; ▌Charles P. Hostek (Conservative) 2.6%
New York 9	James J. Delaney	Democratic	1944; 1946 (lost); 1948	Incumbent re-elected.	▌ ✓ James J. Delaney (Democratic) 65.9%; ▌Charles H. Cohen (Republican) 29.3%; ▌Howard Rudner (Liberal) 4.9%
New York 10	Emanuel Celler	Democratic	1922	Incumbent re-elected.	▌ ✓ Emanuel Celler (Democratic) 87.5%; ▌Samuel W. Held (Republican) 12.5%
New York 11	Eugene Keogh	Democratic	1936	Incumbent re-elected.	▌ ✓ Eugene Keogh (Democratic) 78.8%; ▌Herman Sanders (Republican) 18.6%; ▌Joseph R. Fontanetta (United Taxpayers) 2.6%
New York 12	Edna F. Kelly	Democratic	1949 (special)	Incumbent re-elected.	▌ ✓ Edna F. Kelly (Democratic) 81.7%; ▌Carlo G. Colavito (Republican) 18.3%
New York 13	Abraham J. Multer	Democratic	1947 (special)	Incumbent re-elected.	▌ ✓ Abraham J. Multer (Democratic) 69.1%; ▌Gerald S. Held (Republican) 18.6%; ▌Gerald M. Weisberg (Liberal) 12.4%
New York 14	John J. Rooney	Democratic	1944	Incumbent re-elected.	▌ ✓ John J. Rooney (Democratic) 77.4%; ▌Victor J. Tirabasso Jr. (Republican) 22.6%
New York 15	Hugh Carey	Democratic	1960	Incumbent re-elected.	▌ ✓ Hugh Carey (Democratic) 53.6%; ▌Luigi R. Marano (Republican) 46.4%
New York 16	John M. Murphy	Democratic	1962	Incumbent re-elected.	▌ ✓ John M. Murphy (Democratic) 61.4%; ▌David D. Smith (Republican) 38.6%
New York 17	John Lindsay	Republican	1958	Incumbent re-elected.	▌ ✓ John Lindsay (Republican) 71.5%; ▌Eleanor C. French (Democratic) 23.5%; ▌Kieran O'Doherty (Conservative) 5.0%
New York 18	Adam Clayton Powell Jr.	Democratic	1944	Incumbent re-elected.	▌ ✓ Adam Clayton Powell Jr. (Democratic) 84.6%; ▌Joseph A. Bailey (Republican) 10.4%; ▌Allan A. Lewis ([Liberal) 4.4%; ▌George Schuyler (Conservative) 0.6%
New York 19	Leonard Farbstein	Democratic	1956	Incumbent re-elected.	▌ ✓ Leonard Farbstein (Democratic) 68.9%; ▌Henry E. Del Rosso (Republican) 20.2%; ▌Edward A. Morrison (Liberal) 9.9%; ▌Suzanne La Follette (Conservative) 1.1%
New York 20	William Fitts Ryan	Democratic	1960	Incumbent re-elected.	▌ ✓ William Fitts Ryan (Democratic) 82.5%; ▌Ronald N. Gottlieb (Republican) 15.6%; ▌John Comninel (Conservative) 2.0%
New York 21	James C. Healey	Democratic	1956	Incumbent lost renomination. Democratic hold.	▌ ✓ James H. Scheuer (Democratic) 84.3%; ▌Henry Rose (Republican) 14.1%; ▌Thomas E. Rockwell (Conservative) 1.6%
New York 22	Jacob H. Gilbert	Democratic	1960	Incumbent re-elected.	▌ ✓ Jacob H. Gilbert (Democratic) 81.6%; ▌Manuel R. Roque (Republican) 11.8%; ▌Joseph A. Masur (Liberal) 5.8%; ▌Joseph F. Joyce (Conservative) 0.8%
New York 23	Charles A. Buckley	Democratic	1934	Incumbent lost renomination. Democratic hold.	▌ ✓ Jonathan B. Bingham (Democratic) 71.3%; ▌Patrick J. Foley (Republican) 20.1%; ▌John P. Hagan (Liberal) 7.0%; ▌William J. Lee Jr. (Conservative) 1.6%
New York 24	Paul A. Fino	Republican	1952	Incumbent re-elected.	▌ ✓ Paul A. Fino (Republican) 61.2%; ▌Robert J. Malang (Democratic) 35.3%; ▌Sylvia Bloom (Liberal) 3.6%
New York 25	Robert R. Barry	Republican	1958	Incumbent lost re-election. Democratic gain.	▌ ✓ Richard Ottinger (Democratic) 56.2%; ▌Robert R. Barry (Republican) 43.8%
New York 26	Ogden R. Reid	Republican	1962	Incumbent re-elected.	▌ ✓ Ogden R. Reid (Republican) 54.9%; ▌Frank Conniff (Democratic) 42.2%; ▌Robert F. Mitchell Jr. (Conservative) 2.9%
New York 27	Katharine St. George	Republican	1946	Incumbent lost re-election. Democratic gain.	▌ ✓ John G. Dow (Democratic) 51.6%; ▌Katharine St. George (Republican) 48.4%
New York 28	J. Ernest Wharton	Republican	1950	Incumbent lost re-election. Democratic gain.	▌ ✓ Joseph Y. Resnick (Democratic) 51.8%; ▌J. Ernest Wharton (Republican) 45.4%; ▌William G. Davis (Liberal) 2.7%
New York 29	Leo W. O'Brien	Democratic	1952	Incumbent re-elected.	▌ ✓ Leo W. O'Brien (Democratic) 69.2%; ▌John D. Meader (Republican) 30.8%
New York 30	Carleton J. King	Republican	1960	Incumbent re-elected.	▌ ✓ Carleton J. King (Republican) 50.3%; ▌Joseph J. Martin (Democratic) 49.7%
New York 31	Clarence E. Kilburn	Republican	1940	Incumbent retired. Republican hold.	▌ ✓ Robert C. McEwen (Republican) 54.8%; ▌Raymond E. Bishop (Democratic) 45.2%
New York 32	Alexander Pirnie	Republican	1958	Incumbent re-elected.	▌ ✓ Alexander Pirnie (Republican) 53.4%; ▌Robert Castle (Democratic) 46.6%
New York 33	Howard W. Robison	Republican	1958	Incumbent re-elected.	▌ ✓ Howard W. Robison (Republican) 58.4%; ▌John L. Joy (Democratic) 41.6%
New York 34	R. Walter Riehlman	Republican	1946	Incumbent lost re-election. Democratic gain.	▌ ✓ James M. Hanley (Democratic) 51.2%; ▌R. Walter Riehlman (Republican) 48.8%
New York 35	Samuel S. Stratton	Democratic	1958	Incumbent re-elected.	▌ ✓ Samuel S. Stratton (Democratic) 64.0%; ▌Robert M. Quigley (Republican) 36.0%
New York 36	Frank Horton	Republican	1962	Incumbent re-elected.	▌ ✓ Frank Horton (Republican) 56.0%; ▌John C. Williams (Democratic) 42.5%; ▌Helmut A. Zander (Liberal) 1.5%
New York 37	Harold C. Ostertag	Republican	1950	Incumbent retired. Republican hold.	▌ ✓ Barber Conable (Republican) 54.2%; ▌Neil F. Bubel (Democratic) 44.0%; ▌David L. MacAdam (Liberal) 1.8%
New York 38	Charles Goodell	Republican	1959 (special)	Incumbent re-elected.	▌ ✓ Charles Goodell (Republican) 59.6%; ▌Robert V. Kelley (Democratic) 40.4%
New York 39	John R. Pillion	Republican	1952	Incumbent lost re-election. Democratic gain.	▌ ✓ Richard D. McCarthy (Democratic) 52.8%; ▌John R. Pillion (Republican) 47.2%
New York 40	William E. Miller	Republican	1950	Incumbent retired to run for Vice President. Republican hold.	▌ ✓ Henry P. Smith III (Republican) 51.5%; ▌Wesley J. Hilts (Democratic) 46.3%; ▌James A. Peck (Liberal) 2.2%
New York 41	Thaddeus J. Dulski	Democratic	1958	Incumbent re-elected.	▌ ✓ Thaddeus J. Dulski (Democratic) 82.1%; ▌Joseph A. Klawon (Republican) 17.9%

== North Carolina ==
District	Incumbent			This race	
District	Member	Party	First elected	Results	Candidates
North Carolina 1	Herbert Covington Bonner	Democratic	1940	Incumbent re-elected.	▌ ✓ Herbert Covington Bonner (Democratic) 82.6%; ▌Zeno O. Ratcliff (Republican) 17.4%
North Carolina 2	Lawrence H. Fountain	Democratic	1952	Incumbent re-elected.	▌ ✓ Lawrence H. Fountain (Democratic); Unopposed
North Carolina 3	David N. Henderson	Democratic	1960	Incumbent re-elected.	▌ ✓ David N. Henderson (Democratic) 67.4%; ▌Sherman T. Rock (Republican) 32.6%
North Carolina 4	Harold D. Cooley	Democratic	1934	Incumbent re-elected.	▌ ✓ Harold D. Cooley (Democratic) 51.8%; ▌Jim Gardner (Republican) 48.2%
North Carolina 5	Ralph James Scott	Democratic	1956	Incumbent re-elected.	▌ ✓ Ralph James Scott (Democratic) 51.6%; ▌W. A. Armfield (Republican) 48.4%
North Carolina 6	Horace R. Kornegay	Democratic	1960	Incumbent re-elected.	▌ ✓ Horace R. Kornegay (Democratic) 61.4%; ▌Walter G. Green (Republican) 38.6%
North Carolina 7	Alton Lennon	Democratic	1956	Incumbent re-elected.	▌ ✓ Alton Lennon (Democratic); Unopposed
North Carolina 8	Charles R. Jonas	Republican	1952	Incumbent re-elected.	▌ ✓ Charles R. Jonas (Republican) 54.3%; ▌W. D. James (Democratic) 45.7%
North Carolina 9	Jim Broyhill	Republican	1962	Incumbent re-elected.	▌ ✓ Jim Broyhill (Republican) 55.2%; ▌Robert M. Davis (Democratic) 44.8%
North Carolina 10	Basil Whitener	Democratic	1956	Incumbent re-elected.	▌ ✓ Basil Whitener (Democratic) 58.6%; ▌W. Hall Young (Republican) 41.4%
North Carolina 11	Roy A. Taylor	Democratic	1960	Incumbent re-elected.	▌ ✓ Roy A. Taylor (Democratic) 60.5%; ▌Clyde M. Roberts (Republican) 39.5%

== North Dakota ==
District	Incumbent			This race	
District	Member	Party	First elected	Results	Candidates
North Dakota 1	Mark Andrews	Republican	1963 (special)	Incumbent re-elected.	▌ ✓ Mark Andrews (Republican) 52.1%; ▌George A. Sinner (Democratic-NPL) 47.4%; ▌Eugene Van Der Hoeven (Independent) 0.3%; ▌Roger Vorachek (Independent) 0.2%
North Dakota 2	Don L. Short	Republican	1958	Incumbent lost re-election. Democratic-NPL gain.	▌ ✓ Rolland W. Redlin (Democratic-NPL) 52.5%; ▌Don L. Short (Republican) 47.5%

== Ohio ==
District	Incumbent			This race	
District	Member	Party	First elected	Results	Candidates
Ohio 1	Carl West Rich	Republican	1962	Incumbent lost re-election. Democratic gain.	▌ ✓ John J. Gilligan (Democratic) 51.9%; ▌Carl West Rich (Republican) 48.1%
Ohio 2	Donald D. Clancy	Republican	1960	Incumbent re-elected.	▌ ✓ Donald D. Clancy (Republican) 60.5%; ▌H. A. Sand (Democratic) 39.5%
Ohio 3	Paul F. Schenck	Republican	1951 (special)	Incumbent lost re-election. Democratic gain.	▌ ✓ Rodney M. Love (Democratic) 52.0%; ▌Paul F. Schenck (Republican) 48.0%
Ohio 4	William M. McCulloch	Republican	1947 (special)	Incumbent re-elected.	▌ ✓ William M. McCulloch (Republican) 55.7%; ▌Robert H. Mihlbaugh (Democratic) 44.3%
Ohio 5	Del Latta	Republican	1958	Incumbent re-elected.	▌ ✓ Del Latta (Republican) 65.9%; ▌Milford Landis (Democratic) 34.1%
Ohio 6	Bill Harsha	Republican	1960	Incumbent re-elected.	▌ ✓ Bill Harsha (Republican) 60.1%; ▌Frank E. Smith (Democratic) 39.9%
Ohio 7	Clarence J. Brown	Republican	1938	Incumbent re-elected.	▌ ✓ Clarence J. Brown (Republican) 56.8%; ▌Jerry R. Graham (Democratic) 43.2%
Ohio 8	Jackson Edward Betts	Republican	1950	Incumbent re-elected.	▌ ✓ Jackson Edward Betts (Republican) 61.8%; ▌Frank Bennett (Democratic) 38.2%
Ohio 9	Thomas L. Ashley	Democratic	1954	Incumbent re-elected.	▌ ✓ Thomas L. Ashley (Democratic) 62.9%; ▌John O. Celusta (Republican) 37.1%
Ohio 10	Pete Abele	Republican	1962	Incumbent lost re-election. Democratic gain.	▌ ✓ Walter H. Moeller (Democratic) 52.4%; ▌Pete Abele (Republican) 47.6%
Ohio 11	Oliver P. Bolton	Republican	1962	Ran for at-large seat Republican hold.	▌ ✓ J. William Stanton (Republican) 55.4%; ▌C. D. Lambros (Democratic) 44.6%
Ohio 12	Samuel L. Devine	Republican	1958	Incumbent re-elected.	▌ ✓ Samuel L. Devine (Republican) 55.4%; ▌Robert L. Van Heyde (Democratic) 44.6%
Ohio 13	Charles Adams Mosher	Republican	1960	Incumbent re-elected.	▌ ✓ Charles Adams Mosher (Republican) 54.7%; ▌Louis Frey (Democratic) 45.3%
Ohio 14	William Hanes Ayres	Republican	1950	Incumbent re-elected.	▌ ✓ William Hanes Ayres (Republican) 54.7%; ▌Frances McGovern (Democratic) 45.3%
Ohio 15	Robert T. Secrest	Democratic	1962	Incumbent re-elected.	▌ ✓ Robert T. Secrest (Democratic) 66.3%; ▌Randall Metcalf (Republican) 33.7%
Ohio 16	Frank T. Bow	Republican	1950	Incumbent re-elected.	▌ ✓ Frank T. Bow (Republican) 52.2%; ▌Robert D. Freeman (Democratic) 47.8%
Ohio 17	John M. Ashbrook	Republican	1960	Incumbent re-elected.	▌ ✓ John M. Ashbrook (Republican) 51.5%; ▌Robert W. Levering (Democratic) 48.5%
Ohio 18	Wayne Hays	Democratic	1948	Incumbent re-elected.	▌ ✓ Wayne Hays (Democratic) 68.8%; ▌Allen J. Dalrymple (Republican) 31.2%
Ohio 19	Michael J. Kirwan	Democratic	1936	Incumbent re-elected.	▌ ✓ Michael J. Kirwan (Democratic) 76.3%; ▌Albert James (Republican) 23.7%
Ohio 20	Michael A. Feighan	Democratic	1942	Incumbent re-elected.	▌ ✓ Michael A. Feighan (Democratic) 74.4%; ▌Joseph A. Cipollone (Republican) 25.6%
Ohio 21	Charles Vanik	Democratic	1954	Incumbent re-elected.	▌ ✓ Charles Vanik (Democratic) 90.1%; ▌Eugene A. Smith (Republican) 9.9%
Ohio 22	Frances P. Bolton	Republican	1940	Incumbent re-elected.	▌ ✓ Frances P. Bolton (Republican) 56.6%; ▌Chat Paterson (Democratic) 43.4%
Ohio 23	William Edwin Minshall Jr.	Republican	1954	Incumbent re-elected.	▌ ✓ William Edwin Minshall Jr. (Republican) 67.2%; ▌Norbert G. Dennerll Jr. (Democratic) 32.8%
Ohio at-large	Robert Taft Jr.	Republican	1962	Incumbent retired to run for U.S. Senator. Democratic gain.	▌ ✓ Robert E. Sweeney (Democratic) 52.2%; ▌Oliver P. Bolton (Republican) 47.8%

== Oklahoma ==
District	Incumbent			This race	
District	Member	Party	First elected	Results	Candidates
Oklahoma 1	Page Belcher	Republican	1950	Incumbent re-elected.	▌ ✓ Page Belcher (Republican) 63.5%; ▌Doug Martin (Democratic) 36.5%
Oklahoma 2	Ed Edmondson	Democratic	1952	Incumbent re-elected.	▌ ✓ Ed Edmondson (Democratic) 61.4%; ▌George L. Lange (Republican) 38.6%
Oklahoma 3	Carl Albert	Democratic	1946	Incumbent re-elected.	▌ ✓ Carl Albert (Democratic) 79.0%; ▌Frank D. McSherry (Republican) 21.0%
Oklahoma 4	Tom Steed	Democratic	1948	Incumbent re-elected.	▌ ✓ Tom Steed (Democratic); Unopposed
Oklahoma 5	John Jarman	Democratic	1950	Incumbent re-elected.	▌ ✓ John Jarman (Democratic) 70.8%; ▌Homer Cowan (Republican) 29.2%
Oklahoma 6	Victor Wickersham	Democratic	1960	Incumbent lost renomination. Democratic hold.	▌ ✓ Jed Johnson Jr. (Democratic) 56.7%; ▌Bayard C. Auchincloss (Republican) 43.3%

== Oregon ==
District	Incumbent			This race	
District	Member	Party	First elected	Results	Candidates
Oregon 1	A. Walter Norblad	Republican	1946	Incumbent died in office. Republican hold.	▌ ✓ Wendell Wyatt (Republican) 53.1%; ▌R. Blaine Whipple (Democratic) 46.9%
Oregon 2	Al Ullman	Democratic	1956	Incumbent re-elected.	▌ ✓ Al Ullman (Democratic) 68.1%; ▌Everett J. Thoren (Republican) 31.9%
Oregon 3	Edith Green	Democratic	1954	Incumbent re-elected.	▌ ✓ Edith Green (Democratic) 65.7%; ▌Lyle Dean (Republican) 34.3%
Oregon 4	Robert B. Duncan	Democratic	1962	Incumbent re-elected.	▌ ✓ Robert B. Duncan (Democratic) 64.8%; ▌Paul Jaffarian (Republican) 35.2%

== Pennsylvania ==
District	Incumbent			This race	
District	Member	Party	First elected	Results	Candidates
Pennsylvania 1	William A. Barrett	Democratic	1944; 1946 (lost); 1948	Incumbent re-elected.	▌ ✓ William A. Barrett (Democratic) 71.8%; ▌Alvin J. Bello (Republican) 28.2%
Pennsylvania 2	Robert N. C. Nix Sr.	Democratic	1958	Incumbent re-elected.	▌ ✓ Robert N. C. Nix Sr. (Democratic) 80.2%; ▌Melvin C. Howell (Republican) 19.8%
Pennsylvania 3	James A. Byrne	Democratic	1952	Incumbent re-elected.	▌ ✓ James A. Byrne (Democratic) 72.0%; ▌John J. Poserina Jr. (Republican) 28.0%
Pennsylvania 4	Herman Toll	Democratic	1958	Incumbent re-elected.	▌ ✓ Herman Toll (Democratic) 64.1%; ▌James R. Cavanaugh (Republican) 35.9%
Pennsylvania 5	William J. Green III	Democratic	1964 (special)	Incumbent re-elected.	▌ ✓ William J. Green III (Democratic) 65.2%; ▌Edward H. Rovner (Republican) 34.8%
Pennsylvania 6	George M. Rhodes	Democratic	1948	Incumbent re-elected.	▌ ✓ George M. Rhodes (Democratic) 62.1%; ▌James B. Bamford (Republican) 37.9%
Pennsylvania 7	William H. Milliken Jr.	Republican	1958	Incumbent retired. Republican hold.	▌ ✓ George Watkins (Republican) 51.1%; ▌Leonard Bachman (Democratic) 48.9%
Pennsylvania 8	Willard S. Curtin	Republican	1956	Incumbent re-elected.	▌ ✓ Willard S. Curtin (Republican) 51.1%; ▌Ralph O. Samuel (Democratic) 48.9%
Pennsylvania 9	Paul B. Dague	Republican	1946	Incumbent re-elected.	▌ ✓ Paul B. Dague (Republican) 57.7%; ▌John A. O'Brien (Democratic) 42.3%
Pennsylvania 10	Joseph M. McDade	Republican	1962	Incumbent re-elected.	▌ ✓ Joseph M. McDade (Republican) 50.8%; ▌James J. Haggerty (Democratic) 49.2%
Pennsylvania 11	Dan Flood	Democratic	1944; 1946 (lost); 1948; 1952 (lost); 1954	Incumbent re-elected.	▌ ✓ Dan Flood (Democratic) 77.4%; ▌Charles R. Thomas (Republican) 22.6%
Pennsylvania 12	J. Irving Whalley	Republican	1960	Incumbent re-elected.	▌ ✓ J. Irving Whalley (Republican) 58.6%; ▌Paul A. Stephens (Democratic) 41.4%
Pennsylvania 13	Richard Schweiker	Republican	1960	Incumbent re-elected.	▌ ✓ Richard Schweiker (Republican) 59.1%; ▌William D. Searle (Democratic) 40.9%
Pennsylvania 14	William S. Moorhead	Democratic	1958	Incumbent re-elected.	▌ ✓ William S. Moorhead (Democratic) 74.8%; ▌Alvin D. Capozzi (Republican) 25.2%
Pennsylvania 15	Fred B. Rooney	Democratic	1963	Incumbent re-elected.	▌ ✓ Fred B. Rooney (Democratic) 66.1%; ▌Leo W. McCormick (Republican) 33.9%
Pennsylvania 16	John C. Kunkel	Republican	1961	Incumbent re-elected.	▌ ✓ John C. Kunkel (Republican) 64.1%; ▌William M. Stefanic (Democratic) 35.9%
Pennsylvania 17	Herman T. Schneebeli	Republican	1960	Incumbent re-elected.	▌ ✓ Herman T. Schneebeli (Republican) 58.0%; ▌William F. Plankenhorn (Democratic) 42.0%
Pennsylvania 18	Robert J. Corbett	Republican	1938; 1940 (lost); 1944	Incumbent re-elected.	▌ ✓ Robert J. Corbett (Republican) 62.6%; ▌Frank J. Reed (Democratic) 37.4%
Pennsylvania 19	George A. Goodling	Republican	1960	Incumbent lost re-election. Democratic gain.	▌ ✓ Nathaniel N. Craley Jr. (Democratic) 50.8%; ▌George A. Goodling (Republican) 49.2%
Pennsylvania 20	Elmer J. Holland	Democratic	1942 (special); 1942 (retired); 1956 (special)	Incumbent re-elected.	▌ ✓ Elmer J. Holland (Democratic) 74.4%; ▌Ronald Bryan (Republican) 25.6%
Pennsylvania 21	John Herman Dent	Democratic	1958	Incumbent re-elected.	▌ ✓ John Herman Dent (Democratic) 65.8%; ▌Thomas M. Schooley Jr. (Republican) 34.2%
Pennsylvania 22	John P. Saylor	Republican	1949 (special)	Incumbent re-elected.	▌ ✓ John P. Saylor (Republican) 57.0%; ▌James E. McCaffrey (Democratic) 43.0%
Pennsylvania 23	Albert W. Johnson	Republican	1963 (special)	Incumbent re-elected.	▌ ✓ Albert W. Johnson (Republican) 54.9%; ▌John Still (Democratic) 45.1%
Pennsylvania 24	James D. Weaver	Republican	1962	Incumbent lost re-election. Democratic gain.	▌ ✓ Joseph P. Vigorito (Democratic) 50.8%; ▌James D. Weaver (Republican) 49.2%
Pennsylvania 25	Frank M. Clark	Democratic	1954	Incumbent re-elected.	▌ ✓ Frank M. Clark (Democratic) 70.3%; ▌John Loth (Republican) 29.7%
Pennsylvania 26	Thomas E. Morgan	Democratic	1944	Incumbent re-elected.	▌ ✓ Thomas E. Morgan (Democratic) 68.1%; ▌Paul P. Riggle (Republican) 31.9%
Pennsylvania 27	James G. Fulton	Republican	1944	Incumbent re-elected.	▌ ✓ James G. Fulton (Republican) 62.7%; ▌John A. Young (Democratic) 37.3%

== Rhode Island ==
District	Incumbent			This race	
District	Member	Party	First elected	Results	Candidates
Rhode Island 1	Fernand St Germain	Democratic	1960	Incumbent re-elected.	▌ ✓ Fernand St Germain (Democratic) 66.3%; ▌Rolland H. Blanchette (Republican) 33.7%
Rhode Island 2	John E. Fogarty	Democratic	1940	Incumbent re-elected.	▌ ✓ John E. Fogarty (Democratic) 81.3%; ▌Guy J. Wells (Republican) 18.7%

== South Carolina ==
District	Incumbent			This race	
District	Member	Party	First elected	Results	Candidates
South Carolina 1	L. Mendel Rivers	Democratic	1940	Incumbent re-elected.	▌ ✓ L. Mendel Rivers (Democratic); Unopposed
South Carolina 2	Albert Watson	Democratic	1962	Incumbent re-elected.	▌ ✓ Albert Watson (Democratic); Unopposed
South Carolina 3	William J. B. Dorn	Democratic	1946; 1948 (retired); 1950	Incumbent re-elected.	▌ ✓ William J. B. Dorn (Democratic); Unopposed
South Carolina 4	Robert T. Ashmore	Democratic	1953 (special)	Incumbent re-elected.	▌ ✓ Robert T. Ashmore (Democratic); Unopposed
South Carolina 5	Robert W. Hemphill	Democratic	1956	Resigned when appointed to US District Court. Democratic hold.	▌ ✓ Thomas S. Gettys (Democratic) 66.7%; ▌Robert M. Doster (Republican) 33.3%
South Carolina 6	John L. McMillan	Democratic	1938	Incumbent re-elected.	▌ ✓ John L. McMillan (Democratic) 65.0%; ▌E. R. Kirkland (Republican) 35.0%

== South Dakota ==
District	Incumbent			This race	
District	Member	Party	First elected	Results	Candidates
South Dakota 1	Ben Reifel	Republican	1960	Incumbent re-elected.	▌ ✓ Ben Reifel (Republican) 57.5%; ▌George May (Democratic) 42.5%
South Dakota 2	E. Y. Berry	Republican	1950	Incumbent re-elected.	▌ ✓ E. Y. Berry (Republican) 56.0%; ▌Byron T. Brown (Democratic) 44.0%

== Tennessee ==
District	Incumbent			This race	
District	Member	Party	First elected	Results	Candidates
Tennessee 1	Jimmy Quillen	Republican	1962	Incumbent re-elected.	▌ ✓ Jimmy Quillen (Republican) 71.7%; ▌Arthur Bright (Democratic) 28.3%
Tennessee 2	Irene Baker	Republican	1964 (special)	Incumbent retired. Republican hold.	▌ ✓ John Duncan Sr. (Republican) 53.8%; ▌Willard V. Yarbrough (Democratic) 44.5%; ▌J. D. Boles (Independent) 1.0%; ▌Frank Haile (Independent) 0.7%
Tennessee 3	Bill Brock	Republican	1962	Incumbent re-elected.	▌ ✓ Bill Brock (Republican) 54.6%; ▌Robert M. Summitt (Democratic) 45.4%
Tennessee 4	Joe L. Evins	Democratic	1946	Incumbent re-elected.	▌ ✓ Joe L. Evins (Democratic); Unopposed
Tennessee 5	Richard Fulton	Democratic	1946	Incumbent re-elected.	▌ ✓ Richard Fulton (Democratic) 59.8%; ▌Bill R. Wills (Republican) 40.2%
Tennessee 6	Ross Bass	Democratic	1954	Incumbent retired to run for U.S. Senator. Democratic hold.	▌ ✓ William Anderson (Democratic) 78.2%; ▌Cecil R. Hill (Republican) 21.8%
Tennessee 7	Tom J. Murray	Democratic	1942	Incumbent re-elected.	▌ ✓ Tom J. Murray (Democratic) 53.5%; ▌Julius Hurst (Republican) 36.9%; ▌Earl MacLin (Independent) 9.6%
Tennessee 8	Fats Everett	Democratic	1958	Incumbent re-elected.	▌ ✓ Fats Everett (Democratic) 93.9%; ▌Sara Flannary (Independent) 6.1%
Tennessee 9	Clifford Davis	Democratic	1940	Incumbent lost renomination. Democratic hold.	▌ ✓ George W. Grider (Democratic) 52.5%; ▌Robert B. James (Republican) 47.2%; ▌L. B. Winfield (Independent) 0.3%

== Texas ==
District	Incumbent			This race	
District	Member	Party	First elected	Results	Candidates
Texas 1	Wright Patman	Democratic	1928	Incumbent re-elected.	▌ ✓ Wright Patman (Democratic) 74.6%; ▌Mrs. William E. Jones (Republican) 25.4%
Texas 2	Jack Brooks	Democratic	1952	Incumbent re-elected.	▌ ✓ Jack Brooks (Democratic) 62.7%; ▌John Greco (Republican) 37.3%
Texas 3	Lindley Beckworth	Democratic	1956	Incumbent re-elected.	▌ ✓ Lindley Beckworth (Democratic) 59.3%; ▌James Warren (Republican) 40.7%
Texas 4	Ray Roberts	Democratic	1962	Incumbent re-elected.	▌ ✓ Ray Roberts (Democratic) 81.4%; ▌Fred Banfield (Republican) 18.6%
Texas 5	Bruce R. Alger	Republican	1954	Incumbent lost re-election. Democratic gain.	▌ ✓ Earle Cabell (Democratic) 57.5%; ▌Bruce R. Alger (Republican) 42.5%
Texas 6	Olin E. Teague	Democratic	1946	Incumbent re-elected.	▌ ✓ Olin E. Teague (Democratic) 82.2%; ▌William Van Winkle (Republican) 17.8%
Texas 7	John Dowdy	Democratic	1952	Incumbent re-elected.	▌ ✓ John Dowdy (Democratic) 83.6%; ▌James W. Orr (Republican) 16.4%
Texas 8	Albert Thomas	Democratic	1936	Incumbent re-elected.	▌ ✓ Albert Thomas (Democratic) 76.8%; ▌Bob Gilbert (Republican) 23.2%
Texas 9	Clark W. Thompson	Democratic	1947 (special)	Incumbent re-elected.	▌ ✓ Clark W. Thompson (Democratic) 75.3%; ▌Dave Oakes (Republican) 24.7%
Texas 10	J. J. Pickle	Democratic	1963 (special)	Incumbent re-elected.	▌ ✓ J. J. Pickle (Democratic) 75.8%; ▌Billie Pratt (Republican) 24.2%
Texas 11	William R. Poage	Democratic	1936	Incumbent re-elected.	▌ ✓ William R. Poage (Democratic) 81.5%; ▌Charles M. Isenhower (Republican) 18.5%
Texas 12	Jim Wright	Democratic	1954	Incumbent re-elected.	▌ ✓ Jim Wright (Democratic) 68.5%; ▌Fred Dielman (Republican) 31.5%
Texas 13	Graham B. Purcell Jr.	Democratic	1962	Incumbent re-elected.	▌ ✓ Graham B. Purcell Jr. (Democratic) 75.2%; ▌George Corse (Republican) 24.8%
Texas 14	John Andrew Young	Democratic	1956	Incumbent re-elected.	▌ ✓ John Andrew Young (Democratic) 77.5%; ▌W. F. Patton (Republican) 22.5%
Texas 15	Joe M. Kilgore	Democratic	1954	Incumbent retired. Democratic hold.	▌ ✓ Kika de la Garza (Democratic) 69.4%; ▌Joe B. Coulter (Republican) 30.6%
Texas 16	Ed Foreman	Republican	1962	Incumbent lost re-election. Democratic gain.	▌ ✓ Richard Crawford White (Democratic) 55.7%; ▌Ed Foreman (Republican) 44.3%
Texas 17	Omar Burleson	Democratic	1946	Incumbent re-elected.	▌ ✓ Omar Burleson (Democratic) 76.4%; ▌Phil Bridges (Republican) 23.6%
Texas 18	Walter E. Rogers	Democratic	1950	Incumbent re-elected.	▌ ✓ Walter E. Rogers (Democratic) 55.0%; ▌Robert Price (Republican) 45.0%
Texas 19	George H. Mahon	Democratic	1934	Incumbent re-elected.	▌ ✓ George H. Mahon (Democratic) 77.6%; ▌Joe B. Philips (Republican) 22.4%
Texas 20	Henry B. González	Democratic	1961 (special)	Incumbent re-elected.	▌ ✓ Henry B. González (Democratic) 64.6%; ▌John O'Connell (Republican) 35.4%
Texas 21	O. C. Fisher	Democratic	1942	Incumbent re-elected.	▌ ✓ O. C. Fisher (Democratic) 78.1%; ▌Harry Claypool (Republican) 21.9%
Texas 22	Robert R. Casey	Democratic	1958	Incumbent re-elected.	▌ ✓ Robert R. Casey (Democratic) 58.1%; ▌Desmond Barry (Republican) 41.9%
Texas at-large	Joe R. Pool	Democratic	1962	Incumbent re-elected.	▌ ✓ Joe R. Pool (Democratic) 66.9%; ▌Bill Hayes (Republican) 32.7%; ▌Bill Johnson (Constitution) 0.4%

== Utah ==
District	Incumbent			This race	
District	Member	Party	First elected	Results	Candidates
Utah 1	Laurence J. Burton	Republican	1962	Incumbent re-elected.	▌ ✓ Laurence J. Burton (Republican) 56.0%; ▌William G. Bruhn (Democratic) 44.0%
Utah 2	Sherman P. Lloyd	Republican	1962	Incumbent retired to run for U.S. Senator. Democratic gain.	▌ ✓ David S. King (Democratic) 57.5%; ▌Thomas G. Judd (Republican) 42.5%

== Vermont ==
District	Incumbent			This race	
District	Member	Party	First elected	Results	Candidates
Vermont at-large	Robert Stafford	Republican	1960	Incumbent re-elected.	▌ ✓ Robert Stafford (Republican) 57.8%; ▌Bernard G. O'Shea (Democratic) 42.2%

== Virginia ==
District	Incumbent			This race	
District	Member	Party	First elected	Results	Candidates
Virginia 1	Thomas N. Downing	Democratic	1958	Incumbent re-elected.	▌ ✓ Thomas N. Downing (Democratic) 78.7%; ▌Wayne C. Thiessen (Republican) 21.3%
Virginia 2	Porter Hardy Jr.	Democratic	1946	Incumbent re-elected.	▌ ✓ Porter Hardy Jr. (Democratic) 68.7%; ▌Wayne Lustig (Republican) 21.6%; ▌H. W. Grady Speers Jr. (Independent) 9.7%
Virginia 3	J. Vaughan Gary	Democratic	1945 (special)	Incumbent retired. Democratic hold.	▌ ✓ David E. Satterfield III (Democratic) 34.5%; ▌Richard D. Obenshain (Republican) 34.0%; ▌Edward E. Haddock (Independent) 30.8%; ▌Stanley Smith Jr. (Independent) 0.7%
Virginia 4	Watkins Abbitt	Democratic	1948	Incumbent re-elected.	▌ ✓ Watkins Abbitt (Democratic) 69.5%; ▌S. W. Tucker (Independent) 30.5%
Virginia 5	William M. Tuck	Democratic	1953 (special)	Incumbent re-elected.	▌ ✓ William M. Tuck (Democratic) 63.5%; ▌Robert L. Gilliam (Independent) 36.5%
Virginia 6	Richard H. Poff	Republican	1952	Incumbent re-elected.	▌ ✓ Richard H. Poff (Republican) 56.2%; ▌William B. Hopkins (Democratic) 43.8%
Virginia 7	John O. Marsh Jr.	Democratic	1962	Incumbent re-elected.	▌ ✓ John O. Marsh Jr. (Democratic) 69.6%; ▌Roy Erickson (Republican) 30.4%
Virginia 8	Howard W. Smith	Democratic	1930	Incumbent re-elected.	▌ ✓ Howard W. Smith (Democratic) 70.3%; ▌Floyd Caldwell Bagley (Independent) 29.7%
Virginia 9	W. Pat Jennings	Democratic	1954	Incumbent re-elected.	▌ ✓ W. Pat Jennings (Democratic) 58.2%; ▌Glen M. Williams (Republican) 41.8%
Virginia 10	Joel Broyhill	Republican	1952	Incumbent re-elected.	▌ ✓ Joel Broyhill (Republican) 50.7%; ▌Augustus C. Johnson (Democratic) 49.3%

== Washington ==
District	Incumbent			This race	
District	Member	Party	First elected	Results	Candidates
Washington 1	Thomas Pelly	Republican	1952	Incumbent re-elected.	▌ ✓ Thomas Pelly (Republican) 59.9%; ▌Edward Palmason (Democratic) 40.1%
Washington 2	Jack Westland	Republican	1952	Incumbent lost re-election. Democratic gain.	▌ ✓ Lloyd Meeds (Democratic) 54.9%; ▌Jack Westland (Republican) 45.1%
Washington 3	Julia Butler Hansen	Democratic	1960	Incumbent re-elected.	▌ ✓ Julia Butler Hansen (Democratic) 70.2%; ▌Harold L. Anderson (Republican) 29.8%
Washington 4	Catherine Dean May	Republican	1958	Incumbent re-elected.	▌ ✓ Catherine Dean May (Republican) 65.3%; ▌Stephen H. Huza (Democratic) 34.7%
Washington 5	Walt Horan	Republican	1942	Incumbent lost re-election. Democratic gain.	▌ ✓ Tom Foley (Democratic) 53.4%; ▌Walt Horan (Republican) 46.6%
Washington 6	Thor C. Tollefson	Republican	1946	Incumbent lost re-election. Democratic gain.	▌ ✓ Floyd Hicks (Democratic) 52.1%; ▌Thor C. Tollefson (Republican) 47.9%
Washington 7	K. William Stinson	Republican	1962	Incumbent lost re-election. Democratic gain.	▌ ✓ Brock Adams (Democratic) 55.6%; ▌K. William Stinson (Republican) 44.4%

== West Virginia ==
District	Incumbent			This race	
District	Member	Party	First elected	Results	Candidates
West Virginia 1	Arch A. Moore Jr.	Republican	1956	Incumbent re-elected.	▌ ✓ Arch A. Moore Jr. (Republican) 61.4%; ▌John L. Bailey (Democratic) 38.6%
West Virginia 2	Harley Orrin Staggers	Democratic	1948	Incumbent re-elected.	▌ ✓ Harley Orrin Staggers (Democratic) 64.9%; ▌Stanley R. Cox Jr. (Republican) 35.1%
West Virginia 3	John M. Slack Jr.	Democratic	1958	Incumbent re-elected.	▌ ✓ John M. Slack Jr. (Democratic) 65.4%; ▌Jim Comstock (Republican) 34.6%
West Virginia 4	Ken Hechler	Democratic	1958	Incumbent re-elected.	▌ ✓ Ken Hechler (Democratic) 61.2%; ▌Jack L. Miller (Republican) 38.8%
West Virginia 5	Elizabeth Kee	Democratic	1951 (special)	Incumbent retired. Democratic hold.	▌ ✓ James Kee (Democratic) 70.0%; ▌Wade H. Ballard III (Republican) 30.0%

== Wisconsin ==
Wisconsin redistricted to adjust for demographic changes, merging the existing 9th district into the neighboring 3rd district in the west and forming a new 9th district in the Milwaukee suburbs with compensating boundary changes elsewhere.

District	Incumbent			This race	
District	Member	Party	First elected	Results	Candidates
Wisconsin 1	Henry C. Schadeberg	Republican	1960	Incumbent lost re-election. Democratic gain.	▌ ✓ Lynn E. Stalbaum (Democratic) 51.5%; ▌Henry C. Schadeberg (Republican) 48.5%
Wisconsin 2	Robert Kastenmeier	Democratic	1958	Incumbent re-elected.	▌ ✓ Robert Kastenmeier (Democratic) 63.6%; ▌Carl V. Kolata (Republican) 36.4%
Wisconsin 3	Vernon W. Thomson	Republican	1960	Incumbent re-elected.	▌ ✓ Vernon W. Thomson (Republican) 60.6%; ▌Harold C. Ristow (Democratic) 39.4%
Wisconsin 3	Lester Johnson; Redistricted from 9th	Democratic	1953	Incumbent retired. Democratic loss.	▌ ✓ Vernon W. Thomson (Republican) 60.6%; ▌Harold C. Ristow (Democratic) 39.4%
Wisconsin 4	Clement Zablocki	Democratic	1948	Incumbent re-elected.	▌ ✓ Clement Zablocki (Democratic) 74.2%; ▌Edward E. Estkowski (Republican) 25.8%
Wisconsin 5	Henry S. Reuss	Democratic	1954	Incumbent re-elected.	▌ ✓ Henry S. Reuss (Democratic) 76.0%; ▌Robert Taylor (Republican) 24.0%
Wisconsin 6	William Van Pelt	Republican	1950	Incumbent lost re-election. Democratic gain.	▌ ✓ John Abner Race (Democratic) 50.8%; ▌William Van Pelt (Republican) 49.2%
Wisconsin 7	Melvin Laird	Republican	1952	Incumbent re-elected.	▌ ✓ Melvin Laird (Republican) 61.8%; ▌Thomas E. Martin (Democratic) 38.2%
Wisconsin 8	John W. Byrnes	Republican	1944	Incumbent re-elected.	▌ ✓ John W. Byrnes (Republican) 59.6%; ▌Cletus J. Johnson (Democratic) 40.4%
Wisconsin 9	None (district created)			New seat. Republican gain.	▌ ✓ Glenn Robert Davis (Republican) 55.3%; ▌James P. Buckley (Democratic) 44.7%
Wisconsin 10	Alvin O'Konski	Republican	1942	Incumbent re-elected.	▌ ✓ Alvin O'Konski (Republican) 56.2%; ▌Edmund A. Nix (Democratic) 43.8%

== Wyoming ==
District	Incumbent			This race	
District	Member	Party	First elected	Results	Candidates
Wyoming at-large	William Henry Harrison III	Republican	1950; 1954 (retired); 1960	Incumbent lost re-election. Democratic gain.	▌ ✓ Teno Roncalio (Democratic) 50.8%; ▌William Henry Harrison III (Republican) 49.2%

== See also ==
- 1964 United States elections
  - 1964 United States Senate elections
  - 1964 United States gubernatorial elections
- 88th United States Congress
- 89th United States Congress

== Works cited ==
- Abramson, Paul; Aldrich, John; Rohde, David (1995). Change and Continuity in the 1992 Elections. CQ Press. ISBN 0871878399.
