= Edith White =

Edith White may refer to:

- Edith White (painter) (1855–1946), American painter
- Edith White (politician) (1893 or 1894–1971), American politician, member of the Connecticut House of Representatives
- Edith Grace White (1890–1975), American zoologist
- Edith Alexandra White (1901–1988), Australian army matron
