= 1956 Pulitzer Prize =

Awards for journalism and related fields

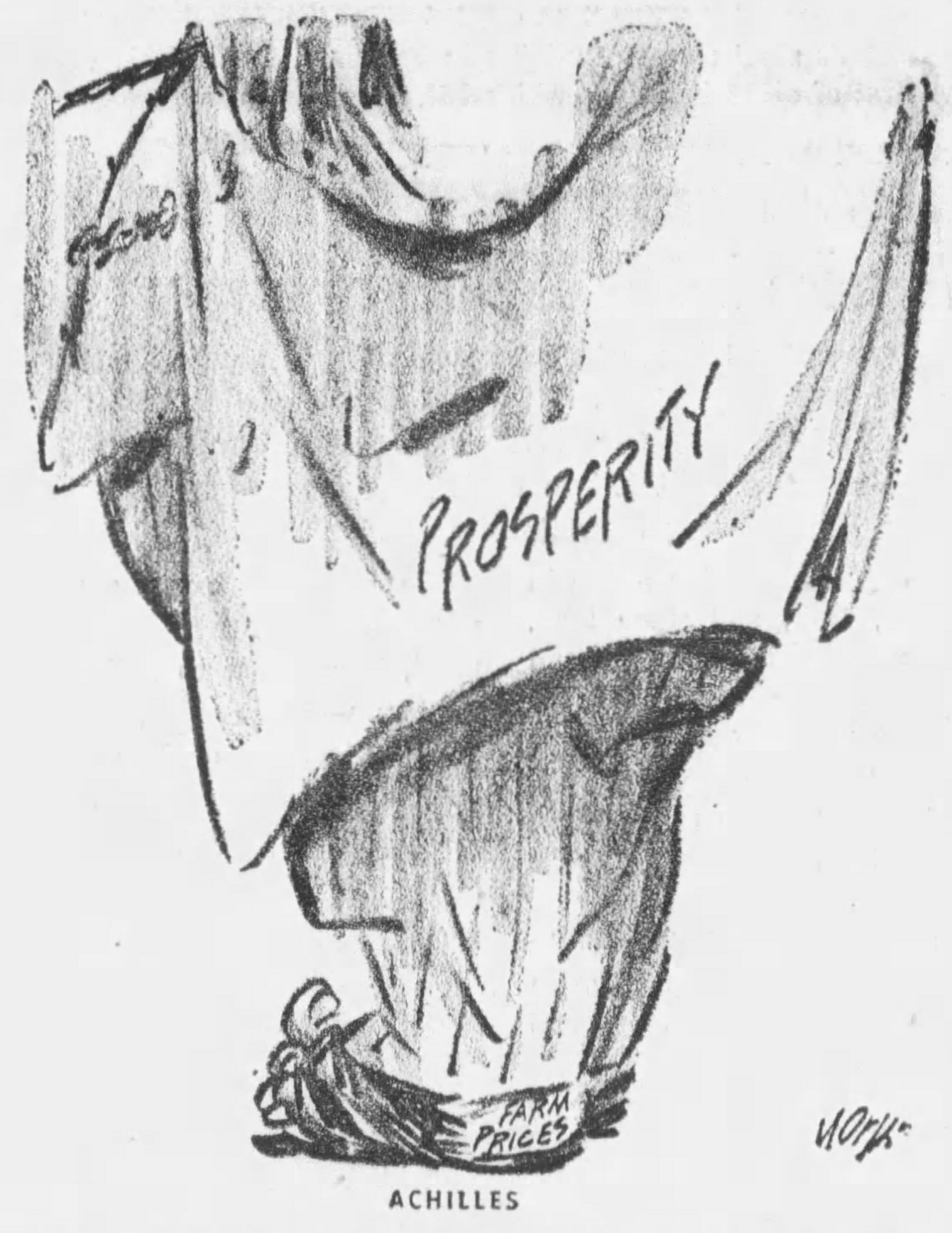
"Achilles", the prize-winning editorial cartoon

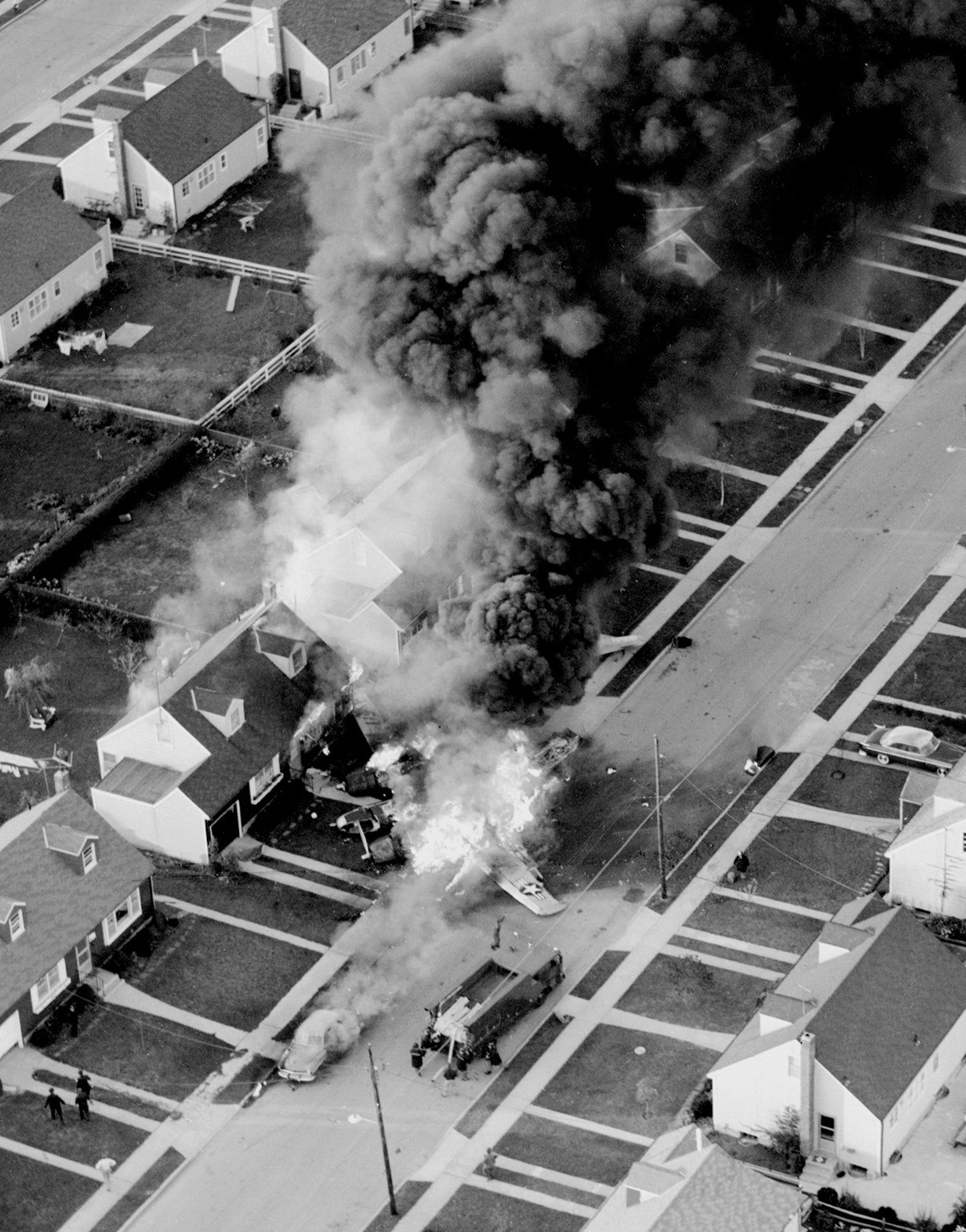
"Bomber Crashes in Street", cited as an outstanding example of the work of the Daily News staff

The following are the Pulitzer Prizes for 1956.

== Journalism awards ==
- Public Service:
  - Watsonville Register-Pajaronian for courageous exposure of corruption in public office, which led to the resignation of a district attorney and the conviction of one of his associates.
- Local Reporting, Edition Time:
  - Lee Hills of the Detroit Free Press for his aggressive, resourceful and comprehensive front page reporting of the United Auto Workers' negotiations with Ford and General Motors for a guaranteed annual wage.
- Local Reporting, No Edition Time:
  - Arthur Daley of The New York Times, for his outstanding coverage and commentary on the world of sports in his daily column, Sports of the Times.
- National Reporting:
  - Charles L. Bartlett of the Chattanooga Times, for his original disclosures that led to the resignation of Harold E. Talbott as Secretary of the Air Force.
- International Reporting:
  - William Randolph Hearst, Jr., J. Kingsbury-Smith, and Frank Conniff of the International News Service, for a series of exclusive interviews with the leaders of the Soviet Union.
- Editorial Writing:
  - Lauren K. Soth of the Des Moines Register and Tribune, for "If the Russians Want More Meat...", inviting a farm delegation from the Soviet Union to visit Iowa, which led directly to the Russian farm visit to the U.S.
- Editorial Cartooning:
  - Robert York of The Louisville Times, for his cartoon, "Achilles", showing a bulging figure of American prosperity tapering to a weak heel labeled "Farm Prices".
- Photography:
  - Staff of the New York Daily News, for its consistently excellent news picture coverage in 1955, an outstanding example of which is its photo, "Bomber Crashes in Street".

== Letters, Drama and Music Awards ==
- Fiction:
  - Andersonville by MacKinlay Kantor (World).
- Drama:
  - Diary of Anne Frank by Albert Hackett and Frances Goodrich (Random).
- History:
  - The Age of Reform by Richard Hofstadter (Knopf).
- Biography or Autobiography:
  - Benjamin Henry Latrobe by Talbot Faulkner Hamlin (Oxford Univ. Press)
- Poetry:
  - Poems - North & South by Elizabeth Bishop (Houghton).
- Music:
  - Symphony No. 3 by Ernst Toch (Mills), first performed by the Pittsburgh Symphony Orchestra, December 2, 1955.
