= Lucy Conniff =

American politician (1880–1954)

Member of the Connecticut House of Representatives from Danbury
- In office 1949–1953 Serving with Kennneth H. Hanna (1949–1951); John A. Define Jr. (1951–1953)
- Preceded by: Walter Scott; Arthur R. Tartaglia
- Succeeded by: Edith White; Nicholas A. Novaco

Personal details
- Born: November 4, 1880 Danbury, Connecticut, U.S.
- Died: May 23, 1954 (aged 73) Danbury, Connecticut, U.S.
- Party: Democratic
- Spouse: Andrew W. Conniff (m. 1900)
- Children: 5, including Frank Conniff
- Relatives: Frank Conniff Jr. (grandson)

Lucy Conniff (November 4, 1880 – May 23, 1954) was an American politician who served in the Connecticut House of Representatives from 1949 to 1953, representing the city of Danbury as a Democrat.

== Personal life ==
Conniff was born on November 4, 1880, in Danbury, Connecticut. She married Andrew W. Conniff on November 26, 1900, and they had five children together, including journalist Frank Conniff, who won the Pulitzer Prize for International Reporting in 1956. Actor and comedian Frank Conniff Jr., best known for his work on Mystery Science Theater 3000, is her grandson.

== Political career ==
Conniff was first elected to the Connecticut House of Representatives in 1948, and she served two terms representing the city of Danbury as a Democrat. She served her first term alongside Republican Kenneth H. Hanna, and the second alongside fellow Democrat John A. Define Jr. In April 1952, Conniff announced that she would not run for a third term and was retiring from politics.

== Death ==
Conniff died on May 23, 1954, at Danbury Hospital in Danbury, Connecticut. She was 73.
