= North Dakota's 2nd congressional district =

Coordinates: 46°49′N 100°47′W

- Obsolete district
- Created: 1910; 1960
- Eliminated: 1930; 1970
- Years active: 1913-1933; 1963-1973

North Dakota's 2nd congressional district is an obsolete congressional district in the state of North Dakota that was created by reapportionments in 1913, and eliminated by the reapportionments in 1933. North Dakota elected its two Representatives in a two-member at large district from 1932 to 1960, but then resurrected single-member districts in 1962. The district was eliminated by the reapportionment as a result of the 1970 redistricting cycle after the 1970 United States census. The seat was last filled from 1971 to 1973 by Arthur A. Link, who sought the office of Governor of North Dakota after not being able to run again for the defunct seat.

== Boundaries ==
When existing between 1913 and 1933, the district included the capital Bismarck and consisted of the following counties of central North Dakota: Bottineau, Rolette, McHenry, Pierce, Benson, Sheridan, Wells, Eddy, Foster, Griggs, Stutsman, Barnes, Kidder, Burleigh, Emmons, Logan, McIntosh, LaMoure, and Dickey.

The 1963 recreation was different, consisting of the western half of the state, again including Bismarck. It contained the following counties: Bottineau, McHenry, Sheridan, Wells, Kidder, Burleigh, Emmons, Logan, McIntosh, Divide, Burke, Renville, Ward, Mountrail, Williams, McKenzie, McLean, Dunn, Mercer, Oliver, Billings, Stark, Morton, Hettinger, Bowman, Adams, Golden Valley, Grant, Slope and Sioux.

== List of members representing the district ==
Member	Party	Years	Cong ress	Electoral history
District established March 4, 1913
George M. Young (Valley City)	Republican	March 4, 1913 – September 2, 1924	63rd 64th 65th 66th 67th 68th	Elected in 1912. Re-elected in 1914. Re-elected in 1916. Re-elected in 1918. Re-elected in 1920. Re-elected in 1922. Resigned to become judge of the U.S. Customs Court.
Vacant		September 2, 1924 – November 4, 1924	68th	
Thomas Hall (Bismarck)	Republican	November 4, 1924 – March 3, 1933	68th 69th 70th 71st 72nd	Elected to finish Young's term. Re-elected in 1924; Re-elected in 1926; Re-elected in 1928; Re-elected in 1930; Redistricted to the at-large district and lost renomination.
District dissolved January 3, 1933
District re-established January 3, 1963
Don L. Short (Medora)	Republican	January 3, 1963 – January 3, 1965	88th	Redistricted from the at-large district and re-elected in 1962. Lost re-election.
Rolland W. Redlin (Crosby)	Democratic–NPL	January 3, 1965 – January 3, 1967	89th	Elected in 1964. Lost re-election.
Thomas S. Kleppe (Bismarck)	Republican	January 3, 1967 – January 3, 1971	90th 91st	Elected in 1966. Re-elected in 1968. Retired to run for U.S. Senator.
Arthur A. Link (Alexander)	Democratic–NPL	January 3, 1971 – January 3, 1973	92nd	Elected in 1970. Retired to run for Governor of North Dakota.
District dissolved January 3, 1973

== Election results ==
Year	Candidate	Party	Votes	%
1912 (63rd Congress)	George M. Young	Republican	16,912	64.3
1912 (63rd Congress)	J. A. Minckler	Democratic	7,426	28.2
1912 (63rd Congress)	John A. Yoder	Socialist	1,922	7.3
1914 (63rd Congress)	George M. Young	Republican	18,680	68.4
1914 (63rd Congress)	James J. Weeks	Democratic	7,073	25.9
1914 (63rd Congress)	N. H. Bjornstad	Socialist	1,553	5.7
1916 (65th Congress)	George M. Young	Republican	22,227	71.7
1916 (65th Congress)	Hugh McDonald	Democratic	7,638	24.6
1916 (65th Congress)	Samuel O. Olson	Independent	1,150	3.7
1918 (66th Congress)	George M. Young	Republican	20,516	74.5
1918 (66th Congress)	L. N. Torson	Democratic	7,038	25.5
1920 (67th Congress)	George M. Young	Republican	34,849	51.7
1920 (67th Congress)	Ole H. Olson	NPL	32,618	48.4
1922 (68th Congress)	George M. Young	Republican	36,528	69.8
1922 (68th Congress)	J. W. Deemy	Progressive	15,834	30.2
Special election (68th Congress)	Thomas Hall	Republican	33,460	51.0
Special election (68th Congress)	Gerald P. Nye	NPL	32,205	49.0
1924 (69th Congress)	Thomas Hall	Republican	31,212	42.2
1924 (69th Congress)	Gerald P. Nye	NPL	28,193	38.1
1924 (69th Congress)	M. C. Freercks	Independent	14,511	19.6
1926 (70th Congress)	Thomas Hall	Republican	33,607	66.3
1926 (70th Congress)	J. L. Page	Democratic	13,635	27.1
1926 (70th Congress)	C. W. Reichert	Farmer-Labor	3,350	6.6
1928 (71st Congress)	Thomas Hall	Republican	42,844	61.7
1928 (71st Congress)	J. L. Page	Democratic	26,566	38.3
1930 (72nd Congress)	Thomas Hall	Republican	34,063	55.6
1930 (72nd Congress)	P. W. Lanier	Democratic	25,780	42.3
1930 (72nd Congress)	Alfred B. Knutson	Communist	1,304	2.1

=== Recreated in 1962 ===
Year	Candidate	Party	Votes	%
1962 (88th Congress)	Don L. Short	Republican	56,203	54.0
1962 (88th Congress)	Robert Vogel	D-NPL	47,825	46.0
1964 (89th Congress)	Rolland Redlin	D-NPL	60,751	52.5
1964 (89th Congress)	Don L. Short	Republican	54,878	47.5
1966 (90th Congress)	Thomas S. Kleppe	Republican	50,801	51.9
1966 (90th Congress)	Rolland Redlin	D-NPL	46,993	48.1
1968 (91st Congress)	Thomas S. Kleppe	Republican	55,962	49.9
1968 (91st Congress)	Rolland Redlin	D-NPL	54,655	48.7
1968 (91st Congress)	Russell Kleppe	Independent	1,526	1.4
1970 (92nd Congress)	Arthur A. Link	D-NPL	50,416	50.3
1970 (92nd Congress)	Robert McCarney	Republican	49,888	49.7
