= Frances McGovern =

American politician

Frances McGovern (April 18, 1927 – February 6, 2004) was a member of the Ohio House of Representatives and the Public Utilities Commission of Ohio. She was born in Akron, Ohio and lived there all of her life. She was a lawyer by trade, working in both private practice and in the legal department of Ohio Edison (now FirstEnergy). After retirement, she wrote two books, Written on the Hills, which dealt with the geographical history of Akron, and Fun, Cheap, and Easy, where she told about her life in politics.
