= Edith White (painter) =

American painter

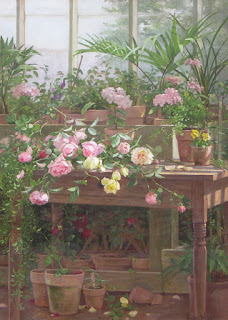
Roses in the Sunroom

Edith White (March 29, 1855 – January 19, 1946) was an American painter known for her renditions of flowers, especially roses, as well as landscapes. White was born in Decorah, Iowa, to a Quaker family and grew up in northern California. She studied at Mills Seminary in Oakland and the California School of Design in San Francisco before opening a studio in Los Angeles in 1882. In 1892 she moved to New York to study at the Art Students League, returning to California in 1893. She settled in Southern California, assisted in the establishment of the Pasadena Art Association, and moved to Point Loma in 1902, where she would spend over 30 years painting and teaching at the Theosophical Society. She died in Berkeley at the age of 91.
