= Robert York =

American cartoonist

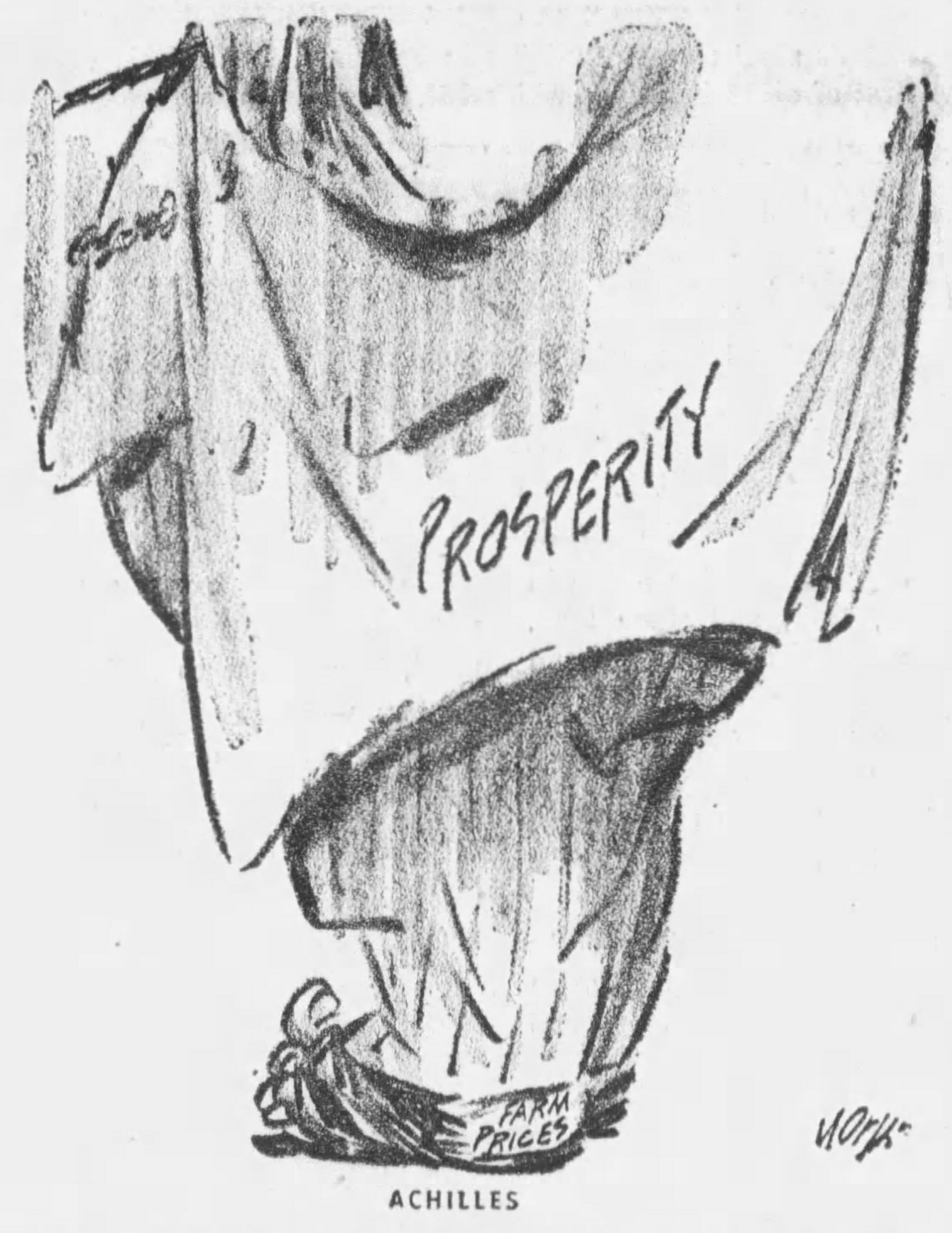
"Achilles", for which York received the 1956 Pulitzer Prize for Editorial Cartooning

Robert York (23 August 1909 — 21 May 1975) was an American cartoonist from 1930 to 1974. York began working for the Chicago Tribune and Nashville Banner throughout the 1930s before joining the Louisville Times in 1937. As a political cartoonist, York spent the majority of his career with Louisville apart from a stint with the United States Army Air Forces during World War II. York won the 1956 Pulitzer Prize for Editorial Cartooning for his newspaper cartoon "Achilles" and retired from cartoons in August 1974.

== Early life and education ==
On 23 August 1909, York was born in Minneapolis, Minnesota and grew up in Des Moines, Iowa. For his post-secondary education, York went to Drake University and the Cummings School of Art during the late 1920s. He continued his art education in 1930 when he enrolled in the Chicago Academy of Fine Arts. While completing his studies, York was trained by various people including Ding Darling and Vaughn Shoemaker.

== Career ==
York began working in cartoons with the Chicago Tribune as an assistant cartoonist for Carl Ed from 1930 to 1935. He then became a cartoonist for the Nashville Banner in 1936 and The Louisville Times in 1937. While with the Louisville Times, York worked as a political cartoonist from 1937 to 1974 with the exception of World War II. During the war, York drew with the United States Army Air Forces from 1943 to 1945. He retired from cartoons in August 1974.

== Awards and honors ==
In 1956, York was awarded the Pulitzer Prize for Editorial Cartooning for the cartoon "Achilles".

== Personal life ==
York was married and had one child.

== Death ==
York died on 21 May 1975 in Louisville, Kentucky.
