= The Louisville Times =

- Type: Daily newspaper
- Format: Broadsheet
- Owner(s): Haldeman family, 1884-1918; Bingham Family, 1918-May 1986; Gannett, May 1986-February 14, 1987
- Publisher: Barry Bingham to April 1986; Gannett, April 1986-February 14, 1987
- Editor: Michael Gartner
- Founded: 1884
- Ceased publication: February 14, 1987
- Language: English
- Headquarters: 525 West Broadway; Louisville, Kentucky; United States
- Circulation: 118,226 (1986)

The Louisville Times was a newspaper that was published in Louisville, Kentucky. It was founded in 1884 by Walter N. Haldeman, as the afternoon counterpart to The Courier-Journal, the dominant morning newspaper in Louisville and the commonwealth of Kentucky for many years. The two newspapers published a combined edition (as the Courier-Journal & Times) on Sundays. Both newspapers were later owned and operated by the Bingham family, headed for much of the 20th century by patriarch Barry Bingham, Sr.

The Times, which operated in the shadows of "The C-J" during most of its existence, nevertheless was a testing ground for many new ideas, usually involving design and typography. Another experiment under publisher Barry Bingham, Jr. was the idea of signed editorials. But like many other afternoon newspapers in America, circulation dwindled over the years as readers' lifestyles changed and television newscasts became more popular.

In May 1986, the Times and the Courier-Journal were purchased by Gannett. At the time of purchase, the Times had a circulation of about 125,000, versus the Courier-Journal daily circulation rate of about 175,000 and Sunday rate of 323,000. By January 1987, it was announced that the publication of the Times would cease in favor of afternoon editions of the Courier-Journal. The last issue of the Times was published on Saturday, February 14, 1987.

== Pulitzer Prize ==
- 1956: Editorial Cartooning, Robert York, for "Achilles"

== See also ==
- History of Louisville, Kentucky
- List of newspapers in Kentucky
