= Don L. Short =

American politician (1903–1982)

Don Levingston Short
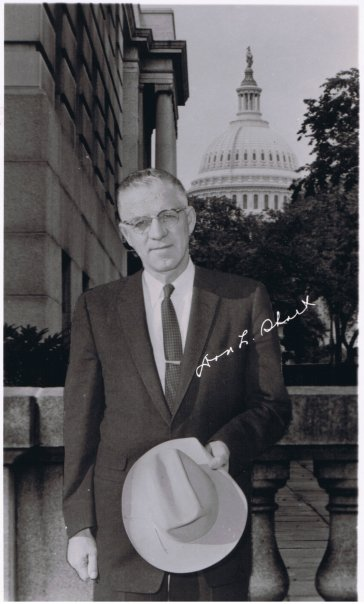

Member of the U.S. House of Representatives from North Dakota
- In office January 3, 1959 – January 3, 1965
- Preceded by: Otto Krueger
- Succeeded by: Rolland W. Redlin
- Constituency: At-large (1959–1963); 2nd district (1963–1965)

Personal details
- Born: June 22, 1903 Le Mars, Iowa, U.S.
- Died: May 10, 1982 (aged 78) Dickinson, North Dakota, U.S.
- Party: Republican
- Spouse: Edith
- Children: Anne Johnson, Connie McDonald, Con Short, Susan Williams
- Education: Montana State College at Bozeman 1918–1919; Pilsbury Military Academy 1921; University of Minnesota 1922–1926
- Occupation: Cattle rancher

Don Levingston Short (June 22, 1903 – May 10, 1982) was a cattle rancher and politician from Billings County, North Dakota. His career in politics reached its pinnacle when he was elected as a U.S. representative in 1958, and was a member of the United States Congress from January 3, 1959, to January 3, 1965.

== Biography ==
Don L. Short was born June 22, 1903, in Le Mars, Iowa, to Hugh Connoran and Anne Otely Corkery Short. Less than a year later the family moved to North Dakota and what would become the Short Ranch. The ranch is located in Billings County, North Dakota; near the town of Medora where Short attended public schools. He also attended the St. James School in Faribault, Minnesota, and an agricultural short course at Montana State University at Bozeman. Short graduated from Pillsbury Military Academy, Owatonna, Minnesota, in 1921; and was a student at the University of Minnesota from 1922 to 1926, where he joined Phi Kappa Psi. After attending college he returned to the Short Ranch. In 1929 he married Edith Esther Whittemore, a Medora school teacher. He made his living as a cattle rancher and farmer.

Don and Edith ran the ranch with their son Con Short (Buzzie) until the former congressman's health failed in his late 70s. He developed Alzheimer's in his last few years and became more and more uncomfortable outside of Beach, ND. He was a long-time resident of Beach. He greatly enjoyed driving back and forth from Beach to the ranch in his later years to check on cattle and crops, until his death in Dickinson, N.D., on May 10, 1982. He was interred in the scenic Medora Cemetery, Medora. His gravestone is inscribed COWBOY, and sits on the top of a bluff overlooking town of Medora, next to the Medora Musical outdoor theater.

While in Washington, D.C. he became friends with George H. W. Bush and Richard Nixon in his time in the House of Representatives. He was remembered by North Dakota political writer Darrell Dorgan, brother of Senator Byron Dorgan, as one of the last true statesmen after his death in 1982..

=== Politics ===
Short began his career in politics as a County Supervisor for the Farm Security Administration from 1937 to 1938. In 1957 he became a member of the North Dakota House of Representatives. As a Republican candidate in 1958 he was elected as a member of the United States House of Representatives. He took office January 3, 1959, representing Dakota's 1st congressional district. He was a member of the Eighty-sixth, Eighty-seventh, and Eighty-eighth Congresses. He was an unsuccessful candidate for reelection in 1964 to the Eighty-ninth Congress. His defeat was attributed to the efforts of Senator Milton Young (a North Dakota Republican Senator). Young actively and covertly worked to have Short defeated even refusing to endorse Short as he had eagerly had given his support in previous elections. During his time in the House, Short voted in favor of the Civil Rights Act of 1960, but voted against the Civil Rights Act of 1964. Two years later, Short was asked to run for Congress again, but declined as he had moved back to tend to the ranch.

The nature of Don Short's and Milt Young's dispute was money versus stewardship. Milt Young and Don Short disagreed about the need for a highway through an unspoiled piece of America's scenic national treasure, The Badlands. Short voted against building a US highway through the National Grasslands. Young disagreed with him. Short's efforts won in the long run as no US highway was ever built and the land remains unspoiled and pristine.

U.S. House of Representatives
Preceded by Otto Krueger	Member of the U.S. House of Representatives from North Dakota's at-large congressional district 1959–1963	Succeeded by None; seat abolished
Preceded by New district	Member of the U.S. House of Representatives from North Dakota's 2nd congressional district 1963–1965	Succeeded by Rolland W. Redlin
