= Frank Conniff (journalist) =

American journalist

- Born: April 24, 1914; Danbury, Connecticut, U.S.
- Died: May 25, 1971 (aged 57); New York City, U.S.
- Occupations: Journalist, editor
- Years active: 1956–1971
- Children: Frank Conniff
- Parent: Lucy Conniff
- Awards: Pulitzer Prize for International Reporting

Frank Conniff (/kɒnˈnɪf/ kon-NIF; April 24, 1914 – May 25, 1971) was an American journalist and editor who won a Pulitzer Prize for International Reporting in 1956.

== Biography ==
Conniff was born in Danbury, Connecticut, on April 24, 1914, to Andrew and Lucy Conniff. His first newspaper job was as a copyboy with the Danbury News-Times. He went to college at the University of Virginia, and after covering sports for one year in Danbury, joined Hearst Newspapers in New York. He was also a combat reporter during World War II in Africa and Europe, and covered the Korean War in 1950–51. In 1958 he became general director of the Hearst Headline Service, which provided news features, and contributed a Washington column. In New York he later wrote the "Conniff's Corner" column. While Hearst would introduce Conniff as their "house Democrat," Conniff also supported Joseph McCarthy, as Hearst Newspapers were a McCarthy supporter. He unsuccessfully challenged Republican Congressman Ogden Reid of New York's 26th congressional district in the 1964 election.

Conniff interviewed Nikita S. Khrushchev, premier of the Soviet Union, in Moscow in 1955 for Hearst's International News Service, earning him a 1956 Pulitzer Prize, which he shared with William Randolph Hearst, Jr. and Joseph Kingsbury Smith for a series of exclusive interviews with leaders of the Soviet Union. (In 1959 Smith became publisher of the New York Journal-American.)

Conniff was editor of Hearst Newspapers's World Journal Tribune of New York from 1966 to 1967, when the newspaper ceased publication. He was also national editor of Hearst Newspapers. He had a stroke shortly after the close of the World Journal Tribune from which he partly recovered.

He was a regular panelist on the NBC game show, Who Said That?, along with H. V. Kaltenborn, Peggy Ann Garner, Deems Taylor, and Boris Karloff.

Conniff died of a heart attack at age 57 in New York on May 25, 1971.

His son Frank Jr. is a comedic actor and writer.
