= Edith White (politician) =

American politician (died 1971)

Member of the Connecticut House of Representatives from Danbury
- In office 1953–1955 Serving with Nicholas A. Novaco
- Preceded by: Lucy Conniff; John A. Define Jr.
- Succeeded by: John M. Lewis; Louis J. DePaul

Personal details
- Born: Edith Adora Leech; 1893 or 1894 Bridgeport, Connecticut, U.S.
- Died: March 12, 1971 (aged 77) Sarasota, Florida, U.S.
- Party: Republican
- Spouse(s): Joseph Bunce Harris (m. 1916; div. 1930) Asa B. White (died 1961)
- Children: 1

Edith Adora White (1893 or 1894 – March 12, 1971) was an American politician who served in the Connecticut House of Representatives from 1953 to 1955, representing the city of Danbury as a Republican.

== Personal life ==
Edith Adora Leech was born in Bridgeport, Connecticut, in 1893 or 1894. She married Joseph Bunce Harris in 1916, and they had a son, Joseph Harris. The two divorced in 1930, and Leech later married Asa B. White. Around 1961, the Whites purchased a home in Sarasota, Florida, intending to move there after Asa retired in October 1961. Asa died on July 8, 1961, and Edith moved to the Florida home herself.

== Political career ==
A Republican, White was elected to the Connecticut House of Representatives in 1952. She served one term representing the city of Danbury alongside fellow Republican Nicholas A. Novaco. White did not seek reelection in 1954.

== Death ==
White died on March 12, 1971, in Sarasota, Florida. She was 77.
