= Rolland W. Redlin =

American politician

Rollie Redlin
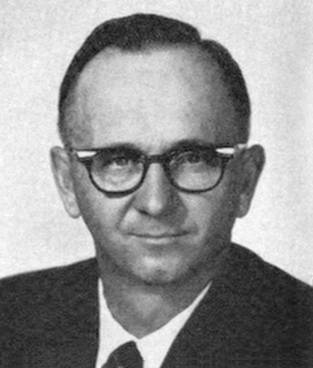

Member of the North Dakota Senate
- In office January 9, 1973 – December 5, 2000
- Preceded by: Wayne Sanstead
- Succeeded by: Ben Tollefson
- Constituency: 5th district (1973–1983); 40-50th district (1983–1993); 38th district (1993–2000)
- In office January 6, 1959 – January 3, 1965
- Constituency: 40th district

Member of the U.S. House of Representatives from North Dakota's 2nd district
- In office January 3, 1965 – January 3, 1967
- Preceded by: Don L. Short
- Succeeded by: Thomas S. Kleppe

Personal details
- Born: Rolland William Redlin; February 29, 1920 Lambert, Montana
- Died: September 23, 2011 (aged 91) Rapid City, South Dakota
- Party: Democratic
- Spouse: Christine Nesje (m. 1946)
- Education: University of Washington; Minot State University

Rolland William Redlin (February 29, 1920 – September 23, 2011) was a U.S. representative from North Dakota, who served between 1965 and 1967. He also served in the North Dakota Senate from 1959 to 1963 and later returned to serve again from 1973 until his retirement in 2000, as Senate President Pro Tempore 1987–9, and Minority Leadership later during his final 27 years' service. A member of the Democratic-NPL, he lived near Minot, North Dakota until 2009, when he moved to Rapid City, SD, to be closer to family members.

In 1964, he ran for the U.S. House of Representatives and won, unseating incumbent Republican Don L. Short. He was the first Democratic Representative to represent Western North Dakota. In 1966, he was defeated for reelection by former Bismarck Mayor Thomas Kleppe. Redlin ran again in 1968 but lost by a narrow margin. He has stated his vote for the 1965 Voting Rights Act was the accomplishment while serving in the US House of Representatives of which he is most proud, and that the breakdown of civil discourse in American politics during the past two decades is perhaps his greatest disappointment.

Redlin died on September 23, 2011, at his home in Rapid City. He was 91.

U.S. House of Representatives
Preceded by Don L. Short	Member of the U.S. House of Representatives from North Dakota's 2nd congressional district 1965–1967	Succeeded by Thomas S. Kleppe
