= 1960 United States House of Representatives elections =

House elections for the 87th U.S. Congress

- November 8, 1960

All 437 seats in the United States House of Representatives 219 seats needed for a majority
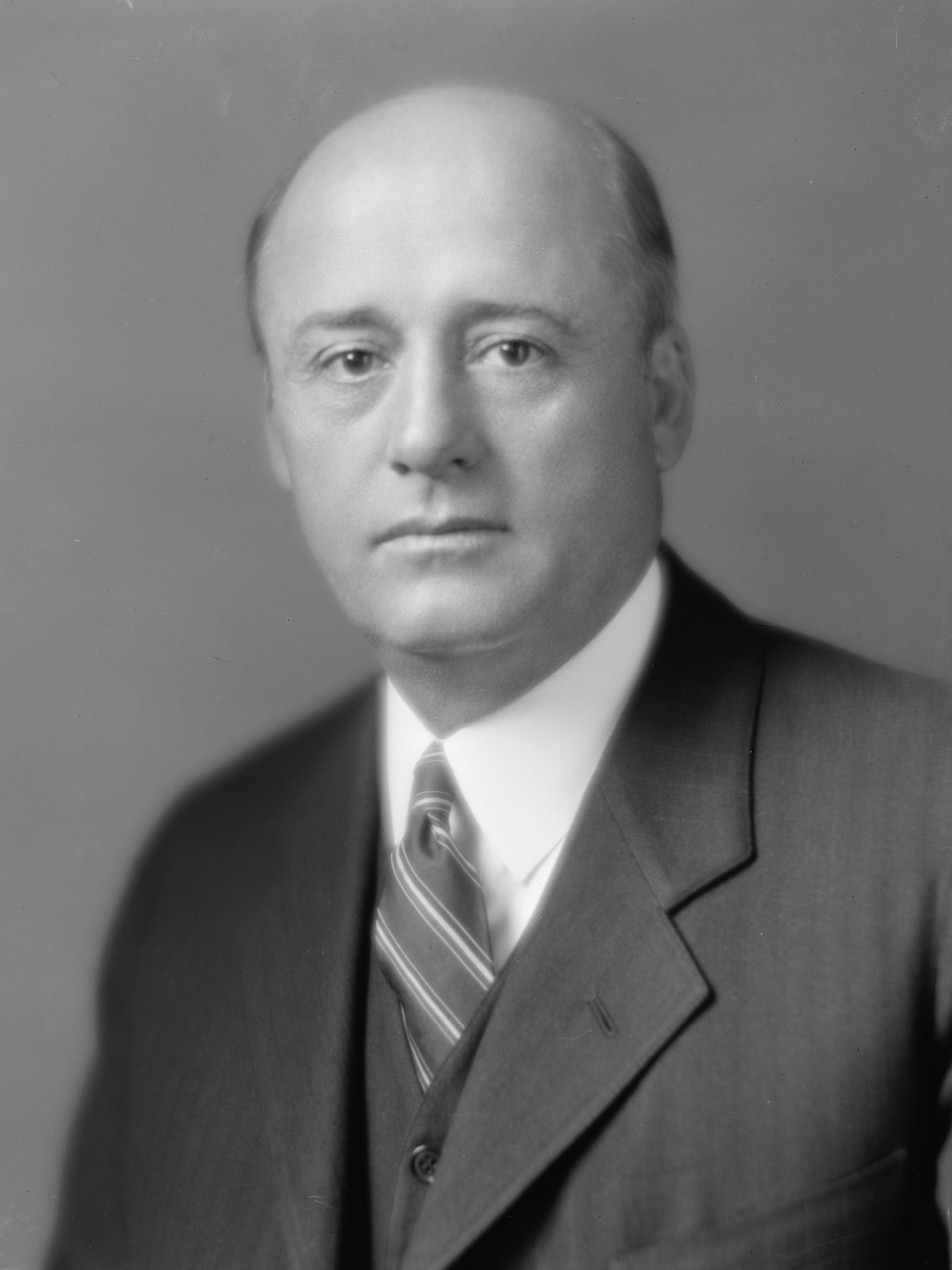

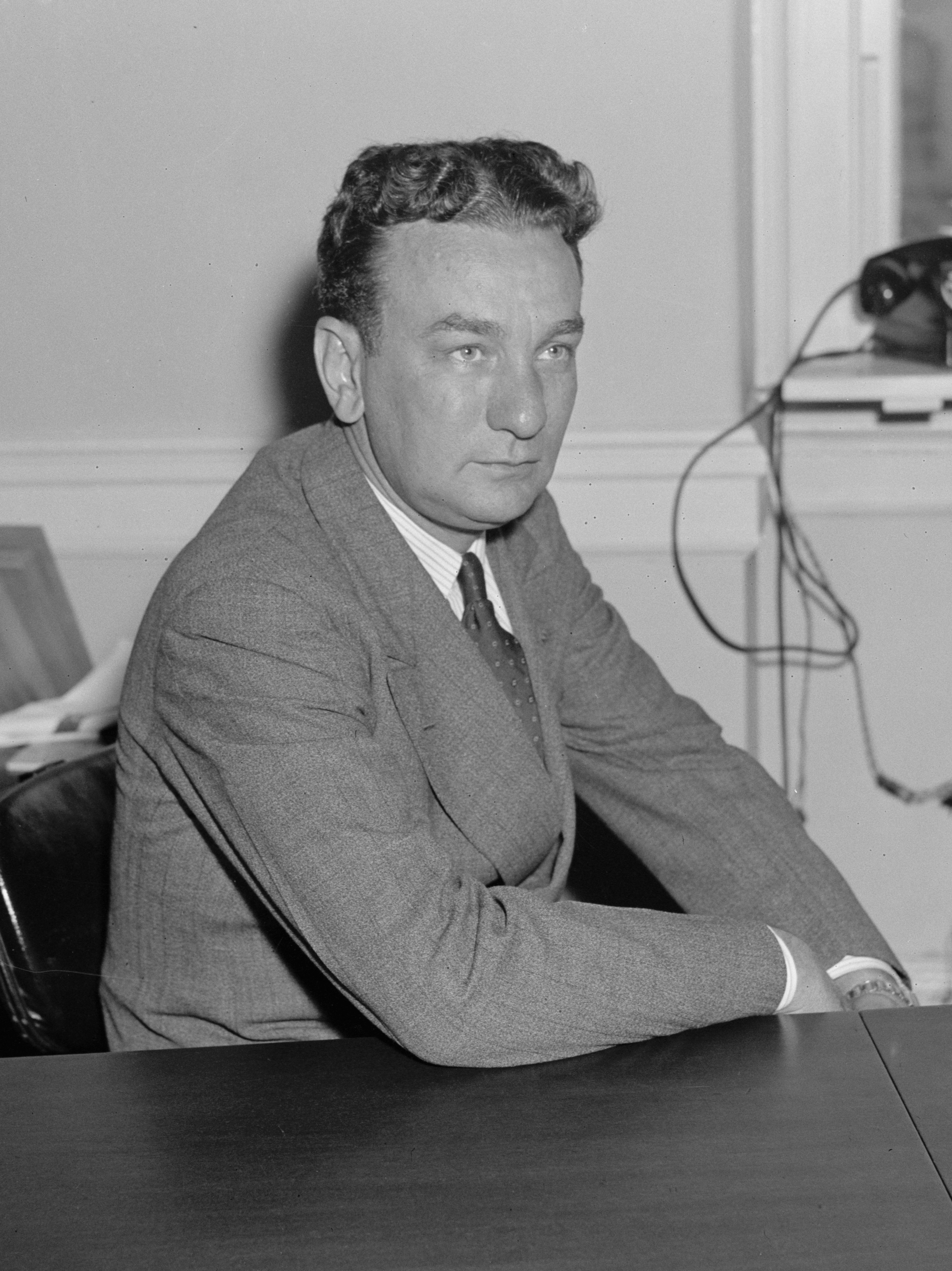
	Majority party	Minority party
Leader	Sam Rayburn	Charles A. Halleck
Party	Democratic	Republican
Leader since	September 16, 1940	January 3, 1959
Leader's seat	Texas 4th	Indiana 2nd
Last election	283 seats	153 seats
Seats won	262	175
Seat change	▼21	▲22
Popular vote	35,125,032	28,750,866
Percentage	54.8%	44.8%
Swing	▼1.2pp	▲1.2pp
- Results: Democratic hold Democratic gain Republican hold Republican gain
Speaker before election
Sam Rayburn
Democratic
Elected Speaker
Sam Rayburn
Democratic

The 1960 United States House of Representatives elections were held on November 8, 1960, to elect members to serve in the 87th United States Congress. They coincided with the election of President John F. Kennedy. This was the first house election to feature all 50 current U.S. states.

There were 437 seats, the most in U.S. history: 435 from the reapportionment in accordance with the 1950 census, and one seat for each of the new states of Alaska and Hawaii.

Although Democrats retained control, it was the last time until 1988 that a victorious presidential candidate lost seats in the House.

This is the last House election cycle in which no new female representatives were elected to the House. Since the death of 1996 Republican presidential nominee Bob Dole in 2021, this is also the latest House election cycle where all first-elected members are deceased.

== Overall results ==
405 incumbent members sought reelection, but 5 were defeated in primaries and 25 defeated in the general election for a total of 375 incumbents winning.

↓
262	175
Democratic	Republican

Parties	Seats				Popular vote		
Parties	1958	1960	Change	Strength	Vote	%	Change
Democratic	283	262	▼21	60.0%	35,125,032	54.8%	▼1.2%
Republican	153	175	▲22	40.0%	28,750,866	44.8%	▲1.2%
Liberal	0	0	Steady	Steady	126,332	0.2%	Steady
Constitution	0	0	Steady	Steady	61,506	0.1%	▲0.1%
Conservative	0	0	Steady	Steady	15,502	<0.1%	Steady
Social Democratic	0	0	Steady	Steady	12,700	<0.1%	Steady
Socialist Labor	0	0	Steady	Steady	8,166	<0.1%	Steady
Prohibition	0	0	Steady	Steady	4,841	<0.1%	Steady
Independent Anti-Tax	0	0	Steady	Steady	1,851	<0.1%	Steady
Independent	0	0	Steady	Steady	1,394	<0.1%	▼0.1%
Independent American	0	0	Steady	Steady	892	<0.1%	Steady
Tax Cut	0	0	Steady	Steady	363	<0.1%	Steady
Others	0	0	Steady	Steady	14,865	<0.1%	▼0.1%
Total	436	437	▲1	100.0%	64,124,310	100.0%	Steady

Source: Election Statistics - Office of the Clerk

Popular vote
Democratic	54.77%
Republican	44.84%
Others	0.39%

House seats
Democratic	59.95%
Republican	40.05%

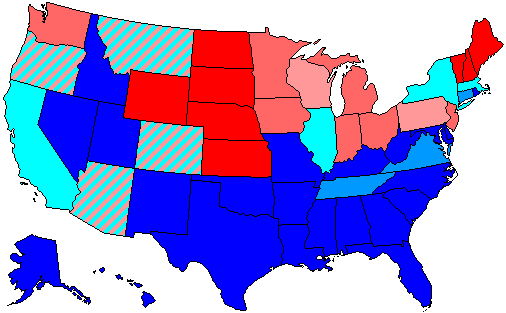
House seats by party holding plurality in state: 80+% Democratic / 80+% Republican; 60+% to 80% Democratic / 60+% to 80% Republican; Up to 60% Democratic / Up to 60% Republican

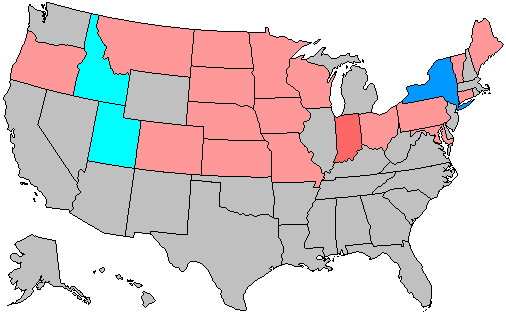
Change in house seats by party: 6+ Democratic gain / 6+ Republican gain; 3-5 Democratic gain / 3-5 Republican gain; 1-2 Democratic gain / 1-2 Republican gain; No net change

== Special elections ==
In these special elections, the winner was seated during 1960 or before January 3, 1961; ordered by election date, then state, then district.

District	Incumbent			This race	
District	Member	Party	First elected	Results	Candidates
New York 23	Isidore Dollinger	Democratic	1948	Incumbent resigned December 31, 1959 to become Bronx County District Attorney. New member elected March 8, 1960. Democratic hold. Winner was subsequently re-elected in November; see below.	▌ ✓ Jacob H. Gilbert (Democratic) 82.4%; ▌Simon M. Koenig (Republican) 10.3%; ▌Hector Mathew (Liberal) 7.4%
Pennsylvania 17	Alvin Bush	Republican	1950	Incumbent died November 3, 1959. New member elected April 26, 1960. Republican hold. Winner was subsequently re-elected in November; see below.	▌ ✓ Herman T. Schneebeli (Republican) 52.45%; ▌Dean R. Fisher (Democratic) 47.55%
Pennsylvania 18	Richard M. Simpson	Republican	1936	Incumbent died January 7, 1960. New member elected April 26, 1960. Republican hold. Winner died June 19, 1960, and the seat remained vacant until another special election in November; see below.	▌ ✓ Douglas Elliott (Republican) 61.2%; ▌Robert M. Meyers (Democratic) 38.8%
North Carolina 12	David McKee Hall	Democratic	1958	Incumbent died January 29, 1960. New member elected June 25, 1960. Democratic hold. Winner was subsequently re-elected in November; see below.	▌ ✓ Roy A. Taylor (Democratic) 98.6%; ▌Heinz Rollman (Republican) 1.4%
Ohio 6	James G. Polk	Democratic	1930; 1940 (retired); 1948	Incumbent died April 28, 1959. New member elected November 8, 1960. Republican gain. Winner was not a candidate the same day to the next term; see below.	▌ ✓ Ward Miller (Republican) 55.36%; ▌Gladys L. Davis (Democratic) 44.64%
Pennsylvania 18	Douglas Elliott	Republican	1960 (special)	Incumbent died June 19, 1960. New member elected November 8, 1960. Republican hold. Winner was also elected to the full term; see below.	▌ ✓ J. Irving Whalley (Republican) 61.3%; ▌Robert M. Meyers (Democratic) 38.1%
Washington 3	Russell V. Mack	Republican	1947 (special)	Incumbent died March 28, 1960. New member elected November 8, 1960. Democratic gain. Winner was also elected to the full term; see below.	▌ ✓ Julia Butler Hansen (Democratic) 53.4%; ▌Dale M. Nordquist (Republican) 46.6%

== Alabama ==
District	Incumbent			This race	
District	Member	Party	First elected	Results	Candidates
Alabama 1	Frank W. Boykin	Democratic	1935 (special)	Incumbent re-elected.	▌ ✓ Frank W. Boykin (Democratic); Uncontested
Alabama 2	George M. Grant	Democratic	1938	Incumbent re-elected.	▌ ✓ George M. Grant (Democratic); Uncontested
Alabama 3	George W. Andrews	Democratic	1944	Incumbent re-elected.	▌ ✓ George W. Andrews (Democratic); Uncontested
Alabama 4	Kenneth A. Roberts	Democratic	1950	Incumbent re-elected.	▌ ✓ Kenneth A. Roberts (Democratic); Uncontested
Alabama 5	Albert Rains	Democratic	1944	Incumbent re-elected.	▌ ✓ Albert Rains (Democratic); Uncontested
Alabama 6	Armistead I. Selden Jr.	Democratic	1952	Incumbent re-elected.	▌ ✓ Armistead I. Selden Jr. (Democratic); Uncontested
Alabama 7	Carl Elliott	Democratic	1948	Incumbent re-elected.	▌ ✓ Carl Elliott (Democratic); Uncontested
Alabama 8	Robert E. Jones Jr.	Democratic	1947 (special)	Incumbent re-elected.	▌ ✓ Robert E. Jones Jr. (Democratic) 79.2%; ▌H. G. Williams (Republican) 20.8%
Alabama 9	George Huddleston Jr.	Democratic	1954	Incumbent re-elected.	▌ ✓ George Huddleston Jr. (Democratic) 67.3%; ▌William P. Ivey (Republican) 32.7%

== Alaska ==
Borough results

District	Incumbent			This race	
District	Member	Party	First elected	Results	Candidates
Alaska at-large	Ralph Rivers	Democratic	1958	Incumbent re-elected.	▌ ✓ Ralph Rivers (Democratic) 56.8%; ▌R. L. Rettig (Republican) 43.2%

== Arizona ==
District	Incumbent			This race	
District	Member	Party	First elected	Results	Candidates
Arizona 1	John J. Rhodes	Republican	1952	Incumbent re-elected.	▌ ✓ John J. Rhodes (Republican) 59.2%; ▌Richard F. Harless (Democratic) 40.8%
Arizona 2	Stewart Udall	Democratic	1954	Incumbent re-elected.	▌ ✓ Stewart Udall (Democratic) 55.7%; ▌Mac C. Matheson (Republican) 44.3%

== Arkansas ==
District	Incumbent			This race	
District	Member	Party	First elected	Results	Candidates
Arkansas 1	Ezekiel C. Gathings	Democratic	1938	Incumbent re-elected.	▌ ✓ Ezekiel C. Gathings (Democratic); Uncontested
Arkansas 2	Wilbur Mills	Democratic	1938	Incumbent re-elected.	▌ ✓ Wilbur Mills (Democratic); Uncontested
Arkansas 3	James William Trimble	Democratic	1944	Incumbent re-elected.	▌ ✓ James William Trimble (Democratic); Uncontested
Arkansas 4	Oren Harris	Democratic	1940	Incumbent re-elected.	▌ ✓ Oren Harris (Democratic); Uncontested
Arkansas 5	Dale Alford	Democratic	1958	Incumbent re-elected.	▌ ✓ Dale Alford (Democratic) 82.7%; ▌L. J. Churchill (Republican) 17.3%
Arkansas 6	William F. Norrell	Democratic	1938	Incumbent re-elected.	▌ ✓ William F. Norrell (Democratic); Uncontested

== California ==
District	Incumbent			This race	
District	Member	Party	First elected	Results	Candidates
California 1	Clem Miller	Democratic	1958	Incumbent re-elected.	▌ ✓ Clem Miller (Democratic) 51.6%; ▌Frederick G. Dupuis (Republican) 48.4%
California 2	Harold T. Johnson	Democratic	1958	Incumbent re-elected.	▌ ✓ Harold T. Johnson (Democratic) 62.7%; ▌Fredric H. Nagel (Republican) 37.3%
California 3	John E. Moss	Democratic	1952	Incumbent re-elected.	▌ ✓ John E. Moss (Democratic); Uncontested
California 4	William S. Mailliard	Republican	1952	Incumbent re-elected.	▌ ✓ William S. Mailliard (Republican) 65.3%; ▌Phillips S. Davies (Democratic) 34.7%
California 5	John F. Shelley	Democratic	1949 (special)	Incumbent re-elected.	▌ ✓ John F. Shelley (Democratic) 83.7%; ▌Nick Verreos (Republican) 16.3%
California 6	John F. Baldwin Jr.	Republican	1954	Incumbent re-elected.	▌ ✓ John F. Baldwin Jr. (Republican) 58.7%; ▌Douglas R. Page (Democratic) 41.3%
California 7	Jeffery Cohelan	Democratic	1958	Incumbent re-elected.	▌ ✓ Jeffery Cohelan (Democratic) 57.0%; ▌Lewis F. Sherman (Republican) 43.0%
California 8	George P. Miller	Democratic	1944	Incumbent re-elected.	▌ ✓ George P. Miller (Democratic) 62.0%; ▌Robert E. Hannon (Republican) 38.0%
California 9	J. Arthur Younger	Republican	1952	Incumbent re-elected.	▌ ✓ J. Arthur Younger (Republican) 59.2%; ▌John D. Kaster (Democratic) 40.8%
California 10	Charles Gubser	Republican	1952	Incumbent re-elected.	▌ ✓ Charles Gubser (Republican) 58.9%; ▌Russell B. Bryan (Democratic) 41.1%
California 11	John J. McFall	Democratic	1956	Incumbent re-elected.	▌ ✓ John J. McFall (Democratic) 65.4%; ▌Clifford B. Bull (Republican) 34.6%
California 12	B. F. Sisk	Democratic	1954	Incumbent re-elected.	▌ ✓ B. F. Sisk (Democratic); Uncontested
California 13	Charles M. Teague	Republican	1954	Incumbent re-elected.	▌ ✓ Charles M. Teague (Republican) 65.0%; ▌L. Boyd Finch (Democratic) 35.0%
California 14	Harlan Hagen	Democratic	1952	Incumbent re-elected.	▌ ✓ Harlan Hagen (Democratic) 56.5%; ▌G. Ray Arnett (Republican) 43.5%
California 15	Gordon L. McDonough	Republican	1944	Incumbent re-elected.	▌ ✓ Gordon L. McDonough (Republican) 51.3%; ▌Norman H. Martell (Democratic) 48.7%
California 16	Donald L. Jackson	Republican	1946	Incumbent retired. Republican hold.	▌ ✓ Alphonzo E. Bell Jr. (Republican) 55.4%; ▌Jerry Pacht (Democratic) 44.6%
California 17	Cecil R. King	Democratic	1942	Incumbent re-elected.	▌ ✓ Cecil R. King (Democratic) 67.7%; ▌Tom Coffee (Republican) 32.3%
California 18	Craig Hosmer	Republican	1952	Incumbent re-elected.	▌ ✓ Craig Hosmer (Republican) 70.0%; ▌D. Patrick Ahern (Democratic) 30.0%
California 19	Chet Holifield	Democratic	1942	Incumbent re-elected.	▌ ✓ Chet Holifield (Democratic) 78.2%; ▌Gordon S. McWilliams (Republican) 21.8%
California 20	H. Allen Smith	Republican	1956	Incumbent re-elected.	▌ ✓ H. Allen Smith (Republican) 70.1%; ▌Gareth W. Sadler (Democratic) 29.9%
California 21	Edgar W. Hiestand	Republican	1952	Incumbent re-elected.	▌ ✓ Edgar W. Hiestand (Republican) 58.4%; ▌Rudd Brown (Democratic) 41.6%
California 22	Joseph F. Holt	Republican	1952	Incumbent retired. Democratic gain.	▌ ✓ James C. Corman (Democratic) 51.1%; ▌Lemoine Blanchard (Republican) 48.9%
California 23	Clyde Doyle	Democratic	1948	Incumbent re-elected.	▌ ✓ Clyde Doyle (Democratic) 74.2%; ▌Emmett A. Schwartz (Republican) 25.8%
California 24	Glenard P. Lipscomb	Republican	1953	Incumbent re-elected.	▌ ✓ Glenard P. Lipscomb (Republican) 59.7%; ▌Norman Hass (Democratic) 40.3%
California 25	George A. Kasem	Democratic	1958	Incumbent lost re-election. Republican gain.	▌ ✓ John H. Rousselot (Republican) 53.6%; ▌George A. Kasem (Democratic) 46.4%
California 26	James Roosevelt	Democratic	1954	Incumbent re-elected.	▌ ✓ James Roosevelt (Democratic) 73.4%; ▌William E. McIntyre (Republican) 26.6%
California 27	Harry R. Sheppard	Democratic	1936	Incumbent re-elected.	▌ ✓ Harry R. Sheppard (Democratic) 66.8%; ▌Robert M. Castle (Republican) 33.2%
California 28	James B. Utt	Republican	1952	Incumbent re-elected.	▌ ✓ James B. Utt (Republican) 60.9%; ▌Max E. Woods (Democratic) 39.1%
California 29	Dalip Singh Saund	Democratic	1956	Incumbent re-elected.	▌ ✓ Dalip Singh Saund (Democratic) 57.1%; ▌Charles H. Jameson (Republican) 42.9%
California 30	Bob Wilson	Republican	1952	Incumbent re-elected.	▌ ✓ Bob Wilson (Republican) 59.3%; ▌Walter Wencke (Democratic) 40.7%

== Colorado ==
District	Incumbent			This race	
District	Member	Party	First elected	Results	Candidates
Colorado 1	Byron G. Rogers	Democratic	1950	Incumbent re-elected.	▌ ✓ Byron G. Rogers (Democratic) 60.0%; ▌Robert D. Rolander (Republican) 40.0%
Colorado 2	Byron L. Johnson	Democratic	1958	Incumbent lost re-election. Republican gain.	▌ ✓ Peter H. Dominick (Republican) 57.6%; ▌Byron L. Johnson (Democratic) 42.4%
Colorado 3	John Chenoweth	Republican	1950	Incumbent re-elected.	▌ ✓ John Chenoweth (Republican) 52.0%; ▌Franklin R. Stewart (Democratic) 48.0%
Colorado 4	Wayne N. Aspinall	Democratic	1948	Incumbent re-elected.	▌ ✓ Wayne N. Aspinall (Democratic) 68.5%; ▌Charles P. Casteel (Republican) 31.5%

== Connecticut ==
District	Incumbent			This race	
District	Member	Party	First elected	Results	Candidates
Connecticut 1	Emilio Q. Daddario	Democratic	1958	Incumbent re-elected.	▌ ✓ Emilio Q. Daddario (Democratic) 58.5%; ▌Thomas F. Brennan (Republican) 41.5%
Connecticut 2	Chester B. Bowles	Democratic	1958	Incumbent retired. Republican gain.	▌ ✓ Horace Seely-Brown Jr. (Republican) 50.1%; ▌William St. Onge (Democratic) 49.9%
Connecticut 3	Robert Giaimo	Democratic	1958	Incumbent re-elected.	▌ ✓ Robert Giaimo (Democratic) 54.9%; ▌Albert W. Cretella (Republican) 45.1%
Connecticut 4	Donald J. Irwin	Democratic	1958	Incumbent lost re-election. Republican gain.	▌ ✓ Abner W. Sibal (Republican) 51.3%; ▌Donald J. Irwin (Democratic) 48.0%; ▌Jasper McLevy (Socialist Labor) 0.8%
Connecticut 5	John S. Monagan	Democratic	1958	Incumbent re-elected.	▌ ✓ John S. Monagan (Democratic) 55.1%; ▌James T. Patterson (Republican) 44.9%
Connecticut at-large	Frank Kowalski	Democratic	1958	Incumbent re-elected.	▌ ✓ Frank Kowalski (Democratic) 54.0%; ▌Antoni Sadlak (Republican) 46.0%

== Delaware ==
District	Incumbent			This race	
District	Member	Party	First elected	Results	Candidates
Delaware at-large	Harris McDowell	Democratic	1958	Incumbent re-elected.	▌ ✓ Harris McDowell (Democratic) 50.5%; ▌James T. McKinstry (Republican) 49.5%

== Florida ==
District	Incumbent			This race	
District	Member	Party	First elected	Results	Candidates
Florida 1	William C. Cramer	Republican	1954	Incumbent re-elected.	▌ ✓ William C. Cramer (Republican) 58.4%; ▌James M. McEwen (Democratic) 41.6%
Florida 2	Charles E. Bennett	Democratic	1948	Incumbent re-elected.	▌ ✓ Charles E. Bennett (Democratic) 82.5%; ▌J. Edward Musser (Republican) 17.5%
Florida 3	Bob Sikes	Democratic	1940; 1944 (resigned); 1944	Incumbent re-elected.	▌ ✓ Bob Sikes (Democratic); Uncontested
Florida 4	Dante Fascell	Democratic	1954	Incumbent re-elected.	▌ ✓ Dante Fascell (Democratic) 70.5%; ▌Hugh M. Tartaglia (Republican) 29.5%
Florida 5	Syd Herlong	Democratic	1948	Incumbent re-elected.	▌ ✓ Syd Herlong (Democratic); Uncontested
Florida 6	Paul Rogers	Democratic	1954	Incumbent re-elected.	▌ ✓ Paul Rogers (Democratic) 62.0%; ▌John D. Kruse (Republican) 38.0%
Florida 7	James A. Haley	Democratic	1952	Incumbent re-elected.	▌ ✓ James A. Haley (Democratic) 61.4%; ▌Henry S. Batholomew (Republican) 38.6%
Florida 8	D. R. Matthews	Democratic	1952	Incumbent re-elected.	▌ ✓ D. R. Matthews (Democratic); Uncontested

== Georgia ==
District	Incumbent			This race	
District	Member	Party	First elected	Results	Candidates
Georgia 1	Prince H. Preston Jr.	Democratic	1946	Incumbent lost renomination. Democratic hold.	▌ ✓ George Elliott Hagan (Democratic); Uncontested
Georgia 2	J. L. Pilcher	Democratic	1953	Incumbent re-elected.	▌ ✓ J. L. Pilcher (Democratic); Uncontested
Georgia 3	Tic Forrester	Democratic	1950	Incumbent re-elected.	▌ ✓ Tic Forrester (Democratic); Uncontested
Georgia 4	John Flynt	Democratic	1954	Incumbent re-elected.	▌ ✓ John Flynt (Democratic); Uncontested
Georgia 5	James C. Davis	Democratic	1946	Incumbent re-elected.	▌ ✓ James C. Davis (Democratic); Uncontested
Georgia 6	Carl Vinson	Democratic	1914	Incumbent re-elected.	▌ ✓ Carl Vinson (Democratic); Uncontested
Georgia 7	Harlan Mitchell	Democratic	1958	Retired to run for Georgia State Senator. Democratic hold.	▌ ✓ John William Davis (Democratic) 74.2%; ▌E. Ralph Ivey (Republican) 25.8%
Georgia 8	Iris Faircloth Blitch	Democratic	1954	Incumbent re-elected.	▌ ✓ Iris Faircloth Blitch (Democratic); Uncontested
Georgia 9	Phillip M. Landrum	Democratic	1952	Incumbent re-elected.	▌ ✓ Phillip M. Landrum (Democratic); Uncontested
Georgia 10	Paul Brown	Democratic	1933	Incumbent retired. Democratic hold.	▌ ✓ Robert Grier Stephens Jr. (Democratic); Uncontested

== Hawaii ==
District	Incumbent			This race	
District	Member	Party	First elected	Results	Candidates
Hawaii at-large	Daniel Inouye	Democratic	1959	Incumbent re-elected.	▌ ✓ Daniel Inouye (Democratic) 74.4%; ▌Frederick Titcomb (Republican) 25.6%

== Idaho ==
District	Incumbent			This race	
District	Member	Party	First elected	Results	Candidates
Idaho 1	Gracie Pfost	Democratic	1952	Incumbent re-elected.	▌ ✓ Gracie Pfost (Democratic) 60.4%; ▌Thomas A. Leupp (Republican) 39.6%
Idaho 2	Hamer H. Budge	Republican	1950	Incumbent lost re-election. Democratic gain.	▌ ✓ Ralph R. Harding (Democratic) 51.2%; ▌Hamer H. Budge (Republican) 48.8%

== Illinois ==
District	Incumbent			This race	
District	Member	Party	First elected	Results	Candidates
Illinois 1	William L. Dawson	Democratic	1942	Incumbent re-elected.	▌ ✓ William L. Dawson (Democratic) 77.8%; ▌Genoa S. Washington (Republican) 22.2%
Illinois 2	Barratt O'Hara	Democratic	1948; 1950 (lost); 1952	Incumbent re-elected.	▌ ✓ Barratt O'Hara (Democratic) 66.6%; ▌Bernard Epton (Republican) 33.4%
Illinois 3	William T. Murphy	Democratic	1958	Incumbent re-elected.	▌ ✓ William T. Murphy (Democratic) 59.1%; ▌Emmet Byrne (Republican) 40.9%
Illinois 4	Ed Derwinski	Republican	1958	Incumbent re-elected.	▌ ✓ Ed Derwinski (Republican) 55.9%; ▌Frank J. Sulewski (Democratic) 44.1%
Illinois 5	John C. Kluczynski	Democratic	1950	Incumbent re-elected.	▌ ✓ John C. Kluczynski (Democratic) 71.2%; ▌Edward J. Tomek (Republican) 28.8%
Illinois 6	Thomas J. O'Brien	Democratic	1942	Incumbent re-elected.	▌ ✓ Thomas J. O'Brien (Democratic) 71.7%; ▌Frank S. Estes (Republican) 28.3%
Illinois 7	Roland V. Libonati	Democratic	1957	Incumbent re-elected.	▌ ✓ Roland V. Libonati (Democratic) 80.5%; ▌Lawrence J. Blasi (Republican) 19.5%
Illinois 8	Dan Rostenkowski	Democratic	1958	Incumbent re-elected.	▌ ✓ Dan Rostenkowski (Democratic) 67.2%; ▌Henry Klinger Jr. (Republican) 32.8%
Illinois 9	Sidney R. Yates	Democratic	1948	Incumbent re-elected.	▌ ✓ Sidney R. Yates (Democratic) 60.0%; ▌Chester E. Emanuelson (Republican) 40.0%
Illinois 10	Harold R. Collier	Republican	1956	Incumbent re-elected.	▌ ✓ Harold R. Collier (Republican) 57.1%; ▌Edward Hanrahan (Democratic) 42.9%
Illinois 11	Roman Pucinski	Democratic	1958	Incumbent re-elected.	▌ ✓ Roman Pucinski (Democratic) 54.0%; ▌Timothy P. Sheehan (Republican) 46.0%
Illinois 12	Charles A. Boyle	Democratic	1954	Incumbent died November 4, 1959. Democratic hold.	▌ ✓ Edward R. Finnegan (Democratic) 50.8%; ▌Theodore P. Fields (Republican) 49.2%
Illinois 13	Marguerite S. Church	Republican	1950	Incumbent re-elected.	▌ ✓ Marguerite S. Church (Republican) 66.0%; ▌Tyler Thompson (Democratic) 34.0%
Illinois 14	Elmer J. Hoffman	Republican	1958	Incumbent re-elected.	▌ ✓ Elmer J. Hoffman (Republican) 63.8%; ▌Hayes Beall (Democratic) 36.2%
Illinois 15	Noah M. Mason	Republican	1936	Incumbent re-elected.	▌ ✓ Noah M. Mason (Republican) 50.5%; ▌Dorothy G. O'Brien (Democratic) 49.5%
Illinois 16	Leo E. Allen	Republican	1932	Incumbent retired. Republican hold.	▌ ✓ John B. Anderson (Republican) 62.3%; ▌Edwin M. Nelson (Democratic) 37.7%
Illinois 17	Leslie C. Arends	Republican	1934	Incumbent re-elected.	▌ ✓ Leslie C. Arends (Republican) 61.3%; ▌William T. Larkin (Democratic) 38.7%
Illinois 18	Robert H. Michel	Republican	1956	Incumbent re-elected.	▌ ✓ Robert H. Michel (Republican) 59.3%; ▌Richard A. Estep (Democratic) 40.7%
Illinois 19	Robert B. Chiperfield	Republican	1938	Incumbent re-elected.	▌ ✓ Robert B. Chiperfield (Republican) 50.6%; ▌John C. Watson (Democratic) 49.4%
Illinois 20	Edna O. Simpson	Republican	1958	Incumbent retired. Republican hold.	▌ ✓ Paul Findley (Republican) 55.6%; ▌Montgomery B. Carrott (Democratic) 44.4%
Illinois 21	Peter F. Mack Jr.	Democratic	1948	Incumbent re-elected.	▌ ✓ Peter F. Mack Jr. (Democratic) 54.7%; ▌J. Waldo Ackerman Jr. (Republican) 45.3%
Illinois 22	William L. Springer	Republican	1950	Incumbent re-elected.	▌ ✓ William L. Springer (Republican) 61.4%; ▌James T. Nally (Democratic) 38.6%
Illinois 23	George E. Shipley	Democratic	1958	Incumbent re-elected.	▌ ✓ George E. Shipley (Democratic) 51.6%; ▌Frank H. Walker (Republican) 48.4%
Illinois 24	Melvin Price	Democratic	1944	Incumbent re-elected.	▌ ✓ Melvin Price (Democratic) 72.2%; ▌Phyllis Schlafly (Republican) 27.8%
Illinois 25	Kenneth J. Gray	Democratic	1954	Incumbent re-elected.	▌ ✓ Kenneth J. Gray (Democratic) 57.9%; ▌Gordon E. Kerr (Republican) 42.1%

== Indiana ==
District	Incumbent			This race	
District	Member	Party	First elected	Results	Candidates
Indiana 1	Ray Madden	Democratic	1942	Incumbent re-elected.	▌ ✓ Ray Madden (Democratic) 64.7%; ▌Philip P. Parker (Republican) 35.1%; ▌Vernon N. Sherer (Prohibition) 0.2%
Indiana 2	Charles A. Halleck	Republican	1935 (special)	Incumbent re-elected.	▌ ✓ Charles A. Halleck (Republican) 57.5%; ▌George H. Bowers (Democratic) 42.2%; ▌Earl Dodge (Prohibition) 0.3%
Indiana 3	John Brademas	Democratic	1958	Incumbent re-elected.	▌ ✓ John Brademas (Democratic) 52.4%; ▌F. Jay Nimtz (Republican) 47.6%
Indiana 4	E. Ross Adair	Republican	1950	Incumbent re-elected.	▌ ✓ E. Ross Adair (Republican) 58.2%; ▌Byron McCammon (Democratic) 41.8%
Indiana 5	J. Edward Roush	Democratic	1958	Incumbent re-elected.	▌ ✓ J. Edward Roush (Democratic) 50.0%; ▌George O. Chambers (Republican) 50.0%
Indiana 6	Fred Wampler	Democratic	1958	Incumbent lost re-election. Republican gain.	▌ ✓ Richard L. Roudebush (Republican) 52.0%; ▌Fred Wampler (Democratic) 48.0%
Indiana 7	William G. Bray	Republican	1950	Incumbent re-elected.	▌ ✓ William G. Bray (Republican) 60.1%; ▌Thomas C. Cravens (Democratic) 39.9%
Indiana 8	Winfield K. Denton	Democratic	1954	Incumbent re-elected.	▌ ✓ Winfield K. Denton (Democratic) 53.2%; ▌Alvan V. Burch (Republican) 46.6%; ▌J. C. Kelly (Prohibition) 0.2%
Indiana 9	Earl Hogan	Democratic	1958	Incumbent lost re-election. Republican gain.	▌ ✓ Earl Wilson (Republican) 50.6%; ▌Earl Hogan (Democratic) 49.4%
Indiana 10	Randall S. Harmon	Democratic	1958	Incumbent lost re-election. Republican gain.	▌ ✓ Ralph Harvey (Republican) 57.1%; ▌Randall S. Harmon (Democratic) 42.9%
Indiana 11	Joseph W. Barr	Democratic	1958	Incumbent lost re-election. Republican gain.	▌ ✓ Donald C. Bruce (Republican) 53.7%; ▌Joseph W. Barr (Democratic) 46.2%; ▌Frank N. Williams (Prohibition) 0.1%

== Iowa ==
District	Incumbent			This race	
District	Member	Party	First elected	Results	Candidates
Iowa 1	Fred Schwengel	Republican	1954	Incumbent re-elected.	▌ ✓ Fred Schwengel (Republican) 60.9%; ▌Walter J. Guenther (Democratic) 39.1%
Iowa 2	Leonard G. Wolf	Democratic	1958	Incumbent lost re-election. Republican gain.	▌ ✓ James E. Bromwell (Republican) 52.6%; ▌Leonard G. Wolf (Democratic) 47.4%
Iowa 3	H. R. Gross	Republican	1948	Incumbent re-elected.	▌ ✓ H. R. Gross (Republican) 56.3%; ▌Michael Micich (Democratic) 43.7%
Iowa 4	John Henry Kyl	Republican	1959 (special)	Incumbent re-elected.	▌ ✓ John Henry Kyl (Republican) 56.6%; ▌C. Edwin Gilmour (Democratic) 43.4%
Iowa 5	Neal Smith	Democratic	1958	Incumbent re-elected.	▌ ✓ Neal Smith (Democratic) 53.0%; ▌Floyd M. Burgeson (Republican) 47.0%
Iowa 6	Merwin Coad	Democratic	1956	Incumbent re-elected.	▌ ✓ Merwin Coad (Democratic) 53.6%; ▌Curtis G. Riehm (Republican) 46.4%
Iowa 7	Ben F. Jensen	Republican	1938	Incumbent re-elected.	▌ ✓ Ben F. Jensen (Republican) 55.8%; ▌Duane Orton (Democratic) 44.2%
Iowa 8	Charles B. Hoeven	Republican	1942	Incumbent re-elected.	▌ ✓ Charles B. Hoeven (Republican) 57.5%; ▌Donald E. O'Brien (Democratic) 42.5%

== Kansas ==
District	Incumbent			This race	
District	Member	Party	First elected	Results	Candidates
Kansas 1	William H. Avery	Republican	1954	Incumbent re-elected.	▌ ✓ William H. Avery (Republican) 63.1%; ▌Marshall G. Gardiner (Democratic) 36.9%
Kansas 2	Newell A. George	Democratic	1958	Incumbent lost re-election. Republican gain.	▌ ✓ Robert Ellsworth (Republican) 52.3%; ▌Newell A. George (Democratic) 47.7%
Kansas 3	Denver D. Hargis	Democratic	1958	Incumbent lost re-election. Republican gain.	▌ ✓ Walter L. McVey Jr. (Republican) 51.2%; ▌Denver D. Hargis (Democratic) 48.8%
Kansas 4	Edward Herbert Rees	Republican	1936	Incumbent retired. Republican hold.	▌ ✓ Garner E. Shriver (Republican) 55.2%; ▌William I. Robinson (Democratic) 44.8%
Kansas 5	J. Floyd Breeding	Democratic	1956	Incumbent re-elected.	▌ ✓ J. Floyd Breeding (Democratic) 55.5%; ▌Joe W. Hunter (Republican) 44.5%
Kansas 6	Wint Smith	Republican	1946	Incumbent retired. Republican hold.	▌ ✓ Bob Dole (Republican) 59.3%; ▌William A. Davis (Democratic) 40.7%

== Kentucky ==
District	Incumbent			This race	
District	Member	Party	First elected	Results	Candidates
Kentucky 1	Frank Stubblefield	Democratic	1958	Incumbent re-elected.	▌ ✓ Frank Stubblefield (Democratic); Uncontested
Kentucky 2	William Natcher	Democratic	1953 (special)	Incumbent re-elected.	▌ ✓ William Natcher (Democratic); Uncontested
Kentucky 3	Frank W. Burke	Democratic	1958	Incumbent re-elected.	▌ ✓ Frank W. Burke (Democratic) 50.3%; ▌Henry R. Heyburn (Republican) 49.7%
Kentucky 4	Frank Chelf	Democratic	1944	Incumbent re-elected.	▌ ✓ Frank Chelf (Democratic); Uncontested
Kentucky 5	Brent Spence	Democratic	1930	Incumbent re-elected.	▌ ✓ Brent Spence (Democratic) 55.4%; ▌Jule Appel (Republican) 44.6%
Kentucky 6	John C. Watts	Democratic	1951 (special)	Incumbent re-elected.	▌ ✓ John C. Watts (Democratic) 54.7%; ▌Howard A. Dickey (Republican) 45.3%
Kentucky 7	Carl D. Perkins	Democratic	1948	Incumbent re-elected.	▌ ✓ Carl D. Perkins (Democratic) 56.1%; ▌Herbert Rowland (Republican) 43.9%
Kentucky 8	Eugene Siler	Republican	1954	Incumbent re-elected.	▌ ✓ Eugene Siler (Republican) 71.8%; ▌Donald R. Shepherd (Democratic) 28.2%

== Louisiana ==
District	Incumbent			This race	
District	Member	Party	First elected	Results	Candidates
Louisiana 1	F. Edward Hébert	Democratic	1940	Incumbent re-elected.	▌ ✓ F. Edward Hébert (Democratic) 82.1%; ▌Norman W. Prendergast (Republican) 17.9%
Louisiana 2	Hale Boggs	Democratic	1940; 1942 (lost); 1946	Incumbent re-elected.	▌ ✓ Hale Boggs (Democratic) 78.0%; ▌E. Ross Buckley (Republican) 22.0%
Louisiana 3	Edwin E. Willis	Democratic	1948	Incumbent re-elected.	▌ ✓ Edwin E. Willis (Democratic) 83.6%; ▌Floyd J. Duplantis (Republican) 16.4%
Louisiana 4	Overton Brooks	Democratic	1936	Incumbent re-elected.	▌ ✓ Overton Brooks (Democratic) 74.9%; ▌Fred C. McClanahan Jr. (Republican) 25.1%
Louisiana 5	Otto Passman	Democratic	1946	Incumbent re-elected.	▌ ✓ Otto Passman (Democratic); Uncontested
Louisiana 6	James H. Morrison	Democratic	1942	Incumbent re-elected.	▌ ✓ James H. Morrison (Democratic) 85.6%; ▌Charles H. Dillemuth (Republican) 14.4%
Louisiana 7	T. Ashton Thompson	Democratic	1952	Incumbent re-elected.	▌ ✓ T. Ashton Thompson (Democratic); Uncontested
Louisiana 8	Harold B. McSween	Democratic	1958	Incumbent lost renomination, then replaced Earl Long on the ballot after he died. Incumbent re-elected.	▌ ✓ Harold B. McSween (Democratic); Uncontested

== Maine ==
District	Incumbent			This race	
District	Member	Party	First elected	Results	Candidates
Maine 1	James C. Oliver	Democratic	1936 (Note: Oliver was originally elected in 1936 as a Republican. After losing the Republican primary in 1942, he was elected back to the seat in 1958 as a Democrat.); 1942 (lost renomination); 1958	Incumbent lost re-election. Republican gain.	▌ ✓ Peter A. Garland (Republican) 53.8%; ▌James C. Oliver (Democratic) 46.2%
Maine 2	Frank M. Coffin	Democratic	1956	Retired to run for Governor; Republican gain.	▌ ✓ Stanley R. Tupper (Republican) 53.4%; ▌John C. Donovan (Democratic) 46.6%
Maine 3	Clifford McIntire	Republican	1951	Incumbent re-elected.	▌ ✓ Clifford McIntire (Republican) 64.1%; ▌David G. Roberts (Democratic) 35.9%

== Maryland ==
District	Incumbent			This race	
District	Member	Party	First elected	Results	Candidates
Maryland 1	Thomas Johnson	Democratic	1958	Incumbent re-elected.	▌ ✓ Thomas Johnson (Democratic) 53.6%; ▌Edward T. Miller (Republican) 46.4%
Maryland 2	Daniel Brewster	Democratic	1958	Incumbent re-elected.	▌ ✓ Daniel Brewster (Democratic) 58.6%; ▌J. Fife Symington Jr. (Republican) 41.4%
Maryland 3	Edward Garmatz	Democratic	1947	Incumbent re-elected.	▌ ✓ Edward Garmatz (Democratic) 80.3%; ▌Robert J. Gerstung (Republican) 19.7%
Maryland 4	George Hyde Fallon	Democratic	1944	Incumbent re-elected.	▌ ✓ George Hyde Fallon (Democratic) 65.5%; ▌Melvin R. Kenney (Republican) 34.5%
Maryland 5	Richard Lankford	Democratic	1954	Incumbent re-elected.	▌ ✓ Richard Lankford (Democratic) 62.2%; ▌Carlyle J. Lancaster (Republican) 37.8%
Maryland 6	John R. Foley	Democratic	1958	Incumbent lost re-election. Republican gain.	▌ ✓ Charles Mathias (Republican) 52.0%; ▌John R. Foley (Democratic) 48.0%
Maryland 7	Samuel Friedel	Democratic	1952	Incumbent re-elected.	▌ ✓ Samuel Friedel (Democratic) 64.5%; ▌David M. Blum (Republican) 35.5%

== Massachusetts ==
District	Incumbent			This race	
District	Member	Party	First elected	Results	Candidates
Massachusetts 1	Silvio O. Conte	Republican	1958	Incumbent re-elected.	▌ ✓ Silvio O. Conte (Republican) 68.5%; ▌William H. Burns (Democratic) 31.2%; ▌Arthur J. Green (Prohibition) 0.3%
Massachusetts 2	Edward Boland	Democratic	1952	Incumbent re-elected.	▌ ✓ Edward Boland (Democratic); Uncontested
Massachusetts 3	Philip J. Philbin	Democratic	1942	Incumbent re-elected.	▌ ✓ Philip J. Philbin (Democratic); Uncontested
Massachusetts 4	Harold Donohue	Democratic	1946	Incumbent re-elected.	▌ ✓ Harold Donohue (Democratic) 64.5%; ▌Robert N. Scola (Republican) 35.5%
Massachusetts 5	Edith Nourse Rogers	Republican	1925	Incumbent died September 10, 1960. Republican hold.	▌ ✓ F. Bradford Morse (Republican) 54.5%; ▌William C. Madden (Democratic) 45.5%
Massachusetts 6	William H. Bates	Republican	1950	Incumbent re-elected.	▌ ✓ William H. Bates (Republican) 65.9%; ▌Mary Kennedy (Democratic) 34.1%
Massachusetts 7	Thomas J. Lane	Democratic	1941	Incumbent re-elected.	▌ ✓ Thomas J. Lane (Democratic); Uncontested
Massachusetts 8	Torbert Macdonald	Democratic	1954	Incumbent re-elected.	▌ ✓ Torbert Macdonald (Democratic) 65.9%; ▌Ward Collins Cramer (Republican) 34.1%
Massachusetts 9	Hastings Keith	Republican	1958	Incumbent re-elected.	▌ ✓ Hastings Keith (Republican) 55.7%; ▌Edward F. Harrington (Democratic) 44.3%
Massachusetts 10	Laurence Curtis	Republican	1952	Incumbent re-elected.	▌ ✓ Laurence Curtis (Republican) 58.2%; ▌Joseph J. Mulhern Jr. (Democratic) 41.8%
Massachusetts 11	Tip O'Neill	Democratic	1952	Incumbent re-elected.	▌ ✓ Tip O'Neill (Democratic); Uncontested
Massachusetts 12	John W. McCormack	Democratic	1928	Incumbent re-elected.	▌ ✓ John W. McCormack (Democratic); Uncontested
Massachusetts 13	James A. Burke	Democratic	1958	Incumbent re-elected.	▌ ✓ James A. Burke (Democratic) 58.5%; ▌Charles J. Gabriel (Republican) 41.5%
Massachusetts 14	Joseph W. Martin Jr.	Republican	1924	Incumbent re-elected.	▌ ✓ Joseph W. Martin Jr. (Republican) 60.3%; ▌Edward F. Doolan (Democratic) 39.7%

== Michigan ==
District	Incumbent			This race	
District	Member	Party	First elected	Results	Candidates
Michigan 1	Thaddeus M. Machrowicz	Democratic	1950	Incumbent re-elected.	▌ ✓ Thaddeus M. Machrowicz (Democratic) 88.4%; ▌Walter Czarnecki (Republican) 11.3%; Others: ▌Peter Stayanoff (Socialist Labor) 0.1%; ▌Adam Kempa (Ind Amer) 0.09%; ▌Carroll Ambler (Prohibition) 0.05%
Michigan 2	George Meader	Republican	1950	Incumbent re-elected.	▌ ✓ George Meader (Republican) 59.6%; ▌Thomas P. Payne (Democratic) 40.2%; Others: ▌Verdon R. Dunckel (Prohibition) 0.09%; ▌Edmund T. Taylor (Socialist Labor) 0.04%; ▌Ray W. Graham (Ind Amer) 0.04%
Michigan 3	August E. Johansen	Republican	1954	Incumbent re-elected.	▌ ✓ August E. Johansen (Republican) 60.5%; ▌Samuel I. Clark (Democratic) 39.2%; ▌Floyd R. Latta (Prohibition) 0.2%
Michigan 4	Clare E. Hoffman	Republican	1934	Incumbent re-elected.	▌ ✓ Clare E. Hoffman (Republican) 62.3%; ▌Edward Burns (Democratic) 37.5%; ▌Jerry Johncock (Prohibition) 0.2%
Michigan 5	Gerald Ford	Republican	1948	Incumbent re-elected.	▌ ✓ Gerald Ford (Republican) 66.8%; ▌William G. Reamon (Democratic) 33.1%; Others: ▌LeRoy A. Robert (Prohibition) 0.06%; ▌Donald Teets (Socialist Labor) 0.03%
Michigan 6	Charles E. Chamberlain	Republican	1956	Incumbent re-elected.	▌ ✓ Charles E. Chamberlain (Republican) 56.6%; ▌Jerome F. O'Rourke (Democratic) 43.3%; ▌Paul H. Kyburz (Prohibition) 0.09%
Michigan 7	James G. O'Hara	Democratic	1958	Incumbent re-elected.	▌ ✓ James G. O'Hara (Democratic) 53.3%; ▌Robert J. McIntosh (Republican) 46.6%; Others: ▌Clarence E. Smith (Prohibition) 0.05%; ▌Mary Mills (Socialist Labor) 0.05%; ▌Raymond E. Watrous (Ind Amer) 0.03%
Michigan 8	Alvin Morell Bentley	Republican	1952	Incumbent retired to run for U.S. senator. Republican hold.	▌ ✓ R. James Harvey (Republican) 62.2%; ▌Mary M. Harden (Democratic) 37.6%; ▌Herald F. DeWeese (Prohibition) 0.1%
Michigan 9	Robert P. Griffin	Republican	1956	Incumbent re-elected.	▌ ✓ Robert P. Griffin (Republican) 59.6%; ▌Donald G. Jennings (Democratic) 40.3%; ▌Carl E. Ruble (Prohibition) 0.07%
Michigan 10	Al Cederberg	Republican	1952	Incumbent re-elected.	▌ ✓ Al Cederberg (Republican) 62.1%; ▌Daniel E. Reed (Democratic) 37.8%; ▌Mildred Montgomery (Prohibition) 0.09%
Michigan 11	Victor A. Knox	Republican	1952	Incumbent re-elected.	▌ ✓ Victor A. Knox (Republican) 54.8%; ▌Prentiss M. Brown Jr. (Democratic) 45.1%; ▌Elving Thorpe (Prohibition) 0.05%
Michigan 12	John B. Bennett	Republican	1946	Incumbent re-elected.	▌ ✓ John B. Bennett (Republican) 60.8%; ▌Robert C. McCarthy (Democratic) 39.1%; ▌Halmer Dahlgren (Prohibition) 0.05%
Michigan 13	Charles Diggs	Democratic	1954	Incumbent re-elected.	▌ ✓ Charles Diggs (Democratic) 71.4%; ▌Robert B. Blackwell (Republican) 28.2%; Others: ▌Cleve C. Hull (Ind Amer) 0.1%; ▌Peter Goonis (Socialist Labor) 0.1%; ▌John T. Wiandt (Tax Cut) 0.09%; ▌Vernon Good (Prohibition) 0.07%
Michigan 14	Louis C. Rabaut	Democratic	1948	Incumbent re-elected.	▌ ✓ Louis C. Rabaut (Democratic) 62.7%; ▌Lois V. Nair (Republican) 37.1%; Others: ▌C. B. Smith (Tax Cut) 0.09%; ▌William Sablich (Socialist Labor) 0.07%; ▌Eugene Hopusch (Prohibition) 0.03%
Michigan 15	John Dingell	Democratic	1955 (special)	Incumbent re-elected.	▌ ✓ John Dingell (Democratic) 79.4%; ▌Robert J. Robbins (Republican) 20.3%; Others: ▌Hiram J. Coffman (Prohibition) 0.1%; ▌Joseph F. Koss (Socialist Labor) 0.08%; ▌Curt Engstrom (Ind Amer) 0.06%
Michigan 16	John Lesinski Jr.	Democratic	1932	Incumbent re-elected.	▌ ✓ John Lesinski Jr. (Democratic) 66.0%; ▌Lee H. Clark (Republican) 33.8%; Others: ▌James C. Horvath (Socialist Labor) 0.09%; ▌Paul D. Gariepy (Ind Amer) 0.05%; ▌Lucy Larkin (Prohibition) 0.04%
Michigan 17	Martha Griffiths	Democratic	1954	Incumbent re-elected.	▌ ✓ Martha Griffiths (Democratic) 57.6%; ▌Richard E. Morell (Republican) 42.2%; Others: ▌William Walbridge (Socialist Labor) 0.07%; ▌J. Byron Stover (Ind Amer) 0.05%; ▌Sadie Grass (Tax Cut) 0.03%; ▌Richard Zeller (Prohibition) 0.03%
Michigan 18	William Broomfield	Republican	1956	Incumbent re-elected.	▌ ✓ William Broomfield (Republican) 55.8%; ▌James Kellis (Democratic) 44.0%; Others: ▌Fred Mayers (Socialist Labor) 0.06%; ▌Hugh J. Thomas (Ind Amer) 0.04%; ▌Phyllis G. Kile (Prohibition) 0.03%

== Minnesota ==
District	Incumbent			This race	
District	Member	Party	First elected	Results	Candidates
Minnesota 1	Al Quie	Republican	1958	Incumbent re-elected.	▌ ✓ Al Quie (Republican) 60.5%; ▌George Shepherd (DFL) 39.5%
Minnesota 2	Ancher Nelsen	Republican	1958	Incumbent re-elected.	▌ ✓ Ancher Nelsen (Republican) 57.2%; ▌Russel Schwandt (DFL) 42.8%
Minnesota 3	Roy Wier	Democratic (DFL)	1948	Incumbent lost re-election. Republican gain.	▌ ✓ Clark MacGregor (Republican) 52.5%; ▌Roy Wier (DFL) 47.5%
Minnesota 4	Joseph Karth	Democratic (DFL)	1958	Incumbent re-elected.	▌ ✓ Joseph Karth (DFL) 61.0%; ▌Joseph J. Mitchell (Republican) 39.0%
Minnesota 5	Walter Judd	Republican	1942	Incumbent re-elected.	▌ ✓ Walter Judd (Republican) 60.9%; ▌George J. Matthews (DFL) 39.1%
Minnesota 6	Fred Marshall	Democratic (DFL)	1948	Incumbent re-elected.	▌ ✓ Fred Marshall (DFL) 59.6%; ▌Frank L. King (Republican) 40.4%
Minnesota 7	H. Carl Andersen	Republican	1938	Incumbent re-elected.	▌ ✓ H. Carl Andersen (Republican) 52.5%; ▌Gordon E. Duenow (DFL) 47.5%
Minnesota 8	John Blatnik	Democratic (DFL)	1946	Incumbent re-elected.	▌ ✓ John Blatnik (DFL) 69.5%; ▌Jerry H. Ketola (Republican) 30.5%
Minnesota 9	Odin Langen	Republican	1958	Incumbent re-elected.	▌ ✓ Odin Langen (Republican) 52.2%; ▌Coya Knutson (DFL) 47.8%

== Mississippi ==
District	Incumbent			This race	
District	Member	Party	First elected	Results	Candidates
Mississippi 1	Thomas Abernethy	Democratic	1942	Incumbent re-elected.	▌ ✓ Thomas Abernethy (Democratic) 93.6%; ▌Edward W. Scott (Republican) 6.4%
Mississippi 2	Jamie Whitten	Democratic	1941	Incumbent re-elected.	▌ ✓ Jamie Whitten (Democratic); Uncontested
Mississippi 3	Frank Ellis Smith	Democratic	1950	Incumbent re-elected.	▌ ✓ Frank Ellis Smith (Democratic) 92.7%; ▌W. A. Clark (Republican) 7.3%
Mississippi 4	John Bell Williams	Democratic	1946	Incumbent re-elected.	▌ ✓ John Bell Williams (Democratic); Uncontested
Mississippi 5	W. Arthur Winstead	Democratic	1942	Incumbent re-elected.	▌ ✓ W. Arthur Winstead (Democratic); Uncontested
Mississippi 6	William M. Colmer	Democratic	1932	Incumbent re-elected.	▌ ✓ William M. Colmer (Democratic); Uncontested

== Missouri ==
District	Incumbent			This race	
District	Member	Party	First elected	Results	Candidates
Missouri 1	Frank M. Karsten	Democratic	1946	Incumbent re-elected.	▌ ✓ Frank M. Karsten (Democratic) 70.8%; ▌Sam J. Kallaos (Republican) 29.2%
Missouri 2	Thomas B. Curtis	Republican	1950	Incumbent re-elected.	▌ ✓ Thomas B. Curtis (Republican) 56.7%; ▌Richard L. Carp (Democratic) 43.3%
Missouri 3	Leonor Sullivan	Democratic	1952	Incumbent re-elected.	▌ ✓ Leonor Sullivan (Democratic) 73.3%; ▌Morton L. Schwartz (Republican) 26.7%
Missouri 4	William J. Randall	Democratic	1959	Incumbent re-elected.	▌ ✓ William J. Randall (Democratic) 54.0%; ▌Kenneth K. Lowe (Republican) 46.0%
Missouri 5	Richard W. Bolling	Democratic	1948	Incumbent re-elected.	▌ ✓ Richard W. Bolling (Democratic) 61.0%; ▌Clinton H. Gates (Republican) 39.0%
Missouri 6	William R. Hull Jr.	Democratic	1954	Incumbent re-elected.	▌ ✓ William R. Hull Jr. (Democratic) 54.6%; ▌Ethan H. Campbell (Republican) 45.4%
Missouri 7	Charles H. Brown	Democratic	1956	Incumbent lost re-election. Republican gain.	▌ ✓ Durward Gorham Hall (Republican) 54.9%; ▌Charles H. Brown (Democratic) 45.1%
Missouri 8	A. S. J. Carnahan	Democratic	1948	Incumbent lost renomination. Democratic hold.	▌ ✓ Richard Ichord (Democratic) 58.0%; ▌Curtis J. Tindel (Republican) 42.0%
Missouri 9	Clarence Cannon	Democratic	1922	Incumbent re-elected.	▌ ✓ Clarence Cannon (Democratic) 59.8%; ▌Anthony C. Schroeder (Republican) 40.2%
Missouri 10	Paul C. Jones	Democratic	1948	Incumbent re-elected.	▌ ✓ Paul C. Jones (Democratic); Uncontested
Missouri 11	Morgan M. Moulder	Democratic	1948	Incumbent re-elected.	▌ ✓ Morgan M. Moulder (Democratic) 50.1%; ▌Robert A. Bartel (Republican) 49.9%

== Montana ==
District	Incumbent			This race	
District	Member	Party	First elected	Results	Candidates
Montana 1	Lee Metcalf	Democratic	1952	Retired to run for U.S. senator. Democratic hold.	▌ ✓ Arnold Olsen (Democratic) 53.3%; ▌George P. Sarsfield (Republican) 46.7%
Montana 2	LeRoy H. Anderson	Democratic	1956	Retired to run for U.S. senator. Republican gain.	▌ ✓ James F. Battin (Republican) 50.9%; ▌Leo Graybill Jr. (Democratic) 49.1%

== Nebraska ==
District	Incumbent			This race	
District	Member	Party	First elected	Results	Candidates
Nebraska 1	Phil Weaver	Republican	1954	Incumbent re-elected.	▌ ✓ Phil Weaver (Republican) 55.5%; ▌Gerald Whelan (Democratic) 44.5%
Nebraska 2	Glenn Cunningham	Republican	1956	Incumbent re-elected.	▌ ✓ Glenn Cunningham (Republican) 66.6%; ▌Joseph Benesch (Democratic) 33.4%
Nebraska 3	Lawrence Brock	Democratic	1958	Incumbent lost re-election. Republican gain.	▌ ✓ Ralph F. Beermann (Republican) 51.3%; ▌Lawrence Brock (Democratic) 48.7%
Nebraska 4	Donald McGinley	Democratic	1958	Incumbent lost re-election. Republican gain.	▌ ✓ David Martin (Republican) 51.1%; ▌Donald McGinley (Democratic) 48.9%

== Nevada ==
District	Incumbent			This race	
District	Member	Party	First elected	Results	Candidates
Nevada at-large	Walter S. Baring Jr.	Democratic	1948; 1952 (lost); 1956	Incumbent re-elected.	▌ ✓ Walter S. Baring Jr. (Democratic) 57.5%; ▌ George W. Malone (Republican) 42.5%

== New Hampshire ==
District	Incumbent			This race	
District	Member	Party	First elected	Results	Candidates
New Hampshire 1	Chester E. Merrow	Republican	1942	Incumbent re-elected.	▌ ✓ Chester E. Merrow (Republican) 56.5%; ▌Romeo J. Champagne (Democratic) 43.5%
New Hampshire 2	Perkins Bass	Republican	1954	Incumbent re-elected.	▌ ✓ Perkins Bass (Republican) 60.3%; ▌Stuart V. Nims (Democratic) 39.7%

== New Jersey ==
District	Incumbent			This race	
District	Member	Party	First elected	Results	Candidates
New Jersey 1	William T. Cahill	Republican	1958	Incumbent re-elected.	▌ ✓ William T. Cahill (Republican) 57.6%; ▌John A. Healey (Democratic) 42.2%; ▌Jules Levin (Socialist Labor) 0.2%
New Jersey 2	Milton W. Glenn	Republican	1957	Incumbent re-elected.	▌ ✓ Milton W. Glenn (Republican) 56.5%; ▌John A. Miller (Democratic) 43.2%; ▌Morris Karp (Socialist Labor) 0.2%
New Jersey 3	James C. Auchincloss	Republican	1942	Incumbent re-elected.	▌ ✓ James C. Auchincloss (Republican) 53.1%; ▌Katharine E. White (Democratic) 46.9%
New Jersey 4	Frank Thompson	Democratic	1954	Incumbent re-elected.	▌ ✓ Frank Thompson (Democratic) 60.2%; ▌A. Jerome Moore (Republican) 39.6%; Others: ▌Howard G. Frank (Conservative) 0.1%; ▌Bernardo S. Doganiero (Socialist Labor) 0.1%
New Jersey 5	Peter Frelinghuysen Jr.	Republican	1952	Incumbent re-elected.	▌ ✓ Peter Frelinghuysen Jr. (Republican) 58.6%; ▌Jerome H. Taub (Democratic) 41.3%; ▌Delmar Calwhite (Socialist Labor) 0.2%
New Jersey 6	Florence P. Dwyer	Republican	1956	Incumbent re-elected.	▌ ✓ Florence P. Dwyer (Republican) 57.7%; ▌Jack B. Dunn (Democratic) 41.4%; Others: ▌John H. Wisner Jr. (Conservative) 0.7%; ▌Alexander Kudlik (Socialist Labor) 0.1%
New Jersey 7	William B. Widnall	Republican	1950	Incumbent re-elected.	▌ ✓ William B. Widnall (Republican) 63.7%; ▌James Dobbins (Democratic) 36.0%; ▌Robert A. Kretzer (Conservative) 0.3%
New Jersey 8	Gordon Canfield	Republican	1940	Incumbent retired. Democratic gain.	▌ ✓ Charles S. Joelson (Democratic) 52.0%; ▌Walter P. Kennedy (Republican) 43.8%; ▌Ronald G. Timm (Conservative) 4.0%; ▌Harry Santhouse (Socialist Labor) 0.2%
New Jersey 9	Frank C. Osmers Jr.	Republican	1951	Incumbent re-elected.	▌ ✓ Frank C. Osmers Jr. (Republican) 58.1%; ▌Vincent T. McKenna (Democratic) 41.6%; ▌Arthur A. Wacker (Conservative) 0.3%
New Jersey 10	Peter W. Rodino	Democratic	1948	Incumbent re-elected.	▌ ✓ Peter W. Rodino (Democratic) 65.3%; ▌Alphonse A. Miele (Republican) 33.3%; ▌Frank J. DeGeorge (Conservative) 1.5%
New Jersey 11	Hugh J. Addonizio	Democratic	1948	Incumbent re-elected.	▌ ✓ Hugh J. Addonizio (Democratic) 61.4%; ▌Frank A. Palmieri (Republican) 36.2%; ▌Josephine Underwood (Conservative) 2.1%; ▌Julian E. Whitney (Independent) 0.2%
New Jersey 12	George M. Wallhauser	Republican	1958	Incumbent re-elected.	▌ ✓ George M. Wallhauser (Republican) 50.2%; ▌Robert R. Peacock (Democratic) 47.7%; ▌Tony Marsella (Socialist Labor) 1.6%; ▌Harold Poeschel (Conservative) 0.5%
New Jersey 13	Cornelius Gallagher	Democratic	1958	Incumbent re-elected.	▌ ✓ Cornelius Gallagher (Democratic) 68.3%; ▌Samuel F. Kanis (Republican) 31.7%
New Jersey 14	Dominick V. Daniels	Democratic	1958	Incumbent re-elected.	▌ ✓ Dominick V. Daniels (Democratic) 57.3%; ▌Frank A. Musto (Republican) 41.7%; ▌Patrick J. Loori (Independent) 1.0%

== New Mexico ==
District	Incumbent			This race	
District	Member	Party	First elected	Results	Candidates
New Mexico at-large	Joseph Montoya	Democratic	1957	Incumbent re-elected.	▌ ✓ Joseph Montoya (Democratic) 29.5%; ▌ ✓ Thomas G. Morris (Democratic) 28.8%; ▌John D. Robb (Republican) 20.7%; ▌Edward V. Balcomb (Republican) 20.7%; ▌Helen Galloway (Prohibition) 0.1%; ▌L. F. Ingram (Prohibition) 0.1%
New Mexico at-large	Thomas G. Morris	Democratic	1958	Incumbent re-elected.	▌ ✓ Joseph Montoya (Democratic) 29.5%; ▌ ✓ Thomas G. Morris (Democratic) 28.8%; ▌John D. Robb (Republican) 20.7%; ▌Edward V. Balcomb (Republican) 20.7%; ▌Helen Galloway (Prohibition) 0.1%; ▌L. F. Ingram (Prohibition) 0.1%

== New York ==
District	Incumbent			This race	
District	Member	Party	First elected	Results	Candidates
New York 1	Stuyvesant Wainwright	Republican	1952	Incumbent lost re-election. Democratic gain.	▌ ✓ Otis G. Pike (Democratic) 50.4%; ▌Stuyvesant Wainwright (Republican) 49.6%
New York 2	Steven Derounian	Republican	1952	Incumbent re-elected.	▌ ✓ Steven Derounian (Republican) 61.0%; ▌John J. Drury (Democratic) 39.0%
New York 3	Frank J. Becker	Republican	1952	Incumbent re-elected.	▌ ✓ Frank J. Becker (Republican) 54.1%; ▌Julius J. Rosen (Democratic) 45.9%
New York 4	Seymour Halpern	Republican	1958	Incumbent re-elected.	▌ ✓ Seymour Halpern (Republican) 55.1%; ▌Bernard A. Helfat (Democratic) 44.9%
New York 5	Albert H. Bosch	Republican	1952	Retired to run for judge of Queens County court. Democratic gain.	▌ ✓ Joseph P. Addabbo (Democratic) 54.2%; ▌George Archinal (Republican) 45.8%
New York 6	Lester Holtzman	Democratic	1952	Incumbent re-elected.	▌ ✓ Lester Holtzman (Democratic) 65.6%; ▌Vincent L. Pitaro (Republican) 34.4%
New York 7	James J. Delaney	Democratic	1944; 1946 (lost); 1948	Incumbent re-elected.	▌ ✓ James J. Delaney (Democratic) 60.7%; ▌Edward V. Lisoski (Republican) 39.3%
New York 8	Victor Anfuso	Democratic	1954	Incumbent re-elected.	▌ ✓ Victor Anfuso (Democratic) 72.9%; ▌Leon F. Nadrowski (Republican) 27.1%
New York 9	Eugene Keogh	Democratic	1936	Incumbent re-elected.	▌ ✓ Eugene Keogh (Democratic) 72.3%; ▌Herman Sanders (Republican) 27.7%
New York 10	Edna F. Kelly	Democratic	1949	Incumbent re-elected.	▌ ✓ Edna F. Kelly (Democratic) 76.6%; ▌Jerome P. Schneider (Republican) 23.4%
New York 11	Emanuel Celler	Democratic	1922	Incumbent re-elected.	▌ ✓ Emanuel Celler (Democratic) 81.6%; ▌Seymour Besunder (Republican) 18.4%
New York 12	Francis E. Dorn	Republican	1952	Incumbent lost re-election. Democratic gain.	▌ ✓ Hugh Carey (Democratic) 50.4%; ▌Francis E. Dorn (Republican) 49.6%
New York 13	Abraham J. Multer	Democratic	1947	Incumbent re-elected.	▌ ✓ Abraham J. Multer (Democratic) 75.4%; ▌Joseph A. DeMarco (Republican) 24.6%
New York 14	John J. Rooney	Democratic	1944	Incumbent re-elected.	▌ ✓ John J. Rooney (Democratic) 70.6%; ▌Carlo G. Colavito (Republican) 29.4%
New York 15	John H. Ray	Republican	1952	Incumbent re-elected.	▌ ✓ John H. Ray (Republican) 48.7%; ▌John M. Murphy (Democratic) 47.2%; ▌Timothy W. Costello (Liberal) 4.1%
New York 16	Adam Clayton Powell Jr.	Democratic	1944	Incumbent re-elected.	▌ ✓ Adam Clayton Powell Jr. (Democratic) 71.6%; ▌Joseph A. Bailey (Republican) 17.6%; ▌Arthur O. Boyer (Liberal) 10.9%
New York 17	John Lindsay	Republican	1958	Incumbent re-elected.	▌ ✓ John Lindsay (Republican) 60.2%; ▌William vanden Heuvel (Democratic) 39.8%
New York 18	Alfred E. Santangelo	Democratic	1956	Incumbent re-elected.	▌ ✓ Alfred E. Santangelo (Democratic) 58.3%; ▌Charles Muzzicato (Republican) 33.5%; ▌Faustino Louis Garcia (Liberal) 8.2%
New York 19	Leonard Farbstein	Democratic	1956	Incumbent re-elected.	▌ ✓ Leonard Farbstein (Democratic) 72.4%; ▌Thomas P. O'Callaghan (Republican) 27.6%
New York 20	Ludwig Teller	Democratic	1956	Incumbent lost renomination; defeated as a Liberal. Democratic hold.	▌ ✓ William Fitts Ryan (Democratic) 55.7%; ▌Morris Aarons (Republican) 30.3%; ▌Ludwig Teller (Liberal) 14.0%
New York 21	Herbert Zelenko	Democratic	1954	Incumbent re-elected.	▌ ✓ Herbert Zelenko (Democratic) 74.6%; ▌Thomas H. Bartzos (Republican) 25.4%
New York 22	James C. Healey	Democratic	1956	Incumbent re-elected.	▌ ✓ James C. Healey (Democratic) 65.0%; ▌Dominick A. Fusco (Republican) 20.6%; ▌David I. Wells (Liberal) 14.4%
New York 23	Jacob H. Gilbert	Democratic	1960 (special)	Incumbent re-elected.	▌ ✓ Jacob H. Gilbert (Democratic) 70.6%; ▌Benjamin Thornley (Republican) 17.5%; ▌Nicholas B. Gyory (Liberal) 12.0%
New York 24	Charles A. Buckley	Democratic	1934	Incumbent re-elected.	▌ ✓ Charles A. Buckley (Democratic) 56.6%; ▌Michael R. Cappelli (Republican) 27.4%; ▌Murray Koenig (Liberal) 16.0%
New York 25	Paul A. Fino	Republican	1952	Incumbent re-elected.	▌ ✓ Paul A. Fino (Republican) 59.8%; ▌Eugene L. Sugarman (Democratic) 35.5%; ▌Bernard Tobacman (Liberal) 4.7%
New York 26	Edwin B. Dooley	Republican	1956	Incumbent re-elected.	▌ ✓ Edwin B. Dooley (Republican) 52.6%; ▌Phil E. Gilbert Jr. (Democratic) 47.4%
New York 27	Robert R. Barry	Republican	1958	Incumbent re-elected.	▌ ✓ Robert R. Barry (Republican) 56.3%; ▌John R. Harold (Democratic) 40.3%; ▌Hermoine P. Mokray (Liberal) 3.3%
New York 28	Katharine St. George	Republican	1946	Incumbent re-elected.	▌ ✓ Katharine St. George (Republican) 58.7%; ▌James E. Truex (Democratic) 41.3%
New York 29	J. Ernest Wharton	Republican	1950	Incumbent re-elected.	▌ ✓ J. Ernest Wharton (Republican) 56.7%; ▌Gore Vidal (Democratic) 43.3%
New York 30	Leo W. O'Brien	Democratic	1952	Incumbent re-elected.	▌ ✓ Leo W. O'Brien (Democratic) 62.9%; ▌Irving I. Waxman (Republican) 37.1%
New York 31	Dean P. Taylor	Republican	1942	Incumbent retired. Republican hold.	▌ ✓ Carleton J. King (Republican) 60.4%; ▌Louis E. Wolfe (Democratic) 39.6%
New York 32	Samuel S. Stratton	Democratic	1958	Incumbent re-elected.	▌ ✓ Samuel S. Stratton (Democratic) 62.3%; ▌W. Clyde Wright (Republican) 37.7%
New York 33	Clarence E. Kilburn	Republican	1940	Incumbent re-elected.	▌ ✓ Clarence E. Kilburn (Republican) 61.9%; ▌Edward J. Gosier (Democratic) 35.9%; ▌Winfred Harberson (Liberal) 2.3%
New York 34	Alexander Pirnie	Republican	1958	Incumbent re-elected.	▌ ✓ Alexander Pirnie (Republican) 55.3%; ▌Edwin L. Slusarczyk (Democratic) 44.7%
New York 35	R. Walter Riehlman	Republican	1946	Incumbent re-elected.	▌ ✓ R. Walter Riehlman (Republican) 53.8%; ▌Jerome M. Wilson (Democratic) 44.6%; ▌Gerard J. Felter (Liberal) 1.6%
New York 36	John Taber	Republican	1922	Incumbent re-elected.	▌ ✓ John Taber (Republican) 52.6%; ▌Francis J. Souhan (Democratic) 47.4%
New York 37	Howard W. Robison	Republican	1958	Incumbent re-elected.	▌ ✓ Howard W. Robison (Republican) 63.4%; ▌Joseph V. Julian (Democratic) 36.6%
New York 38	Jessica M. Weis	Republican	1958	Incumbent re-elected.	▌ ✓ Jessica M. Weis (Republican) 57.6%; ▌Arthur B. Curran Jr. (Democratic) 42.4%
New York 39	Harold C. Ostertag	Republican	1950	Incumbent re-elected.	▌ ✓ Harold C. Ostertag (Republican) 59.7%; ▌Henry R. Dutcher Jr. (Democratic) 40.3%
New York 40	William E. Miller	Republican	1950	Incumbent re-elected.	▌ ✓ William E. Miller (Republican) 53.6%; ▌Mariano A. Lucca (Democratic) 43.5%; ▌Albert J. Taylor (Liberal) 2.9%
New York 41	Thaddeus J. Dulski	Democratic	1958	Incumbent re-elected.	▌ ✓ Thaddeus J. Dulski (Democratic) 56.2%; ▌Ralph J. Radwan (Republican) 43.8%
New York 42	John R. Pillion	Republican	1952	Incumbent re-elected.	▌ ✓ John R. Pillion (Republican) 55.4%; ▌Charles J. McCabe (Democratic) 42.4%; ▌James A. Peck (Liberal) 2.3%
New York 43	Charles Goodell	Republican	1959	Incumbent re-elected.	▌ ✓ Charles Goodell (Republican) 62.8%; ▌T. Joseph Lynch (Democratic) 34.7%; ▌Elmer Olson (Liberal) 2.5%

== North Carolina ==
District	Incumbent			This race	
District	Member	Party	First elected	Results	Candidates
North Carolina 1	Herbert C. Bonner	Democratic	1940	Incumbent re-elected.	▌ ✓ Herbert C. Bonner (Democratic) 86.5%; ▌Zeno O. Ratcliff (Republican) 13.5%
North Carolina 2	Lawrence H. Fountain	Democratic	1952	Incumbent re-elected.	▌ ✓ Lawrence H. Fountain (Democratic) 87.8%; ▌L. Paul Goodling (Republican) 12.2%
North Carolina 3	Graham A. Barden	Democratic	1934	Incumbent retired. Democratic hold.	▌ ✓ David N. Henderson (Democratic) 71.2%; ▌Jack D. Brinson (Republican) 28.8%
North Carolina 4	Harold D. Cooley	Democratic	1934	Incumbent re-elected.	▌ ✓ Harold D. Cooley (Democratic) 66.6%; ▌Elam Reaumuel Temple Jr. (Republican) 33.4%
North Carolina 5	Ralph James Scott	Democratic	1956	Incumbent re-elected.	▌ ✓ Ralph James Scott (Democratic) 57.6%; ▌Russell F. Biggam (Republican) 42.4%
North Carolina 6	Carl T. Durham	Democratic	1938	Incumbent retired. Democratic hold.	▌ ✓ Horace R. Kornegay (Democratic) 59.6%; ▌Holland L. Robb (Republican) 40.4%
North Carolina 7	Alton Lennon	Democratic	1956	Incumbent re-elected.	▌ ✓ Alton Lennon (Democratic) 76.5%; ▌Joel C. Clifton (Republican) 23.5%
North Carolina 8	Alvin Paul Kitchin	Democratic	1956	Incumbent re-elected.	▌ ✓ Alvin Paul Kitchin (Democratic) 56.3%; ▌A. M. Snipes (Republican) 43.7%
North Carolina 9	Hugh Quincy Alexander	Democratic	1952	Incumbent re-elected.	▌ ✓ Hugh Quincy Alexander (Democratic) 53.1%; ▌W. S. Bogle (Republican) 46.9%
North Carolina 10	Charles R. Jonas	Republican	1952	Incumbent re-elected.	▌ ✓ Charles R. Jonas (Republican) 58.6%; ▌David Clark (Democratic) 41.4%
North Carolina 11	Basil Lee Whitener	Democratic	1956	Incumbent re-elected.	▌ ✓ Basil Lee Whitener (Democratic) 61.1%; ▌Kelly Dixon (Republican) 38.9%
North Carolina 12	Roy A. Taylor	Democratic	1960 (special)	Incumbent re-elected.	▌ ✓ Roy A. Taylor (Democratic) 52.0%; ▌Heinz Rollman (Republican) 48.0%

== North Dakota ==
District	Incumbent			This race	
District	Member	Party	First elected	Results	Candidates
North Dakota at-large	Don L. Short	Republican	1958	Incumbent re-elected.	▌ ✓ Don L. Short (Republican) 27.5%; ▌ ✓ Hjalmar Carl Nygaard (Republican) 25.8%; ▌Raymond Vendsel (Democratic-NPL) 24.5%; ▌Anson J. Anderson (Democratic-NPL) 22.2%
North Dakota at-large	Quentin Burdick	Democratic-NPL	1958	Incumbent resigned August 8, 1960 when elected U.S. senator. Republican gain.	▌ ✓ Don L. Short (Republican) 27.5%; ▌ ✓ Hjalmar Carl Nygaard (Republican) 25.8%; ▌Raymond Vendsel (Democratic-NPL) 24.5%; ▌Anson J. Anderson (Democratic-NPL) 22.2%

== Ohio ==
District	Incumbent			This race	
District	Member	Party	First elected	Results	Candidates
Ohio 1	Gordon H. Scherer	Republican	1952	Incumbent re-elected.	▌ ✓ Gordon H. Scherer (Republican) 58.9%; ▌W. Ted Osborne (Democratic) 41.1%
Ohio 2	William E. Hess	Republican	1950	Incumbent retired. Republican hold.	▌ ✓ Donald D. Clancy (Republican) 57.4%; ▌H. A. Sand (Democratic) 42.6%
Ohio 3	Paul F. Schenck	Republican	1951	Incumbent re-elected.	▌ ✓ Paul F. Schenck (Republican) 62.0%; ▌R. William Patterson (Democratic) 38.0%
Ohio 4	William McCulloch	Republican	1947	Incumbent re-elected.	▌ ✓ William McCulloch (Republican) 65.4%; ▌Joseph J. Murphy (Democratic) 34.6%
Ohio 5	Del Latta	Republican	1958	Incumbent re-elected.	▌ ✓ Del Latta (Republican) 67.3%; ▌Tom T. McRitchie (Democratic) 32.7%
Ohio 6	James G. Polk	Democratic	1948	Incumbent died April 28, 1959. Republican gain.	▌ ✓ Bill Harsha (Republican) 55.2%; ▌Franklin E. Smith (Democratic) 44.8%
Ohio 7	Clarence J. Brown	Republican	1938	Incumbent re-elected.	▌ ✓ Clarence J. Brown (Republican) 65.4%; ▌Joseph A. Sullivan (Democratic) 34.6%
Ohio 8	Jackson E. Betts	Republican	1950	Incumbent re-elected.	▌ ✓ Jackson E. Betts (Republican) 67.7%; ▌Virgil M. Gase (Democratic) 32.3%
Ohio 9	Thomas L. Ashley	Democratic	1954	Incumbent re-elected.	▌ ✓ Thomas L. Ashley (Democratic) 56.9%; ▌Howard C. Cook (Republican) 43.1%
Ohio 10	Walter H. Moeller	Democratic	1958	Incumbent re-elected.	▌ ✓ Walter H. Moeller (Democratic) 52.5%; ▌Oakley C. Collins (Republican) 47.5%
Ohio 11	Robert E. Cook	Democratic	1958	Incumbent re-elected.	▌ ✓ Robert E. Cook (Democratic) 51.0%; ▌David S. Dennison Jr. (Republican) 49.0%
Ohio 12	Samuel L. Devine	Republican	1958	Incumbent re-elected.	▌ ✓ Samuel L. Devine (Republican) 60.7%; ▌Richard E. Liming (Democratic) 39.3%
Ohio 13	A. David Baumhart Jr.	Republican	1954	Incumbent retired. Republican hold.	▌ ✓ Charles A. Mosher (Republican) 51.4%; ▌J. William McCray (Democratic) 48.6%
Ohio 14	William H. Ayres	Republican	1950	Incumbent re-elected.	▌ ✓ William H. Ayres (Republican) 61.5%; ▌John H. Mihaly (Democratic) 38.5%
Ohio 15	John E. Henderson	Republican	1954	Incumbent retired. Republican hold.	▌ ✓ Tom Moorehead (Republican) 51.2%; ▌Herbert U. Smith (Democratic) 48.8%
Ohio 16	Frank T. Bow	Republican	1950	Incumbent re-elected.	▌ ✓ Frank T. Bow (Republican) 62.5%; ▌John G. Freedom (Democratic) 37.5%
Ohio 17	Robert W. Levering	Democratic	1958	Incumbent lost re-election. Republican gain.	▌ ✓ John M. Ashbrook (Republican) 53.0%; ▌Robert W. Levering (Democratic) 47.0%
Ohio 18	Wayne Hays	Democratic	1948	Incumbent re-elected.	▌ ✓ Wayne Hays (Democratic) 65.6%; ▌Walter J. Hunston (Republican) 34.4%
Ohio 19	Michael J. Kirwan	Democratic	1936	Incumbent re-elected.	▌ ✓ Michael J. Kirwan (Democratic) 68.9%; ▌Paul E. Stevens (Republican) 31.1%
Ohio 20	Michael A. Feighan	Democratic	1942	Incumbent re-elected.	▌ ✓ Michael A. Feighan (Democratic) 67.8%; ▌Leonard G. Richter (Republican) 32.2%
Ohio 21	Charles Vanik	Democratic	1954	Incumbent re-elected.	▌ ✓ Charles Vanik (Democratic) 73.0%; ▌William O. Walker (Republican) 27.0%
Ohio 22	Frances P. Bolton	Republican	1940	Incumbent re-elected.	▌ ✓ Frances P. Bolton (Republican) 56.9%; ▌Chat Paterson (Democratic) 43.1%
Ohio 23	William E. Minshall Jr.	Republican	1954	Incumbent re-elected.	▌ ✓ William E. Minshall Jr. (Republican) 67.3%; ▌Daniel Winston (Democratic) 32.7%

== Oklahoma ==
District	Incumbent			This race	
District	Member	Party	First elected	Results	Candidates
Oklahoma 1	Page Belcher	Republican	1950	Incumbent re-elected.	▌ ✓ Page Belcher (Republican) 63.8%; ▌Yates Land (Democratic) 36.2%
Oklahoma 2	Ed Edmondson	Democratic	1952	Incumbent re-elected.	▌ ✓ Ed Edmondson (Democratic) 57.0%; ▌Bill Sharp (Republican) 43.0%
Oklahoma 3	Carl Albert	Democratic	1946	Incumbent re-elected.	▌ ✓ Carl Albert (Democratic) 74.9%; ▌George B. Sherritt (Republican) 25.1%
Oklahoma 4	Tom Steed	Democratic	1948	Incumbent re-elected.	▌ ✓ Tom Steed (Democratic) 60.7%; ▌Don H. Crall (Republican) 39.3%
Oklahoma 5	John Jarman	Democratic	1950	Incumbent re-elected.	▌ ✓ John Jarman (Democratic) 66.6%; ▌Hobart H. Hobbs (Republican) 33.4%
Oklahoma 6	Toby Morris	Democratic	1956	Incumbent lost renomination. Democratic hold.	▌ ✓ Victor Wickersham (Democratic) 50.0%; ▌Clyde Wheeler Jr. (Republican) 50.0%

== Oregon ==
District	Incumbent			This race	
District	Member	Party	First elected	Results	Candidates
Oregon 1	A. Walter Norblad	Republican	1946	Incumbent re-elected.	▌ ✓ A. Walter Norblad (Republican) 65.1%; ▌Marv Owens (Democratic) 34.9%
Oregon 2	Al Ullman	Democratic	1956	Incumbent re-elected.	▌ ✓ Al Ullman (Democratic) 59.6%; ▌Ronald E. Phair (Republican) 40.4%
Oregon 3	Edith Green	Democratic	1954	Incumbent re-elected.	▌ ✓ Edith Green (Democratic) 63.9%; ▌Wallace L. Lee (Republican) 36.1%
Oregon 4	Charles O. Porter	Democratic	1956	Incumbent lost re-election. Republican gain.	▌ ✓ Edwin Durno (Republican) 51.1%; ▌Charles O. Porter (Democratic) 48.9%

== Pennsylvania ==
District	Incumbent			This race	
District	Member	Party	First elected	Results	Candidates
Pennsylvania 1	William A. Barrett	Democratic	1944; 1946 (lost); 1948	Incumbent re-elected.	▌ ✓ William A. Barrett (Democratic) 77.0%; ▌Michael Grasso Jr. (Republican) 23.0%
Pennsylvania 2	Kathryn E. Granahan	Democratic	1956	Incumbent re-elected.	▌ ✓ Kathryn E. Granahan (Democratic) 72.3%; ▌Joseph C. Bruno (Republican) 27.7%
Pennsylvania 3	James A. Byrne	Democratic	1952	Incumbent re-elected.	▌ ✓ James A. Byrne (Democratic) 69.7%; ▌Joseph P. Gorham (Republican) 30.3%
Pennsylvania 4	Robert N. C. Nix Sr.	Democratic	1958	Incumbent re-elected.	▌ ✓ Robert N. C. Nix Sr. (Democratic) 78.4%; ▌Clarence M. Smith (Republican) 22.6%
Pennsylvania 5	William J. Green Jr.	Democratic	1944	Incumbent re-elected.	▌ ✓ William J. Green Jr. (Democratic) 61.0%; ▌James W. Gilmour (Republican) 39.0%
Pennsylvania 6	Herman Toll	Democratic	1958	Incumbent re-elected.	▌ ✓ Herman Toll (Democratic) 59.6%; ▌David O. Maxwell (Republican) 40.4%
Pennsylvania 7	William H. Milliken Jr.	Republican	1958	Incumbent re-elected.	▌ ✓ William H. Milliken Jr. (Republican) 53.0%; ▌Henry Couley (Democratic) 47.0%
Pennsylvania 8	Willard S. Curtin	Republican	1956	Incumbent re-elected.	▌ ✓ Willard S. Curtin (Republican) 56.1%; ▌Donald V. Hock (Democratic) 43.9%
Pennsylvania 9	Paul B. Dague	Republican	1946	Incumbent re-elected.	▌ ✓ Paul B. Dague (Republican) 66.6%; ▌Howard W. Halsey (Democratic) 33.4%
Pennsylvania 10	Stanley A. Prokop	Democratic	1958	Incumbent lost re-election. Republican gain.	▌ ✓ William Scranton (Republican) 54.8%; ▌Stanley A. Prokop (Democratic) 45.2%
Pennsylvania 11	Dan Flood	Democratic	1944; 1946 (lost); 1948; 1952 (lost); 1954	Incumbent re-elected.	▌ ✓ Dan Flood (Democratic) 67.1%; ▌Donald B. Ayers (Republican) 32.9%
Pennsylvania 12	Ivor D. Fenton	Republican	1938	Incumbent re-elected.	▌ ✓ Ivor D. Fenton (Republican) 52.4%; ▌William H. Deitman (Democratic) 47.6%
Pennsylvania 13	John A. Lafore Jr.	Republican	1956	Incumbent lost renomination. Republican hold.	▌ ✓ Richard Schweiker (Republican) 61.8%; ▌Warren M. Ballard (Democratic) 38.2%
Pennsylvania 14	George M. Rhodes	Democratic	1948	Incumbent re-elected.	▌ ✓ George M. Rhodes (Democratic) 53.8%; ▌James H. Mantis (Republican) 46.2%
Pennsylvania 15	Francis E. Walter	Democratic	1932	Incumbent re-elected.	▌ ✓ Francis E. Walter (Democratic) 55.2%; ▌Woodrow A. Horn (Republican) 44.8%
Pennsylvania 16	Walter M. Mumma	Republican	1950	Incumbent re-elected.	▌ ✓ Walter M. Mumma (Republican) 62.5%; ▌Miles Albright (Democratic) 37.5%
Pennsylvania 17	Herman T. Schneebeli	Republican	1960 (special)	Incumbent re-elected.	▌ ✓ Herman T. Schneebeli (Republican) 56.7%; ▌Dean R. Fisher (Democratic) 43.3%
Pennsylvania 18	Douglas Elliott	Republican	1960 (special)	Incumbent died June 19, 1960. Republican hold. Winner was also elected to finish the term; see above.	▌ ✓ J. Irving Whalley (Republican) 62.3%; ▌D. Patrick Ahern (Democratic) 37.7%
Pennsylvania 19	James M. Quigley	Democratic	1958	Incumbent lost re-election. Republican gain.	▌ ✓ George A. Goodling (Republican) 53.2%; ▌James M. Quigley (Democratic) 46.8%
Pennsylvania 20	James E. Van Zandt	Republican	1946	Incumbent re-elected.	▌ ✓ James E. Van Zandt (Republican) 67.8%; ▌Robert N. Hendershot (Democratic) 32.2%
Pennsylvania 21	John Herman Dent	Democratic	1958	Incumbent re-elected.	▌ ✓ John Herman Dent (Democratic) 56.0%; ▌William L. Batten (Republican) 42.3%; ▌Angelo P. Vitello (Independent Anti-Tax) 1.7%
Pennsylvania 22	John P. Saylor	Republican	1948	Incumbent re-elected.	▌ ✓ John P. Saylor (Republican) 57.3%; ▌William D. Patton (Democratic) 42.7%
Pennsylvania 23	Leon H. Gavin	Republican	1942	Incumbent re-elected.	▌ ✓ Leon H. Gavin (Republican) 62.4%; ▌John H. Cartwright (Democratic) 36.8%; ▌Eugene Kern (Prohibition) 0.8%
Pennsylvania 24	Carroll D. Kearns	Republican	1946	Incumbent re-elected.	▌ ✓ Carroll D. Kearns (Republican) 51.0%; ▌Chester C. Hampton (Democratic) 49.0%
Pennsylvania 25	Frank M. Clark	Democratic	1954	Incumbent re-elected.	▌ ✓ Frank M. Clark (Democratic) 58.1%; ▌Fred A. Obley (Republican) 41.9%
Pennsylvania 26	Thomas E. Morgan	Democratic	1944	Incumbent re-elected.	▌ ✓ Thomas E. Morgan (Democratic) 63.6%; ▌Bartley P. Osborne (Republican) 36.4%
Pennsylvania 27	James G. Fulton	Republican	1944	Incumbent re-elected.	▌ ✓ James G. Fulton (Republican) 59.1%; ▌Margaret L. Walgren (Democratic) 40.9%
Pennsylvania 28	William S. Moorhead	Democratic	1958	Incumbent re-elected.	▌ ✓ William S. Moorhead (Democratic) 67.8%; ▌Arthur O. Sharron (Republican) 32.2%
Pennsylvania 29	Robert J. Corbett	Republican	1938; 1940 (lost); 1944	Incumbent re-elected.	▌ ✓ Robert J. Corbett (Republican) 59.2%; ▌Russell M. Douthett (Democratic) 40.8%
Pennsylvania 30	Elmer J. Holland	Democratic	1942 (special); 1942 (retired); 1956 (special)	Incumbent re-elected.	▌ ✓ Elmer J. Holland (Democratic) 68.6%; ▌Jerome M. Meyers (Republican) 31.4%

== Rhode Island ==
District	Incumbent			This race	
District	Member	Party	First elected	Results	Candidates
Rhode Island 1	Aime Forand	Democratic	1940	Incumbent retired. Democratic hold.	▌ ✓ Fernand St Germain (Democratic) 66.2%; ▌Theophile Martin (Republican) 33.8%
Rhode Island 2	John E. Fogarty	Democratic	1940	Incumbent re-elected.	▌ ✓ John E. Fogarty (Democratic) 70.4%; ▌Robert L. Gammell (Republican) 29.6%

== South Carolina ==
District	Incumbent			This race	
District	Member	Party	First elected	Results	Candidates
South Carolina 1	L. Mendel Rivers	Democratic	1940	Incumbent re-elected.	▌ ✓ L. Mendel Rivers (Democratic); Uncontested
South Carolina 2	John J. Riley	Democratic	1950	Incumbent re-elected.	▌ ✓ John J. Riley (Democratic); Uncontested
South Carolina 3	William J. B. Dorn	Democratic	1946; 1948 (retired); 1950	Incumbent re-elected.	▌ ✓ William J. B. Dorn (Democratic); Uncontested
South Carolina 4	Robert T. Ashmore	Democratic	1953	Incumbent re-elected.	▌ ✓ Robert T. Ashmore (Democratic); Uncontested
South Carolina 5	Robert W. Hemphill	Democratic	1956	Incumbent re-elected.	▌ ✓ Robert W. Hemphill (Democratic); Uncontested
South Carolina 6	John L. McMillan	Democratic	1938	Incumbent re-elected.	▌ ✓ John L. McMillan (Democratic); Uncontested

== South Dakota ==
District	Incumbent			This race	
District	Member	Party	First elected	Results	Candidates
South Dakota 1	George McGovern	Democratic	1956	Retired to run for U.S. senator. Republican gain.	▌ ✓ Ben Reifel (Republican) 54.8%; ▌Ray Fitzgerald (Democratic) 45.2%
South Dakota 2	E. Y. Berry	Republican	1950	Incumbent re-elected.	▌ ✓ E. Y. Berry (Republican) 59.7%; ▌W. H. Raff (Democratic) 40.3%

== Tennessee ==
District	Incumbent			This race	
District	Member	Party	First elected	Results	Candidates
Tennessee 1	B. Carroll Reece	Republican	1950	Incumbent re-elected.	▌ ✓ B. Carroll Reece (Republican) 75.4%; ▌Arthur Bright (Democratic) 24.6%
Tennessee 2	Howard Baker Sr.	Republican	1950	Incumbent re-elected.	▌ ✓ Howard Baker Sr. (Republican); Uncontested
Tennessee 3	James B. Frazier Jr.	Democratic	1948	Incumbent re-elected.	▌ ✓ James B. Frazier Jr. (Democratic); Uncontested
Tennessee 4	Joe L. Evins	Democratic	1946	Incumbent re-elected.	▌ ✓ Joe L. Evins (Democratic); Uncontested
Tennessee 5	J. Carlton Loser	Democratic	1956	Incumbent re-elected.	▌ ✓ J. Carlton Loser (Democratic); Uncontested
Tennessee 6	Ross Bass	Democratic	1954	Incumbent re-elected.	▌ ✓ Ross Bass (Democratic); Uncontested
Tennessee 7	Tom J. Murray	Democratic	1942	Incumbent re-elected.	▌ ✓ Tom J. Murray (Democratic); Uncontested
Tennessee 8	Fats Everett	Democratic	1958	Incumbent re-elected.	▌ ✓ Fats Everett (Democratic); Uncontested
Tennessee 9	Clifford Davis	Democratic	1940	Incumbent re-elected.	▌ ✓ Clifford Davis (Democratic); Uncontested

== Texas ==
District	Incumbent			This race	
District	Member	Party	First elected	Results	Candidates
Texas 1	Wright Patman	Democratic	1928	Incumbent re-elected.	▌ ✓ Wright Patman (Democratic); Uncontested
Texas 2	Jack Brooks	Democratic	1952	Incumbent re-elected.	▌ ✓ Jack Brooks (Democratic) 69.7%; ▌Fred S. Neumann (Republican) 29.9%; ▌Robert E. Allen (Constitution) 0.4%
Texas 3	Lindley Beckworth	Democratic	1956	Incumbent re-elected.	▌ ✓ Lindley Beckworth (Democratic); Uncontested
Texas 4	Sam Rayburn	Democratic	1912	Incumbent re-elected.	▌ ✓ Sam Rayburn (Democratic); Uncontested
Texas 5	Bruce Alger	Republican	1954	Incumbent re-elected.	▌ ✓ Bruce Alger (Republican) 57.3%; ▌Joe R. Pool (Democratic) 42.7%
Texas 6	Olin E. Teague	Democratic	1946	Incumbent re-elected.	▌ ✓ Olin E. Teague (Democratic); Uncontested
Texas 7	John Dowdy	Democratic	1952	Incumbent re-elected.	▌ ✓ John Dowdy (Democratic); Uncontested
Texas 8	Albert Thomas	Democratic	1936	Incumbent re-elected.	▌ ✓ Albert Thomas (Democratic) 68.6%; ▌Anthony J. P. Farris (Republican) 21.9%; ▌Robert E. Nesmith (Constitution) 9.5%
Texas 9	Clark W. Thompson	Democratic	1947	Incumbent re-elected.	▌ ✓ Clark W. Thompson (Democratic) 94.0%; ▌Paul D. Rogers (Constitution) 6.0%
Texas 10	Homer Thornberry	Democratic	1948	Incumbent re-elected.	▌ ✓ Homer Thornberry (Democratic) 98.1%; ▌Roy R. Brown (Constitution) 1.9%
Texas 11	William R. Poage	Democratic	1936	Incumbent re-elected.	▌ ✓ William R. Poage (Democratic); Uncontested
Texas 12	Jim Wright	Democratic	1954	Incumbent re-elected.	▌ ✓ Jim Wright (Democratic); Uncontested
Texas 13	Frank N. Ikard	Democratic	1951	Incumbent re-elected.	▌ ✓ Frank N. Ikard (Democratic); Uncontested
Texas 14	John Young	Democratic	1956	Incumbent re-elected.	▌ ✓ John Young (Democratic); Uncontested
Texas 15	Joe M. Kilgore	Democratic	1954	Incumbent re-elected.	▌ ✓ Joe M. Kilgore (Democratic); Uncontested
Texas 16	J. T. Rutherford	Democratic	1954	Incumbent re-elected.	▌ ✓ J. T. Rutherford (Democratic) 58.9%; ▌Dorothy Wyvell (Constitution) 23.1%; ▌Ford Chapman (Republican) 18.0%
Texas 17	Omar Burleson	Democratic	1946	Incumbent re-elected.	▌ ✓ Omar Burleson (Democratic) 77.8%; ▌Max V. Mossholder (Republican) 22.2%
Texas 18	Walter E. Rogers	Democratic	1950	Incumbent re-elected.	▌ ✓ Walter E. Rogers (Democratic); Uncontested
Texas 19	George H. Mahon	Democratic	1934	Incumbent re-elected.	▌ ✓ George H. Mahon (Democratic) 85.7%; ▌John R. Anderson (Constitution) 14.3%
Texas 20	Paul J. Kilday	Democratic	1938	Incumbent re-elected.	▌ ✓ Paul J. Kilday (Democratic); Uncontested
Texas 21	O. C. Fisher	Democratic	1942	Incumbent re-elected.	▌ ✓ O. C. Fisher (Democratic); Uncontested
Texas 22	Robert R. Casey	Democratic	1958	Incumbent re-elected.	▌ ✓ Robert R. Casey (Democratic) 58.3%; ▌James Carter Noonan (Republican) 39.2%; ▌D. F. Vancleve (Constitution) 2.5%

== Utah ==
District	Incumbent			This race	
District	Member	Party	First elected	Results	Candidates
Utah 1	Henry Aldous Dixon	Republican	1954	Incumbent retired. Democratic gain.	▌ ✓ M. Blaine Peterson (Democratic) 50.0%; ▌A. Walter Stevenson (Republican) 50.0%
Utah 2	David S. King	Democratic	1958	Incumbent re-elected.	▌ ✓ David S. King (Democratic) 50.8%; ▌Sherman P. Lloyd (Republican) 49.2%

== Vermont ==
Results by county

District	Incumbent			This race	
District	Member	Party	First elected	Results	Candidates
Vermont at-large	William H. Meyer	Democratic	1958	Incumbent lost re-election. Republican gain.	▌ ✓ Robert Stafford (Republican) 57.2%; ▌William H. Meyer (Democratic) 42.8%

== Virginia ==
District	Incumbent			This race	
District	Member	Party	First elected	Results	Candidates
Virginia 1	Thomas N. Downing	Democratic	1958	Incumbent re-elected.	▌ ✓ Thomas N. Downing (Democratic) 82.5%; ▌Richard A. May (Republican) 17.5%
Virginia 2	Porter Hardy Jr.	Democratic	1946	Incumbent re-elected.	▌ ✓ Porter Hardy Jr. (Democratic) 75.9%; ▌Louis B. Fine (Republican) 24.1%
Virginia 3	J. Vaughan Gary	Democratic	1945	Incumbent re-elected.	▌ ✓ J. Vaughan Gary (Democratic) 78.0%; ▌T. Coleman Andrews (write-in) 22.0%
Virginia 4	Watkins Abbitt	Democratic	1948	Incumbent re-elected.	▌ ✓ Watkins Abbitt (Democratic); Uncontested
Virginia 5	William M. Tuck	Democratic	1953	Incumbent re-elected.	▌ ✓ William M. Tuck (Democratic); Uncontested
Virginia 6	Richard H. Poff	Republican	1952	Incumbent re-elected.	▌ ✓ Richard H. Poff (Republican) 82.6%; ▌J. B. Brayman (Social Democratic) 17.4%
Virginia 7	Burr Harrison	Democratic	1946	Incumbent re-elected.	▌ ✓ Burr Harrison (Democratic); Uncontested
Virginia 8	Howard W. Smith	Democratic	1930	Incumbent re-elected.	▌ ✓ Howard W. Smith (Democratic) 76.1%; ▌Lawrence M. Traylor (Republican) 23.9%
Virginia 9	W. Pat Jennings	Democratic	1954	Incumbent re-elected.	▌ ✓ W. Pat Jennings (Democratic) 58.0%; ▌E. Summers Sheffey (Republican) 42.0%
Virginia 10	Joel Broyhill	Republican	1952	Incumbent re-elected.	▌ ✓ Joel Broyhill (Republican) 55.0%; ▌Ralph Kaul (Democratic) 45.0%

== Washington ==
District	Incumbent			This race	
District	Member	Party	First elected	Results	Candidates
Washington 1	Thomas Pelly	Republican	1952	Incumbent re-elected.	▌ ✓ Thomas Pelly (Republican) 70.2%; ▌Carl V. Holman (Democratic) 29.8%
Washington 2	Jack Westland	Republican	1952	Incumbent re-elected.	▌ ✓ Jack Westland (Republican) 60.2%; ▌Payson Peterson (Democratic) 39.8%
Washington 3	Russell V. Mack	Republican	1947 (special)	Incumbent died March 28, 1960. Democratic gain. Winner was also elected to finish the term; see above.	▌ ✓ Julia Butler Hansen (Democratic) 53.4%; ▌Dale M. Nordquist (Republican) 46.6%
Washington 4	Catherine Dean May	Republican	1958	Incumbent re-elected.	▌ ✓ Catherine Dean May (Republican) 58.8%; ▌Roy Mundy (Democratic) 41.2%
Washington 5	Walt Horan	Republican	1942	Incumbent re-elected.	▌ ✓ Walt Horan (Republican) 59.4%; ▌Bernard J. Gallagher (Democratic) 40.6%
Washington 6	Thor C. Tollefson	Republican	1946	Incumbent re-elected.	▌ ✓ Thor C. Tollefson (Republican) 56.4%; ▌John T. McCutcheon (Democratic) 43.6%
Washington 7	Don Magnuson	Democratic	1952	Incumbent re-elected.	▌ ✓ Don Magnuson (Democratic) 50.0%; ▌John Stender (Republican) 50.0%

== West Virginia ==
District	Incumbent			This race	
District	Member	Party	First elected	Results	Candidates
West Virginia 1	Arch A. Moore Jr.	Republican	1956	Incumbent re-elected.	▌ ✓ Arch A. Moore Jr. (Republican) 60.3%; ▌Steven D. Narick (Democratic) 39.7%
West Virginia 2	Harley Orrin Staggers	Democratic	1948	Incumbent re-elected.	▌ ✓ Harley Orrin Staggers (Democratic) 60.3%; ▌Charles J. Whiston (Republican) 39.7%
West Virginia 3	Cleveland M. Bailey	Democratic	1948	Incumbent re-elected.	▌ ✓ Cleveland M. Bailey (Democratic) 59.8%; ▌James M. Knowles Jr. (Republican) 40.2%
West Virginia 4	Ken Hechler	Democratic	1958	Incumbent re-elected.	▌ ✓ Ken Hechler (Democratic) 53.2%; ▌Clyde Pinson (Republican) 46.8%
West Virginia 5	Elizabeth Kee	Democratic	1951 (special)	Incumbent re-elected.	▌ ✓ Elizabeth Kee (Democratic) 69.5%; ▌L. M. LaFollette (Republican) 30.5%
West Virginia 6	John M. Slack Jr.	Democratic	1958	Incumbent re-elected.	▌ ✓ John M. Slack Jr. (Democratic) 61.8%; ▌George W. King (Republican) 38.2%

== Wisconsin ==
District	Incumbent			This race	
District	Member	Party	First elected	Results	Candidates
Wisconsin 1	Gerald T. Flynn	Democratic	1958	Incumbent lost re-election. Republican gain.	▌ ✓ Henry C. Schadeberg (Republican) 52.7%; ▌Gerald T. Flynn (Democratic) 47.3%
Wisconsin 2	Robert Kastenmeier	Democratic	1958	Incumbent re-elected.	▌ ✓ Robert Kastenmeier (Democratic) 53.4%; ▌Donald E. Tewes (Republican) 46.6%
Wisconsin 3	Gardner R. Withrow	Republican	1948	Incumbent retired. Republican hold.	▌ ✓ Vernon W. Thomson (Republican) 54.6%; ▌Norman Clapp (Democratic) 45.4%
Wisconsin 4	Clement Zablocki	Democratic	1948	Incumbent re-elected.	▌ ✓ Clement Zablocki (Democratic) 71.7%; ▌Samuel P. Murray (Republican) 28.3%
Wisconsin 5	Henry S. Reuss	Democratic	1954	Incumbent re-elected.	▌ ✓ Henry S. Reuss (Democratic) 57.7%; ▌Kirby Hendee (Republican) 42.3%
Wisconsin 6	William Van Pelt	Republican	1950	Incumbent re-elected.	▌ ✓ William Van Pelt (Republican) 55.8%; ▌James Megellas (Democratic) 44.2%
Wisconsin 7	Melvin Laird	Republican	1952	Incumbent re-elected.	▌ ✓ Melvin Laird (Republican) 67.1%; ▌Kenneth Traeger (Democratic) 32.9%
Wisconsin 8	John W. Byrnes	Republican	1944	Incumbent re-elected.	▌ ✓ John W. Byrnes (Republican) 58.8%; ▌Milo Singler (Democratic) 41.2%
Wisconsin 9	Lester Johnson	Democratic	1953	Incumbent re-elected.	▌ ✓ Lester Johnson (Democratic) 56.5%; ▌Perry M. Hull (Republican) 43.5%
Wisconsin 10	Alvin O'Konski	Republican	1942	Incumbent re-elected.	▌ ✓ Alvin O'Konski (Republican) 95.3%; ▌John B. Chapple (write-in) 4.7%

== Wyoming ==
District	Incumbent			This race	
District	Member	Party	First elected	Results	Candidates
Wyoming at-large	Keith Thomson	Republican	1954	Incumbent retired to run for U.S. senator. Republican hold.	▌ ✓ William Henry Harrison III (Republican) 52.3%; ▌Hepburn T. Armstrong (Democratic) 47.7%

== See also ==
- 1960 United States elections
  - 1960 United States Senate elections
- 86th United States Congress
- 87th United States Congress

== Works cited ==
- Abramson, Paul; Aldrich, John; Rohde, David (1995). Change and Continuity in the 1992 Elections. CQ Press. ISBN 0871878399.
