= Bud Shuster =

American politician (1932–2023)

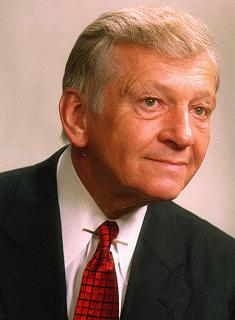

Chair of the House Transportation Committee
- In office January 4, 1995 – January 3, 2001
- Speaker: Newt Gingrich; Dennis Hastert
- Preceded by: Norman Mineta
- Succeeded by: Don Young

Chair of the House Republican Policy Committee
- In office January 3, 1979 – January 3, 1981
- Leader: John Jacob Rhodes
- Preceded by: Del M. Clawson
- Succeeded by: Dick Cheney

Member of the U.S. House of Representatives from Pennsylvania's 9th district
- In office January 3, 1973 – February 3, 2001
- Preceded by: John H. Ware III
- Succeeded by: Bill Shuster

Personal details
- Born: Elmer Greinert Shuster; January 23, 1932 Glassport, Pennsylvania, U.S.
- Died: April 19, 2023 (aged 91) Everett, Pennsylvania, U.S.
- Party: Republican
- Spouse: H. Patricia Rommel
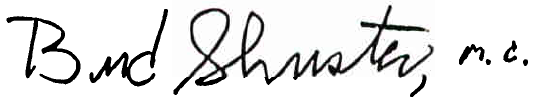
- Signature
- Bud Shuster's voice Shuster, as chair of the House Transportation Committee, speaks on the Transportation Equity Act for the 21st Century; Recorded April 1, 1998

Elmer Greinert "Bud" Shuster (/ˈʃuːstər/ SHOO-stər; January 23, 1932 – April 19, 2023) was an American politician who represented Pennsylvania's 9th congressional district in the United States House of Representatives as a Republican from 1973 to 2001. He was best known for his advocacy of transportation projects in and around his district, including Interstate 99.

== Early life and career ==
Shuster was born in the Pittsburgh suburb of Glassport, Pennsylvania, the son of Grace (née Greinert) and Prather Leroy Shuster. He received his B.A. from the University of Pittsburgh in 1954, where he became a member of Sigma Chi, an M.B.A. from Duquesne University in 1960, and a Ph.D. from American University in 1967. Shuster's official congressional biography states that he served in the United States Army from 1954 to 1956. However, in one of his several books, Believing in America, published in 1983, Shuster stated that he was the class president at the University of Pittsburgh and was recruited by the local CIA office on campus and that this was his actual first employment. Shuster described his role as that of infiltrating civil rights groups eerily similar to COINTELPRO operations of the FBI. Shuster claimed that communist groups were penetrating the civil rights movement to provoke the police into attacking the demonstrators who were marching for equal rights for African-Americans. He claimed communists did this to embarrass the United States in front of the world. His book completely contradicts his later claims to have been in the military. After leaving behind college and military life, Shuster entered the business world. He became a vice president at RCA, and he made a fortune when he started his own computer business.

== Congressional service ==
In 1972, Shuster decided to enter politics when he entered the Republican primary for the Pennsylvania's 9th Congressional District. The district had previously been the 12th, represented by five-term Republican J. Irving Whalley, who was retiring. He defeated popular state senator D. Elmer Hawbaker of Mercersburg in the Republican primary–the real contest in what has long been one of the most Republican districts in Pennsylvania. The 9th and its predecessors have been in Republican hands for all but six years since 1927. He breezed to the election that November.

Shuster's election to Congress was on the coattails of President Nixon's sweeping re-election victory. As the Watergate revelations against those closest to the president mounted, Shuster adamantly supported the president. Even after the Saturday Night Massacre, in which independent counsel Archibald Cox was fired because he refused to back down in the face of an order by the president to withdraw a subpoena for White House tapes, an event which severely eroded Congressional Republican support and set in motion the impeachment process, Shuster chose to strike out against Cox. On October 31, 1973, Shuster introduced House Resolution 677, which called for an investigation by Congress of Archibald Cox and the staff of the Special Prosecutor's office "to determine the extent of criminal violations" and send the findings to the Justice Department for prosecution. He accompanied the resolution with a statement about Cox: "This pompous, pious, self-righteous, supposedly independent special prosecutor is far worse than just political." The resolution was referred to the House Judiciary Committee on November 15, 1973, where it died. A year later, even as many Republicans went down to defeat in the face of anti-Watergate backlash, Shuster won a second term with 56 percent of the vote.

In Congress, Shuster was one of the opponents of the automobile airbag. He ran for the position of Minority Whip in 1980, losing to Trent Lott. Shuster chaired the U.S. House Committee on Transportation and Infrastructure from 1995 to 2001. He also served as Ranking Member of the House Intelligence Committee.

Shuster usually skated to re-election. His bid for a second term would be the only time he would drop below 60 percent of the vote. His most notable challenger came in 1984 when Nancy Kulp, the actress who played Miss Jane Hathaway on The Beverly Hillbillies won the Democratic nomination. Kulp, a native of Pennsylvania, had returned to her home state upon her retirement from acting and received support from her friends in Hollywood. Kulp's former co-star Buddy Ebsen, a Republican, contacted the Shuster campaign and volunteered to record radio spots declaring, "Hey Nancy, I love you dearly but you're too liberal for me – I've got to go with Bud Shuster." Shuster went on to win re-election with two-thirds of the vote. It would be the next-to-last time he would face any opposition at all; from 1986 to 2000, only one Democrat even filed to run against him.

Shuster is best known for taking on his party leadership and U.S. President Bill Clinton in the 1990s to keep more of the taxes on motor fuels and air travel in the dedicated federal trust funds they were supposed to go to by law. Shuster won both battles, even though then U.S. House Speaker Newt Gingrich and Clinton united to oppose him, wanting to keep the funds available for borrowing for other programs.

Those victories meant during his time as chairman numerous transportation projects were funded, including Interstate 99, the only Interstate highway to have its route number (a violation of the usual Interstate numbering standard) written into law. The route was later named the "Bud Shuster Highway" by Governor Robert Casey. When the transportation authorization bill known by its initials as "BESTEA" was under consideration, his fellow members joked the letters stood for the "Bud E. Shuster Transportation for All Eternity Act" for its many "pork barrel" projects. Sen. Daniel Moynihan once complained that the largest beneficiary of a 1991 highway bill was "the state of Altoona."

In 1996, Shuster was the focus of an ethics investigation by the Congressional Accountability Project stemming from the complex relationship between Representative Shuster and Ann Eppard, a former Shuster aide turned lobbyist, and Rep. Shuster's interventions with federal agencies on behalf of a business partner of his sons.

In 1998, Eppard was indicted for taking bribes to influence federal action on Boston's Big Dig highway construction project. In addition, she was accused of having embezzled money from Shuster's reelection committee when she served as its assistant treasurer. In 1999, Eppard pleaded guilty to one misdemeanor charge of receiving improper compensation and paid a $5,000 fine. Eppard died on December 24, 2005.

== Retirement ==
Shuster resigned from Congress on February 3, 2001, just a month after being sworn in for a 15th term. While he claimed health problems, he had also been forced to give up his chairmanship due to a Republican policy of a six-year term limit for committee chairmen. He was succeeded by his son Bill who was elected in a special election that May.

== After politics ==
Shuster retired from politics, but he served as Visiting Assistant Professor of Political Science at Saint Francis University in Loretto, Pennsylvania, from which he received an Honorary Doctor of Humane Letters degree. Shuster died at his farm in Everett, Pennsylvania, on April 19, 2023, at the age of 91, from complications of a hip fracture he sustained two weeks earlier.

== Published works ==
- Shuster, Bud (1983). Believing in America. New York: William Morrow and Company. ISBN 0-688-01834-3.

U.S. House of Representatives
Preceded by John H. Ware III	Member of the U.S. House of Representatives from Pennsylvania's 9th congressional district 1973–2001	Succeeded by Bill Shuster
Political offices
Preceded by Henry Hyde	Ranking Member of the House Intelligence Committee; 1991–1993	Succeeded by Larry Combest
Preceded by John Paul Hammerschmidt	Ranking Member of the House Public Works and Transportation Committee; 1993–1995	Succeeded by Norman Mineta
Preceded by Norman Mineta; California	Chairman of the House Transportation Committee; 1995–2001	Succeeded by Don Young; Alaska
