= Bernard F. Grabowski =

American politician (1923–2019)

Bernard Grabowski
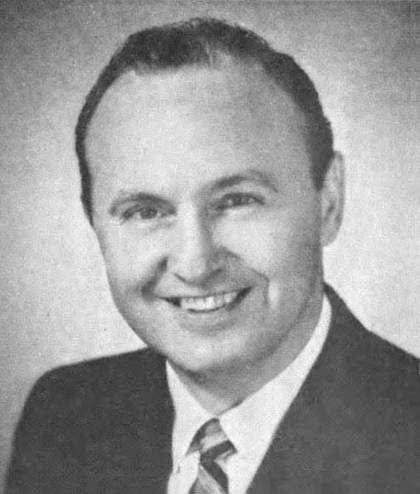

Member of the U.S. House of Representatives from Connecticut
- In office January 3, 1963 – January 3, 1967
- Preceded by: Frank Kowalski
- Succeeded by: Thomas Meskill
- Constituency: At-large (1963-1965); 6th district (1965-1967)

Personal details
- Born: Bernard Francis Grabowski; June 11, 1923 New Haven, Connecticut, U.S.
- Died: August 30, 2019 (aged 96) Bristol, Connecticut, U.S.
- Party: Democratic
- Spouse: Anne Gorski
- Education: University of Connecticut (BA, JD)

Bernard Francis Grabowski (June 11, 1923 – August 30, 2019) was an American politician who served as a two-term U.S. Representative from Connecticut.

== Biography ==
Grabowski was born in New Haven, Connecticut, attended St. Stanislaus Parochial School, and graduated from Bristol High School in Bristol, Connecticut in 1941. He served in the United States Army from 1943 to 1945. He received a B.S. degree from the University of Connecticut in 1949 and a J.D. from the University of Connecticut School of Law in 1952, and was admitted to the bar in 1953.

He served as a member of the Bristol Town Committee for eight years. He also served as councilman from 1953 to 1955, as judge of Bristol city court from 1955 to 1960, as city Coordinator of redevelopment from 1957 to 1959, and as Chief Prosecutor of the Bristol circuit court from 1960 to 1962.

In 1962, Grabowski was elected U.S. Representative from Connecticut's at-large seat as a Democrat. The at-large seat was abolished in 1964, and he was re-elected from the new Connecticut 6th District. He served in the Eighty-eighth and Eighty-ninth Congresses (January 3, 1963 – January 3, 1967).

He was an unsuccessful candidate for re-election to the Ninetieth Congress in 1966, and subsequently resumed the practice of law. He was a resident of Bristol. He died in August 2019 at the age of 96.

U.S. House of Representatives
Preceded by Frank Kowalski	Member of the U.S. House of Representatives from Connecticut's at-large congressional district 1963-1965	Succeeded by District abolished
Preceded by District created	Member of the U.S. House of Representatives from Connecticut's 6th congressional district 1965-1967	Succeeded by Thomas Meskill
