= Douglas Hemphill Elliott =

American politician (1921–1960)

Douglas Elliott
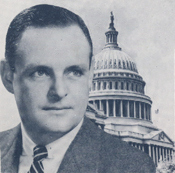

Member of the U.S. House of Representatives from Pennsylvania's 18th district
- In office April 26, 1960 – June 19, 1960
- Preceded by: Richard Simpson
- Succeeded by: Irving Whalley

Member of the Pennsylvania Senate from the 33rd district
- In office January 1, 1957 – May 4, 1960
- Preceded by: Donald McPherson, Jr.
- Succeeded by: Elmer Hawbaker

Personal details
- Born: Douglas Hemphill Elliott; June 3, 1921 Philadelphia, Pennsylvania, U.S.
- Died: June 19, 1960 (aged 39) Horse Valley, Pennsylvania, U.S.
- Party: Republican
- Spouse: Rachell Ella Peirson

Military service
- Branch/service: United States Navy
- Years of service: 1941 - 1945
- Battles/wars: World War II

Douglas Hemphill Elliott (June 3, 1921 – June 19, 1960) was a Republican member of the U.S. House of Representatives from Pennsylvania.

== Early life and education ==
Elliott was born in Philadelphia, Pennsylvania. He attended the schools of Philadelphia and graduated from the Haverford School in 1938. He attended the University of Virginia from 1938 to 1940.

== Career ==
During World War II, Elliott served in the United States Navy from 1941 until he was discharged as a chief petty officer in 1945. He worked for insurance companies from 1945 to 1952. Elliott served as director of public relations of the Franklin Institute in Philadelphia from 1950 to 1952. He served as vice president of Wilson College in Chambersburg, Pennsylvania, from 1952 to 1960. Elliott was elected to the Pennsylvania State Senate in 1956, and served until he was elected to the Eighty-sixth Congress to fill the vacancy caused by the death of Richard Simpson and served from April 26, 1960, until his death on June 19, 1960.

== Death ==
On June 19, 1960, Elliott killed himself by carbon monoxide poisoning in Horse Valley, Pennsylvania.

== See also ==
- List of members of the United States Congress who died in office (1950–1999)

U.S. House of Representatives
Preceded by Richard Simpson	Member of the U.S. House of Representatives from Pennsylvania's 18th congressional district 1960	Succeeded by Irving Whalley
Pennsylvania State Senate
Preceded by Donald McPherson, Jr.	Member of the Pennsylvania Senate for the 33rd District; 1957–1960	Succeeded by Elmer Hawbaker
