= Frank Kowalski =

American military officer and politician (1907–1974)

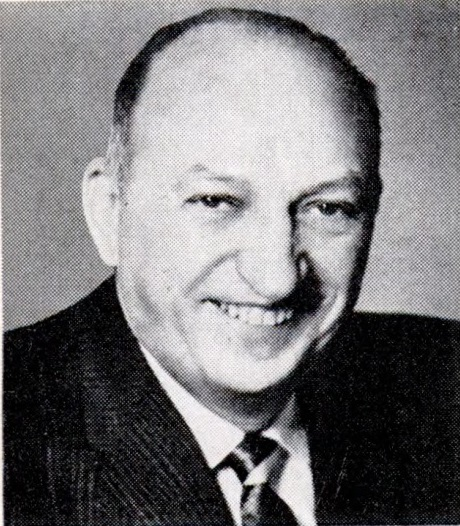
- From 1961's Pocket Congressional Directory of the Eighty-Seventh Congress

Member of the U.S. House of Representatives from Connecticut's at-large district
- In office January 3, 1959 – January 3, 1963
- Preceded by: Antoni Sadlak
- Succeeded by: Bernard F. Grabowski

Personal details
- Born: October 18, 1907 Meriden, Connecticut, US
- Died: October 11, 1974 (aged 66) Washington, D.C., US
- Resting place: Arlington National Cemetery
- Party: Democratic
- Spouse: Helene Amelia Bober
- Children: 2
- Education: United States Military Academy; Massachusetts Institute of Technology

Military service
- Allegiance: United States of America
- Branch/service: United States Army
- Years of service: 1924–1926; 1930-1958
- Rank: Colonel
- Commands: US Army Disarmament School; Military government of Kyoto; Military government of Osaka; Civil Affairs Region of Chūgoku; Fort Pickett, Virginia; US Army Command Management School
- Battles/wars: World War II; Korean War
- Awards: Legion of Merit (2); Bronze Star Medal

Frank Kowalski (October 18, 1907 – October 11, 1974) was a career officer in the United States Army, and was a veteran of World War II and the Korean War. After retiring as a colonel, Kowalski went on to serve as a United States representative from Connecticut.

Kowalski quit school in 1924, and enlisted in the Army. He received an appointment to West Point after a competitive examination, and graduated in 1930. He served initially in Infantry assignments, and then received a graduate degree at the Massachusetts Institute of Technology. He conducted experiments and research with weapons and vehicles in the late 1930s, and was responsible for training soldiers and units for deployment to the North African Theater at the start of World War II. He subsequently served at Allied Headquarters in London, where he planned and oversaw the execution of plans for de-militarizing and rebuilding Germany after the war. During the Korean War, Kowalski served in Japan, and his assignments included training and equipping a Japanese internal defense force; this force was organized as a police force rather than a military one, enabling Japan to skirt its post-World War II prohibition on training and equipping an army.

After retiring from the Army in 1958, Kowalski was a successful Democratic candidate for the United States House of Representatives from Connecticut. He served two terms, 1959 to 1963, and was an unsuccessful United States Senate candidate in 1962. After leaving Congress, Kowalski served on the Subversive Activities Control Board from 1963 to 1966.

Kowalski retired to Alexandria, Virginia. He died in Washington, D.C., in 1974, and was buried at Arlington National Cemetery.

== Early life and start of career ==
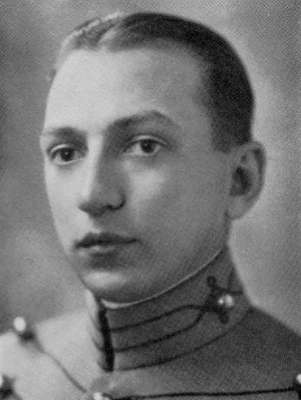
As a West Point cadet

Kowalski was born in Meriden, Connecticut, on October 18, 1907 the son of Polish immigrants Frank and Mary (Miller) Kowalczyk. His father was a foundry worker, and the family also kept a farm. His parents also raised another child, Josephine, whose parents had died. The younger Frank Kowalski assisted with farm chores while he attended the schools of Meriden, as well as the Alliance Preparatory School, a Polish-American boarding school in Erie, Pennsylvania. Withdrawn from the Alliance School after the death of his mother because his father refused to continue paying the tuition, and unhappy with a home life that included a new stepmother, Kowalski was 17 when he quit school in 1924 (while in the 11th grade) so he could enlist in the United States Army.

He earned a 1926 appointment to the United States Military Academy through a competitive examination administered to eligible enlisted soldiers, and graduated from West Point in 1930. He was commissioned as a second lieutenant of Infantry, and advanced through the grades to receive promotion to colonel in 1944, while serving in World War II.

== Start of career ==
Kowalski's initial assignment was at Fort Holabird, Maryland, a research and development center for Army vehicles, where he attended the Transportation course for officers. In 1931, he was stationed at Fort Sam Houston, Texas, where his duties included leading an Infantry company's machine gun platoon, and field testing a motorcycle platoon in Upstate New York during the winter to compare the feasibility Cavalry troops and couriers on motorized vehicles to those on horses. Ultimately, the United States Army developed the jeep rather than the motorcycle to replace the horse. He was later assigned to the Armor branch, and then was selected for post-graduate study.

Kowalski received a Master of Science degree in mechanical engineering from the Massachusetts Institute of Technology in 1937. His thesis was on the armor plating of tanks and other tracked vehicles; after completing his degree, he was assigned to the Army's Ordnance branch.

While assigned to Aberdeen Proving Ground, Maryland, Kowalski experimented with several inventions, and with prototypes of several vehicles and weapons. While conducting a live fire exercise with armor-piercing ammunition, Kowalski was struck by a ricochet; the "spent" round hit his cheek and left him with a permanent scar. During this assignment, Kowalski received several patents for military weapons and equipment, and also became a member of the newly organized American Rocket Society.

Kowalski completed the Infantry Officers Course in 1938, and then carried out an assignment aiding in the construction of what is now MacDill Air Force Base, Florida, followed by a posting to Fort Campbell, Kentucky, where he helped design and construct the post infrastructure. Returning to the Armor branch, in 1941 and 1942 Kowalski served at what is now Fort Drum, New York and at the Desert Training Center, where he aided in training tank units for combat in the North African Campaign. In 1943 and 1944, Kowalski attended the United States Army Command and General Staff College.

== World War II ==
After several years of training troops and organizing units for deployment to combat theaters, in 1944 Kowalski was posted to the European Theater. By 1944, Kowalski was serving in the Plans, Operations, and Training division (G-3) of Supreme Headquarters Allied Powers Europe (SHAPE), and was responsible for planning and overseeing execution of Civil Affairs. He landed in France on June 20, 1944, and made inspections of France, Poland, and Czechoslovakia to acquire data that would enable planning for post-war rebuilding. In 1944, he became Director of the London-based Disarmament School for the US Army, a secret program in which selected senior officers received instruction on methods to use in quickly de-militarizing Germany after the war and beginning its political, economic, and social restoration.

In late 1944, Kowalski returned to the United States for training at the Pentagon and post-graduate studies in foreign affairs at Columbia University in preparation to assume duties as a military attaché in Moscow. He became ill in 1945, and required operations that included removal of most of his stomach; Kowalski convalesced at Walter Reed Hospital for 18 months until late 1946.

== Post-World War II ==
After convalescing and completing a tour of duty as a liaison officer in the Legislative Liaison Division of the War Department from 1946 to 1947, in 1948 Kowalski was assigned to the Post-war Occupied Japan, and his assignments included Chief Military Governor of Kyoto, then Osaka, and then the Civil Affairs Region of the Chūgoku.

== Korean War ==
When the Korean War started in 1950, Kowalski was assigned as chief of staff of the Military Advisory Assistance Group in Tokyo. He helped build the Japan Police Reserve, a force of over 75,000 that was organized to defend Japan, and skirted the American-drafted Japanese Constitution prohibition against organizing and maintaining a military force. Without the Japanese defense force, Japan and its approximately 100 thousand military dependents would have been completely vulnerable to potential Communist innovation from among other threats the Soviet Union, which was 40 miles across ocean from Japan's northernmost island. In 2013, Kowalski's memoir of his time in Japan was published in English as An Inoffensive Rearmament: The Making of the Postwar Japanese Army. A Japanese language edition of the book had been published in the 1960s and was a popular addition to the post-war history of Japan in that country. The book chronicles the complexities of initiating and organizing the defense force in the only country ever devastated by nuclear war. Clever political maneuvering overcame strong pacifist opposition as well as efforts to insert the Japanese militarist World War II officer cadre into the leadership of the defense force. In the end, a truly defensive rearmament prevailed in large part due to Kowalski's capable management of these dicey issues.

== Post-Korean War ==
In 1953, Kowalski was assigned as commander of the post at Fort Pickett, Virginia. In 1954, Kowalski was assigned as the first Commandant of the Army's Command Management School at Fort Belvoir, Virginia. The Command Management School was the military's first effort to transpose the new corporate business practice of the 1950s into management of large military institutions. The school trained general officers with the business school "case study" method adopted from Columbia University's School of Business. Kowalski held this position until retiring from the Army to accept the Democratic nomination to run for Congress in Connecticut in 1958.

== Awards ==
During his military career he received the Legion of Merit with oak leaf cluster, and the Bronze Star Medal.

== Congressional career ==
Kowalski was elected to the United States House of Representatives as a Democrat in 1958, and he was reelected in 1960; he served in the 86th and 87th Congresses (January 3, 1959 – January 3, 1963). Elected to represent Connecticut in an extra, at-large seat Kowalski maintained a liberal voting record in Congress; as a member of the Armed Services Committee, he was often critical of alleged waste and mismanagement, and the misuse of military personnel for jobs including driver and waiter for senior officers.

In 1962, Kowalski was an unsuccessful candidate for the United States Senate. After leaving Congress, Kowalski served on the Subversive Activities Control Board (SACB) from 1963 to 1966. On this panel, Kowalski and fellow member Francis Cherry often worked in tandem to prevent the board from violating civil liberties in its efforts to identify pro-Communist employees of the federal government. Their efforts were successful to the point that the board was abolished in 1968.

== Death and burial ==
In retirement, Kowalski was a resident of Alexandria, Virginia. He continued to work on inventions, and the day before his death he received a patent for a dual-flush toilet system that he designed to conserve water. He died at Walter Reed Army Medical Center on October 11, 1974, after suffering a heart attack while undergoing open heart surgery. He was buried in Arlington National Cemetery.

== Family ==
In 1931, Kowalski married Helene Amelia Bober, whom he had known since childhood, and who had worked as the secretary for the mayor of New Britain, Connecticut. They were the parents of a son, Barry, and a daughter, Carol. Barry Kowalski was a United States Marine Corps veteran of the Vietnam War, and an attorney with the United States Department of Justice. In 1985, he received the department's John Marshall Award in recognition of his prosecution of the murderers of Alan Berg.

Carol was a teacher and guidance counselor in Virginia, and after her retirement she was a volunteer counselor for abused women.

== Sources ==
=== Books ===
- Kowalski, Frank (2013). An Inoffensive Rearmament: The Making of the Postwar Japanese Army. Annapolis, Maryland: Naval Institute Press. ISBN 978-1-61251-373-7.
- Current Biography Yearbook. New York, New York: H. W. Wilson Company. 1961.

=== Newspapers ===
- "Col. Kowalski, Ex-Legislator, Dies". Hartford Courant. Hartford, Connecticut. October 13, 1974 – via Newspapers.com.

=== Internet ===
- McAleer, Margaret H. (2010). "Frank Kowalski Papers: A Finding Aid to the Collection in the Library of Congress" (PDF). hdl.loc.gov/. Washington, DC: Library of Congress.

U.S. House of Representatives
| Preceded by Antoni Sadlak | Member of the U.S. House of Representatives from Connecticut's at-large congressional district 1959–1963 | Succeeded by Bernard F. Grabowski |
