= Earl Hogan =

American politician

Earl Lee Hogan
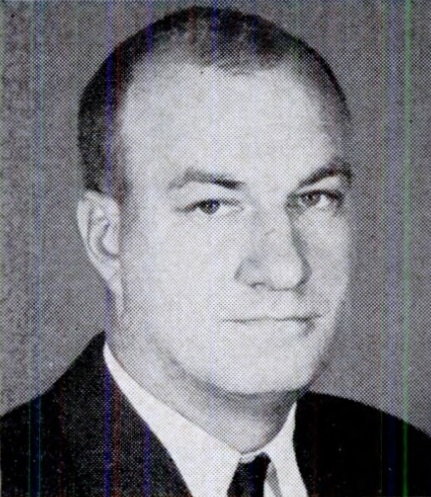
- From 1959's Pocket Congressional Directory of the 86th Congress

Member of the U.S. House of Representatives from Indiana's 9th district
- In office January 3, 1959 – January 3, 1961
- Preceded by: Earl Wilson
- Succeeded by: Earl Wilson

Personal details
- Born: March 13, 1920 Hope, Indiana, U.S.
- Died: June 3, 2007 (aged 87) Hope, Indiana, U.S.
- Party: Democratic

Military service
- Allegiance: United States
- Branch/service: United States Army Air Corps
- Years of service: 1940-1945
- Awards: Distinguished Flying Cross; Purple Heart; Air Medal with three Oak Leaf Clusters

Earl Lee Hogan (March 13, 1920 – June 3, 2007) was an American World War II veteran who served a term as a U.S. representative from Indiana from 1959 to 1961.

He was born and died in Hope, Indiana.

== Early life ==
Hogan attended public school in Burney, Indiana and later, Indiana University and the University of Kentucky.

As World War II approached Hogan enlisted in the United States Army Air Corps (1940) and remained in the service until 1945. He saw action as bombardier on the B-17 Flying Fortress, eventually receiving a Distinguished Flying Cross, a Purple Heart, and an Air Medal with three Oak Clusters.

== Postwar career ==
Returning from military service, Hogan was appointed Deputy Sheriff of Bartholomew County, Indiana (1946–50), then successfully ran for Sheriff of the same county for two terms (1950–58).

Approaching the end of his second term as Sheriff, Hogan chose to run as a Democrat for the US House of Representatives, representing the Indiana Ninth District (1958). He was successful, and served in the 86th Session (January 1959 – 1961). After losing a re-election bid in 1960, he remained in Washington D.C.

He served as assistant to the administrator of the Farmers Home Administration in 1961. He served as assistant to the administrator of the Rural Electric Administration from 1961 to 1962. He served as Midwest field representative in the Office of Rural Areas Development from 1962 to 1966. He served as Rural development specialist from 1966 to 1970, special projects representative from 1971 to 1975, and chief of business and industrial loan division from 1975 to 1980, all in the Farmers Home Administration.

In 1966 Hogan also returned to Indiana State government service, serving as the secretary of the Indiana State Rural Development Committee from 1966 to 1980. He served as chairman of the State advisory board, Indiana Green Thumb, Inc. from 1975 to 1982.

== Personal life ==
He was married to Alma Guy Benthal who died in 2000. Hogan died in 2007, aged 87. He was survived by six children, eight grandchildren, and two great-grandchildren.

U.S. House of Representatives
Preceded by Earl Wilson	Member of the U.S. House of Representatives from Indiana's 9th congressional district 1959-1961	Succeeded by Earl Wilson
