= D. Elmer Hawbaker =

American politician (1916-1994)

Member of the Pennsylvania Senate from the 33rd district
- In office 1961–1972
- Preceded by: Douglas H. Elliott
- Succeeded by: William J. Moore

Personal details
- Born: November 30, 1916 Mercersburg, Pennsylvania
- Died: November 26, 1994 (aged 77) Mercersburg, Pennsylvania

D. Elmer Hawbaker (November 30, 1916 – November 26, 1994) was an American politician. He was member of the Pennsylvania State Senate, serving from 1961 to 1972.
