= Earl Wilson (politician) =

American politician (1906–1990)

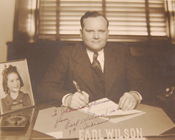

Member of the U.S. House of Representatives from Indiana's 9th district
- In office January 3, 1961 – January 3, 1965
- Preceded by: Earl Hogan
- Succeeded by: Lee Hamilton
- In office January 3, 1941 – January 3, 1959
- Preceded by: Eugene B. Crowe
- Succeeded by: Earl Hogan

Member of the Indiana Senate from the 44th district
- In office January 8, 1973 – November 3, 1976
- Preceded by: Marvin F. Klaes
- Succeeded by: James William Spurgeon

Member of the Indiana Senate from the 28th district
- In office November 6, 1968 – November 8, 1972
- Preceded by: Guy Victor Green
- Succeeded by: Martin "Chip" Koons Edwards

Personal details
- Born: April 18, 1906 Huron, Indiana
- Died: April 27, 1990 (aged 84) Bedford, Indiana
- Party: Republican
- Education: Purdue University; Coyne Electrical School; Indiana University Bloomington

Earl Wilson (April 18, 1906 – April 27, 1990) was an American educator and politician who served 11 terms as a United States representative from Indiana during the mid-20th century.

== Education ==
He attended Purdue University in Lafayette, Indiana and graduated from the Coyne Electrical School in Chicago in 1928 and from Indiana University at Bloomington in 1931.

== Political career ==
Wilson decided to enter politics and in 1940 he narrowly defeated New Deal Democrat incumbent Eugene B. Crowe 71,624–69,227 and was elected as the Republican Representative for Indiana's 9th congressional district. He served in the United States Congress until 1958, when he was defeated by Earl Hogan for reelection. In 1960, he defeated Hogan and was returned to Congress in 1961. Wilson won reelection in 1962.]. In 1964 Wilson was defeated for reelection by Democrat Lee Hamilton 74,939 – 62,780. Wilson did not vote in favor of the Civil Rights Acts of 1957 and 1964, despite voting in favor of the Civil Rights Act of 1964 in the first House vote on February 10, 1964. However, he voted present on the 24th Amendment to the U.S. Constitution.

While in Congress, Wilson was influential in moving Samuel Woodfill's body from Madison, Indiana to Arlington National Cemetery.

== Later career and death ==
After his loss to Hamilton in 1964 Wilson was elected to the Indiana State Senator serving there from 1969 to 1976. He was a resident of Bedford, Indiana, until his death on April 27, 1990.

U.S. House of Representatives
| Preceded by Eugene B. Crowe | U.S. Congressman, Indiana 9th district January 3, 1941 – January 3, 1959 | Succeeded by Earl Hogan |
| Preceded by Earl Hogan | U.S. Congressman, Indiana 9th district January 3, 1961 – January 3, 1965 | Succeeded by Lee H. Hamilton |
