= J. Irving Whalley =

American politician (1902–1980)

Irving Whalley
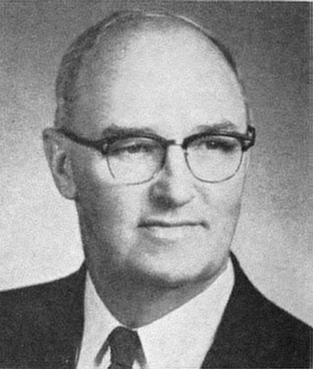

Member of the U.S. House of Representatives from Pennsylvania
- In office November 8, 1960 – January 3, 1973
- Preceded by: Douglas Elliott
- Succeeded by: John Saylor
- Constituency: 18th district (1960-1963); 12th district (1963-1973)

Member of the Pennsylvania Senate from the 36th district
- In office January 3, 1955 – August 18, 1960
- Preceded by: Fred Hare
- Succeeded by: Stanley Stroup

Member of the Pennsylvania House of Representatives from the Somerset County district
- In office January 1, 1951 – November 30, 1954

Personal details
- Born: John Irving Whalley; September 14, 1902 Barnesboro, Pennsylvania, U.S.
- Died: March 8, 1980 (aged 77) Pompano Beach, Florida, U.S.
- Resting place: Grandview Cemetery, Johnstown
- Party: Republican
- Education: Cambria-Rowe Business College

John Irving Whalley (September 14, 1902 – March 8, 1980) was an American businessman and politician who served six terms as a Republican member of the U.S. House of Representatives from Pennsylvania from 1960 to 1973.

== Early life and business activities ==
J. Irving Whalley was born in Barnesboro, Pennsylvania to Isabella (née Ashurst) and James H. Whalley, both English immigrants. He took his first job at age 10 in a Windber, Pennsylvania, grocery store. By age 14 he was working at the local Ford garage.

=== Auto dealerships ===
Twelve years later he owned the dealership, after having worked as a mechanic, salesman, bookkeeper, delivery man and driving instructor. Whalley purchased a second dealership three years later, and would open or acquire 11 more before World War II. He eventually established a chain of 13 automobile dealerships in central and western Pennsylvania.

== Public service ==
Whalley campaigned on issues related to the automotive industry. He fought against taxes that were considered unfair to new car buyers. Whalley also secured support for improvements to the Pennsylvania turnpike and campaigned for better highways everywhere.

=== Boards and commissions ===
He was a member of advisory board of Johnstown College branch of the University of Pittsburgh. He was chairman of the Somerset County Redevelopment Authority and the Windber Planning Commission. He served as a member of the Windber School Board from 1935 to 1947.

=== State legislature ===
He was a member of the Pennsylvania State House of Representatives, representing one of Somerset County's at-large seats, from 1951 to 1954. He also served in the Pennsylvania State Senate from 1955 to 1960, representing the 36th district.

He was appointed by President Richard Nixon to serve as delegate to United Nations for the 1969 session.

=== U.S. House of Representatives ===
He was elected as a Republican to the Eighty-sixth Congress, originally by special election to fill the vacancy caused by the death of United States Representative Doug Elliott. He was subsequently reelected to the five succeeding Congresses, and was a high-ranking member of the House Foreign Relations Committee. He retired in 1972.

The following year, Whalley was accused of taking staff salary kickbacks, but said the money was used for office purposes only. He pleaded guilty to one count of mail fraud and two counts of obstruction of justice, was fined $11,000 and served three years probation.

During his time in Congress, Whalley had a voting record that was for the most part a conservative one.

=== Later ===
He was inducted into the Automotive Hall of Fame in 1981. Whalley died at the age of 77 and is buried in Grandview Cemetery, Johnstown.

== See also ==
- List of American federal politicians convicted of crimes
- List of federal political scandals in the United States

Pennsylvania State Senate
| Preceded by Fred Hare | Member of the Pennsylvania Senate from the 36th district 1955–1960 | Succeeded by Stanley Stroup |
U.S. House of Representatives
| Preceded by Douglas Elliott | Member of the U.S. House of Representatives from Pennsylvania's 18th congressional district 1960–1963 | Succeeded by Robert Corbett |
| Preceded by Ivor Fenton | Member of the U.S. House of Representatives from Pennsylvania's 12th congressional district 1963–1973 | Succeeded by John Saylor |
