= List of United States representatives in the 86th Congress =

This is a complete list of United States representatives during the 86th United States Congress listed by seniority.

As an historical article, the districts and party affiliations listed reflect those during the 86th Congress (January 3, 1959 – January 3, 1961). Seats and party affiliations on similar lists for other congresses will be different for certain members.

Seniority depends on the date on which members were sworn into office. Since many members are sworn in on the same day, subsequent ranking is based on previous congressional service of the individual and then by alphabetical order by the last name of the representative.

Committee chairmanship in the House is often associated with seniority. However, party leadership is typically not associated with seniority.

Note: The "*" indicates that the representative/delegate may have served one or more non-consecutive terms while in the House of Representatives of the United States Congress.

== U.S. House seniority list ==
U.S. House seniority
Rank	Representative	Party	District	Seniority date (Previous service, if any)	No.# of term(s)	Notes
1	Sam Rayburn	D	TX-04	March 4, 1913	24th term	Dean and Speaker of the House
2	Carl Vinson	D	GA-06	November 3, 1914	24th term	
3	Daniel A. Reed	R	NY-43	March 4, 1919	21st term	Died on February 19, 1959.
4	Clarence Cannon	D	MO-09	March 4, 1923	19th term	
5	Emanuel Celler	D	NY-11	March 4, 1923	19th term	
6	John Taber	R	NY-36	March 4, 1923	19th term	
7	Joseph William Martin Jr.	R	MA-14	March 4, 1925	18th term	
8	Edith Nourse Rogers	R	MA-05	June 30, 1925	18th term	Died on September 10, 1960.
9	John William McCormack	D	MA-12	November 6, 1928	17th term	
10	Wright Patman	D	TX-01	March 4, 1929	16th term	
11	Howard W. Smith	D	VA-08	March 4, 1931	15th term	
12	Brent Spence	D	KY-05	March 4, 1931	15th term	
13	Leo E. Allen	R	IL-16	March 4, 1933	14th term	Left the House in 1961.
14	William M. Colmer	D	MS-06	March 4, 1933	14th term	
15	Francis E. Walter	D	PA-15	March 4, 1933	14th term	
16	Paul Brown	D	GA-10	July 5, 1933	14th term	Left the House in 1961.
17	Harold D. Cooley	D	NC-04	July 7, 1934	14th term	
18	Leslie C. Arends	R	IL-17	January 3, 1935	13th term	
19	Graham A. Barden	D	NC-03	January 3, 1935	13th term	Left the House in 1961.
20	Charles A. Buckley	D	NY-24	January 3, 1935	13th term	
21	Clare Hoffman	R	MI-04	January 3, 1935	13th term	
22	George H. Mahon	D	TX-19	January 3, 1935	13th term	
23	Charles A. Halleck	R	IN-02	January 29, 1935	13th term	
24	Frank W. Boykin	D	AL-01	July 30, 1935	13th term	
25	Overton Brooks	D	LA-04	January 3, 1937	12th term	
26	Eugene James Keogh	D	NY-09	January 3, 1937	12th term	
27	Michael J. Kirwan	D	OH-19	January 3, 1937	12th term	
28	Noah M. Mason	R	IL-15	January 3, 1937	12th term	
29	William R. Poage	D	TX-11	January 3, 1937	12th term	
30	Edward Herbert Rees	R	KS-04	January 3, 1937	12th term	Left the House in 1961.
31	Harry R. Sheppard	D	CA-27	January 3, 1937	12th term	
32	Albert Thomas	D	TX-08	January 3, 1937	12th term	
33	Richard M. Simpson	R	PA-18	May 11, 1937	12th term	Died on January 7, 1960.
34	George M. Grant	D	AL-02	June 14, 1938	12th term	
35	Herman Carl Andersen	R	MN-07	January 3, 1939	11th term	
36	Clarence J. Brown	R	OH-07	January 3, 1939	11th term	
37	Robert B. Chiperfield	R	IL-19	January 3, 1939	11th term	
38	Carl T. Durham	D	NC-06	January 3, 1939	11th term	Left the House in 1961.
39	Ivor D. Fenton	R	PA-12	January 3, 1939	11th term	
40	Ezekiel C. Gathings	D	AR-01	January 3, 1939	11th term	
41	Ben F. Jensen	R	IA-07	January 3, 1939	11th term	
42	Paul J. Kilday	D	TX-20	January 3, 1939	11th term	
43	John L. McMillan	D	SC-06	January 3, 1939	11th term	
44	Wilbur Mills	D	AR-02	January 3, 1939	11th term	
45	William F. Norrell	D	AR-06	January 3, 1939	11th term	
46	Clarence E. Kilburn	R	NY-33	February 13, 1940	11th term	
47	Clifford Davis	D	TN-09	February 14, 1940	11th term	
48	Frances P. Bolton	R	OH-22	February 27, 1940	11th term	
49	Herbert Covington Bonner	D	NC-01	November 5, 1940	11th term	
50	Gordon Canfield	R	NJ-08	January 3, 1941	10th term	Left the House in 1961.
51	Aime Forand	D	RI-01	January 3, 1941; Previous service, 1937–1939.	11th term*	Left the House in 1961.
52	Oren Harris	D	AR-04	January 3, 1941	10th term	
53	Felix Edward Hébert	D	LA-01	January 3, 1941	10th term	
54	L. Mendel Rivers	D	SC-01	January 3, 1941	10th term	
55	Jamie Whitten	D	MS-02	November 4, 1941	10th term	
56	Thomas J. Lane	D	MA-07	December 30, 1941	10th term	
57	Cecil R. King	D	CA-17	August 25, 1942	10th term	
58	Thomas Abernethy	D	MS-01	January 3, 1943	9th term	
59	James C. Auchincloss	R	NJ-03	January 3, 1943	9th term	
60	William L. Dawson	D	IL-01	January 3, 1943	9th term	
61	Michael A. Feighan	D	OH-20	January 3, 1943	9th term	
62	O. C. Fisher	D	TX-21	January 3, 1943	9th term	
63	Leon H. Gavin	R	PA-23	January 3, 1943	9th term	
64	Charles B. Hoeven	R	IA-08	January 3, 1943	9th term	
65	Chester E. Holifield	D	CA-19	January 3, 1943	9th term	
66	Walt Horan	R	WA-05	January 3, 1943	9th term	
67	Walter Judd	R	MN-05	January 3, 1943	9th term	
68	Ray Madden	D	IN-01	January 3, 1943	9th term	
69	Chester Earl Merrow	R	NH-01	January 3, 1943	9th term	
70	James H. Morrison	D	LA-06	January 3, 1943	9th term	
71	Tom J. Murray	D	TN-07	January 3, 1943	9th term	
72	Thomas J. O'Brien	D	IL-06	January 3, 1943; Previous service, 1933–1939.	12th term*	
73	Alvin O'Konski	R	WI-10	January 3, 1943	9th term	
74	Philip J. Philbin	D	MA-03	January 3, 1943	9th term	
75	Dean P. Taylor	R	NY-31	January 3, 1943	9th term	Left the House in 1961.
76	W. Arthur Winstead	D	MS-05	January 3, 1943	9th term	
77	George W. Andrews	D	AL-03	March 14, 1944	9th term	
78	John J. Rooney	D	NY-14	June 6, 1944	9th term	
79	John W. Byrnes	R	WI-08	January 3, 1945	8th term	
80	Frank Chelf	D	KY-04	January 3, 1945	8th term	
81	Robert J. Corbett	R	PA-29	January 3, 1945; Previous service, 1939–1941.	9th term*	
82	George Hyde Fallon	D	MD-04	January 3, 1945	8th term	
83	James G. Fulton	R	PA-27	January 3, 1945	8th term	
84	Gordon L. McDonough	R	CA-15	January 3, 1945	8th term	
85	George Paul Miller	D	CA-08	January 3, 1945	8th term	
86	Thomas E. Morgan	D	PA-26	January 3, 1945	8th term	
87	Albert Rains	D	AL-05	January 3, 1945	8th term	
88	Charles Melvin Price	D	IL-24	January 3, 1945	8th term	
89	Adam Clayton Powell Jr.	D	NY-16	January 3, 1945	8th term	
90	Robert L. F. Sikes	D	FL-03	January 3, 1945; Previous service, 1941–1944.	10th term*	
91	James William Trimble	D	AR-03	January 3, 1945	8th term	
92	John E. Fogarty	D	RI-02	February 7, 1945; Previous service, 1941–1944	10th term*	
93	J. Vaughan Gary	D	VA-03	March 6, 1945	8th term	
94	A. Walter Norblad	R	OR-01	January 18, 1946	8th term	
95	Olin E. Teague	D	TX-06	August 24, 1946	8th term	
96	Burr Harrison	D	VA-07	November 5, 1946	8th term	
97	Carl Albert	D	OK-03	January 3, 1947	7th term	
98	John B. Bennett	R	MI-12	January 3, 1947; Previous service, 1943–1945.	8th term*	
99	John Blatnik	D	MN-08	January 3, 1947	7th term	
100	Hale Boggs	D	LA-02	January 3, 1947; Previous service, 1941–1943.	8th term*	
101	Omar Burleson	D	TX-17	January 3, 1947	7th term	
102	Paul B. Dague	R	PA-09	January 3, 1947	7th term	
103	James C. Davis	D	GA-05	January 3, 1947	7th term	
104	Harold Donohue	D	MA-04	January 3, 1947	7th term	
105	Joe L. Evins	D	TN-04	January 3, 1947	7th term	
106	Katharine St. George	R	NY-28	January 3, 1947	7th term	
107	Porter Hardy Jr.	D	VA-02	January 3, 1947	7th term	
108	Donald L. Jackson	R	CA-16	January 3, 1947	7th term	Left the House in 1961.
109	Frank M. Karsten	D	MO-01	January 3, 1947	7th term	
110	Carroll D. Kearns	R	PA-24	January 3, 1947	7th term	
111	Otto Passman	D	LA-05	January 3, 1947	7th term	
112	Prince Hulon Preston Jr.	D	GA-01	January 3, 1947	7th term	Left the House in 1961.
113	R. Walter Riehlman	R	NY-35	January 3, 1947	7th term	
114	Wint Smith	R	KS-06	January 3, 1947	7th term	Left the House in 1961.
115	Thor C. Tollefson	R	WA-06	January 3, 1947	7th term	
116	John Bell Williams	D	MS-04	January 3, 1947	7th term	
117	James E. Van Zandt	R	PA-20	January 3, 1947; Previous service, 1939–1943.	10th term*	
118	Robert E. Jones Jr.	D	AL-08	January 28, 1947	7th term	
119	Russell V. Mack	R	WA-03	July 7, 1947	7th term	Died on March 28, 1960.
120	Edward Garmatz	D	MD-03	July 15, 1947	7th term	
121	Clark W. Thompson	D	TX-09	August 23, 1947; Previous service, 1933–1935.	8th term*	
122	William Moore McCulloch	R	OH-04	November 4, 1947	7th term	
123	Abraham J. Multer	D	NY-13	November 4, 1947	7th term	
124	Watkins Moorman Abbitt	D	VA-04	February 17, 1948	7th term	
125	Paul C. Jones	D	MO-10	November 2, 1948	7th term	
126	Hugh Joseph Addonizio	D	NJ-11	January 3, 1949	6th term	
127	Wayne N. Aspinall	D	CO-04	January 3, 1949	6th term	
128	Cleveland M. Bailey	D	WV-03	January 3, 1949; Previous service, 1945–1947.	7th term*	
129	William A. Barrett	D	PA-01	January 3, 1949; Previous service, 1945–1947.	7th term*	
130	Charles Edward Bennett	D	FL-02	January 3, 1949	6th term	
131	Richard Walker Bolling	D	MO-05	January 3, 1949	6th term	
132	A. S. J. Carnahan	D	MO-08	January 3, 1949; Previous service, 1945–1947.	7th term*	Left the House in 1961.
133	James J. Delaney	D	NY-07	January 3, 1949; Previous service, 1945–1947.	7th term*	
134	Isidore Dollinger	D	NY-23	January 3, 1949	6th term	Resigned on December 31, 1959.
135	Clyde Doyle	D	CA-23	January 3, 1949; Previous service, 1945–1947.	7th term*	
136	Carl Elliott	D	AL-07	January 3, 1949	6th term	
137	Gerald Ford	R	MI-05	January 3, 1949	6th term	
138	James B. Frazier Jr.	D	TN-03	January 3, 1949	6th term	
139	William J. Green Jr.	D	PA-05	January 3, 1949; Previous service, 1945–1947.	7th term*	
140	H. R. Gross	R	IA-03	January 3, 1949	6th term	
141	Wayne Hays	D	OH-18	January 3, 1949	6th term	
142	Albert S. Herlong Jr.	D	FL-05	January 3, 1949	6th term	
143	Peter F. Mack Jr.	D	IL-21	January 3, 1949	6th term	
144	Fred Marshall	D	MN-06	January 3, 1949	6th term	
145	Morgan M. Moulder	D	MO-11	January 3, 1949	6th term	
146	Carl D. Perkins	D	KY-07	January 3, 1949	6th term	
147	James G. Polk	D	OH-06	January 3, 1949; Previous service, 1931–1941.	11th term*	Died on April 28, 1959.
148	Louis C. Rabaut	D	MI-14	January 3, 1949; Previous service, 1935–1947.	12th term*	
149	George M. Rhodes	D	PA-14	January 3, 1949	6th term	
150	Peter W. Rodino	D	NJ-10	January 3, 1949	6th term	
151	Harley Orrin Staggers	D	WV-02	January 3, 1949	6th term	
152	Tom Steed	D	OK-04	January 3, 1949	6th term	
153	Homer Thornberry	D	TX-10	January 3, 1949	6th term	
154	Roy Wier	D	MN-03	January 3, 1949	6th term	Left the House in 1961.
155	Edwin E. Willis	D	LA-03	January 3, 1949	6th term	
156	Gardner R. Withrow	R	WI-03	January 3, 1949; Previous service, 1931–1939.	10th term*	Left the House in 1961.
157	Sidney R. Yates	D	IL-09	January 3, 1949	6th term	
158	Clement J. Zablocki	D	WI-04	January 3, 1949	6th term	
159	John P. Saylor	R	PA-22	September 13, 1949	6th term	
160	Edna F. Kelly	D	NY-10	November 8, 1949	6th term	
161	John F. Shelley	D	CA-05	November 8, 1949	6th term	
162	William B. Widnall	R	NJ-07	February 6, 1950	6th term	
163	William H. Bates	R	MA-06	February 14, 1950	6th term	
164	E. Ross Adair	R	IN-04	January 3, 1951	5th term	
165	William Hanes Ayres	R	OH-14	January 3, 1951	5th term	
166	Howard Baker Sr.	R	TN-02	January 3, 1951	5th term	
167	Page Belcher	R	OK-01	January 3, 1951	5th term	
168	Ellis Yarnal Berry	R	SD-02	January 3, 1951	5th term	
169	Jackson Edward Betts	R	OH-08	January 3, 1951	5th term	
170	Frank T. Bow	R	OH-16	January 3, 1951	5th term	
171	William G. Bray	R	IN-07	January 3, 1951	5th term	
172	Hamer H. Budge	R	ID-02	January 3, 1951	5th term	Left the House in 1961.
173	Alvin Bush	R	PA-17	January 3, 1951	5th term	Died on November 5, 1959.
174	John Chenoweth	R	CO-03	January 3, 1951; Previous service, 1941–1949.	9th term*	
175	Marguerite S. Church	R	IL-13	January 3, 1951	5th term	
176	Thomas B. Curtis	R	MO-02	January 3, 1951	5th term	
177	William Jennings Bryan Dorn	D	SC-03	January 3, 1951; Previous service, 1947–1949.	6th term*	
178	Tic Forrester	D	GA-03	January 3, 1951	5th term	
179	William E. Hess	R	OH-02	January 3, 1951; Previous service, 1929–1937 and 1939–1949.	14th term**	Left the House in 1961.
180	John Jarman	D	OK-05	January 3, 1951	5th term	
181	John C. Kluczynski	D	IL-05	January 3, 1951	5th term	
182	John Lesinski Jr.	D	MI-16	January 3, 1951	5th term	
183	Thaddeus M. Machrowicz	D	MI-01	January 3, 1951	5th term	
184	George Meader	R	MI-02	January 3, 1951	5th term	
185	William E. Miller	R	NY-40	January 3, 1951	5th term	
186	Walter M. Mumma	R	PA-16	January 3, 1951	5th term	
187	Harold C. Ostertag	R	NY-39	January 3, 1951	5th term	
188	B. Carroll Reece	R	TN-01	January 3, 1951; Previous service, 1921–1931 and 1933–1947.	17th term**	
189	John J. Riley	D	SC-02	January 3, 1951; Previous service, 1945–1949.	7th term*	
190	Kenneth A. Roberts	D	AL-04	January 3, 1951	5th term	
191	Byron G. Rogers	D	CO-01	January 3, 1951	5th term	
192	Walter E. Rogers	D	TX-18	January 3, 1951	5th term	
193	Frank E. Smith	D	MS-03	January 3, 1951	5th term	
194	William L. Springer	R	IL-22	January 3, 1951	5th term	
195	J. Ernest Wharton	R	NY-29	January 3, 1951	5th term	
196	William Van Pelt	R	WI-06	January 3, 1951	5th term	
197	John C. Watts	D	KY-06	April 4, 1951	5th term	
198	Elizabeth Kee	D	WV-05	July 17, 1951	5th term	
199	Frank N. Ikard	D	TX-13	September 8, 1951	5th term	
200	Clifford McIntire	R	ME-03	October 22, 1951	5th term	
201	Frank C. Osmers Jr.	R	NJ-09	November 6, 1951; Previous service, 1939–1943.	7th term*	
202	Paul F. Schenck	R	OH-03	November 6, 1951	5th term	
203	Leo W. O'Brien	D	NY-30	April 1, 1952	5th term	
204	John Dowdy	D	TX-07	September 23, 1952	5th term	
205	Hugh Quincy Alexander	D	NC-09	January 3, 1953	4th term	
206	Frank J. Becker	R	NY-03	January 3, 1953	4th term	
207	Alvin Morell Bentley	R	MI-08	January 3, 1953	4th term	Left the House in 1961.
208	Edward Boland	D	MA-02	January 3, 1953	4th term	
209	Albert H. Bosch	R	NY-05	January 3, 1953	4th term	Resigned on December 31, 1960.
210	Jack Brooks	D	TX-02	January 3, 1953	4th term	
211	Joel Broyhill	R	VA-10	January 3, 1953	4th term	
212	James A. Byrne	D	PA-03	January 3, 1953	4th term	
213	Elford Albin Cederberg	R	MI-10	January 3, 1953	4th term	
214	Laurence Curtis	R	MA-10	January 3, 1953	4th term	
215	Steven Derounian	R	NY-02	January 3, 1953	4th term	
216	Francis E. Dorn	R	NY-12	January 3, 1953	4th term	Left the House in 1961.
217	Ed Edmondson	D	OK-02	January 3, 1953	4th term	
218	Paul A. Fino	R	NY-25	January 3, 1953	4th term	
219	Lawrence H. Fountain	D	NC-02	January 3, 1953	4th term	
220	Peter Frelinghuysen Jr.	R	NJ-05	January 3, 1953	4th term	
221	Samuel Friedel	D	MD-07	January 3, 1953	4th term	
222	Charles S. Gubser	R	CA-10	January 3, 1953	4th term	
223	Harlan Hagen	D	CA-14	January 3, 1953	4th term	
224	James A. Haley	D	FL-07	January 3, 1953	4th term	
225	Edgar W. Hiestand	R	CA-21	January 3, 1953	4th term	
226	Joseph F. Holt	R	CA-22	January 3, 1953	4th term	Left the House in 1961.
227	Lester Holtzman	D	NY-06	January 3, 1953	4th term	
228	Craig Hosmer	R	CA-18	January 3, 1953	4th term	
229	Charles R. Jonas	R	NC-10	January 3, 1953	4th term	
230	Victor A. Knox	R	MI-11	January 3, 1953	4th term	
231	Melvin Laird	R	WI-07	January 3, 1953	4th term	
232	Phillip M. Landrum	D	GA-09	January 3, 1953	4th term	
233	Donald H. Magnuson	D	WA-07	January 3, 1953	4th term	
234	William S. Mailliard	R	CA-04	January 3, 1953	4th term	
235	Donald Ray Matthews	D	FL-08	January 3, 1953	4th term	
236	Lee Metcalf	D	MT-01	January 3, 1953	4th term	Left the House in 1961.
237	John E. Moss	D	CA-03	January 3, 1953	4th term	
238	Barratt O'Hara	D	IL-02	January 3, 1953; Previous service, 1949–1951.	5th term*	
239	Tip O'Neill	D	MA-11	January 3, 1953	4th term	
240	Thomas Pelly	R	WA-01	January 3, 1953	4th term	
241	Gracie Pfost	D	ID-01	January 3, 1953	4th term	
242	John R. Pillion	R	NY-42	January 3, 1953	4th term	
243	Richard Harding Poff	R	VA-06	January 3, 1953	4th term	
244	John H. Ray	R	NY-15	January 3, 1953	4th term	
245	John J. Rhodes	R	AZ-01	January 3, 1953	4th term	
246	Gordon H. Scherer	R	OH-01	January 3, 1953	4th term	
247	Armistead Selden	D	AL-06	January 3, 1953	4th term	
248	Leonor Sullivan	D	MO-03	January 3, 1953	4th term	
249	T. Ashton Thompson	D	LA-07	January 3, 1953	4th term	
250	James B. Utt	R	CA-28	January 3, 1953	4th term	
251	J. Arthur Younger	R	CA-09	January 3, 1953	4th term	
252	Stuyvesant Wainwright	R	NY-01	January 3, 1953	4th term	Left the House in 1961.
253	Jack Westland	R	WA-02	January 3, 1953	4th term	
254	Bob Wilson	R	CA-30	January 3, 1953	4th term	
255	J. L. Pilcher	D	GA-02	February 4, 1953	4th term	
256	William M. Tuck	D	VA-05	April 14, 1953	4th term	
257	Robert T. Ashmore	D	SC-04	June 2, 1953	4th term	
258	William Natcher	D	KY-02	August 1, 1953	4th term	
259	Lester Johnson	D	WI-09	October 13, 1953	4th term	
260	Glenard P. Lipscomb	R	CA-24	November 10, 1953	4th term	
261	John James Flynt Jr.	D	GA-04	November 2, 1954	4th term	
262	Bruce Alger	R	TX-05	January 3, 1955	3rd term	
263	Victor Anfuso	D	NY-08	January 3, 1955; Previous service, 1951–1953.	4th term*	
264	Thomas W. L. Ashley	D	OH-09	January 3, 1955	3rd term	
265	William H. Avery	R	KS-01	January 3, 1955	3rd term	
266	John F. Baldwin Jr.	R	CA-06	January 3, 1955	3rd term	
267	Perkins Bass	R	NH-02	January 3, 1955	3rd term	
268	Ross Bass	D	TN-06	January 3, 1955	3rd term	
269	Albert David Baumhart Jr.	R	OH-13	January 3, 1955; Previous service, 1941–1942.	4th term*	Left the House in 1961.
270	Iris Faircloth Blitch	D	GA-08	January 3, 1955	3rd term	
271	Charles A. Boyle	D	IL-12	January 3, 1955	3rd term	Died on November 4, 1959.
272	George H. Christopher	D	MO-04	January 3, 1955; Previous service, 1949–1951.	4th term*	Died on January 23, 1959.
273	Frank M. Clark	D	PA-25	January 3, 1955	3rd term	
274	William C. Cramer	R	FL-01	January 3, 1955	3rd term	
275	Winfield K. Denton	D	IN-08	January 3, 1955; Previous service, 1949–1953.	5th term*	
276	Charles Diggs	D	MI-13	January 3, 1955	3rd term	
277	Henry Aldous Dixon	R	UT-01	January 3, 1955	3rd term	Left the House in 1961.
278	Dante Fascell	D	FL-04	January 3, 1955	3rd term	
279	Daniel J. Flood	D	PA-11	January 3, 1955; Previous service, 1945–1947 and 1949–1953.	6th term**	
280	Kenneth J. Gray	D	IL-25	January 3, 1955	3rd term	
281	Edith Green	D	OR-03	January 3, 1955	3rd term	
282	Martha Griffiths	D	MI-17	January 3, 1955	3rd term	
283	John E. Henderson	R	OH-15	January 3, 1955	3rd term	Left the House in 1961.
284	George Huddleston Jr.	D	AL-09	January 3, 1955	3rd term	
285	William Raleigh Hull Jr.	D	MO-06	January 3, 1955	3rd term	
286	W. Pat Jennings	D	VA-09	January 3, 1955	3rd term	
287	August E. Johansen	R	MI-03	January 3, 1955	3rd term	
288	Joe M. Kilgore	D	TX-15	January 3, 1955	3rd term	
289	Richard Lankford	D	MD-05	January 3, 1955	3rd term	
290	Torbert Macdonald	D	MA-08	January 3, 1955	3rd term	
291	William Edwin Minshall Jr.	R	OH-23	January 3, 1955	3rd term	
292	Henry S. Reuss	D	WI-05	January 3, 1955	3rd term	
293	James Roosevelt	D	CA-26	January 3, 1955	3rd term	
294	J. T. Rutherford	D	TX-16	January 3, 1955	3rd term	
295	Fred Schwengel	R	IA-01	January 3, 1955	3rd term	
296	Eugene Siler	R	KY-08	January 3, 1955	3rd term	
297	Bernice F. Sisk	D	CA-12	January 3, 1955	3rd term	
298	Charles M. Teague	R	CA-13	January 3, 1955	3rd term	
299	Edwin Keith Thomson	R	WY	January 3, 1955	3rd term	Died on December 9, 1960.
300	Frank Thompson	D	NJ-04	January 3, 1955	3rd term	
301	Stewart Udall	D	AZ-02	January 3, 1955	3rd term	
302	Charles Vanik	D	OH-21	January 3, 1955	3rd term	
303	Phillip Hart Weaver	R	NE-01	January 3, 1955	3rd term	
304	Jim Wright	D	TX-12	January 3, 1955	3rd term	
305	Herbert Zelenko	D	NY-21	January 3, 1955	3rd term	
306	Paul Rogers	D	FL-06	January 11, 1955	3rd term	
307	John Dingell	D	MI-15	December 13, 1955	3rd term	
308	Elmer J. Holland	D	PA-30	January 24, 1956; Previous service, 1942–1943.	4th term*	
309	James C. Healey	D	NY-22	February 7, 1956	3rd term	
310	Kathryn E. Granahan	D	PA-02	November 6, 1956	3rd term	
311	LeRoy H. Anderson	D	MT-02	January 3, 1957	3rd term	Left the House in 1961.
312	Walter S. Baring Jr.	D	NV	January 3, 1957; Previous service, 1949–1953.	4th term*	
313	Lindley Beckworth	D	TX-03	January 3, 1957; Previous service, 1939–1953.	9th term*	
314	James Floyd Breeding	D	KS-05	January 3, 1957	2nd term	
315	William Broomfield	R	MI-18	January 3, 1957	2nd term	
316	Charles Harrison Brown	D	MO-07	January 3, 1957	2nd term	Left the House in 1961.
317	Charles E. Chamberlain	R	MI-06	January 3, 1957	2nd term	
318	Merwin Coad	D	IA-06	January 3, 1957	2nd term	
319	Frank M. Coffin	D	ME-02	January 3, 1957	2nd term	Left the House in 1961.
320	Harold R. Collier	R	IL-10	January 3, 1957	2nd term	
321	Glenn Cunningham	R	NE-02	January 3, 1957	2nd term	
322	Willard S. Curtin	R	PA-08	January 3, 1957	2nd term	
323	Edwin B. Dooley	R	NY-26	January 3, 1957	2nd term	
324	Florence P. Dwyer	R	NJ-06	January 3, 1957	2nd term	
325	Leonard Farbstein	D	NY-19	January 3, 1957	2nd term	
326	Robert P. Griffin	R	MI-09	January 3, 1957	2nd term	
327	Robert W. Hemphill	D	SC-05	January 3, 1957	2nd term	
328	Alvin Paul Kitchin	D	NC-08	January 3, 1957	2nd term	
329	Alton Lennon	D	NC-07	January 3, 1957	2nd term	
330	Joseph Carlton Loser	D	TN-05	January 3, 1957	2nd term	
331	John J. McFall	D	CA-11	January 3, 1957	2nd term	
332	George McGovern	D	SD-01	January 3, 1957	2nd term	Left the House in 1961.
333	Robert Michel	R	IL-18	January 3, 1957	2nd term	
334	Arch A. Moore Jr.	R	WV-01	January 3, 1957	2nd term	
335	Toby Morris	D	OK-06	January 3, 1957; Previous service, 1947–1953.	5th term*	Left the House in 1961.
336	Charles O. Porter	D	OR-04	January 3, 1957	2nd term	Left the House in 1961.
337	Alfred E. Santangelo	D	NY-18	January 3, 1957	2nd term	
338	Dalip Singh Saund	D	CA-29	January 3, 1957	2nd term	
339	Ralph James Scott	D	NC-05	January 3, 1957	2nd term	
340	H. Allen Smith	R	CA-20	January 3, 1957	2nd term	
341	Ludwig Teller	D	NY-20	January 3, 1957	2nd term	Left the House in 1961.
342	Basil Lee Whitener	D	NC-11	January 3, 1957	2nd term	
343	Al Ullman	D	OR-02	January 3, 1957	2nd term	
344	John Andrew Young	D	TX-14	January 3, 1957	2nd term	
345	Joseph Montoya	D	NM	April 9, 1957	2nd term	
346	Milton W. Glenn	R	NJ-02	November 5, 1957	2nd term	
347	John A. Lafore Jr.	R	PA-13	November 5, 1957	2nd term	Left the House in 1961.
348	Roland V. Libonati	D	IL-07	December 31, 1957	2nd term	
349	Harlan Erwin Mitchell	D	GA-07	January 8, 1958	2nd term	Left the House in 1961.
350	Howard W. Robison	R	NY-37	January 14, 1958	2nd term	
351	John Herman Dent	D	PA-21	January 21, 1958	2nd term	
352	Fats Everett	D	TN-08	February 1, 1958	2nd term	
353	Al Quie	R	MN-01	February 18, 1958	2nd term	
354	Robert N.C. Nix Sr.	D	PA-04	May 20, 1958	2nd term	
355	Dale Alford	D	AR-05	January 3, 1959	1st term	
356	Joseph W. Barr	D	IN-11	January 3, 1959	1st term	Left the House in 1961.
357	Robert R. Barry	R	NY-27	January 3, 1959	1st term	
358	Chester Bowles	D	CT-02	January 3, 1959	1st term	Left the House in 1961.
359	John Brademas	D	IN-03	January 3, 1959	1st term	
360	Daniel Brewster	D	MD-02	January 3, 1959	1st term	
361	Lawrence Brock	D	NE-03	January 3, 1959	1st term	Left the House in 1961.
362	Quentin N. Burdick	D	ND	January 3, 1959	1st term	Resigned on August 8, 1960.
363	Frank W. Burke	D	KY-03	January 3, 1959	1st term	
364	James A. Burke	D	MA-13	January 3, 1959	1st term	
365	William T. Cahill	R	NJ-01	January 3, 1959	1st term	
366	Steven V. Carter	D	IA-04	January 3, 1959	1st term	Died on November 4, 1959.
367	Robert R. Casey	D	TX-22	January 3, 1959	1st term	
368	Jeffery Cohelan	D	CA-07	January 3, 1959	1st term	
369	Silvio O. Conte	R	MA-01	January 3, 1959	1st term	
370	Robert E. Cook	D	OH-11	January 3, 1959	1st term	
371	Emilio Q. Daddario	D	CT-01	January 3, 1959	1st term	
372	Dominick V. Daniels	D	NJ-14	January 3, 1959	1st term	
373	Ed Derwinski	R	IL-04	January 3, 1959	1st term	
374	Samuel L. Devine	R	OH-12	January 3, 1959	1st term	
375	Thomas N. Downing	D	VA-01	January 3, 1959	1st term	
376	Thaddeus J. Dulski	D	NY-41	January 3, 1959	1st term	
377	Gerald T. Flynn	D	WI-01	January 3, 1959	1st term	Left the House in 1961.
378	John R. Foley	D	MD-06	January 3, 1959	1st term	Left the House in 1961.
379	Cornelius Edward Gallagher	D	NJ-13	January 3, 1959	1st term	
380	Newell A. George	D	KS-02	January 3, 1959	1st term	Left the House in 1961.
381	Robert Giaimo	D	CT-03	January 3, 1959	1st term	
382	David McKee Hall	D	NC-12	January 3, 1959	1st term	Died on January 29, 1960.
383	Seymour Halpern	R	NY-04	January 3, 1959	1st term	
384	Denver David Hargis	D	KS-03	January 3, 1959	1st term	Left the House in 1961.
385	Randall S. Harmon	D	IN-10	January 3, 1959	1st term	Left the House in 1961.
386	Ken Hechler	D	WV-04	January 3, 1959	1st term	
387	Elmer J. Hoffman	R	IL-14	January 3, 1959	1st term	
388	Earl Hogan	D	IN-09	January 3, 1959	1st term	Left the House in 1961.
389	Donald J. Irwin	D	CT-04	January 3, 1959	1st term	Left the House in 1961.
390	Byron L. Johnson	D	CO-02	January 3, 1959	1st term	Left the House in 1961.
391	Harold T. Johnson	D	CA-02	January 3, 1959	1st term	
392	Thomas Francis Johnson	D	MD-01	January 3, 1959	1st term	
393	Joseph Karth	D	MN-04	January 3, 1959	1st term	
394	George A. Kasem	D	CA-25	January 3, 1959	1st term	Left the House in 1961.
395	Robert Kastenmeier	D	WI-02	January 3, 1959	1st term	
396	Hastings Keith	R	MA-09	January 3, 1959	1st term	
397	David S. King	D	UT-02	January 3, 1959	1st term	
398	Frank Kowalski	D	CT	January 3, 1959	1st term	
399	Odin Langen	R	MN-09	January 3, 1959	1st term	
400	Del Latta	R	OH-05	January 3, 1959	1st term	
401	Robert W. Levering	D	OH-17	January 3, 1959	1st term	Left the House in 1961.
402	John Lindsay	R	NY-17	January 3, 1959	1st term	
403	Catherine Dean May	R	WA-04	January 3, 1959	1st term	
404	Harris B. McDowell Jr.	D	DE	January 3, 1959; Previous service, 1955–1957.	2nd term*	
405	Donald McGinley	D	NE-04	January 3, 1959	1st term	Left the House in 1961.
406	Harold B. McSween	D	LA-08	January 3, 1959	1st term	
407	William H. Meyer	D	VT	January 3, 1959	1st term	Left the House in 1961.
408	Clement Woodnutt Miller	D	CA-01	January 3, 1959	1st term	
409	William H. Milliken Jr.	R	PA-07	January 3, 1959	1st term	
410	Walter H. Moeller	D	OH-10	January 3, 1959	1st term	
411	John S. Monagan	D	CT-05	January 3, 1959	1st term	
412	William S. Moorhead	D	PA-28	January 3, 1959	1st term	
413	Thomas G. Morris	D	NM	January 3, 1959	1st term	
414	William T. Murphy	D	IL-03	January 3, 1959	1st term	
415	Ancher Nelsen	R	MN-02	January 3, 1959	1st term	
416	James C. Oliver	D	ME-01	January 3, 1959; Previous service, 1937–1943.	4th term*	Left the House in 1961.
417	James G. O'Hara	D	MI-07	January 3, 1959	1st term	
418	Alexander Pirnie	R	NY-34	January 3, 1959	1st term	
419	Stanley A. Prokop	D	PA-10	January 3, 1959	1st term	Left the House in 1961.
420	Roman C. Pucinski	D	IL-11	January 3, 1959	1st term	
421	James M. Quigley	D	PA-19	January 3, 1959; Previous service, 1955–1957.	2nd term*	Left the House in 1961.
422	Ralph Julian Rivers	D	AK	January 3, 1959	1st term	
423	Dan Rostenkowski	D	IL-08	January 3, 1959	1st term	
424	J. Edward Roush	D	IN-05	January 3, 1959	1st term	
425	George E. Shipley	D	IL-23	January 3, 1959	1st term	
426	Don L. Short	R	ND	January 3, 1959	1st term	
427	Edna O. Simpson	R	IL-20	January 3, 1959	1st term	Left the House in 1961.
428	John M. Slack Jr.	D	WV-06	January 3, 1959	1st term	
429	Neal Smith	D	IA-05	January 3, 1959	1st term	
430	Samuel S. Stratton	D	NY-32	January 3, 1959	1st term	
431	Frank Stubblefield	D	KY-01	January 3, 1959	1st term	
432	Herman Toll	D	PA-06	January 3, 1959	1st term	
433	George M. Wallhauser	R	NJ-12	January 3, 1959	1st term	
434	Fred Wampler	D	IN-06	January 3, 1959	1st term	Left the House in 1961.
435	Jessica M. Weis	R	NY-38	January 3, 1959	1st term	
436	Leonard G. Wolf	D	IA-02	January 3, 1959	1st term	Left the House in 1961.
	William J. Randall	D	MO-04	March 3, 1959	1st term	
	Charles Goodell	R	NY-43	May 26, 1959	1st term	
	Daniel Inouye	D	HI	August 21, 1959	1st term	
	John Henry Kyl	R	IA-04	December 15, 1959	1st term	
	Jacob H. Gilbert	D	NY-23	March 8, 1960	1st term	
	Douglas Hemphill Elliott	R	PA-18	April 26, 1960	1st term	Died on June 19, 1960.
	Herman T. Schneebeli	R	PA-17	April 26, 1960	1st term	
	Roy A. Taylor	D	NC-12	June 25, 1960	1st term	
	Julia Butler Hansen	D	WA-03	November 8, 1960	1st term	
	Ward Miller	R	OH-06	November 8, 1960	1st term	Left the House in 1961.
	J. Irving Whalley	R	PA-18	November 8, 1960	1st term	

== Delegates ==
Rank	Delegate	Party	District	Seniority date (Previous service, if any)	No.# of term(s)	Notes
1	Antonio Fernós-Isern	D	PR	September 11, 1946	8th term	
2	John A. Burns	D	HI	January 3, 1957	2nd term	

== See also ==
- 86th United States Congress
- List of United States congressional districts
- List of United States senators in the 86th Congress
