= David Jenkins Ward =

American politician (1871–1961)

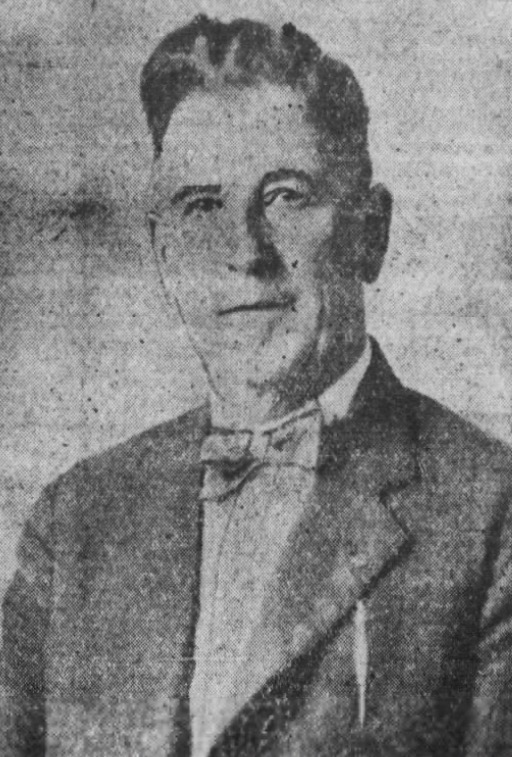

Member of the U.S. House of Representatives from Maryland's 1st district
- In office June 8, 1939 – January 3, 1945
- Preceded by: Thomas Alan Goldsborough
- Succeeded by: Dudley Roe

Member of the Maryland Senate
- In office 1926–1934
- In office 1938–1939
- Preceded by: O. Straughn Lloyd

Member of the Maryland House of Representatives from the Wicomico County district
- In office 1915–1917

Personal details
- Born: September 17, 1871 Salisbury, Maryland, US
- Died: February 18, 1961 (aged 89) Salisbury, Maryland, US
- Party: Democratic
- Occupation: Politician

David Jenkins Ward (September 17, 1871 – February 18, 1961) was an American politician and businessman. A Democrat, he was a member of the United States House of Representatives from Maryland.

== Biography ==
Ward was born on September 17, 1871, in Salisbury, Maryland. Educated at public schools, he worked as a farmer, lumberjack, merchant, and real estate agent. He was the founder of a fertilizer company. He founded a board to regulate liquor in Wicomico County.

Ward was a Democrat. From 1915 to 1917, he represented Wicomico County in the Maryland House of Delegates. He headed the Maryland Democratic Party from 1918 to 1926. From 1926 to 1934, and again from 1938 to 1939, he was a member of the Maryland Senate. As Senator, he helped establish the Deer's Head Center hospital.

Following the resignation of Thomas Alan Goldsborough, Ward was elected to the United States House of Representatives. He served from June 8, 1939, to January 3, 1945, representing Maryland's 1st district. He was not nominated for the following election. Ideologically, he leaned liberal.

Ward was married to Edith Perdue and had five children. On August 30, 1917, he got into a traffic collision, killing his wife and injuring he and four of his children. He was not expected to live, but went on to make a full recovery.

Ward died on February 18, 1961, aged 89, in Salisbury, from a heart attack, and was buried at Parsons Cemetery, in Salisbury. His pallbearers included Thomas Francis Johnson, Lansdale Ghiselin Sasscer, and J. Millard Tawes.

U.S. House of Representatives
Preceded by Thomas Alan Goldsborough	Member of the U.S. House of Representatives from Maryland's 1st congressional district 1939–1945	Succeeded by Dudley Roe
