= Thomas Goldsborough =

Thomas Goldsborough may refer to:

- Thomas Alan Goldsborough, US judge
- Thomas Goldsborough (politician) for Cambridge (UK Parliament constituency)
