= Dudley Roe =

American politician (1881–1970)

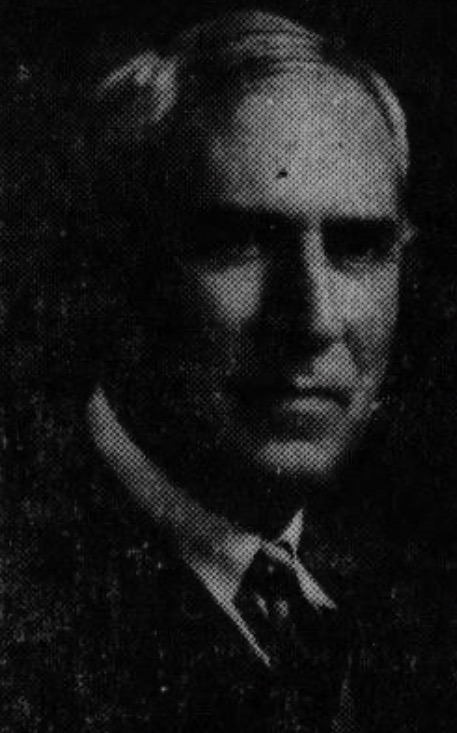

Member of the U.S. House of Representatives from Maryland's 1st district
- In office January 3, 1945 – January 3, 1947
- Preceded by: David Jenkins Ward
- Succeeded by: Edward Tylor Miller

Member of the Maryland Senate
- In office 1923–1935
- In office 1939–1943

Member of the Maryland House of Representatives
- In office 1907–1909

Personal details
- Born: Dudley George Roe; March 23, 1881 Sudlersville, Maryland, US
- Died: January 4, 1970 (aged 88) Chestertown, Maryland, US
- Party: Democratic
- Relations: Matthias George (great-grandfather)
- Occupation: Politician

Dudley George Roe (March 23, 1881 – January 4, 1970) was an American politician. A Democrat, he was a member of the United States House of Representatives from Maryland.

== Early life and education ==
Roe was born on March 23, 1881, at "Wildwood", his father's property in Sudlersville, Maryland, the son of William Dudley Roe and Martha Neal (née George) Roe. Through his mother, his great-grandfather was politician Matthias George.

Roe was educated at local public schools and by private tutors. He studied at Washington College, earning a Bachelor of Arts and a Master of Arts from there, in 1901 and 1904, respectively. In fall 1903, he enrolled at the University of Maryland Francis King Carey School of Law, graduating in 1905 with an Bachelor of Laws. In 1905, he was admitted to the bar, after which he began practicing law in Baltimore.

== Politics and later career ==
Roe was a Democrat. From 1907 to 1909, he was a member of the Maryland House of Delegates. He was a delegate to the 1928 Democratic National Convention. He was a member of the Maryland Senate from 1923 to 1935, and again from 1939 to 1943, serving as its Democratic majority leader from 1939 to 1943. He was a member of the United States House of Representatives, from January 3, 1945, to January 3, 1947, representing Maryland's 1st district. He lost the following election. Ideologically, he was conservative.

After serving in Congress, Roe worked as a banker, farmer, and grain salesman. He headed the Sudlersville Bank until resigning in 1967, serving as its director, then as its president. After his resignation, he became the chairman of its board of directors.

== Personal life and death ==
On April 17, 1906, Roe married Anna Jane Metcalfe. He later married Edith Welch. He had two children. He was Anglician, as well as a member of the Freemasons, specifically its Scottish Rite. He died on January 4, 1970, aged 88, in Chestertown, and was buried at the Sudlersville Cemetery.

U.S. House of Representatives
| Preceded by David Jenkins Ward | Member of the U.S. House of Representatives from Maryland's 1st congressional district 1945–1947 | Succeeded by Edward Tylor Miller |
