= 1962 United States Senate election in Maryland =

- November 6, 1962
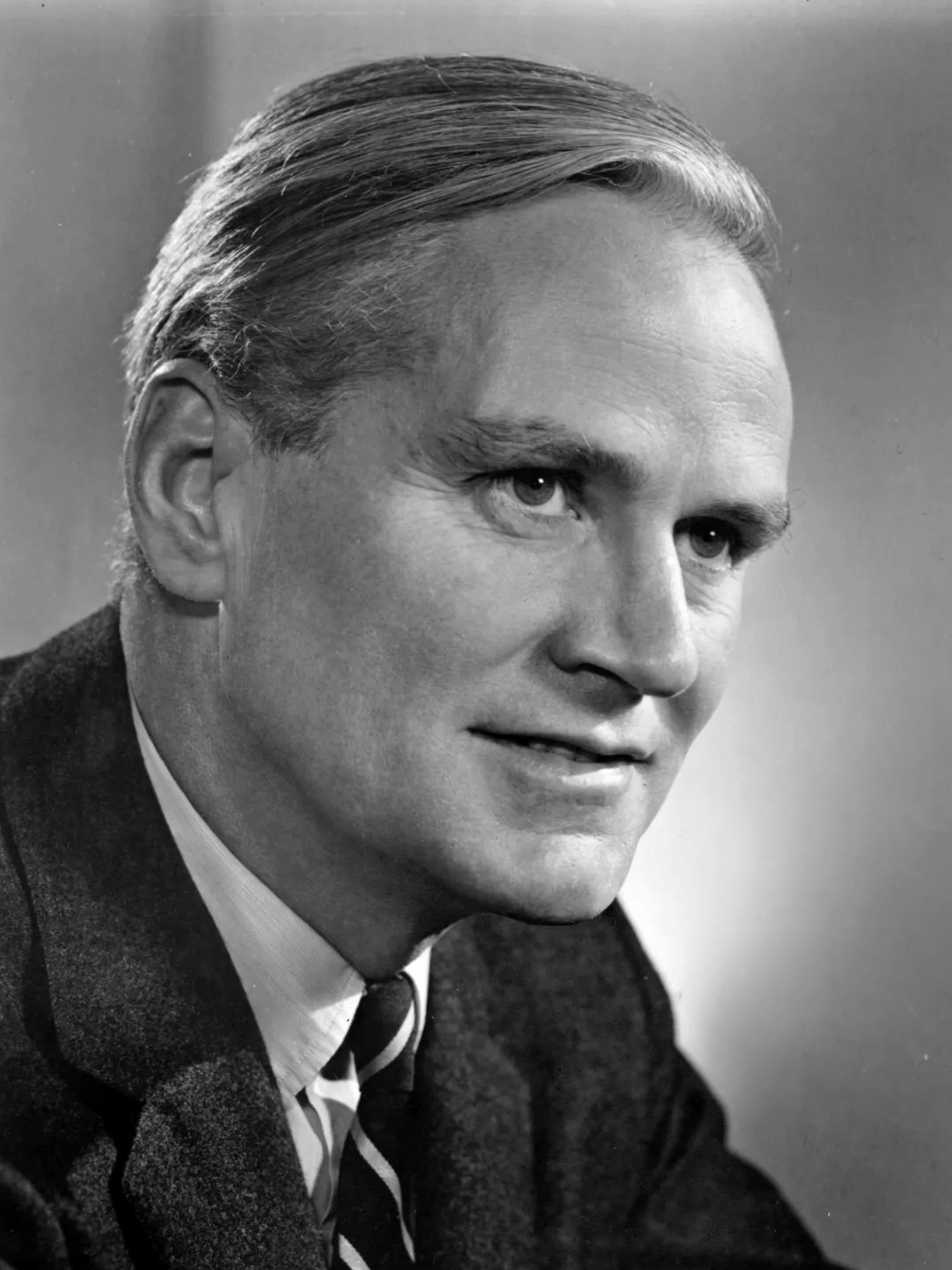

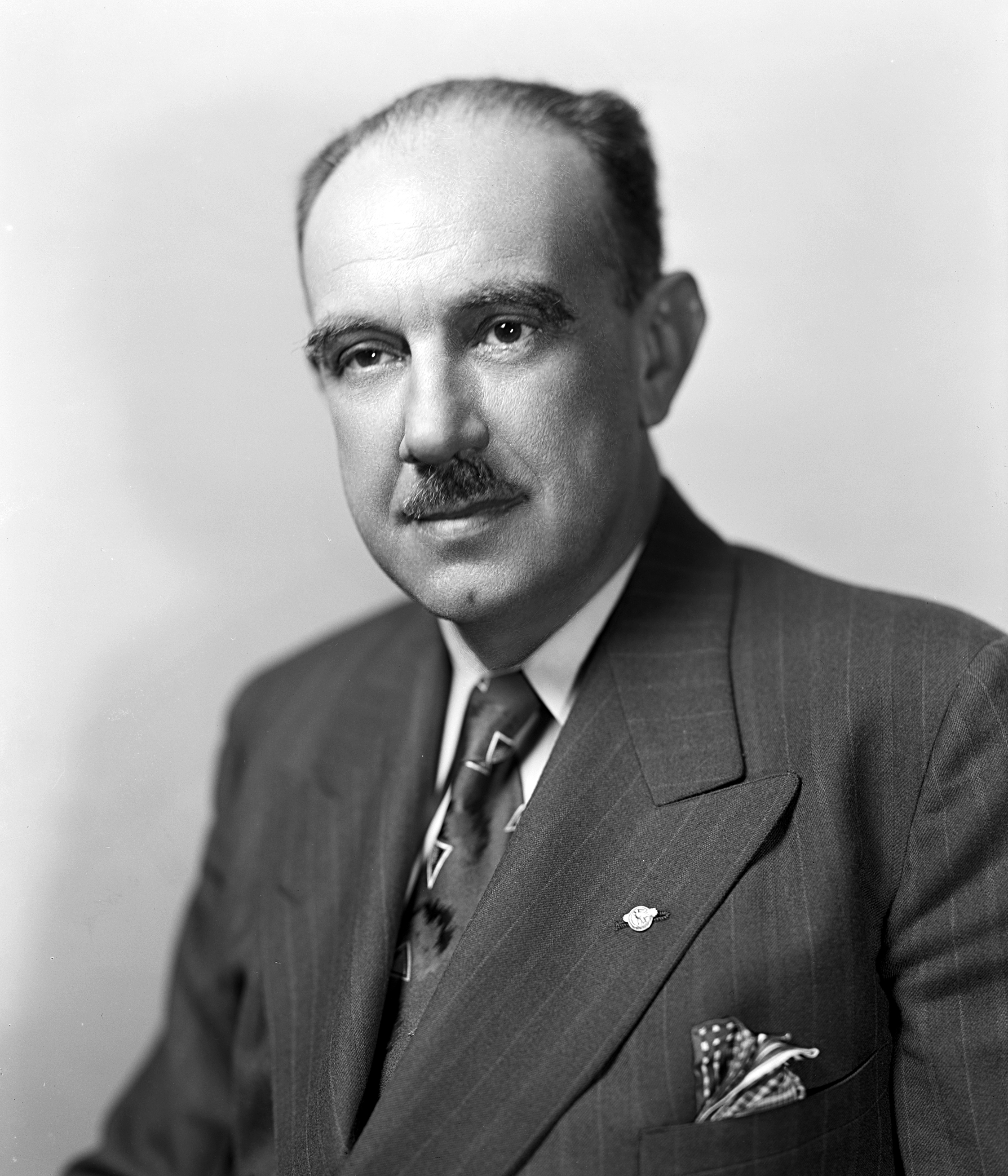
Nominee	Daniel Brewster	Edward Tylor Miller
Party	Democratic	Republican
Popular vote	439,723	269,131
Percentage	62.03%	37.97%
- County results Brewster: 50–60% 60–70% 70–80% Miller: 50–60% 60–70%
U.S. senator before election
John Marshall Butler
Republican
Elected U.S. Senator
Daniel Brewster
Democratic

The 1962 United States Senate election in Maryland was held on November 6, 1962. Incumbent Republican U.S. Senator John Marshall Butler did not run for re-election to a third term in office. Democratic U.S. Representative Daniel Brewster won the re-election to succeed him easily over Republican U.S. Representative Edward Tylor Miller.

== Republican primary ==
=== Candidates ===
- James P. Gleason, former legislative assistant to Senators Richard Nixon and William F. Knowland
- Henry J. Laque Jr., perennial candidate
- Edward Tylor Miller, U.S. Representative from Easton
- Harry L. Simms, real estate broker

==== Withdrew ====
- Herman L. Mills, former Mayor of Hagerstown

=== Results ===
1962 Republican U.S. Senate primary
Party	Candidate	Votes	%
Republican	Edward Tylor Miller	43,437	48.15%
Republican	James P. Gleason	34,523	38.27%
Republican	Harry L. Simms	7,689	8.52%
Republican	Henry J. Laque, Jr.	4,565	5.06%
Total votes		90,214	100.00%

== Democratic primary ==
=== Candidates ===
- Daniel Brewster, U.S. Representative from Reisterstown
- Elbert M. Byrd Jr., professor of government at the University of Maryland
- Andrew J. Easter, perennial candidate
- Herbert J. Hoover, Civil Engineer, Rockville, MD
- Blair Lee III, Delegate from Montgomery County and scion of the Lee family

=== Results ===
1962 Democratic U.S. Senate primary
Party	Candidate	Votes	%
Democratic	Daniel Brewster	182,272	52.18%
Democratic	Blair Lee III	100,915	28.89%
Democratic	Elbert M. Byrd, Jr.	32,147	9.20%
Democratic	Herbert J. Hoover	19,719	5.65%
Democratic	Andrew J. Easter	14,276	4.09%
Total votes		349,329	100.00%

== General election ==
=== Results ===
1962 U.S. Senate election in Maryland
Party	Candidate	Votes	%
Democratic	Daniel Brewster	439,723	62.03%
Republican	Edward Tylor Miller	269,131	37.97%
Total votes		708,854	100.00%
Democratic gain from Republican			

=== Results by county ===
County	Daniel Brewster Democratic		Edward Tylor Miller Republican Other		Margin		Total Votes Cast
County	#	%	#	%	#	%	Total Votes Cast
Allegany	10090	44.97%	12348	55.03%	-2258	-10.06%	22438
Anne Arundel	25522	61.41%	16036	38.59%	9486	22.83%	41558
Baltimore (City)	439723	62.03%	269131	37.97%	170592	24.07%	708854
Baltimore (County)	92742	67.38%	44889	32.62%	47853	34.77%	137631
Calvert	2306	62.31%	1395	37.69%	911	24.61%	3701
Caroline	2083	46.34%	2412	53.66%	-329	-7.32%	4495
Carroll	6719	53.30%	5888	46.70%	831	6.59%	12607
Cecil	4921	51.77%	4584	48.23%	337	3.55%	9505
Charles	4009	50.32%	3958	49.68%	51	0.64%	7967
Dorchester	4073	56.84%	3093	43.16%	980	13.68%	7166
Frederick	9234	54.68%	7652	45.32%	1582	9.37%	16886
Garrett	2080	37.69%	3438	62.31%	-1358	-24.61%	5518
Harford	9139	62.94%	5381	37.06%	3758	25.88%	14520
Howard	5397	54.26%	4550	45.74%	847	8.52%	9947
Kent	2538	50.29%	2509	49.71%	29	0.57%	5047
Montgomery	49323	50.61%	48139	49.39%	1184	1.21%	97462
Prince George's	44248	62.55%	26489	37.45%	17759	25.11%	70737
Queen Anne's	2752	55.62%	2196	44.38%	556	11.24%	4948
St. Mary's	3550	72.39%	1354	27.61%	2196	44.78%	4904
Somerset	2946	51.29%	2798	48.71%	148	2.58%	5744
Talbot	2461	37.57%	4090	62.43%	-1629	-24.87%	6551
Washington	12339	53.97%	10525	46.03%	1814	7.93%	22864
Wicomico	5523	49.78%	5571	50.22%	-48	-0.43%	11094
Worcester	2601	55.72%	2067	44.28%	534	11.44%	4668
Total	746319	60.34%	490493	39.66%	255826	20.68%	1236812

==== Counties that flipped from Republican to Democratic ====
- Anne Arundel
- Baltimore (County)
- Carroll
- Cecil
- Charles
- Dorchester
- Frederick
- Harford
- Howard
- Kent
- Montgomery
- Somerset
- Washington
- Worcester

== See also ==
- 1962 United States Senate elections
- 1962 United States elections
