= 1950 United States Senate election in Maryland =

- November 7, 1950
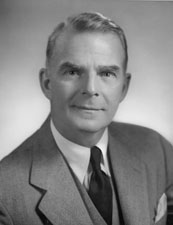

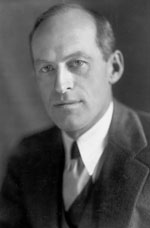
Nominee	John Marshall Butler	Millard Tydings
Party	Republican	Democratic
Popular vote	326,291	283,180
Percentage	53.00%	46.00%
- County results Butler: 50–60% 60–70% Tydings: 40–50% 50–60% 60–70%
U.S. senator before election
Millard Tydings
Democratic
Elected U.S. Senator
John Marshall Butler
Republican

The 1950 United States Senate election in Maryland was held on November 7, 1950. Incumbent Democratic U.S. Senator Millard Tydings ran for a fifth term in office, but was defeated by Republican John Marshall Butler.

== Democratic primary ==
=== Candidates ===
- John A. Meyer, former U.S. Representative from Baltimore
- Hugh J. Monaghan II
- Millard Tydings, incumbent Senator since 1927

=== Results ===
1950 Democratic U.S. Senate primary
Party	Candidate	Votes	%
Democratic	Millard Tydings (inc.)	172,577	66.30%
Democratic	Hugh J. Monaghan II	47,718	18.33%
Democratic	John A. Meyer	40,015	15.37%
Total votes		260,310	100.00%

== Republican primary ==
=== Candidates ===
- John Marshall Butler, Baltimore attorney
- D. John Markey, former University of Maryland football coach and candidate for Senate in 1946

=== Results ===
1950 Republican U.S. Senate primary
Party	Candidate	Votes	%
Republican	John Marshall Butler	32,902	48.61%
Republican	D. John Markey	34,791	51.40%
Total votes		47,136	100.00%

Although Markey received more raw votes than Butler, Butler received the highest unit vote at the State Convention and was nominated for Senate.

== General election ==
=== Results ===
1950 U.S. Senate election in Maryland
Party	Candidate	Votes	%
Republican	John Marshall Butler	326,291	53.00%
Democratic	Millard Tydings (inc.)	283,180	46.00%
Progressive	Samuel Fox	6,143	1.00%
Total votes		615,614	100.00%
Republican gain from Democratic			

=== Results by county ===
County	John Marshall Butler Republican		Millard Tydings Democratic		Samuel Fox Progressive		Margin		Total votes cast
County	#	%	#	%	#	%	#	%	Total votes cast
Allegany	16379	60.54%	10399	38.44%	278	1.03%	5980	22.10%	27056
Anne Arundel	13935	57.86%	9934	41.25%	213	0.88%	4001	16.61%	24082
Baltimore (City)	127968	53.01%	110262	45.67%	3195	1.32%	17706	7.33%	241425
Baltimore (County)	42419	51.59%	39346	47.86%	452	0.55%	3073	3.74%	82217
Calvert	1942	45.66%	2285	53.73%	26	0.61%	-343	-8.06%	4253
Caroline	2627	45.68%	3101	53.92%	23	0.40%	-474	-8.24%	5751
Carroll	7498	57.81%	5404	41.66%	69	0.53%	2094	16.14%	12971
Cecil	3727	38.85%	5816	60.62%	51	0.53%	-2089	-21.77%	9594
Charles	3493	55.43%	2749	43.62%	60	0.95%	744	11.81%	6302
Dorchester	4038	47.46%	4433	52.10%	38	0.45%	-395	-4.64%	8509
Frederick	10668	56.43%	8112	42.91%	126	0.67%	2556	13.52%	18906
Garrett	3824	63.72%	2128	35.46%	49	0.82%	1696	28.26%	6001
Harford	4679	36.78%	8001	62.90%	41	0.32%	-3322	-26.11%	12721
Howard	3649	48.08%	3793	49.98%	147	1.94%	-144	-1.90%	7589
Kent	2440	43.02%	3217	56.72%	15	0.26%	-777	-13.70%	5672
Montgomery	22467	54.39%	18261	44.21%	576	1.39%	4206	10.18%	41304
Prince George's	20599	56.26%	15675	42.81%	339	0.93%	4924	13.45%	36613
Queen Anne's	2090	41.35%	2931	57.99%	33	0.65%	-841	-16.64%	5054
St. Mary's	3093	49.36%	3115	49.71%	58	0.93%	-22	-0.35%	6266
Somerset	3507	52.45%	3138	46.93%	42	0.63%	369	5.52%	6687
Talbot	3324	47.28%	3678	52.31%	29	0.41%	-354	-5.03%	7031
Washington	13445	59.08%	9138	40.15%	175	0.77%	4307	18.93%	22758
Wicomico	5668	52.01%	5151	47.27%	79	0.72%	517	4.74%	10898
Worcester	2812	47.23%	3113	52.28%	29	0.49%	-301	-5.06%	5954
Total	326291	53.00%	283180	46.00%	6143	1.00%	43111	7.00%	615614

==== Counties that flipped from Democratic to Republican ====
- Anne Arundel
- Baltimore (County)
- Baltimore (City)
- Charles
- Frederick
- Montgomery
- Prince George's
- Somerset
- Wicomico

== See also ==
- 1950 United States Senate elections
- 1950 United States elections
