= 1968 United States Senate election in Maryland =

- November 5, 1968
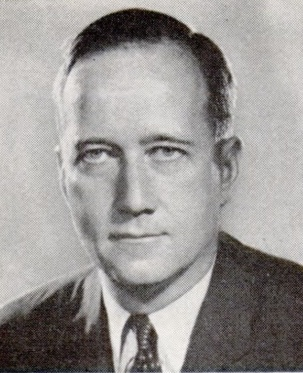

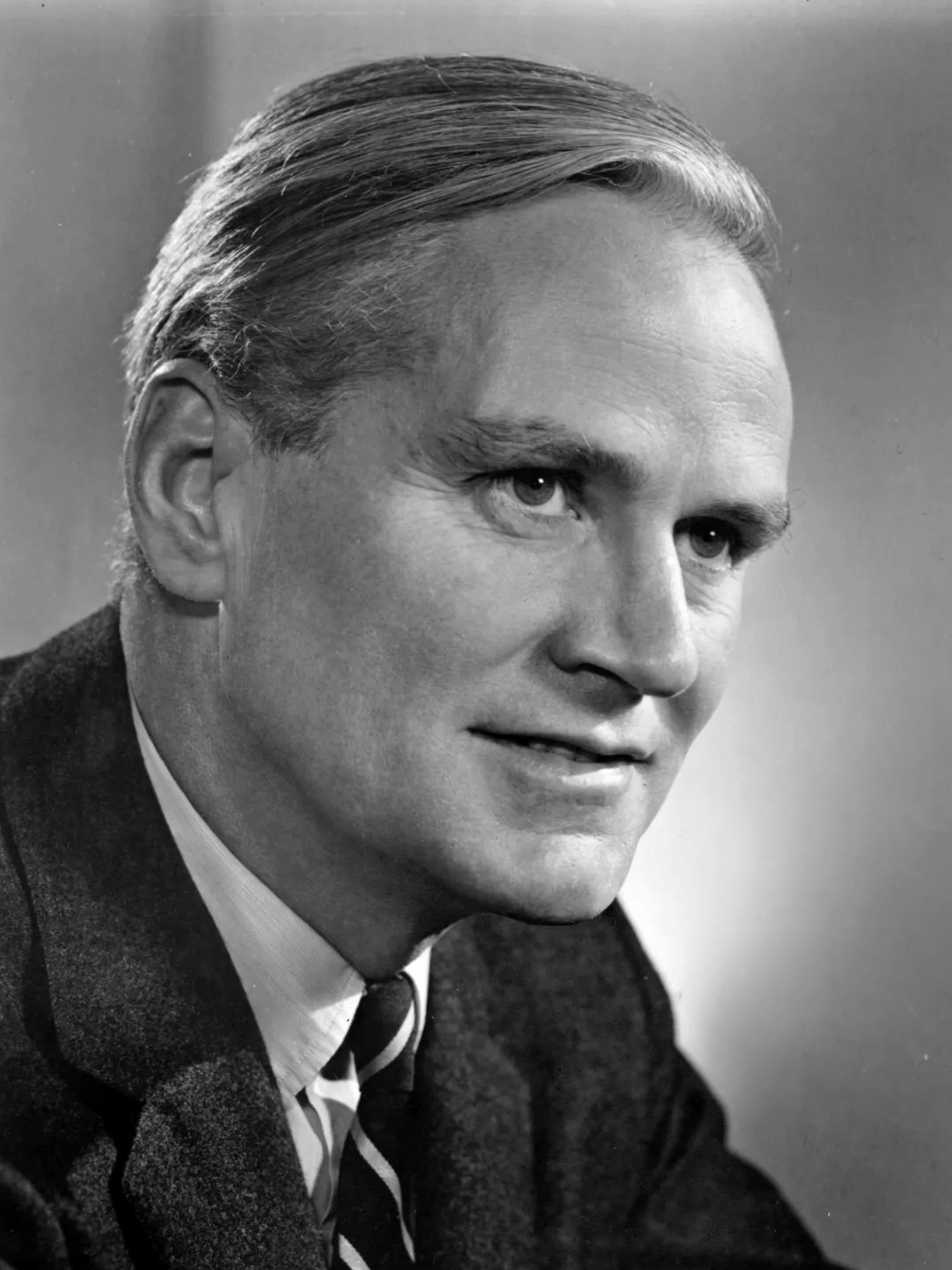

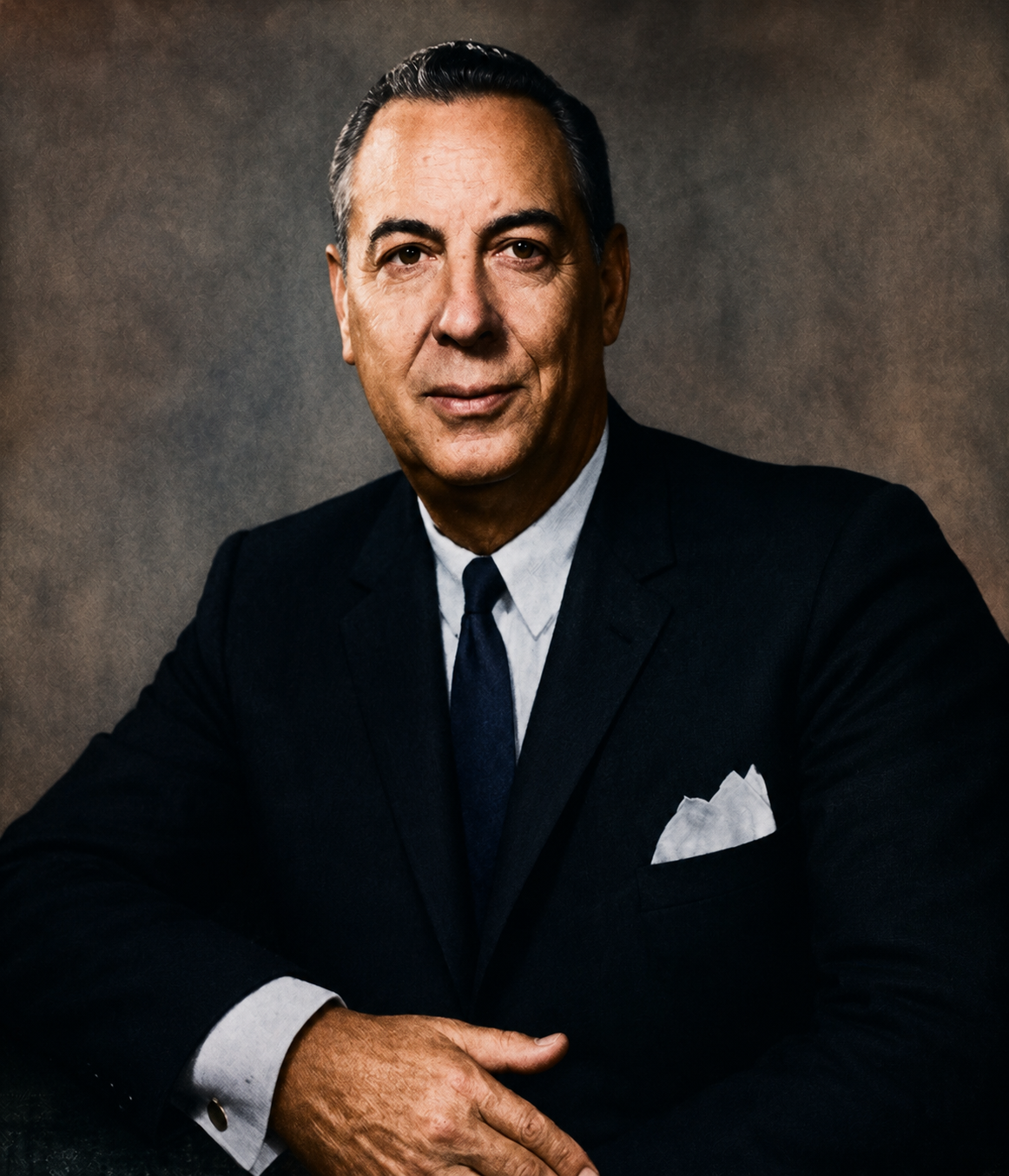
Nominee	Charles Mathias	Daniel Brewster	George P. Mahoney
Party	Republican	Democratic	American Independent
Popular vote	541,893	443,667	148,467
Percentage	47.79%	39.12%	13.09%
- County results Mathias: 30–40% 40–50% 50–60% 60–70% Brewster: 30–40% 40–50% 50–60%
U.S. senator before election
Daniel Brewster
Democratic
Elected U.S. Senator
Charles Mathias Jr.
Republican

The 1968 United States Senate election in Maryland was held on November 5, 1968. Incumbent Democratic U.S. Senator Daniel Brewster ran for re-election to a second term in office but was defeated by Republican U.S. Representative Charles Mathias.

Mathias may have benefited from the campaign of George P. Mahoney, the 1966 Democratic nominee for Governor of Maryland, who ran on the George Wallace American Independent ticket and garnered a significant chunk of the vote.

Mathias and Brewster were previously roommates while they attended the University of Maryland School of Law.

== Democratic primary ==
=== Candidates ===
- Daniel Brewster, incumbent Senator since 1963
- Wayne Gilchrist Finch, Baltimore patent lawyer
- Richard R. Howes
- Ross Zimmerman Pierpont, Timonium surgeon

=== Results ===
1968 Democratic U.S. Senate primary
Party	Candidate	Votes	%
Democratic	Daniel Brewster (inc.)	150,481	67.45%
Democratic	Ross Zimmerman Pierpont	38,555	17.28%
Democratic	Walter Gilchrist Finch	19,829	8.89%
Democratic	Richard R. Howes	14,224	6.38%
Total votes		223,089	100.00%

== Republican primary ==
=== Candidates ===
- Charles Mathias, U.S. Representative from Frederick
- Harry L. Simms, candidate for Senate in 1962
- Paul F. Wattay

=== Results ===
1968 Republican U.S. Senate primary
Party	Candidate	Votes	%
Republican	Charles Mathias	66,777	79.98%
Republican	Harry L. Simms	11,927	14.29%
Republican	Paul F. Wattay	4,790	5.74%
Total votes		83,494	100.00%

== General election ==
=== Results ===
1968 U.S. Senate election in Maryland
Party	Candidate	Votes	%
Republican	Charles Mathias	541,893	47.79%
Democratic	Daniel Brewster (inc.)	443,667	39.12%
American Independent	George P. Mahoney	148,467	13.09%
Total votes		1,134,027	100.00%
Republican gain from Democratic			

=== Results by county ===
County	Charlies Mathias Republican		Daniel Brewster Democratic		George P. Mahoney American Independent		Margin		Total Votes Cast
County	#	%	#	%	#	%	#	%	Total Votes Cast
Allegany	16390	52.83%	10963	35.34%	3672	11.84%	5427	17.49%	31025
Anne Arundel	34979	48.66%	24719	34.39%	12188	16.95%	10260	14.27%	71886
Baltimore (City)	86126	32.74%	139890	53.18%	37036	14.08%	-53764	-20.44%	263052
Baltimore (County)	106668	50.72%	69966	33.27%	33691	16.02%	36702	17.45%	210325
Calvert	1844	37.19%	1716	34.61%	1398	28.20%	128	2.58%	4958
Caroline	2616	48.72%	1769	32.95%	984	18.33%	847	15.78%	5369
Carroll	10906	59.07%	4694	25.42%	2863	15.51%	6212	33.65%	18463
Cecil	6466	49.23%	4926	37.51%	1742	13.26%	1540	11.73%	13134
Charles	3992	37.01%	4161	38.58%	2633	24.41%	-169	-1.57%	10786
Dorchester	3486	39.79%	2992	34.15%	2283	26.06%	494	5.64%	8761
Frederick	17688	66.78%	6863	25.91%	1934	7.30%	10825	40.87%	26485
Garrett	4086	64.57%	1478	23.36%	764	12.07%	2608	41.21%	6328
Harford	16046	53.55%	10042	33.51%	3876	12.94%	6004	20.04%	29964
Howard	9621	57.54%	4661	27.88%	2438	14.58%	4960	29.67%	16720
Kent	2611	46.92%	2066	37.12%	888	15.96%	545	9.79%	5565
Montgomery	106466	59.34%	62484	34.82%	10476	5.84%	43982	24.51%	179426
Prince George's	76073	47.93%	64636	40.72%	18018	11.35%	11437	7.21%	158727
Queen Anne's	2426	45.69%	1944	36.61%	940	17.70%	482	9.08%	5310
St. Mary's	2692	32.92%	3393	41.49%	2092	25.58%	-701	-8.57%	8177
Somerset	2660	45.18%	1996	33.91%	1231	20.91%	664	11.28%	5887
Talbot	4368	57.44%	2261	29.73%	976	12.83%	2107	27.71%	7605
Washington	18714	59.11%	9669	30.54%	3277	10.35%	9045	28.57%	31660
Wicomico	7698	46.09%	6667	39.92%	2337	13.99%	1031	6.17%	16702
Worcester	3128	52.51%	1886	31.66%	943	15.83%	1242	20.85%	5957
Total	547750	47.95%	445842	39.03%	148680	13.02%	101908	8.92%	1142272

==== Counties that flipped from Democratic to Republican ====
- Anne Arundel
- Baltimore (County)
- Calvert
- Carroll
- Cecil
- Dorchester
- Frederick
- Harford
- Howard
- Kent
- Montgomery
- Prince George's
- Queen Anne's
- Somerset
- Washington
- Worcester

== See also ==
- 1968 United States Senate elections
- 1968 United States elections
