= Daniel Brewster =

American politician (1923–2007)

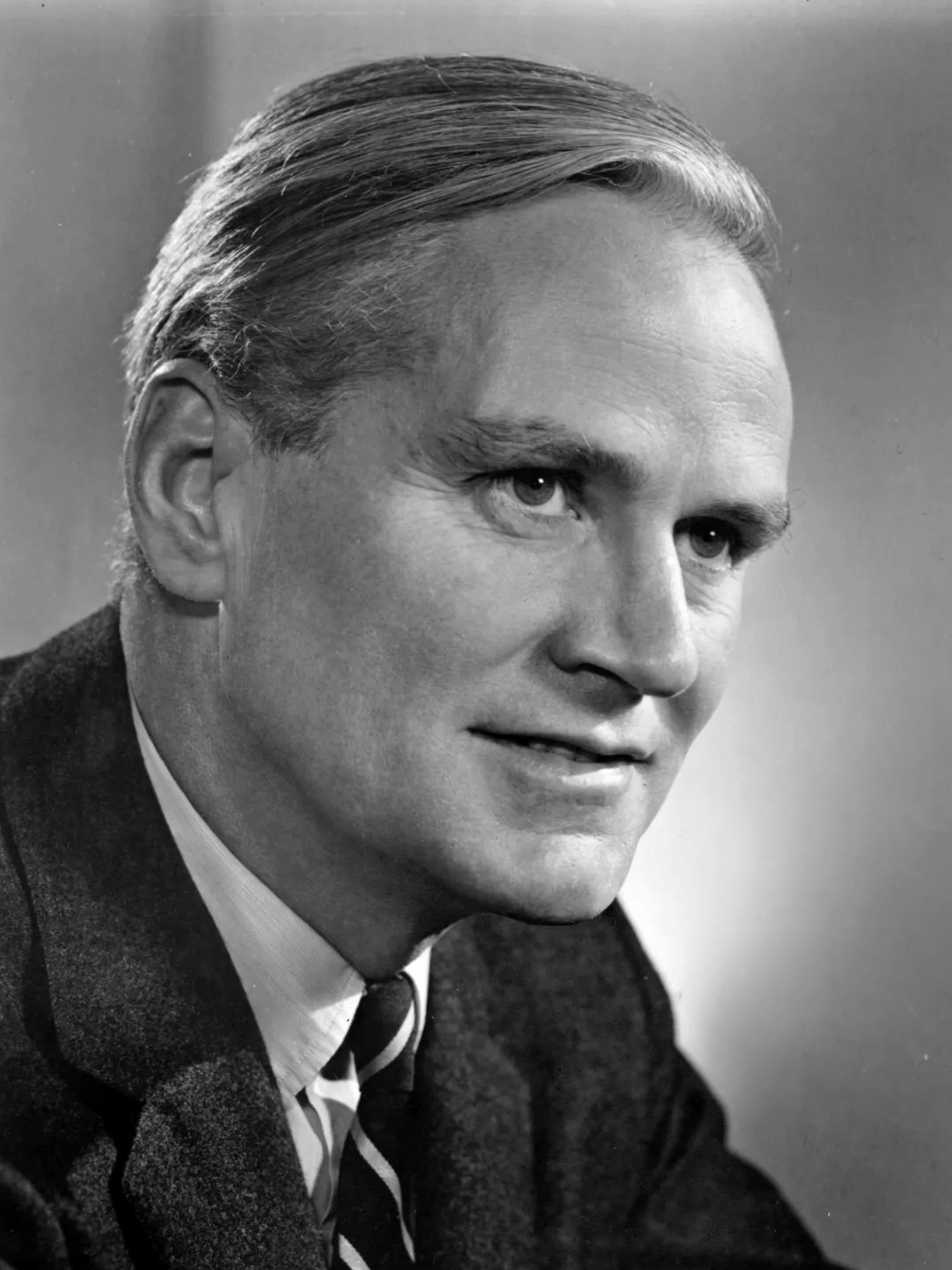

United States Senator from Maryland
- In office January 3, 1963 – January 3, 1969
- Preceded by: John Marshall Butler
- Succeeded by: Charles Mathias

Member of the U.S. House of Representatives from Maryland's 2nd district
- In office January 3, 1959 – January 3, 1963
- Preceded by: James Devereux
- Succeeded by: Clarence Long

Member of the Maryland House of Delegates
- In office 1950–1958

Personal details
- Born: Daniel Baugh Brewster Jr. November 23, 1923 Baltimore, Maryland, U.S.
- Died: August 19, 2007 (aged 83) Glyndon, Maryland, U.S.
- Party: Democratic
- Spouse(s): Carol Leiper DeHavenon (m. 1954; div. 1967) Anne Moen Bullitt (m. 1967; div. 1969) Judy Aarsand (m. 1976)
- Children: 5
- Relatives: Benjamin H. Brewster (great-grandfather)
- Education: Princeton University; Johns Hopkins University; University of Maryland, Baltimore (LLB)

Military service
- Allegiance: United States
- Branch/service: United States Marine Corps
- Years of service: 1942–1946 (active); 1946–1972 (reserve)
- Rank: Colonel
- Unit: United States Marine Corps Reserve
- Battles/wars: World War II; Battle of Guam; Battle of Okinawa
- Awards: Bronze Star; Purple Heart (2)

Daniel Baugh Brewster Sr. (November 23, 1923 – August 19, 2007) was an American attorney and politician from the state of Maryland. A member of the Democratic Party, he served in both chambers of the United States Congress as a member of the United States House of Representatives from 1959 to 1963 and as a member of the United States Senate from 1963 to 1969. Previously, he served as a member of the Maryland House of Delegates from 1950 to 1958 and from Maryland's 2nd congressional district from 1959 to 1963. After his Senate career, and following a lengthy court battle, Brewster pleaded no contest to a misdemeanor charge of accepting an illegal gratuity.

== Early life, education, and military service ==
Daniel Baugh Brewster, Sr. was born on November 23, 1923, in Baltimore County, Maryland, in the Green Spring Valley Region. He was the oldest of six children of Ottolie Y. (Wickes) and Daniel Baugh Brewster. Brewster was born into a wealthy family and was "raised in comfort on a beautifully appointed farm in Maryland fox-hunting country". The Washington Post described him as an "inheritor of the Baugh Chemical fortune". His father died when he was 10 years of age.

=== Education ===
Brewster was educated at the Gilman School in Baltimore City and at St. Paul's School in Concord, New Hampshire. He attended college at Princeton University and Johns Hopkins University before the U.S. entry into World War II.

After the war, Brewster again attended Johns Hopkins. He then enrolled at the University of Maryland Law School, from which he graduated with an LL.B. degree in June 1949. He was admitted to the bar in November 1949 and began practicing law in Towson, Maryland.

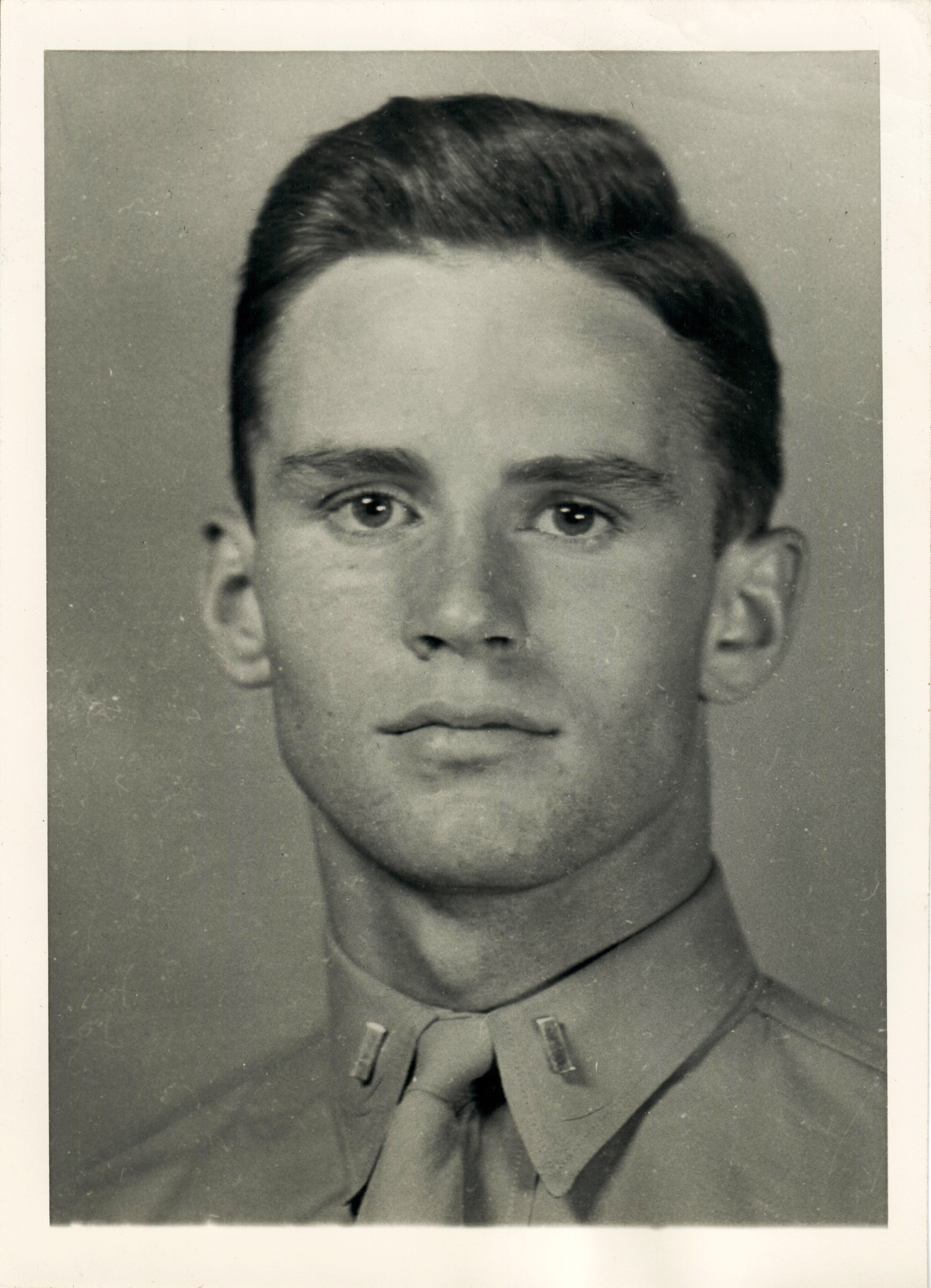
19-year-old Marine Lieutenant Daniel B. Brewster was wounded seven times during the battles for Guam and Okinawa and was awarded both the Bronze Star and the Purple Heart.

=== Military service ===
In 1942, Brewster enlisted in the United States Marine Corps. He was commissioned from the ranks in 1943. During World War II, he served in the Pacific theatre, including participating in the Battle of Guam and the Battle of Okinawa. For his actions during the war, he received a Bronze Star. He was wounded seven times, receiving a Purple Heart and a Gold Star in lieu of a second award. He left active duty in 1946 but continued in the Reserve until 1972, reaching the rank of colonel.

== Political career ==
=== Maryland House of Delegates (1950-1958) ===
Brewster, a Democrat, was elected as to the Maryland House of Delegates in 1950. At age 26, he was one of the youngest members of Maryland's state legislature in history. He served in the House of Delegates until 1958.

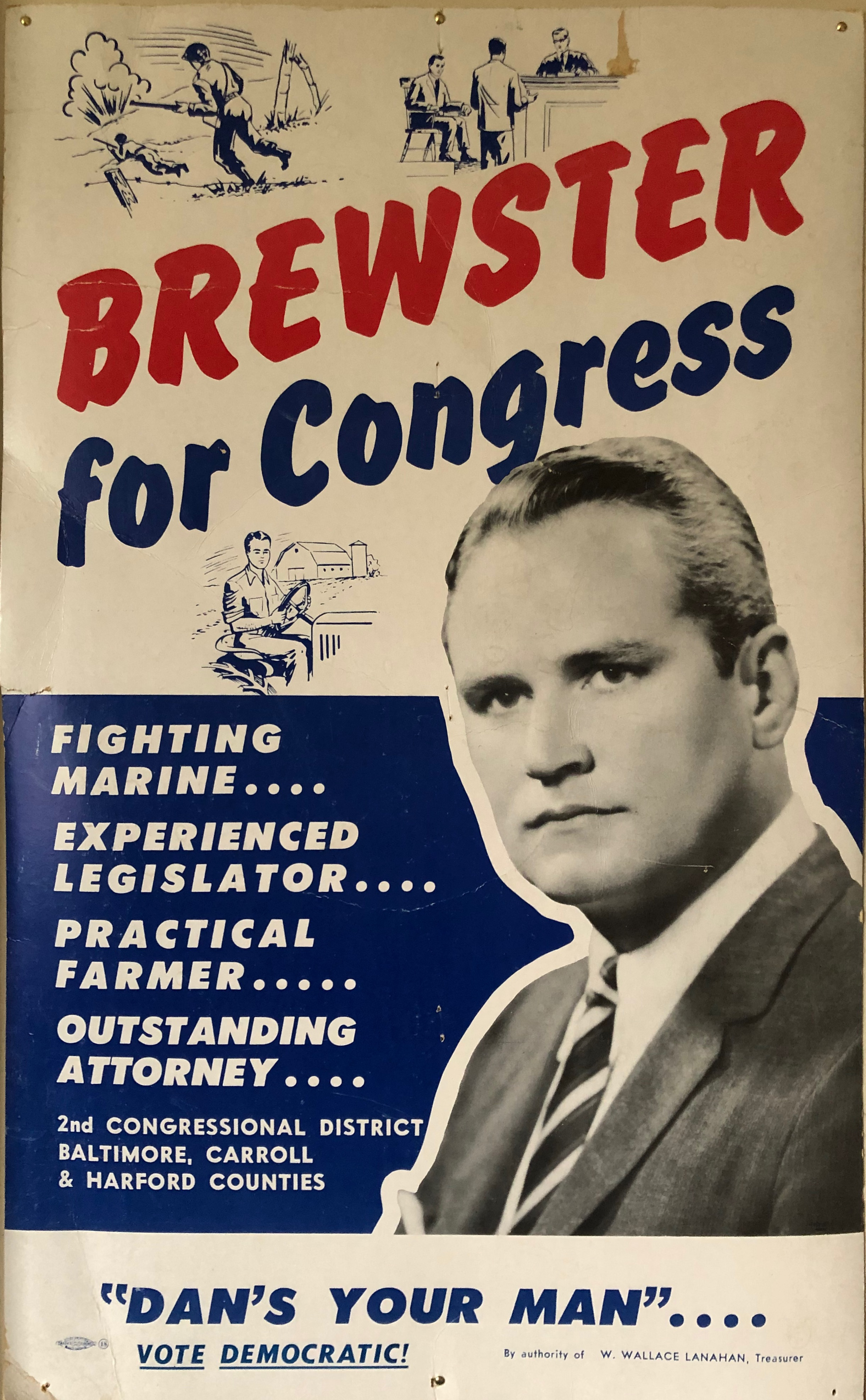
A 1958 campaign poster for Daniel Brewster in his run for the U.S. House of Representatives.

=== U.S. House of Representatives (1959-1963) ===
In 1958, Brewster was elected to the House of Representatives from the 2nd district of Maryland, defeating Republican J. Fife Symington Jr. He was a member of the House during the 86th and 87th Congresses, serving on the House Committee on Armed Services and on the subcommittee on Military Personnel, Manpower Utilization, and Emergency Defense Transportation. As a member of the House, Brewster voted for the Civil Rights Act of 1960.

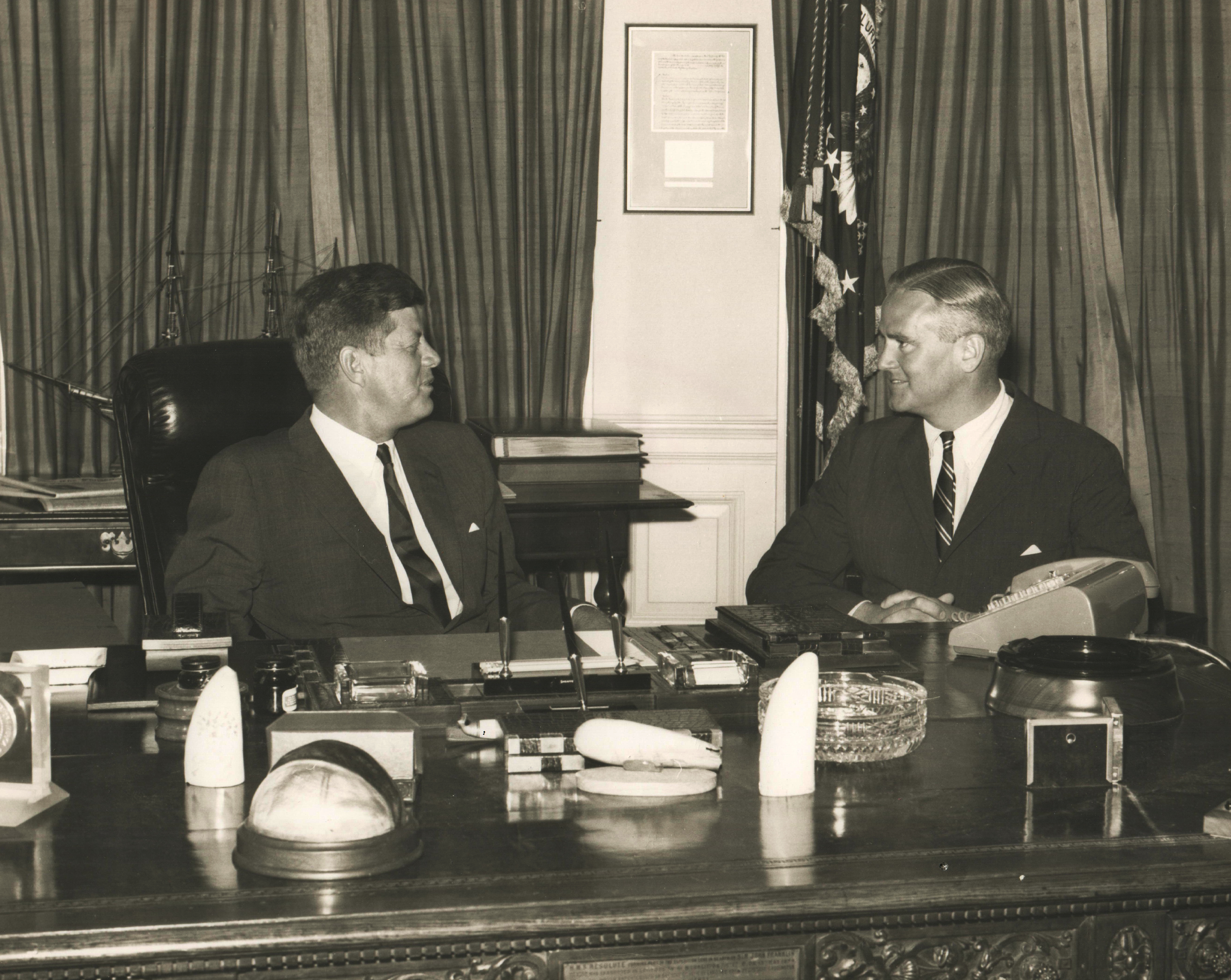
President John F. Kennedy invites Daniel Brewster to meet with him in the Oval Office after endorsing Brewster's campaign for the United States Senate in 1962.

=== U.S. Senate (1963-1969) ===
In 1962, Brewster ran for the United States Senate seat vacated by the retiring Republican senator John Marshall Butler. He defeated Congressman Edward Tylor Miller to become the first Democrat elected to the Senate from Maryland since 1946. Brewster served in the Senate from 1963 to 1969. In the Senate, Brewster voted in favor of the Civil Rights Acts of 1964, the Civil Rights Act of 1968, the Voting Rights Act of 1965, and the confirmation of Thurgood Marshall to the U.S. Supreme Court. Brewster was instrumental in the passage of the Civil Rights Act of 1964.

Brewster sought re-election to the Senate in 1968. However, "his complicated personal life, his support of the Vietnam War and his increasingly serious problems with alcohol took their toll", and he was defeated by Republican Charles Mathias.

In 1978, Brewster stated that the greatest mistake he made in his public life was his support for the Vietnam War.

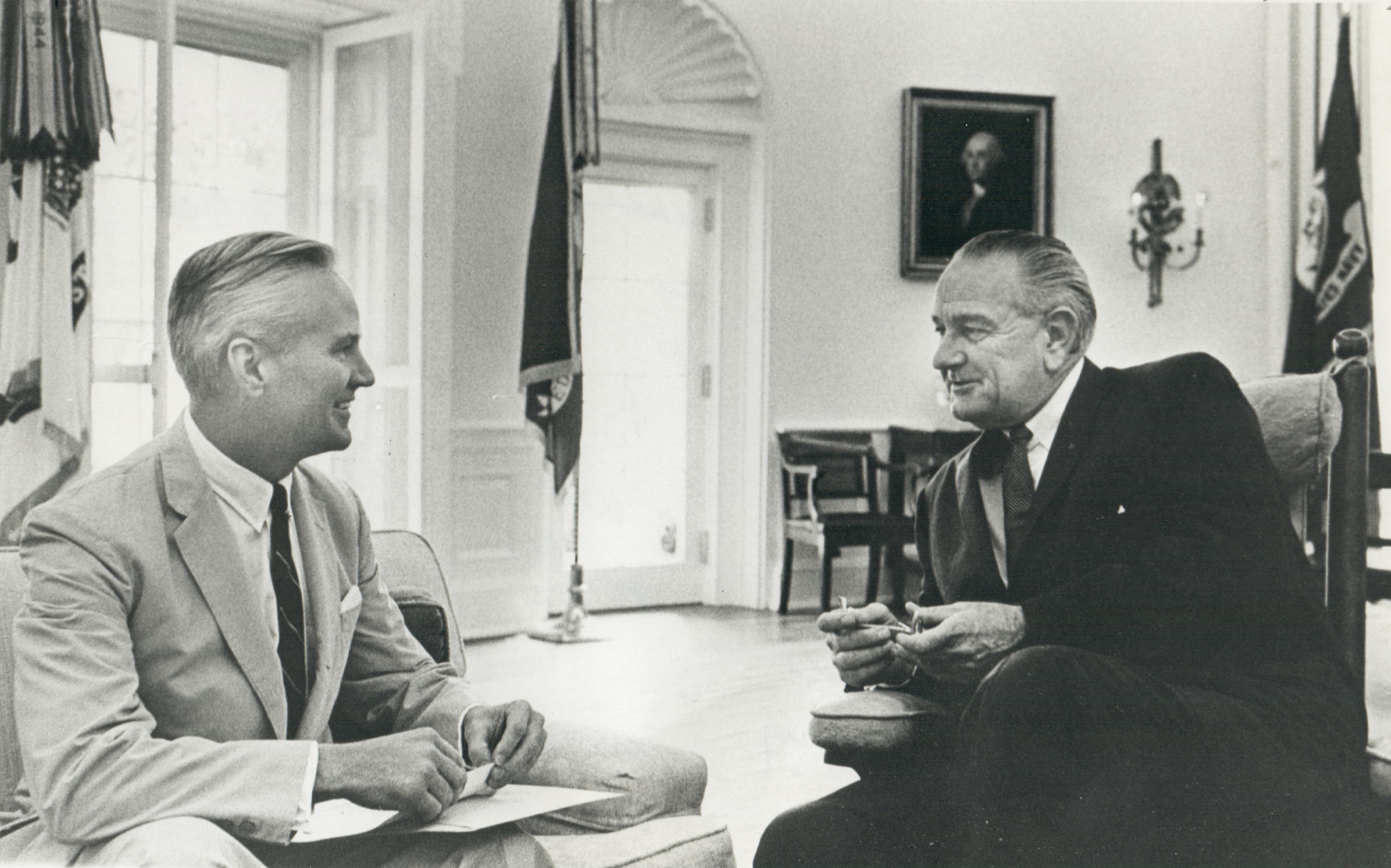
President Lyndon B. Johnson invites Senator Daniel Brewster to the Oval Office to thank him for running as Johnson's stand-in in the 1964 Maryland Democratic presidential primary.

=== 1964 presidential election ===
In 1964, Brewster ran in the Democratic presidential primaries against segregationist George Wallace. As Lyndon Johnson refused to run nationally, "favorite sons" were run in his place against Wallace, such as Matthew E. Welsh of Indiana and John W. Reynolds of Wisconsin. Brewster won his state's primary but was embarrassed by Wallace's showing of 43 percent; he barely carried Baltimore County.

== Legal troubles ==
In 1969, Brewster was indicted on 10 criminal counts of solicitation and acceptance of bribes while a United States senator, as well as two counts of accepting illegal gratuities. The charges stemmed from a campaign contribution by Spiegel, Inc., a mail-order firm. Brewster maintained his innocence.

At trial, the judge dismissed five of the charges, saying that Brewster's actions were protected under the Speech or Debate Clause of the U.S. Constitution. The prosecution appealed directly to the U.S. Supreme Court, which heard the case in 1971 and 1972. In June 1972, the Court held 6 to 3 in United States v. Brewster that the taking of illegal bribes was not protected speech, as taking of a bribe was not part of the "performance of a legislative function".

The charges were reinstated. Brewster stood trial and was found "not guilty" of the bribery charges but was convicted of accepting an unlawful gratuity "without corrupt intent." However, in August 1974, his conviction was overturned on appeal due to the trial judge's improper instructions to the jury. In 1975, he pleaded no contest to a single misdemeanor charge of accepting an illegal gratuity "without corrupt intent" and was fined and allowed to keep his law license. The government dropped the other charges.

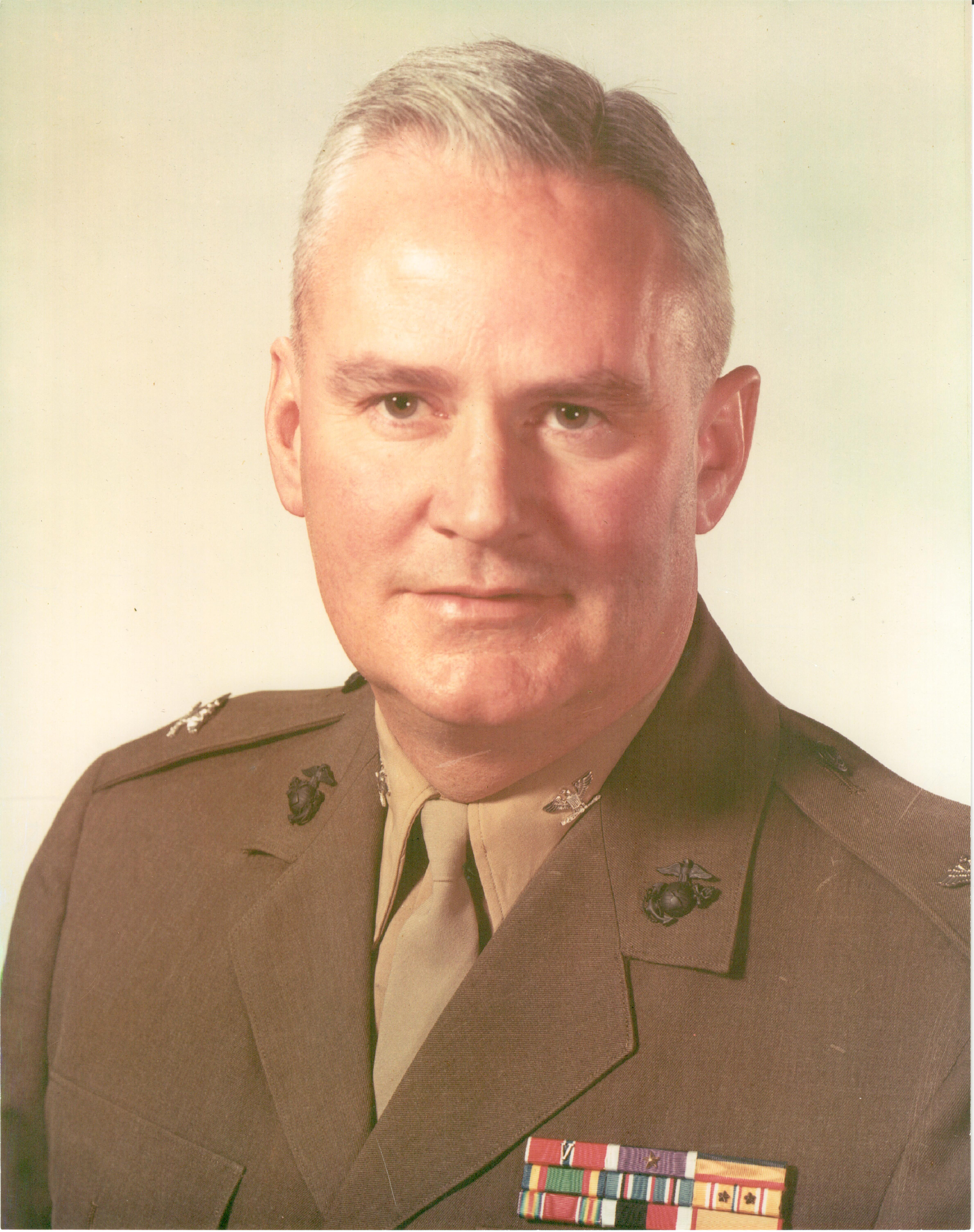
Daniel Brewster retired from the Marine Corps as a Colonel after thirty years of service.

== Post-Senate career ==
After leaving the Senate, Brewster took up farming in Glyndon, Maryland.

As of 1978, Brewster operated his farm, worked as an alcoholism counselor at a veterans' hospital, led the Governor's Advisory Council on Alcoholism, and worked at "a quarter-way house in Baltimore".

== Personal life and death ==
Brewster married Carol Leiper DeHavenon of Philadelphia in 1954. The couple had two sons, Daniel Baugh Brewster, Jr. (born 1956) and Gerry Leiper Brewster (born 1958).

In 1967, Brewster "attended the funeral of William Bullitt, the U.S. ambassador to France. There, he became reacquainted with Anne Bullitt, Mr. Bullitt's daughter and Mr. Brewster's first fiancee, who had jilted the senator while he was overseas during the war". Brewster divorced his first wife. On April 29, 1967, he married Anne Bullitt (1924–2007) at Glyndon, Maryland. Brewster's second marriage also ended in divorce.

Brewster was an alcoholic. According to his account, his drinking began to spiral out of control in 1964; by 1969, he was "'drinking with a vengeance'", and he almost died following an "alcoholic collapse". He sought inpatient rehabilitation multiple times, and reportedly became sober in 1973.

In 1976, Brewster married Judy Lynn Aarsand after meeting her at an alcohol treatment facility. The couple had three children, Danielle (born 1977) and twins Jennilie and Dana (born 1979). Judy died on October 11, 2024, at her home in Stuart, Florida.

Brewster survived large cell lymphoma and leukemia in the 1980s.

Brewster died of liver cancer on August 19, 2007, at age 83. He was the last living former U.S. senator who left office in the 1960s. He is buried at Saint Thomas' Episcopal Church Cemetery, Owings Mills, Maryland.

== Legacy ==
Several individuals who served on Brewster's Senate staff in the 1960s later became politically prominent, including Nancy Pelosi and Steny Hoyer.

In 2023, a biography of Brewster by John W. Frece, Self-Destruction: The Rise, Fall, and Redemption of U.S. Senator Daniel B. Brewster, was published by Loyola University Maryland's Apprentice House Press.

== See also ==
- List of American federal politicians convicted of crimes
- List of federal political scandals in the United States

U.S. House of Representatives
Preceded by James P. Devereux	Member of the U.S. House of Representatives from Maryland's 2nd congressional district 1959–1963	Succeeded by Clarence Long
Party political offices
Preceded by George P. Mahoney	Democratic nominee for U.S. Senator from Maryland (Class 3); 1962, 1968	Succeeded by Barbara Mikulski
U.S. Senate
Preceded by John Marshall Butler	U.S. Senator (Class 3) from Maryland; 1963–1969; Served alongside: J. Glenn Beall, Joseph Tydings	Succeeded by Charles Mathias
