= Thomas Alan Goldsborough =

American judge

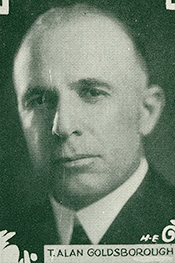
- Goldsborough c. 1925-1927

Judge of the United States District Court for the District of Columbia
- In office February 23, 1939 – June 16, 1951
- Appointed by: Franklin D. Roosevelt
- Preceded by: Seat established by 52 Stat. 584
- Succeeded by: Luther Youngdahl

Member of the U.S. House of Representatives from Maryland's 1st district
- In office March 4, 1921 – April 5, 1939
- Preceded by: William Noble Andrews
- Succeeded by: David Jenkins Ward

Personal details
- Born: Thomas Alan Goldsborough; September 16, 1877 Greensboro, Maryland, U.S.
- Died: June 16, 1951 (aged 73) Washington, D.C., U.S.
- Resting place: Denton Cemetery; Denton, Maryland, U.S.
- Party: Democratic
- Relatives: Robert Goldsborough; Charles Goldsborough
- Education: Washington College (B.A.); University of Maryland School of Law (LL.B.)

Thomas Alan Goldsborough (September 16, 1877 – June 16, 1951) was a United States representative from Maryland and a United States district judge of the United States District Court for the District of Columbia.

== Education and career ==
Born in Greensboro, Caroline County, Maryland, Goldsborough attended the public schools and the local academy at Greensboro. He received a Bachelor of Arts degree from Washington College of Chestertown, Maryland, in 1899. In 1901, he graduated with a Bachelor of Laws from the University of Maryland School of Law, was admitted to the bar the same year, and commenced practice in Denton, Maryland. He served as prosecuting attorney for Caroline County from 1904 to 1908, returning to private practice from 1908 to 1921.

== Congressional service ==
Goldsborough was elected as a Democrat to the United States House of Representatives of the 67th United States Congress, beginning his congressional service on March 4, 1921. He was reelected to the nine succeeding Congresses. He also served as regent of the Smithsonian Institution from 1932 to 1939. He resigned his seat on April 5, 1939, to assume a federal judgeship.

=== Goldsborough bill ===
In 1932, Goldsborough introduced the so-called "Goldsborough bill", which passed the House, and failed in the Senate. According to Robert Latham Owen, a supporter of the bill, "…the bill which he (Goldsborough) then presented, with the approval of the Committee on Banking and Currency of the House — and I believe it was practically a unanimous report. It was debated for two days in the House, a very simple bill, declaring it to be the policy of the United States to restore and maintain the value of money, and directing the Secretary of the Treasury, the officers of the Federal Reserve Board, and the Reserve banks to make effective that policy. That was all, but enough, and it passed, not by a partisan vote. There were 117 Republicans who voted for that bill (which was presented by a Democrat) and it passed by 289 to 60, and of the 60 who voted against it, only 12, by the will of the people, remain in the Congress. "It was defeated by the Senate, because it was not really understood. There had not been sufficient discussion of it in public. There was not an organized public opinion in support of it."

== Federal judicial service ==
On January 20, 1939, Goldsborough was nominated by President Franklin D. Roosevelt to a new Associate Justice seat on the District Court of the United States for the District of Columbia (Judge of the United States District Court for the District of Columbia from June 25, 1948) created by 52 Stat. 584. He was confirmed by the United States Senate on February 16, 1939, and received his commission on February 23, 1939. Goldsborough served in that capacity until his death on June 16, 1951, in Washington, D.C. He was interred in Denton Cemetery in Denton.

== Family ==
Thomas was great-great-great-grandson of Robert Goldsborough and great-grandson of Charles Goldsborough. Goldsboro, Maryland, is named after the family.

== Pushing on a string ==
Some sources credit Goldsborough with introducing the phrase pushing on a string—a metaphor for the difficulty experienced by the Federal Reserve in trying to end an economic contraction—in a 1935 hearing.

== Sources ==
- United States Congress. "Thomas Alan Goldsborough (id: G000265)". Biographical Directory of the United States Congress.

U.S. House of Representatives
Preceded by William Noble Andrews	Member of the U.S. House of Representatives from Maryland's 1st congressional district 1921–1939	Succeeded by David Jenkins Ward
Legal offices
Preceded by Seat established by 52 Stat. 584	Judge of the United States District Court for the District of Columbia; 1939–1951	Succeeded by Luther Youngdahl
