= Edward Tylor Miller =

American politician (1895–1968)

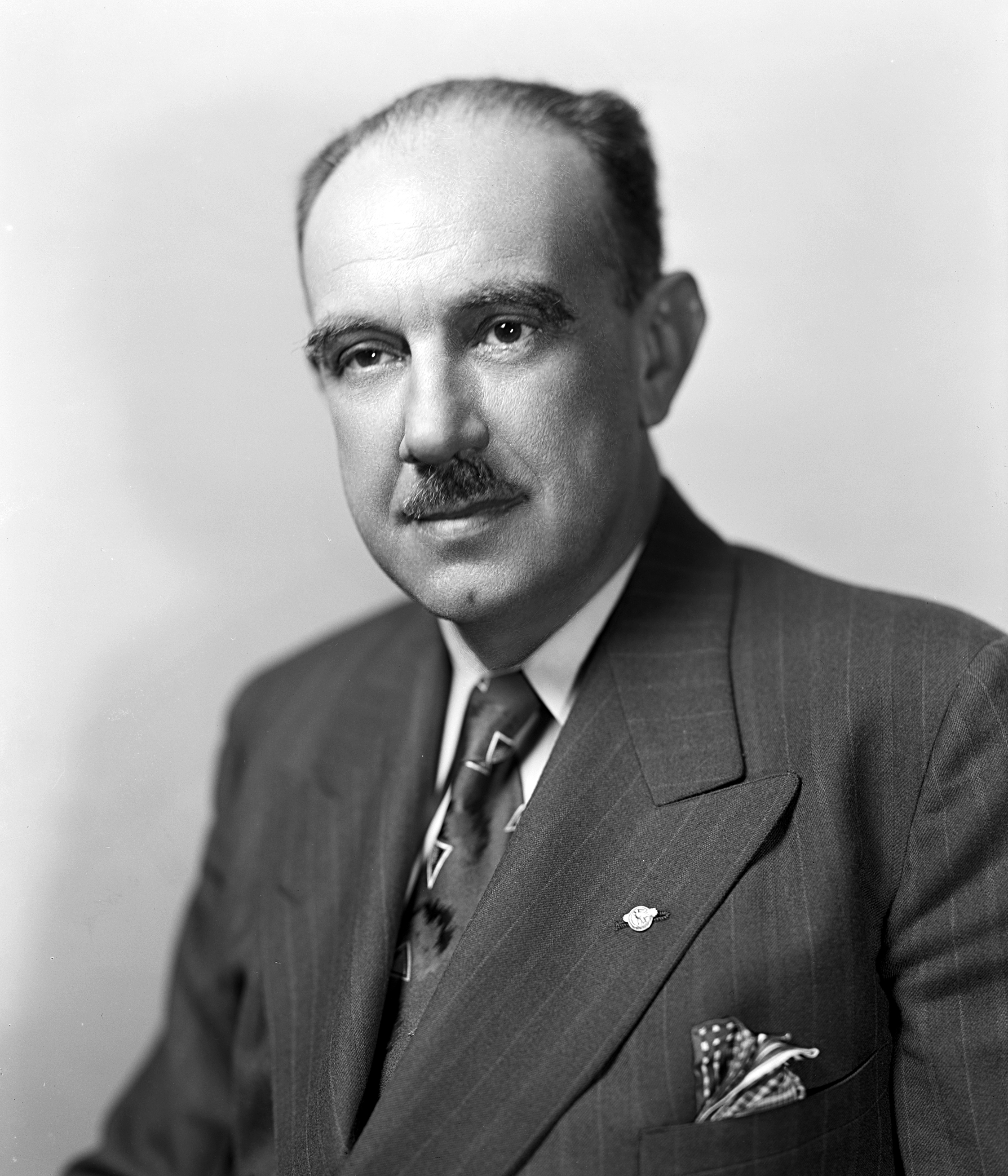

Member of the U.S. House of Representatives from Maryland's 1st district
- In office January 3, 1947 – January 3, 1959
- Preceded by: Dudley Roe
- Succeeded by: Thomas Francis Johnson

Personal details
- Born: February 1, 1895 Silver Spring, Maryland, U.S.
- Died: January 20, 1968 (aged 72) Easton, Maryland, U.S.
- Party: Republican
- Education: Yale University; George Washington University

Edward Tylor Miller (February 1, 1895 – January 20, 1968), a Republican, was a U.S. congressman who represented Maryland's 1st congressional district from 1947 to 1959.

Miller was born in Woodside, a neighborhood in Silver Spring, Maryland. He attended Sidwell Friends School of Washington, D.C., and graduated from Yale University in 1916. During the First World War, Miller served in the United States Army as commanding officer of Company C of the 320th Infantry in the 80th Infantry Division from May 14, 1917, to August 8, 1919.

After the War, Miller studied law at George Washington University in Washington, D.C. He was admitted to the bar in 1920 and commenced practice in Easton, Maryland. He served as Referee in Bankruptcy from 1923 to 1941, and as police and juvenile judge for Talbot County, Maryland from 1934 to 1938. During the Second World War, Miller served as a colonel in the Infantry in the U.S. Army from 1942 to 1946, where he saw duty in North Africa, India, and China.

In 1946, Miller defeated the incumbent Democrat, who had ousted the previous incumbent Democrat in 1944. Miller was elected as a Republican to the Eightieth and to the five succeeding Congresses, serving from January 3, 1947, to January 3, 1959. Miller did not sign the 1956 Southern Manifesto and voted in favor of the Civil Rights Acts of 1957. He sponsored one successful public bill, concerning fishing contests. Miller was an unsuccessful candidate for reelection in 1958 to the Eighty-sixth Congress in a Democratic wave against the Eisenhower Administration and failed to regain the seat in 1960. Miller later served as vice chairman of the United States Delegation to Second United Nations Conference on the Law of the Sea at Geneva, Switzerland, in 1960. He unsuccessfully sought candidacy in 1962 for the United States Senate, and afterwards resumed the practice of law. He served as Republican national committeeman from 1960–1964, as delegate to the Republican National Convention of 1964, and was elected Talbot County delegate to Maryland Constitutional Convention of 1967. Miller died in Easton, and is interred in Meeting House Cemetery.

Party political offices
Preceded by John Marshall Butler	Republican nominee for U.S. Senator from Maryland (Class 3); 1962	Succeeded by Charles Mathias
U.S. House of Representatives
Preceded by Dudley Roe	Member of the U.S. House of Representatives from Maryland's 1st congressional district 1947–1959	Succeeded by Thomas Francis Johnson
