= John Marshall Butler =

American politician (1897–1978)

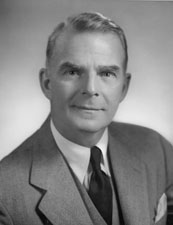

United States Senator from Maryland
- In office January 3, 1951 – January 3, 1963
- Preceded by: Millard Tydings
- Succeeded by: Daniel Brewster

Personal details
- Born: July 21, 1897 Baltimore, Maryland, U.S.
- Died: March 14, 1978 (aged 80) Rocky Mount, North Carolina, U.S.
- Party: Republican
- Education: Johns Hopkins University; University of Maryland Law School

Military service
- Branch/service: United States Army
- Years of service: 1917–1919
- Battles/wars: World War I

John Marshall Butler (July 21, 1897 – March 14, 1978) was an American lawyer and politician. A Republican, he served as a United States Senator from Maryland from 1951 to 1963.

== Early life and career ==
Born in Baltimore, Maryland, to John Harvey and Eunice West (née Riddle) Butler, he received his early education at public schools in his native city. He worked as a paperboy and later an employee at a mattress factory. During World War I, he served as a private in 110th Field Artillery (29th Division) of the US Army from 1917 to 1918.

After his military service, he returned to Baltimore and attended Johns Hopkins University (1919-1921) before joining his father's real estate business. He studied nights at the University of Maryland School of Law, where he received his law degree in 1926. After his admission to the bar, he joined the Baltimore law firm of Venable, Baetjer & Howard, where he worked until 1950. He served as a member of City Service Commission of Baltimore from 1947 to 1949.

== Political career ==
In 1950, Butler was elected as a Republican to the United States Senate from Maryland. In the Republican primary, he lost the popular vote to D. John Markey by a margin of 51%-49%, but won the nomination after receiving a larger unit vote count at the state convention. In the general election, he faced four-term Democratic incumbent Millard Tydings. Butler received strong support from Senator Joseph McCarthy of Wisconsin, whose accusations of Communist infiltration into the State Department had been rejected by the Tydings Committee. During the campaign, McCarthy's staff distributed a pamphlet that featured a falsified photograph showing Tydings with Communist leader Earl Browder. Butler eventually defeated Tydings by a margin of 53%-46%.

Following the election results, Tydings petitioned the Senate to disqualify Butler due to McCarthy's campaign tactics. The Senate subsequently convened a special subcommittee, which declared that Butler's campaign used "despicable methods" against Tydings and fined one of his aides $5,000, but refused to expel Butler. Butler admitted to paying the printer of the pamphlet and described the falsified photograph as "a product of enthusiastic but ill-advised friends."

During his tenure in the Senate, Butler established himself as a staunch conservative. He sponsored the Communist Control Act of 1954, which outlawed the Communist Party and authorized the prosecution of Communist-infiltrated organizations. When the federal courts blocked some prosecutions, Butler submitted a constitutional amendment in 1955 to limit the courts' jurisdiction and an omnibus bill in 1958 for the same purpose. He was one of the twenty-two Senators who voted against the censure of Senator McCarthy in 1954. He supported returning offshore oil lands to the states, and voted in favor of the non-interventionist Bricker Amendment.

In 1956, Butler was re-elected to a second term after defeating Democrat George P. Mahoney by a margin of 53%-47%. Former Senator Tydings had originally won the Democratic nomination, but later dropped out of the race due to poor health. Butler decided not to seek re-election to a third term in 1962. Butler did not sign the 1956 Southern Manifesto, and voted in favor of the Civil Rights Acts of 1957 and 1960, but did not vote on the 24th Amendment to the U.S. Constitution. In 1959 he was the lone Republican senator to vote against Hawaiian statehood.

== Later life ==
After retiring from the Senate, Butler returned to Baltimore. At 80, he died from a heart attack in Rocky Mount, North Carolina, as he and his wife were returning from a vacation on St. Simons Island in Georgia. He is buried at Druid Ridge Cemetery in Pikesville.

Party political offices
Preceded by Blanchard Randall, Jr.	Republican nominee for U.S. Senator from Maryland (Class 3); 1950, 1956	Succeeded by Edward Tylor Miller
U.S. Senate
Preceded by Millard Tydings	U.S. senator (Class 3) from Maryland; 1951–1963; Served alongside: Herbert O'Conor, James Glenn Beall	Succeeded by Daniel Brewster
Preceded by Andrew Frank Schoeppel	Ranking Member of the Senate Commerce Committee; 1962–1963	Succeeded by Norris Cotton
