= Thomas Francis Johnson =

American politician (1909–1988)

Thomas Johnson
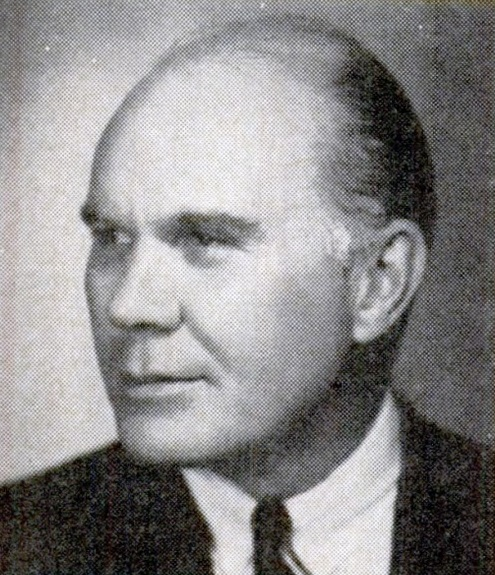

Member of the U.S. House of Representatives from Maryland's 1st district
- In office January 3, 1959 – January 3, 1963
- Preceded by: Edward Tylor Miller
- Succeeded by: Rogers Morton

Member of the Maryland Senate
- In office 1939–1951

Personal details
- Born: Thomas Francis Johnson; June 26, 1909 Worcester County, Maryland, U.S.
- Died: February 1, 1988 (aged 78) Seaford, Delaware, U.S.
- Party: Democratic
- Education: St. John's College, Maryland; University of Virginia; University of Maryland, College Park

Thomas Francis Johnson (June 26, 1909 – February 1, 1988) was a U.S. congressman who represented Maryland's 1st congressional district from January 3, 1959 to January 3, 1963. He lost his third re-election after criminal charges were brought against him.

Born in Worcester County, Maryland. He later graduated from Staunton Military Academy of Virginia in 1926, St. John's College, the University of Virginia, and the University of Maryland, College Park. He was admitted to the bar and commenced the practice of law in Snow Hill, Maryland. In 1932, he was elected chairman of the board of Commercial National Bank of Snow Hill. Johnson specialized in international law with practice in the Far East, Middle East, and continental Europe.

In 1934, at the age of 24, Johnson was appointed as state's attorney for Maryland, and, at age 28, he was elected to the Maryland State Senate, where he served from 1939 to 1951. He was the youngest man in state history to serve in those positions up to that point. In 1958, he was elected as a Democrat to the U.S. House of Representatives, and served (in the Eighty-sixth and Eighty-seventh Congresses) from 3 January 1959 until 3 January 1963. Johnson voted in favor of the Civil Rights Act of 1960.

== Charges ==
In 1962, while he was running for re-election, charges were brought against him regarding the receipt of illegal gratuities in Congress. He was convicted of conspiracy and conflict of interest in 1968, served three and a half months of a six-month sentence in jail, and paid a $5,000 fine.

He lost his 1962 re-election bid.

After Congress, Johnson resumed the practice of law and lived in Berlin, Maryland until his death in a car crash in Seaford, Delaware in 1988.

== See also ==
- List of American federal politicians convicted of crimes

== Notes ==
U.S. House of Representatives
Preceded by Edward Tylor Miller	Member of the U.S. House of Representatives from Maryland's 1st congressional district 1959–1963	Succeeded by Rogers Morton
