= 1947 United States House of Representatives elections =

1947 U.S. House of Representatives elections
- January 28, 1947 – November 18, 1947

12 (out of 435) seats in the U.S. House of Representatives 218 seats needed for a majority
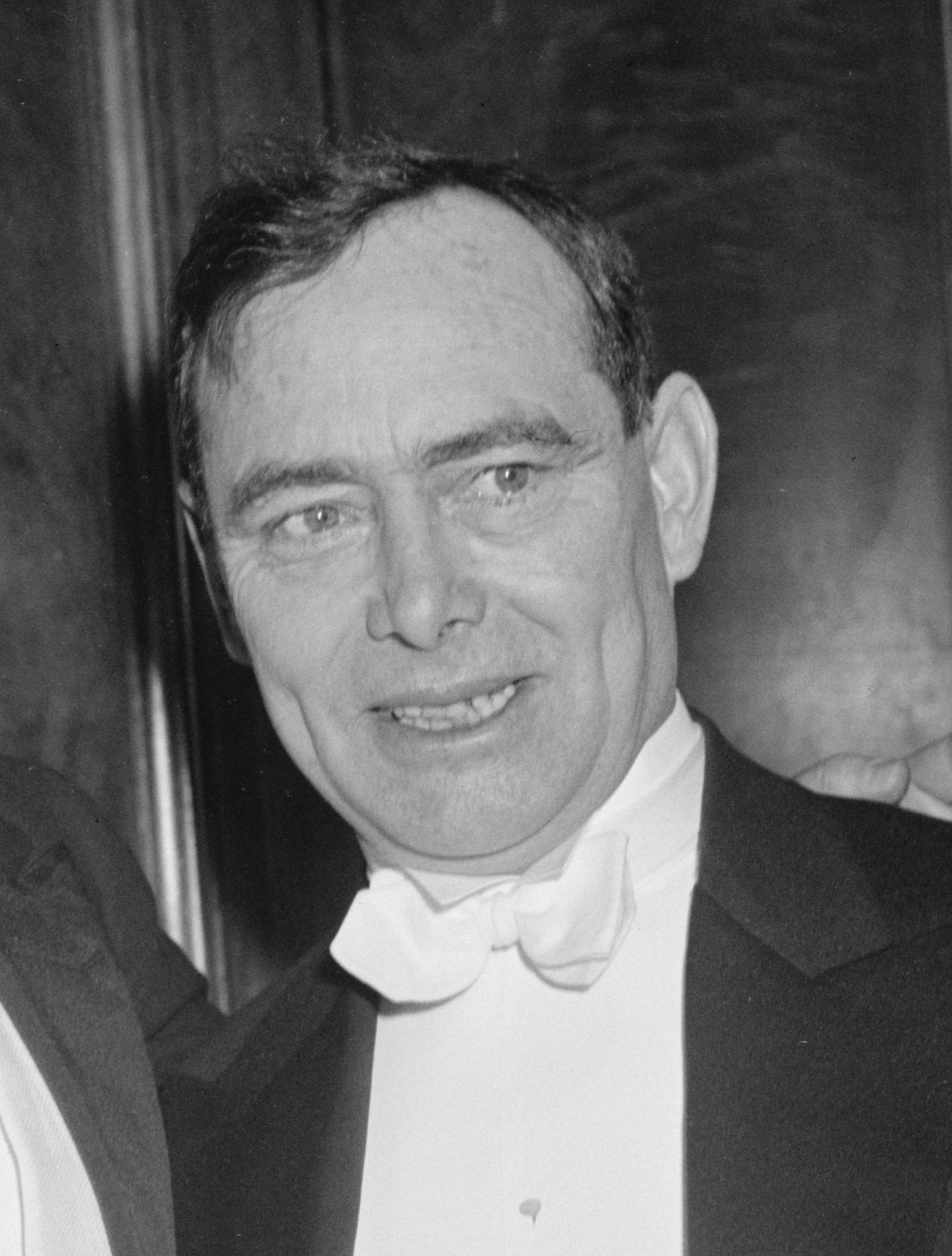

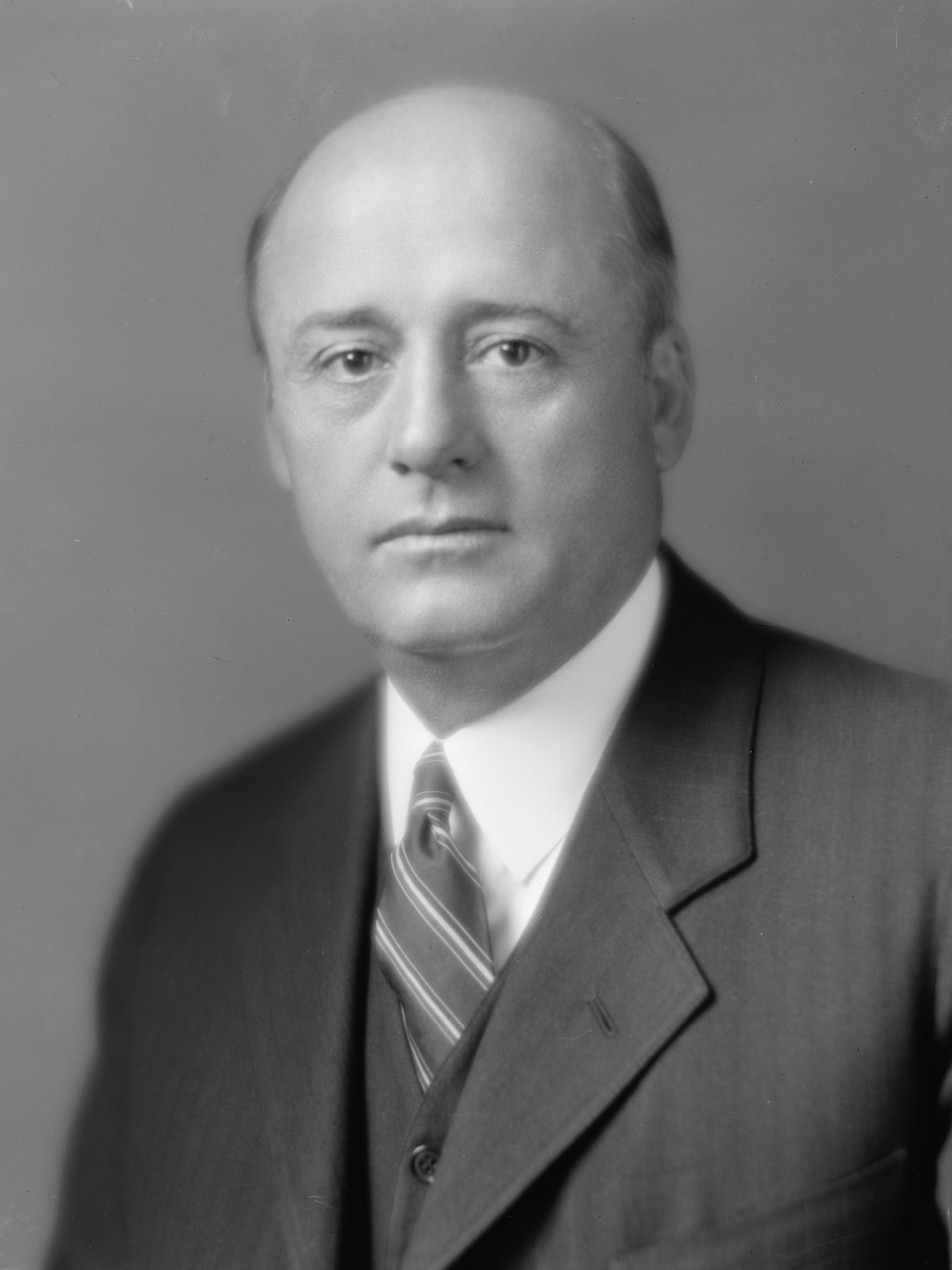
| | Majority party | Minority party |
|---|---|---|
| Leader | Joseph W. Martin Jr. | Sam Rayburn |
| Party | Republican | Democratic |
| Leader's seat | Massachusetts 14th | Texas 4th |
| Seats won | 7 | 5 |
| Seat change | 0 | 0 |

There were twelve special elections in 1947 to the United States House of Representatives during the 80th United States Congress. Each party held all of its seats elected in 1947, with the majority Republican Party keeping its seven seats, and President Harry Truman's Democratic Party keeping its five. Therefore, no party lost or gained U.S. House seats in 1947.

Of the twelve vacancies, seven were caused by the incumbent's death during their term or before their term after they had been elected to it. Five resigned during their term.

== List of elections ==
Elections are listed by date and district.

| District | Incumbent | | | This race | |
| District | Member | Party | First elected | Results | Candidates |
|---|---|---|---|---|---|
| Alabama 8 | John Sparkman | Democratic | 1936 | Incumbent resigned November 5, 1946 to become U.S. Senator. New member elected January 28, 1947. Democratic hold. | ▌ ✓ Robert E. Jones Jr. (Democratic); Unopposed |
| Wisconsin 2 | Robert K. Henry | Republican | 1944 | Incumbent died November 20, 1946. New member elected April 22, 1947. Republican hold. | ▌ ✓ Glenn R. Davis (Republican) 50.58%; ▌Carl W. Thompson (Democratic) 48.81%; ▌Mary Jo Uphoff (Socialist) 0.61% |
| Washington 3 | Fred B. Norman | Republican | 1946 | Incumbent died April 18, 1947. New member elected June 7, 1947. Republican hold. | ▌ ✓ Russell V. Mack (Republican) 51.45%; ▌Charles R. Savage (Democratic) 48.55% |
| Maryland 3 | Thomas D'Alesandro Jr. | Democratic | 1938 | Incumbent resigned May 16, 1947 to become mayor of Baltimore. New member elected July 15, 1947. Democratic hold. | ▌ ✓ Edward Garmatz (Democratic) 52.90%; ▌Simon P. Jarosinski (Independent) 30.71%; ▌Edward S. Panetti (Republican) 16.40% |
| Texas 9 | Joseph J. Mansfield | Democratic | 1916 | Incumbent died July 12, 1947. New member elected August 23, 1947. Democratic hold. | ▌ ✓ Clark W. Thompson (Democratic) 45.78%; ▌L. J. Sulak (Democratic) 32.87%; ▌J. C. Trahan (Democratic) 12.99%; ▌George W. Hill (Democratic) 5.79%; ▌V. M. Stokes (Democratic) 0.93%; ▌Morris Schreiber (Republican) 0.85% |
| Texas 16 | R. Ewing Thomason | Democratic | 1930 | Incumbent resigned July 31, 1947 to become U.S. District Judge. New member elected August 23, 1947. Democratic hold. | ▌ ✓ Kenneth M. Regan (Democratic) 43.50%; ▌Woodrow W. Bean Sr. (Democratic) 38.33%; ▌Victor B. Gilbert (Democratic) 8.47%; ▌Ord R. Gary (Democratic) 6.37%; Others: ▌Louis A. Fail (Democratic) 2.02%; ▌James W. Metcalfe (Democratic) 0.77%; ▌Pat Hargrove (Democratic) 0.55% |
| Michigan 11 | Fred Bradley | Republican | 1938 | Incumbent died May 24, 1947. New member elected August 26, 1947. Republican hold. | ▌ ✓ Charles E. Potter (Republican) 69.96%; ▌Harold D. Beaton (Democratic) 30.03% |
| Pennsylvania 8 | Charles L. Gerlach | Republican | 1938 | Incumbent died May 5, 1947. New member elected September 9, 1947. Republican hold. | ▌ ✓ Franklin H. Lichtenwalter (Republican) 61.37%; ▌Phil H. Storch (Democratic) 38.63% |
| Indiana 10 | Raymond S. Springer | Republican | 1938 | Incumbent died August 28, 1947. New member elected November 4, 1947. Republican hold. | ▌ ✓ Ralph Harvey (Republican) 53.73%; ▌Frank A. Hanley (Democratic) 43.84%; ▌Carl W. Thompson (Prohibition) 2.43% |
| New York 14 | Leo F. Rayfiel | Democratic | 1944 | Incumbent resigned September 13, 1947. New member elected November 4, 1947. Democratic hold. | ▌ ✓ Abraham J. Multer (Democratic) 58.18%; ▌Victor Rabinowitz (American Labor) 25.29%; ▌Jacob P. Lefkowitz (Republican) 16.53% |
| Ohio 4 | Robert F. Jones | Republican | 1938 | Incumbent resigned September 2, 1947 to join the FCC. New member elected November 4, 1947. Republican hold. | ▌ ✓ William M. McCulloch (Republican) 55.28%; ▌Joseph B. Quatman (Democratic) 44.72% |
| Massachusetts 9 | Charles L. Gifford | Republican | 1942 | Incumbent died August 23, 1947. New member elected November 18, 1947. Republican hold. | ▌ ✓ Donald W. Nicholson (Republican) 57.71%; ▌Jacinto F. Diniz (Democratic) 42.24% |
