= 1958 United States House of Representatives elections =

House elections for the 86th U.S. Congress

- November 4, 1958 (Note: September 8, 1958 in Maine)

All 436 seats in the United States House of Representatives 219 seats needed for a majority
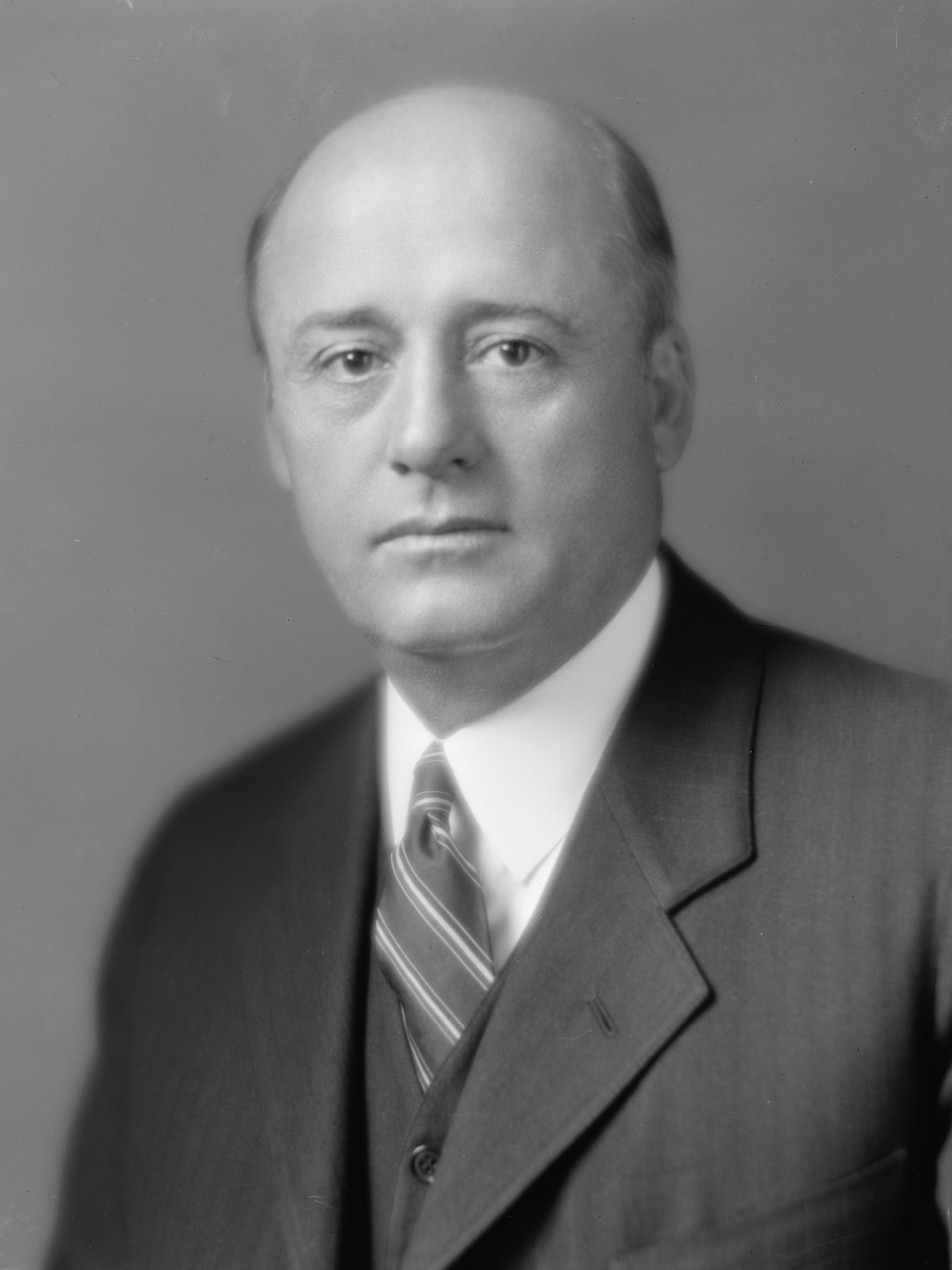

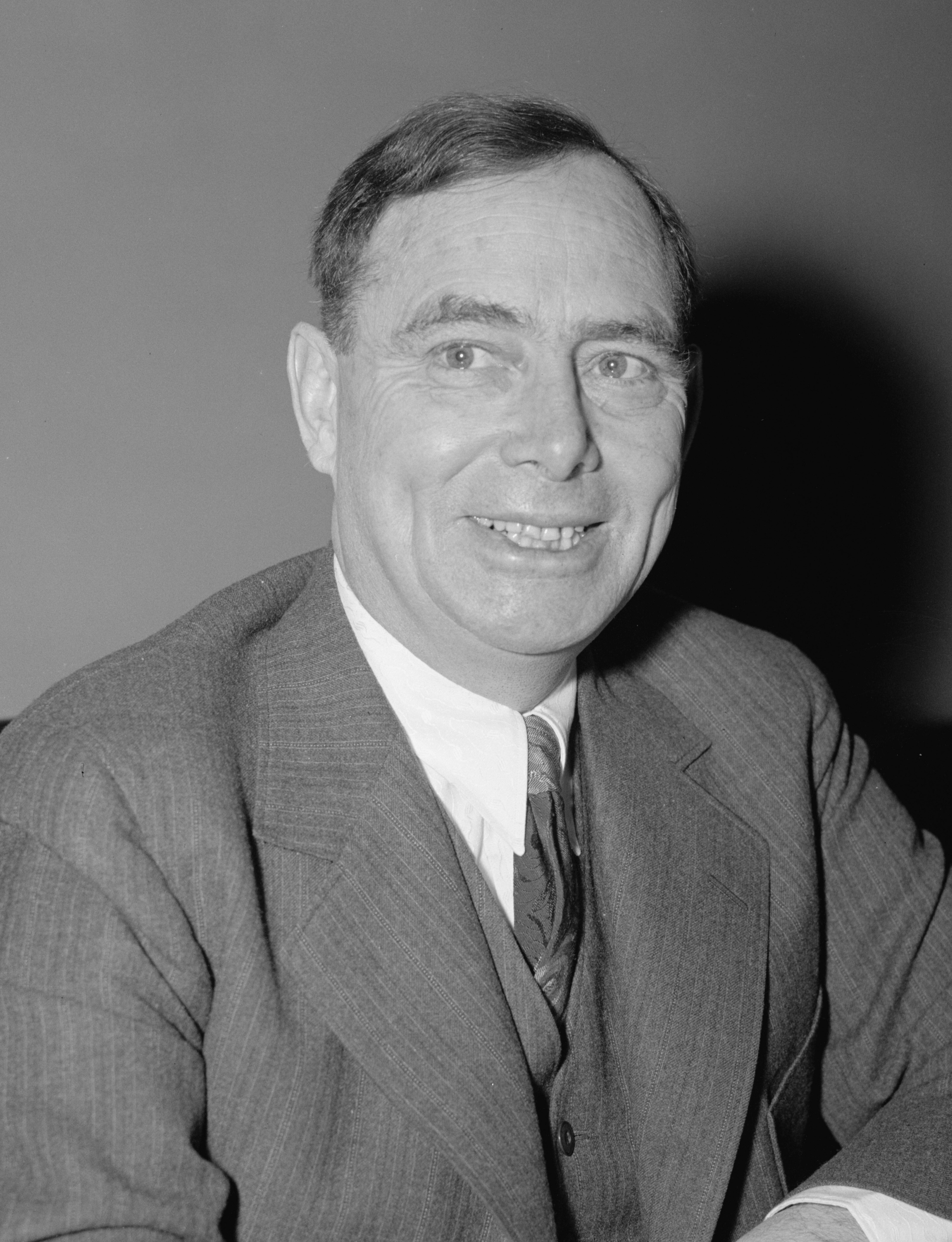
	Majority party	Minority party
Leader	Sam Rayburn	Joseph Martin
Party	Democratic	Republican
Leader since	September 16, 1940	January 3, 1939
Leader's seat	Texas 4th	Massachusetts 14th
Last election	234 seats	201 seats
Seats won	283	153
Seat change	▲49	▼48
Popular vote	25,604,679	19,931,409
Percentage	56.0%	43.6%
Swing	▲4.8pp	▼5.1pp
- Results: Democratic hold Democratic gain Republican hold Republican gain
Speaker before election
Sam Rayburn
Democratic
Elected Speaker
Sam Rayburn
Democratic

The 1958 United States House of Representatives elections was an election for the United States House of Representatives to elect members to serve in the 86th United States Congress. They were held for the most part on November 4, 1958, in the middle of Dwight Eisenhower's second presidential term, while Maine held theirs on September 8. There were 436 seats during these elections: 435 from the reapportionment in accordance with the 1950 census, and one seat for Alaska, the new state that would officially join the union on January 3, 1959.

The economy was suffering the Recession of 1958, which Democrats blamed on Eisenhower. The President's Republican Party lost 48 seats in this midterm election, increasing the Democratic Party's majority to a commanding level that Republicans would not be able to overcome for another 36 years. Another factor which may have contributed to the Democratic gains include public consternation over the launch of Sputnik and Cold War politics. Busing was an issue in the election, specifically criticism of the Eisenhower administration's policy in the South and legislation related to the same.

Disappointment with the results led House Republicans to replace Minority Leader Joseph W. Martin Jr. with his deputy, Charles Halleck.

== Overall results ==
394 incumbent members sought reelection, but 3 were defeated in primaries and 37 defeated in the general election for a total of 354 incumbents winning.

↓
283	153
Democratic	Republican

Party	Total seats	Change	Seat percentage	Vote percentage	Popular Vote
Democratic	283	▲49	64.9%	56.0%	25,604,679
Republican	153	▼48	35.1%	43.6%	19,931,409
Liberal	0	Steady	0.0%	0.2%	72,215
Independent	0	Steady	0.0%	0.1%	30,503
Prohibition	0	Steady	0.0%	<0.1%	8,816
Socialist Labor	0	Steady	0.0%	<0.1%	8,097
Conservative	0	Steady	0.0%	<0.1%	3,444
Constitution	0	Steady	0.0%	<0.1%	2,953
Decency and Vigilance	0	Steady	0.0%	<0.1%	2,478
Taxation With Representation	0	Steady	0.0%	<0.1%	1,718
Unity for Justice	0	Steady	0.0%	<0.1%	1,221
Keep People Working	0	Steady	0.0%	<0.1%	782
The People's Friend	0	Steady	0.0%	<0.1%	580
Freedom Through Victory	0	Steady	0.0%	<0.1%	550
Socialist	0	Steady	0.0%	<0.1%	538
Independents for Economy	0	Steady	0.0%	<0.1%	409
Light a Candle	0	Steady	0.0%	<0.1%	336
Taxpayer's Only Friend	0	Steady	0.0%	<0.1%	277
Social Democratic	0	Steady	0.0%	<0.1%	268
Progress-Integrity-Economy	0	Steady	0.0%	<0.1%	103
Others	0	Steady	0.0%	0.1%	47,618
Totals	436 (Note: Increase is due to the admission of Alaska, whose seat was temporarily added to the usual 435, until reapportionment following 1960.)	▲1	100.0%	100.0%	45,718,994

Source: Election Statistics - Office of the Clerk

Popular vote
Democratic	56.00%
Republican	43.60%
Others	0.40%

House seats
Democratic	64.91%
Republican	35.09%

Results shaded according to winners share of the popular vote

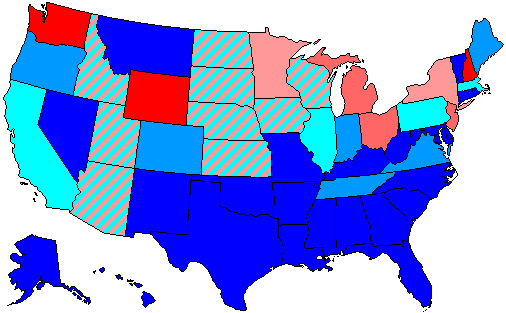
House seats by party holding plurality in state: 80+% Democratic / 80+% Republican; 60+ to 80% Democratic / 60+ to 80% Republican; Up to 60% Democratic / Up to 60% Republican

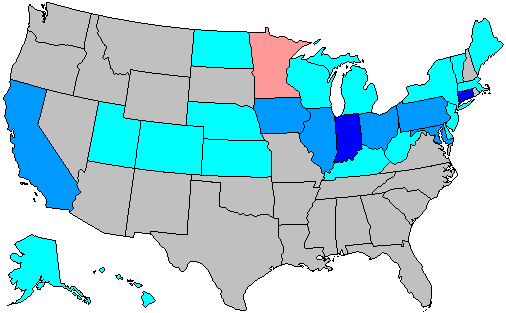
6+ Democratic gain / 6+ Republican gain; 3-5 Democratic gain / 3-5 Republican gain; 1-2 Democratic gain / 1-2 Republican gain; no net change

== Special elections ==
District	Incumbent			This race	
District	Member	Party	First elected	Results	Candidates
Georgia 7	Henderson L. Lanham	Democratic	1946	Incumbent died November 10, 1957. New member elected January 8, 1958. Democratic hold. Successor was subsequently re-elected in November.	▌ ✓ Harlan E. Mitchell (Democratic) 95.46%; ▌Howard I. Purdy (Republican) 2.66%; ▌H. M. King (Republican) 1.06%
New York 37	W. Sterling Cole	Republican	1934	Incumbent resigned December 1, 1957 to become the first Director of the IAEA. New member elected January 14, 1958. Republican hold. Winner was subsequently re-elected in November.	▌ ✓ Howard W. Robison (Republican) 59.8%; ▌Francis P. Hogan (Democratic) 40.2%
Pennsylvania 21	Augustine B. Kelley	Democratic	1940	Incumbent died November 20, 1957. New member elected January 21, 1958. Democratic hold. Successor was subsequently re-elected in November.	▌ ✓ John H. Dent (Democratic) 56.7%; ▌Herbert Morrison (Republican) 43.3%
Tennessee 8	Jere Cooper	Democratic	1928	Incumbent died December 18, 1957. New member elected February 1, 1958. Democratic hold. Successor was subsequently re-elected in November.	▌ ✓ Fats Everett (Democratic) 50.1%; ▌E. T. Palmer (Democratic) 31.2%; ▌Z. D. Atkins (Democratic) 18%
Minnesota 1	August H. Andresen	Republican	1924; 1932 (lost); 1934	Incumbent died January 14, 1958. New member elected February 18, 1958. Republican hold. Successor was subsequently re-elected in November.	▌ ✓ Al Quie (Republican) 50.3%; ▌Eugene P. Foley (Democratic) 49.7%
Pennsylvania 4	Earl Chudoff	Democratic	1948	Incumbent resigned January 5, 1958, after being elected judge of the Philadelphia Court of Common Pleas No. 1. New member elected May 20, 1958. Democratic hold. Successor was subsequently re-elected in November.	▌ ✓ Robert N. C. Nix Sr. (Democratic) 64.89%; ▌Cecil B. Moore (Republican) 35.11%

== Alabama ==
District	Incumbent			This race	
District	Member	Party	First elected	Results	Candidates
Alabama 1	Frank W. Boykin	Democratic	1935 (special)	Incumbent re-elected.	▌ ✓ Frank W. Boykin (Democratic); Uncontested
Alabama 2	George M. Grant	Democratic	1938	Incumbent re-elected.	▌ ✓ George M. Grant (Democratic); Uncontested
Alabama 3	George W. Andrews	Democratic	1944	Incumbent re-elected.	▌ ✓ George W. Andrews (Democratic); Uncontested
Alabama 4	Kenneth A. Roberts	Democratic	1950	Incumbent re-elected.	▌ ✓ Kenneth A. Roberts (Democratic); Uncontested
Alabama 5	Albert Rains	Democratic	1944	Incumbent re-elected.	▌ ✓ Albert Rains (Democratic); Uncontested
Alabama 6	Armistead I. Selden Jr.	Democratic	1952	Incumbent re-elected.	▌ ✓ Armistead I. Selden Jr. (Democratic); Uncontested
Alabama 7	Carl Elliott	Democratic	1948	Incumbent re-elected.	▌ ✓ Carl Elliott (Democratic); Uncontested
Alabama 8	Robert E. Jones Jr.	Democratic	1947 (special)	Incumbent re-elected.	▌ ✓ Robert E. Jones Jr. (Democratic); Uncontested
Alabama 9	George Huddleston Jr.	Democratic	1954	Incumbent re-elected.	▌ ✓ George Huddleston Jr. (Democratic) 86.3%; ▌Frank L. Mason (Republican) 13.7%

== Alaska ==
Borough Results

District	Incumbent			This race	
District	Member	Party	First elected	Results	Candidates
Alaska at-large	None (new district)			New seat. Democratic gain.	▌ ✓ Ralph Julian Rivers (Democratic) 57.5%; ▌Henry A. Benson (Republican) 42.5%

== Arizona ==
District	Incumbent			This race	
District	Member	Party	First elected	Results	Candidates
Arizona 1	John J. Rhodes	Republican	1952	Incumbent re-elected.	▌ ✓ John J. Rhodes (Republican) 59.2%; ▌Joe Haldiman Jr. (Democratic) 40.8%
Arizona 2	Stewart Udall	Democratic	1954	Incumbent re-elected.	▌ ✓ Stewart Udall (Democratic) 60.9%; ▌Jack Speiden (Republican) 39.1%

== Arkansas ==
District	Incumbent			This race	
District	Member	Party	First elected	Results	Candidates
Arkansas 1	Ezekiel C. Gathings	Democratic	1938	Incumbent re-elected.	▌ ✓ Ezekiel C. Gathings (Democratic); Uncontested
Arkansas 2	Wilbur Mills	Democratic	1938	Incumbent re-elected.	▌ ✓ Wilbur Mills (Democratic); Uncontested
Arkansas 3	James William Trimble	Democratic	1944	Incumbent re-elected.	▌ ✓ James William Trimble (Democratic); Uncontested
Arkansas 4	Oren Harris	Democratic	1940	Incumbent re-elected.	▌ ✓ Oren Harris (Democratic); Uncontested
Arkansas 5	Brooks Hays	Democratic	1942	Incumbent lost re-election. Democratic hold.	▌ ✓ Dale Alford (Dem./Write-in) 51.0%; ▌Brooks Hays (Democratic) 49.0%
Arkansas 6	William F. Norrell	Democratic	1938	Incumbent re-elected.	▌ ✓ William F. Norrell (Democratic); Uncontested

== California ==
District	Incumbent			This race	
District	Member	Party	First elected	Results	Candidates
California 1	Hubert B. Scudder	Republican	1948	Incumbent retired. Democratic gain.	▌ ✓ Clem Miller (Democratic) 54.9%; ▌Frederick G. Dupuis (Republican) 45.1%
California 2	Clair Engle	Democratic	1943 (special)	Incumbent retired to run for U.S. senator. Democratic hold.	▌ ✓ Harold T. Johnson (Democratic) 61.0%; ▌Curtis W. Tarr (Republican) 39.0%
California 3	John E. Moss	Democratic	1952	Incumbent re-elected.	▌ ✓ John E. Moss (Democratic); Uncontested
California 4	William S. Mailliard	Republican	1952	Incumbent re-elected.	▌ ✓ William S. Mailliard (Republican) 60.0%; ▌George D. Collins Jr. (Democratic) 40.0%
California 5	John F. Shelley	Democratic	1949 (special)	Incumbent re-elected.	▌ ✓ John F. Shelley (Democratic); Uncontested
California 6	John F. Baldwin Jr.	Republican	1954	Incumbent re-elected.	▌ ✓ John F. Baldwin Jr. (Republican) 51.0%; ▌Howard H. Jewel (Democratic) 49.0%
California 7	John J. Allen Jr.	Republican	1946	Incumbent lost re-election. Democratic gain.	▌ ✓ Jeffery Cohelan (Democratic) 50.9%; ▌John J. Allen Jr. (Republican) 49.1%
California 8	George P. Miller	Democratic	1944	Incumbent re-elected.	▌ ✓ George P. Miller (Democratic); Uncontested
California 9	J. Arthur Younger	Republican	1952	Incumbent re-elected.	▌ ✓ J. Arthur Younger (Republican) 58.8%; ▌Elma D. Oddstad (Democratic) 41.2%
California 10	Charles Gubser	Republican	1952	Incumbent re-elected.	▌ ✓ Charles Gubser (Republican) 54.6%; ▌Russell B. Bryan (Democratic) 45.4%
California 11	John J. McFall	Democratic	1956	Incumbent re-elected.	▌ ✓ John J. McFall (Democratic) 69.3%; ▌Frederick S. Van Dyke (Republican) 30.7%
California 12	B. F. Sisk	Democratic	1954	Incumbent re-elected.	▌ ✓ B. F. Sisk (Democratic) 81.1%; ▌Daniel K. Halpin (Republican) 18.9%
California 13	Charles M. Teague	Republican	1954	Incumbent re-elected.	▌ ✓ Charles M. Teague (Republican) 57.0%; ▌William Kirk Stewart (Democratic) 43.0%
California 14	Harlan Hagen	Democratic	1952	Incumbent re-elected.	▌ ✓ Harlan Hagen (Democratic); Uncontested
California 15	Gordon L. McDonough	Republican	1944	Incumbent re-elected.	▌ ✓ Gordon L. McDonough (Republican) 52.0%; ▌Emery S. Petty (Democratic) 48.0%
California 16	Donald L. Jackson	Republican	1946	Incumbent re-elected.	▌ ✓ Donald L. Jackson (Republican) 57.8%; ▌Melvin Lennard (Democratic) 42.2%
California 17	Cecil R. King	Democratic	1942	Incumbent re-elected.	▌ ✓ Cecil R. King (Democratic) 75.3%; ▌Leonard Di Miceli (Republican) 24.7%
California 18	Craig Hosmer	Republican	1952	Incumbent re-elected.	▌ ✓ Craig Hosmer (Republican) 60.0%; ▌Harry S. May (Democratic) 40.0%
California 19	Chet Holifield	Democratic	1942	Incumbent re-elected.	▌ ✓ Chet Holifield (Democratic) 83.4%; ▌Harry Vincent Leppek (Republican) 16.6%
California 20	H. Allen Smith	Republican	1956	Incumbent re-elected.	▌ ✓ H. Allen Smith (Republican) 66.0%; ▌Raymond Robert Farrell (Democratic) 34.0%
California 21	Edgar W. Hiestand	Republican	1952	Incumbent re-elected.	▌ ✓ Edgar W. Hiestand (Republican) 51.9%; ▌Rudd Brown (Democratic) 48.1%
California 22	Joseph F. Holt	Republican	1952	Incumbent re-elected.	▌ ✓ Joseph F. Holt (Republican) 55.4%; ▌Irving Glasband (Democratic) 44.6%
California 23	Clyde Doyle	Democratic	1948	Incumbent re-elected.	▌ ✓ Clyde Doyle (Democratic); Uncontested
California 24	Glenard P. Lipscomb	Republican	1953 (special)	Incumbent re-elected.	▌ ✓ Glenard P. Lipscomb (Republican) 56.4%; ▌William H. Ware Jr. (Democratic) 43.6%
California 25	Patrick J. Hillings	Republican	1950	Incumbent retired to run for Attorney General of California. Democratic gain.	▌ ✓ George A. Kasem (Democratic) 50.1%; ▌Prescott O. Lieberg (Republican) 49.9%
California 26	James Roosevelt	Democratic	1954	Incumbent re-elected.	▌ ✓ James Roosevelt (Democratic) 72.2%; ▌Crispus Wright (Republican) 27.8%
California 27	Harry R. Sheppard	Democratic	1936	Incumbent re-elected.	▌ ✓ Harry R. Sheppard (Democratic) 72.3%; ▌Robert M. Castle (Republican) 27.7%
California 28	James B. Utt	Republican	1952	Incumbent re-elected.	▌ ✓ James B. Utt (Republican) 58.2%; ▌T. R. Boyett (Democratic) 41.8%
California 29	Dalip Singh Saund	Democratic	1956	Incumbent re-elected.	▌ ✓ Dalip Singh Saund (Democratic) 62.4%; ▌John Babbage (Republican) 37.6%
California 30	Bob Wilson	Republican	1952	Incumbent re-elected.	▌ ✓ Bob Wilson (Republican) 55.3%; ▌Lionel Van Deerlin (Democratic) 44.7%

== Colorado ==
District	Incumbent			This race	
District	Member	Party	First elected	Results	Candidates
Colorado 1	Byron G. Rogers	Democratic	1950	Incumbent re-elected.	▌ ✓ Byron G. Rogers (Democratic) 66.7%; ▌John J. Harpel (Republican) 33.3%
Colorado 2	William S. Hill	Republican	1940	Incumbent retired. Democratic gain.	▌ ✓ Byron L. Johnson (Democratic) 54.2%; ▌John G. Mackie (Republican) 45.8%
Colorado 3	John Chenoweth	Republican	1950	Incumbent re-elected.	▌ ✓ John Chenoweth (Republican) 50.2%; ▌Fred M. Betz (Democratic) 49.8%
Colorado 4	Wayne N. Aspinall	Democratic	1948	Incumbent re-elected.	▌ ✓ Wayne N. Aspinall (Democratic) 63.6%; ▌J. R. Wells (Republican) 36.4%

== Connecticut ==
District	Incumbent			This race	
District	Member	Party	First elected	Results	Candidates
Connecticut 1	Edwin H. May Jr.	Republican	1956	Incumbent lost re-election. Democratic gain.	▌ ✓ Emilio Q. Daddario (Democratic) 54.3%; ▌Edwin H. May Jr. (Republican) 45.7%
Connecticut 2	Horace Seely-Brown Jr.	Republican	1950	Incumbent lost re-election. Democratic gain.	▌ ✓ Chester B. Bowles (Democratic) 53.3%; ▌Horace Seely-Brown Jr. (Republican) 46.7%
Connecticut 3	Albert W. Cretella	Republican	1952	Incumbent lost re-election. Democratic gain.	▌ ✓ Robert Giaimo (Democratic) 56.2%; ▌Albert W. Cretella (Republican) 43.8%
Connecticut 4	Albert P. Morano	Republican	1950	Incumbent lost re-election. Democratic gain.	▌ ✓ Donald J. Irwin (Democratic) 50.9%; ▌Albert P. Morano (Republican) 49.1%
Connecticut 5	James T. Patterson	Republican	1946	Incumbent lost re-election. Democratic gain.	▌ ✓ John S. Monagan (Democratic) 53.8%; ▌James T. Patterson (Republican) 46.2%
Connecticut at-large	Antoni Sadlak	Republican	1946	Incumbent lost re-election. Democratic gain.	▌ ✓ Frank Kowalski (Democratic) 56.0%; ▌Antoni Sadlak (Republican) 44.0%

== Delaware ==
District	Incumbent			This race	
District	Member	Party	First elected	Results	Candidates
Delaware at-large	Hal Haskell	Republican	1956	Incumbent lost re-election. Democratic gain.	▌ ✓ Harris McDowell (Democratic) 50.2%; ▌Hal Haskell (Republican) 49.8%

== Florida ==
District	Incumbent			This race	
District	Member	Party	First elected	Results	Candidates
Florida 1	William C. Cramer	Republican	1954	Incumbent re-elected.	▌ ✓ William C. Cramer (Republican) 58.8%; ▌Winton H. King (Democratic) 41.2%
Florida 2	Charles E. Bennett	Democratic	1948	Incumbent re-elected.	▌ ✓ Charles E. Bennett (Democratic); Uncontested
Florida 3	Bob Sikes	Democratic	1940; 1944 (resigned); 1944	Incumbent re-elected.	▌ ✓ Bob Sikes (Democratic); Uncontested
Florida 4	Dante Fascell	Democratic	1954	Incumbent re-elected.	▌ ✓ Dante Fascell (Democratic); Uncontested
Florida 5	Syd Herlong	Democratic	1948	Incumbent re-elected.	▌ ✓ Syd Herlong (Democratic) 67.0%; ▌William C. Coleman Jr. (Republican) 33.0%
Florida 6	Paul Rogers	Democratic	1954	Incumbent re-elected.	▌ ✓ Paul Rogers (Democratic) 71.5%; ▌Charles P. Ware (Republican) 28.5%
Florida 7	James A. Haley	Democratic	1952	Incumbent re-elected.	▌ ✓ James A. Haley (Democratic); Uncontested
Florida 8	Donald Ray Matthews	Democratic	1952	Incumbent re-elected.	▌ ✓ Donald Ray Matthews (Democratic); Uncontested

== Georgia ==
District	Incumbent			This race	
District	Member	Party	First elected	Results	Candidates
Georgia 1	Prince Hulon Preston Jr.	Democratic	1946	Incumbent re-elected.	▌ ✓ Prince Hulon Preston Jr. (Democratic); Uncontested
Georgia 2	J. L. Pilcher	Democratic	1953 (special)	Incumbent re-elected.	▌ ✓ J. L. Pilcher (Democratic); Uncontested
Georgia 3	Tic Forrester	Democratic	1950	Incumbent re-elected.	▌ ✓ Tic Forrester (Democratic); Uncontested
Georgia 4	John Flynt	Democratic	1954	Incumbent re-elected.	▌ ✓ John Flynt (Democratic); Uncontested
Georgia 5	James C. Davis	Democratic	1946	Incumbent re-elected.	▌ ✓ James C. Davis (Democratic); Uncontested
Georgia 6	Carl Vinson	Democratic	1914	Incumbent re-elected.	▌ ✓ Carl Vinson (Democratic); Uncontested
Georgia 7	Harlan Mitchell	Democratic	1958	Incumbent re-elected.	▌ ✓ Harlan Mitchell (Democratic); Uncontested
Georgia 8	Iris Faircloth Blitch	Democratic	1954	Incumbent re-elected.	▌ ✓ Iris Faircloth Blitch (Democratic); Uncontested
Georgia 9	Phillip M. Landrum	Democratic	1952	Incumbent re-elected.	▌ ✓ Phillip M. Landrum (Democratic); Uncontested
Georgia 10	Paul Brown	Democratic	1933 (special)	Incumbent re-elected.	▌ ✓ Paul Brown (Democratic); Uncontested

== Idaho ==
District	Incumbent			This race	
District	Member	Party	First elected	Results	Candidates
Idaho 1	Gracie Pfost	Democratic	1952	Incumbent re-elected.	▌ ✓ Gracie Pfost (Democratic) 62.4%; ▌A. B. Curtis (Republican) 37.6%
Idaho 2	Hamer H. Budge	Republican	1950	Incumbent re-elected.	▌ ✓ Hamer H. Budge (Republican) 55.0%; ▌Tim Brennan (Democratic) 45.0%

== Illinois ==
District	Incumbent			This race	
District	Member	Party	First elected	Results	Candidates
Illinois 1	William L. Dawson	Democratic	1942	Incumbent re-elected.	▌ ✓ William L. Dawson (Democratic) 72.2%; ▌T. R. M. Howard (Republican) 27.8%
Illinois 2	Barratt O'Hara	Democratic	1948; 1950 (lost); 1952	Incumbent re-elected.	▌ ✓ Barratt O'Hara (Democratic) 68.9%; ▌Harold E. Marks (Republican) 31.1%
Illinois 3	Emmet F. Byrne	Republican	1956	Incumbent lost re-election. Democratic gain.	▌ ✓ William T. Murphy (Democratic) 59.0%; ▌Emmet Byrne (Republican) 41.0%
Illinois 4	Vacant			William E. McVey (R) died August 10, 1958. Republican hold.	▌ ✓ Ed Derwinski (Republican) 52.0%; ▌Leland H. Rayson (Democratic) 48.0%
Illinois 5	John C. Kluczynski	Democratic	1950	Incumbent re-elected.	▌ ✓ John C. Kluczynski (Democratic) 76.1%; ▌Theodore Wozniak (Republican) 23.9%
Illinois 6	Thomas J. O'Brien	Democratic	1942	Incumbent re-elected.	▌ ✓ Thomas J. O'Brien (Democratic) 73.1%; ▌Frank S. Estes (Republican) 26.9%
Illinois 7	Roland V. Libonati	Democratic	1957 (special)	Incumbent re-elected.	▌ ✓ Roland V. Libonati (Democratic) 83.0%; ▌Anthony C. Catena (Republican) 17.0%
Illinois 8	Thomas S. Gordon	Democratic	1942	Incumbent retired. Democratic hold.	▌ ✓ Dan Rostenkowski (Democratic) 74.6%; ▌William F. H. Schmidt (Republican) 25.4%
Illinois 9	Sidney R. Yates	Democratic	1948	Incumbent re-elected.	▌ ✓ Sidney R. Yates (Democratic) 67.0%; ▌Homer P. Hargrave Jr. (Republican) 33.0%
Illinois 10	Harold R. Collier	Republican	1956	Incumbent re-elected.	▌ ✓ Harold R. Collier (Republican) 54.3%; ▌William J. McGah Jr. (Democratic) 45.7%
Illinois 11	Timothy P. Sheehan	Republican	1950	Incumbent lost re-election. Democratic gain.	▌ ✓ Roman Pucinski (Democratic) 56.7%; ▌Timothy P. Sheehan (Republican) 43.3%
Illinois 12	Charles A. Boyle	Democratic	1954	Incumbent re-elected.	▌ ✓ Charles A. Boyle (Democratic) 60.8%; ▌Allen A. Freeman (Republican) 39.2%
Illinois 13	Marguerite S. Church	Republican	1950	Incumbent re-elected.	▌ ✓ Marguerite S. Church (Republican) 67.1%; ▌Laurence A. Kusek (Democratic) 32.9%
Illinois 14	Vacant			Russell W. Keeney (R) died January 11, 1958. Republican hold.	▌ ✓ Elmer J. Hoffman (Republican) 64.3%; ▌Peter J. Fiefer (Democratic) 35.7%
Illinois 15	Noah M. Mason	Republican	1936	Incumbent re-elected.	▌ ✓ Noah M. Mason (Republican) 52.5%; ▌Dorothy G. O'Brien (Democratic) 47.5%
Illinois 16	Leo E. Allen	Republican	1932	Incumbent re-elected.	▌ ✓ Leo E. Allen (Republican) 61.4%; ▌Milton A. Lundstrom (Democratic) 38.6%
Illinois 17	Leslie C. Arends	Republican	1934	Incumbent re-elected.	▌ ✓ Leslie C. Arends (Republican) 61.0%; ▌William T. Larkin (Democratic) 39.0%
Illinois 18	Robert H. Michel	Republican	1956	Incumbent re-elected.	▌ ✓ Robert H. Michel (Republican) 59.5%; ▌James W. McGee (Democratic) 40.5%
Illinois 19	Robert B. Chiperfield	Republican	1938	Incumbent re-elected.	▌ ✓ Robert B. Chiperfield (Republican) 50.5%; ▌John C. Watson (Democratic) 49.5%
Illinois 20	Vacant			Sid Simpson (R) died October 26, 1958. Republican hold.	▌ ✓ Edna O. Simpson (Republican) 55.5%; ▌Henry W. Pollock (Democratic) 44.5%
Illinois 21	Peter F. Mack Jr.	Democratic	1948	Incumbent re-elected.	▌ ✓ Peter F. Mack Jr. (Democratic) 58.8%; ▌Norma Eaton (Republican) 41.2%
Illinois 22	William L. Springer	Republican	1950	Incumbent re-elected.	▌ ✓ William L. Springer (Republican) 60.5%; ▌Carlton H. Myers (Democratic) 39.5%
Illinois 23	Charles W. Vursell	Republican	1942	Incumbent lost re-election. Democratic gain.	▌ ✓ George E. Shipley (Democratic) 50.1%; ▌Charles W. Vursell (Republican) 49.9%
Illinois 24	Melvin Price	Democratic	1944	Incumbent re-elected.	▌ ✓ Melvin Price (Democratic) 76.1%; ▌Alex Chouinard (Republican) 23.9%
Illinois 25	Kenneth J. Gray	Democratic	1954	Incumbent re-elected.	▌ ✓ Kenneth J. Gray (Democratic) 58.2%; ▌Carl D. Sneed (Republican) 41.8%

== Indiana ==
District	Incumbent			This race	
District	Member	Party	First elected	Results	Candidates
Indiana 1	Ray Madden	Democratic	1942	Incumbent re-elected.	▌ ✓ Ray Madden (Democratic) 66.4%; ▌Edward P. Keck (Republican) 33.0%; ▌Harry C. Beamer (Prohibition) 0.6%
Indiana 2	Charles A. Halleck	Republican	1935 (special)	Incumbent re-elected.	▌ ✓ Charles A. Halleck (Republican) 52.2%; ▌George H. Bowers (Democratic) 47.8%
Indiana 3	F. Jay Nimtz	Republican	1956	Incumbent lost re-election. Democratic gain.	▌ ✓ John Brademas (Democratic) 56.9%; ▌F. Jay Nimtz (Republican) 43.1%
Indiana 4	E. Ross Adair	Republican	1950	Incumbent re-elected.	▌ ✓ E. Ross Adair (Republican) 50.1%; ▌W. Robert Fleming (Democratic) 49.9%
Indiana 5	John V. Beamer	Republican	1950	Incumbent lost re-election. Democratic gain.	▌ ✓ J. Edward Roush (Democratic) 53.7%; ▌John V. Beamer (Republican) 46.3%
Indiana 6	Cecil M. Harden	Republican	1948	Incumbent lost re-election. Democratic gain.	▌ ✓ Fred Wampler (Democratic) 51.5%; ▌Cecil M. Harden (Republican) 48.5%
Indiana 7	William G. Bray	Republican	1950	Incumbent re-elected.	▌ ✓ William G. Bray (Republican) 53.8%; ▌Thomas L. Lemon (Democratic) 46.2%
Indiana 8	Winfield K. Denton	Democratic	1954	Incumbent re-elected.	▌ ✓ Winfield K. Denton (Democratic) 61.5%; ▌Franklin E. Katterjohn (Republican) 38.5%
Indiana 9	Earl Wilson	Republican	1940	Incumbent lost re-election. Democratic gain.	▌ ✓ Earl Hogan (Democratic) 50.4%; ▌Earl Wilson (Republican) 49.6%
Indiana 10	Ralph Harvey	Republican	1947 (special)	Incumbent lost re-election. Democratic gain.	▌ ✓ Randall S. Harmon (Democratic) 50.7%; ▌Ralph Harvey (Republican) 49.3%
Indiana 11	Charles B. Brownson	Republican	1950	Incumbent lost re-election. Democratic gain.	▌ ✓ Joseph W. Barr (Democratic) 52.1%; ▌Charles B. Brownson (Republican) 47.9%

== Iowa ==
District	Incumbent			This race	
District	Member	Party	First elected	Results	Candidates
Iowa 1	Fred Schwengel	Republican	1954	Incumbent re-elected.	▌ ✓ Fred Schwengel (Republican) 53.4%; ▌Thomas J. Gailey (Democratic) 46.6%
Iowa 2	Henry O. Talle	Republican	1938	Incumbent lost re-election. Democratic gain.	▌ ✓ Leonard G. Wolf (Democratic) 51.1%; ▌Henry O. Talle (Republican) 48.9%
Iowa 3	H. R. Gross	Republican	1948	Incumbent re-elected.	▌ ✓ H. R. Gross (Republican) 53.7%; ▌Michael Micich (Democratic) 46.3%
Iowa 4	Karl M. LeCompte	Republican	1938	Incumbent retired. Democratic gain.	▌ ✓ Steven V. Carter (Democratic) 52.0%; ▌John Kyl (Republican) 48.0%
Iowa 5	Paul Cunningham	Republican	1940	Incumbent lost re-election. Democratic gain.	▌ ✓ Neal Smith (Democratic) 52.3%; ▌Paul Cunningham (Republican) 47.7%
Iowa 6	Merwin Coad	Democratic	1956	Incumbent re-elected.	▌ ✓ Merwin Coad (Democratic) 58.3%; ▌Robert E. Waggoner (Republican) 41.7%
Iowa 7	Ben F. Jensen	Republican	1938	Incumbent re-elected.	▌ ✓ Ben F. Jensen (Republican) 51.5%; ▌Ellsworth O. Hayes (Democratic) 48.5%
Iowa 8	Charles B. Hoeven	Republican	1942	Incumbent re-elected.	▌ ✓ Charles B. Hoeven (Republican) 52.7%; ▌Donald E. O'Brien (Democratic) 47.3%

== Kansas ==
District	Incumbent			This race	
District	Member	Party	First elected	Results	Candidates
Kansas 1	William H. Avery	Republican	1954	Incumbent re-elected.	▌ ✓ William H. Avery (Republican) 51.2%; ▌Robert W. Domme (Democratic) 47.4%; ▌Marie I. Hadin (Prohibition) 1.3%
Kansas 2	Errett P. Scrivner	Republican	1943 (special)	Incumbent lost re-election. Democratic gain.	▌ ✓ Newell A. George (Democratic) 50.8%; ▌Errett P. Scrivner (Republican) 49.2%
Kansas 3	Myron V. George	Republican	1950	Incumbent lost re-election. Democratic gain.	▌ ✓ Denver D. Hargis (Democratic) 51.7%; ▌Myron V. George (Republican) 48.3%
Kansas 4	Edward Herbert Rees	Republican	1936	Incumbent re-elected.	▌ ✓ Edward Herbert Rees (Republican) 50.7%; ▌Warner Moore (Democratic) 49.3%
Kansas 5	J. Floyd Breeding	Democratic	1956	Incumbent re-elected.	▌ ✓ J. Floyd Breeding (Democratic) 53.1%; ▌Clifford R. Hope Jr. (Republican) 46.9%
Kansas 6	Wint Smith	Republican	1946	Incumbent re-elected.	▌ ✓ Wint Smith (Republican) 49.2%; ▌Elmo J. Mahoney (Democratic) 49.0%; ▌John C. Jones (Prohibition) 1.8%

== Kentucky ==
District	Incumbent			This race	
District	Member	Party	First elected	Results	Candidates
Kentucky 1	Noble Jones Gregory	Democratic	1936	Incumbent lost renomination. Democratic hold.	▌ ✓ Frank Stubblefield (Democratic) 85.0%; ▌James G. Bandy (Republican) 15.0%
Kentucky 2	William Natcher	Democratic	1953 (special)	Incumbent re-elected.	▌ ✓ William Natcher (Democratic) 76.1%; ▌Wayland Render (Republican) 23.9%
Kentucky 3	John M. Robsion Jr.	Republican	1952	Incumbent lost re-election. Democratic gain.	▌ ✓ Frank W. Burke (Democratic) 52.2%; ▌John M. Robsion Jr. (Republican) 47.8%
Kentucky 4	Frank Chelf	Democratic	1944	Incumbent re-elected.	▌ ✓ Frank Chelf (Democratic); Uncontested
Kentucky 5	Brent Spence	Democratic	1930	Incumbent re-elected.	▌ ✓ Brent Spence (Democratic) 71.9%; ▌Jule Appel (Republican) 28.1%
Kentucky 6	John C. Watts	Democratic	1951	Incumbent re-elected.	▌ ✓ John C. Watts (Democratic) 94.7%; ▌Wallace Jones (Write-in) 5.3%
Kentucky 7	Carl D. Perkins	Democratic	1948	Incumbent re-elected.	▌ ✓ Carl D. Perkins (Democratic) 65.8%; ▌E. L. Raybourn (Republican) 34.2%
Kentucky 8	Eugene Siler	Republican	1954	Incumbent re-elected.	▌ ✓ Eugene Siler (Republican) 68.0%; ▌W. D. Scalf (Democratic) 32.0%

== Louisiana ==
District	Incumbent			This race	
District	Member	Party	First elected	Results	Candidates
Louisiana 1	F. Edward Hébert	Democratic	1940	Incumbent re-elected.	▌ ✓ F. Edward Hébert (Democratic) 100.0%; ▌Maurice Eugen Clark (Independent) 0.002%
Louisiana 2	Hale Boggs	Democratic	1940; 1942 (lost); 1946	Incumbent re-elected.	▌ ✓ Hale Boggs (Democratic) 91.8%; ▌John Patrick Conway (Republican) 8.2%
Louisiana 3	Edwin E. Willis	Democratic	1948	Incumbent re-elected.	▌ ✓ Edwin E. Willis (Democratic); Uncontested
Louisiana 4	Overton Brooks	Democratic	1936	Incumbent re-elected.	▌ ✓ Overton Brooks (Democratic); Uncontested
Louisiana 5	Otto Passman	Democratic	1946	Incumbent re-elected.	▌ ✓ Otto Passman (Democratic); Uncontested
Louisiana 6	James H. Morrison	Democratic	1942	Incumbent re-elected.	▌ ✓ James H. Morrison (Democratic); Uncontested
Louisiana 7	T. Ashton Thompson	Democratic	1952	Incumbent re-elected.	▌ ✓ T. Ashton Thompson (Democratic); Uncontested
Louisiana 8	Vacant			George S. Long (D) died March 22, 1958. Democratic hold.	▌ ✓ Harold B. McSween (Democratic); Uncontested

== Maine ==
District	Incumbent			This race	
District	Member	Party	First elected	Results	Candidates
Maine 1	Robert Hale	Republican	1942	Incumbent lost re-election. Democratic gain.	▌ ✓ James C. Oliver (Democratic) 52.1%; ▌Robert Hale (Republican) 47.9%
Maine 2	Frank M. Coffin	Democratic	1956	Incumbent re-elected.	▌ ✓ Frank M. Coffin (Democratic) 61.2%; ▌Neil Bishop (Republican) 38.8%
Maine 3	Clifford McIntire	Republican	1951 (special)	Incumbent re-elected.	▌ ✓ Clifford McIntire (Republican) 55.9%; ▌Gerald J. Grady (Democratic) 44.1%

== Maryland ==
District	Incumbent			This race	
District	Member	Party	First elected	Results	Candidates
Maryland 1	Edward T. Miller	Republican	1946	Incumbent lost re-election. Democratic gain.	▌ ✓ Thomas F. Johnson (Democratic) 50.6%; ▌Edward T. Miller (Republican) 49.4%
Maryland 2	James Devereux	Republican	1950	Incumbent retired to run for Governor of Maryland. Democratic gain.	▌ ✓ Daniel Brewster (Democratic) 61.0%; ▌Fife Symington (Republican) 39.0%
Maryland 3	Edward Garmatz	Democratic	1947 (special)	Incumbent re-elected.	▌ ✓ Edward Garmatz (Democratic) 84.0%; ▌Harry Kemper (Republican) 16.0%
Maryland 4	George Fallon	Democratic	1944	Incumbent re-elected.	▌ ✓ George Fallon (Democratic) 71.6%; ▌Louis W. Collier (Republican) 28.4%
Maryland 5	Richard Lankford	Democratic	1954	Incumbent re-elected.	▌ ✓ Richard Lankford (Democratic) 75.1%; ▌Robert E. Ennis (Republican) 24.9%
Maryland 6	DeWitt Hyde	Republican	1952	Incumbent lost re-election. Democratic gain.	▌ ✓ John R. Foley (Democratic) 51.4%; ▌DeWitt Hyde (Republican) 48.6%
Maryland 7	Samuel Friedel	Democratic	1952	Incumbent re-elected.	▌ ✓ Samuel Friedel (Democratic) 73.5%; ▌Elizabeth P. Brown (Republican) 26.5%

== Massachusetts ==
District	Incumbent			This race	
District	Member	Party	First elected	Results	Candidates
Massachusetts 1	John W. Heselton	Republican	1944	Incumbent retired. Republican hold.	▌ ✓ Silvio O. Conte (Republican) 55.3%; ▌James M. Burns (Democratic) 44.2%; ▌Louise Stone Wilson (Prohibition) 0.5%
Massachusetts 2	Edward Boland	Democratic	1952	Incumbent re-elected.	▌ ✓ Edward Boland (Democratic); Uncontested
Massachusetts 3	Philip J. Philbin	Democratic	1942	Incumbent re-elected.	▌ ✓ Philip J. Philbin (Democratic); Uncontested
Massachusetts 4	Harold Donohue	Democratic	1946	Incumbent re-elected.	▌ ✓ Harold Donohue (Democratic) 63.8%; ▌Charles D. Briggs Jr. (Republican) 36.2%
Massachusetts 5	Edith Nourse Rogers	Republican	1925 (special)	Incumbent re-elected.	▌ ✓ Edith Nourse Rogers (Republican) 66.0%; ▌William H. Sullivan (Democratic) 34.0%
Massachusetts 6	William H. Bates	Republican	1950	Incumbent re-elected.	▌ ✓ William H. Bates (Republican); Uncontested
Massachusetts 7	Thomas J. Lane	Democratic	1941 (special)	Incumbent re-elected.	▌ ✓ Thomas J. Lane (Democratic) 75.6%; ▌Robert T. Breed (Republican) 24.4%
Massachusetts 8	Torbert Macdonald	Democratic	1954	Incumbent re-elected.	▌ ✓ Torbert Macdonald (Democratic) 66.4%; ▌Gordon F. Hughes (Republican) 33.6%
Massachusetts 9	Donald W. Nicholson	Republican	1947 (special)	Incumbent retired. Republican hold.	▌ ✓ Hastings Keith (Republican) 54.7%; ▌John Almeida Jr. (Democratic) 45.3%
Massachusetts 10	Laurence Curtis	Republican	1952	Incumbent re-elected.	▌ ✓ Laurence Curtis (Republican) 52.2%; ▌John L. Saltonstall Jr. (Democratic) 47.8%
Massachusetts 11	Tip O'Neill	Democratic	1952	Incumbent re-elected.	▌ ✓ Tip O'Neill (Democratic) 80.4%; ▌Elliott H. Stone (Republican) 19.6%
Massachusetts 12	John W. McCormack	Democratic	1928	Incumbent re-elected.	▌ ✓ John W. McCormack (Democratic); Uncontested
Massachusetts 13	Richard B. Wigglesworth	Republican	1928	Incumbent retired. Democratic gain.	▌ ✓ James A. Burke (Democratic) 53.5%; ▌William W. Jenness (Republican) 46.5%
Massachusetts 14	Joseph W. Martin Jr.	Republican	1924	Incumbent re-elected.	▌ ✓ Joseph W. Martin Jr. (Republican) 61.0%; ▌Edward F. Doolan (Democratic) 39.0%

== Michigan ==
District	Incumbent			This race	
District	Member	Party	First elected	Results	Candidates
Michigan 1	Thaddeus M. Machrowicz	Democratic	1950	Incumbent re-elected.	▌ ✓ Thaddeus M. Machrowicz (Democratic) 90.4%; ▌Walter Czarnecki (Republican) 9.3%; ▌William Sablich (Socialist Labor) 0.3%
Michigan 2	George Meader	Republican	1950	Incumbent re-elected.	▌ ✓ George Meader (Republican) 58.8%; ▌Robert G. Hall (Democratic) 40.8%; ▌Archie Woodhurst (Prohibition) 0.2%; ▌Edmund T. Taylor (Socialist Labor) 0.1%
Michigan 3	August E. Johansen	Republican	1954	Incumbent re-elected.	▌ ✓ August E. Johansen (Republican) 60.4%; ▌John R. O'Meara (Democratic) 39.2%; ▌Floyd R. Latta (Prohibition) 0.4%
Michigan 4	Clare Hoffman	Republican	1934	Incumbent re-elected.	▌ ✓ Clare Hoffman (Republican) 59.8%; ▌Gordon A. Elferdink (Democratic) 39.8%; ▌Junius B. Johnson (Prohibition) 0.3%
Michigan 5	Gerald Ford	Republican	1948	Incumbent re-elected.	▌ ✓ Gerald Ford (Republican) 63.6%; ▌Richard F. Vander Veen (Democratic) 36.2%; ▌Bernard Elve (Prohibition) 0.1%
Michigan 6	Charles E. Chamberlain	Republican	1956	Incumbent re-elected.	▌ ✓ Charles E. Chamberlain (Republican) 52.1%; ▌Donald Hayworth (Democratic) 47.7%; ▌Ernest H. Gorton (Prohibition) 0.2%
Michigan 7	Robert J. McIntosh	Republican	1956	Incumbent lost re-election. Democratic gain.	▌ ✓ James G. O'Hara (Democratic) 50.7%; ▌Robert J. McIntosh (Republican) 49.1%; ▌Clarence E. Smith (Prohibition) 0.1%; ▌Theos A. Grove (Socialist Labor) 0.1%
Michigan 8	Alvin Morell Bentley	Republican	1952	Incumbent re-elected.	▌ ✓ Alvin Morell Bentley (Republican) 62.2%; ▌James O. Pino (Democratic) 37.8%
Michigan 9	Robert P. Griffin	Republican	1956	Incumbent re-elected.	▌ ✓ Robert P. Griffin (Republican) 56.7%; ▌Jan B. Vanderploeg (Democratic) 43.1%; ▌Glenn A. Root (Prohibition) 0.2%
Michigan 10	Al Cederberg	Republican	1952	Incumbent re-elected.	▌ ✓ Al Cederberg (Republican) 61.1%; ▌Daniel E. Reed (Democratic) 38.7%; ▌Mildred Montgomery (Prohibition) 0.2%
Michigan 11	Victor A. Knox	Republican	1952	Incumbent re-elected.	▌ ✓ Victor A. Knox (Republican) 52.2%; ▌Prentiss M. Brown Jr. (Democratic) 47.6%; ▌Carl E. Ruble (Prohibition) 0.1%
Michigan 12	John B. Bennett	Republican	1946	Incumbent re-elected.	▌ ✓ John B. Bennett (Republican) 57.0%; ▌Joseph S. Mack (Democratic) 42.9%; ▌Harold Lindahl (Prohibition) 0.08%
Michigan 13	Charles Diggs	Democratic	1954	Incumbent re-elected.	▌ ✓ Charles Diggs (Democratic) 72.7%; ▌Charles P. White (Republican) 27.0%; ▌Peter Goonis (Socialist Labor) 0.3%
Michigan 14	Louis C. Rabaut	Democratic	1948	Incumbent re-elected.	▌ ✓ Louis C. Rabaut (Democratic) 64.2%; ▌Lois V. Nair (Republican) 35.7%; ▌Ruth V. Harrett (Prohibition) 0.1%
Michigan 15	John Dingell	Democratic	1955 (special)	Incumbent re-elected.	▌ ✓ John Dingell (Democratic) 78.5%; ▌Austin W. Curtis Jr. (Republican) 21.2%; ▌Charles Aranoff (Socialist Labor) 0.2%; ▌Estelle Tripp (Prohibition) 0.10%
Michigan 16	John Lesinski Jr.	Democratic	1932	Incumbent re-elected.	▌ ✓ John Lesinski Jr. (Democratic) 71.8%; ▌Ralph B. Guy (Republican) 27.8%; ▌Genevieve Connolly (Socialist Labor) 0.2%; ▌Earl A. Johnson (Prohibition) 0.2%
Michigan 17	Martha Griffiths	Democratic	1954	Incumbent re-elected.	▌ ✓ Martha Griffiths (Democratic) 60.3%; ▌Lucas S. Miel (Republican) 39.5%; ▌Theodore Gramaticoff (Socialist Labor) 0.1%; ▌Harold D. Rhodes (Prohibition) 0.1%
Michigan 18	William Broomfield	Republican	1956	Incumbent re-elected.	▌ ✓ William Broomfield (Republican) 52.6%; ▌Leslie H. Hudson (Democratic) 47.1%; ▌W. Clifford Bentley (Socialist Labor) 0.2%; ▌Phillip Kile (Prohibition) 0.1%

== Minnesota ==
District	Incumbent			This race	
District	Member	Party	First elected	Results	Candidates
Minnesota 1	Al Quie	Republican	1958	Incumbent re-elected.	▌ ✓ Al Quie (Republican) 56.9%; ▌Eugene P. Foley (DFL) 43.1%
Minnesota 2	Joseph P. O'Hara	Republican	1940	Incumbent retired. Republican hold.	▌ ✓ Ancher Nelsen (Republican) 57.1%; ▌Conrad H. Hammar (DFL) 42.9%
Minnesota 3	Roy Wier	Democratic (DFL)	1948	Incumbent re-elected.	▌ ✓ Roy Wier (DFL) 51.6%; ▌Leonard E. Lindquist (Republican) 48.4%
Minnesota 4	Eugene McCarthy	Democratic (DFL)	1948	Incumbent retired to run for U.S. senator. Democratic hold.	▌ ✓ Joseph Karth (DFL) 56.4%; ▌Frank S. Farrell (Republican) 43.6%
Minnesota 5	Walter Judd	Republican	1942	Incumbent re-elected.	▌ ✓ Walter Judd (Republican) 57.3%; ▌Joe Robbie (DFL) 42.7%
Minnesota 6	Fred Marshall	Democratic (DFL)	1948	Incumbent re-elected.	▌ ✓ Fred Marshall (DFL) 64.3%; ▌Hugo Holmstrom (Republican) 35.7%
Minnesota 7	H. Carl Andersen	Republican	1938	Incumbent re-elected.	▌ ✓ H. Carl Andersen (Republican) 53.3%; ▌A. I. Johnson (DFL) 46.7%
Minnesota 8	John Blatnik	Democratic (DFL)	1946	Incumbent re-elected.	▌ ✓ John Blatnik (DFL) 75.6%; ▌Roy W. Ranum (Republican) 24.4%
Minnesota 9	Coya Knutson	Democratic (DFL)	1954	Incumbent lost re-election. Republican gain.	▌ ✓ Odin Langen (Republican) 50.7%; ▌Coya Knutson (DFL) 49.3%

== Mississippi ==
District	Incumbent			This race	
District	Member	Party	First elected	Results	Candidates
Mississippi 1	Thomas Abernethy	Democratic	1942	Incumbent re-elected.	▌ ✓ Thomas Abernethy (Democratic); Uncontested
Mississippi 2	Jamie Whitten	Democratic	1941 (special)	Incumbent re-elected.	▌ ✓ Jamie Whitten (Democratic); Uncontested
Mississippi 3	Frank E. Smith	Democratic	1950	Incumbent re-elected.	▌ ✓ Frank E. Smith (Democratic); Uncontested
Mississippi 4	John Bell Williams	Democratic	1946	Incumbent re-elected.	▌ ✓ John Bell Williams (Democratic); Uncontested
Mississippi 5	W. Arthur Winstead	Democratic	1942	Incumbent re-elected.	▌ ✓ W. Arthur Winstead (Democratic); Uncontested
Mississippi 6	William M. Colmer	Democratic	1932	Incumbent re-elected.	▌ ✓ William M. Colmer (Democratic); Uncontested

== Missouri ==
District	Incumbent			This race	
District	Member	Party	First elected	Results	Candidates
Missouri 1	Frank M. Karsten	Democratic	1946	Incumbent re-elected.	▌ ✓ Frank M. Karsten (Democratic) 75.8%; ▌Paul E. Corning Jr. (Republican) 24.2%
Missouri 2	Thomas B. Curtis	Republican	1950	Incumbent re-elected.	▌ ✓ Thomas B. Curtis (Republican) 51.9%; ▌James L. Sullivan (Democratic) 48.1%
Missouri 3	Leonor Sullivan	Democratic	1952	Incumbent re-elected.	▌ ✓ Leonor Sullivan (Democratic) 79.2%; ▌Josiah C. Thomas (Republican) 20.8%
Missouri 4	George H. Christopher	Democratic	1954	Incumbent re-elected.	▌ ✓ George H. Christopher (Democratic) 64.0%; ▌James A. Rahm (Republican) 36.0%
Missouri 5	Richard W. Bolling	Democratic	1948	Incumbent re-elected.	▌ ✓ Richard W. Bolling (Democratic) 70.0%; ▌Richard W. Byrne (Republican) 30.0%
Missouri 6	William R. Hull Jr.	Democratic	1954	Incumbent re-elected.	▌ ✓ William R. Hull Jr. (Democratic) 64.9%; ▌Clyde M. Kirk (Republican) 35.1%
Missouri 7	Charles Harrison Brown	Democratic	1956	Incumbent re-elected.	▌ ✓ Charles Harrison Brown (Democratic) 53.7%; ▌Noel Cox (Republican) 46.3%
Missouri 8	A. S. J. Carnahan	Democratic	1948	Incumbent re-elected.	▌ ✓ A. S. J. Carnahan (Democratic) 64.3%; ▌Francis Howard (Republican) 35.7%
Missouri 9	Clarence Cannon	Democratic	1922	Incumbent re-elected.	▌ ✓ Clarence Cannon (Democratic) 64.8%; ▌Anthony C. Schroeder (Republican) 35.2%
Missouri 10	Paul C. Jones	Democratic	1948	Incumbent re-elected.	▌ ✓ Paul C. Jones (Democratic) 70.7%; ▌Gilbert Degenhardt (Republican) 29.3%
Missouri 11	Morgan M. Moulder	Democratic	1948	Incumbent re-elected.	▌ ✓ Morgan M. Moulder (Democratic) 56.9%; ▌Don W. Owensby (Republican) 43.1%

== Montana ==
District	Incumbent			This race	
District	Member	Party	First elected	Results	Candidates
Montana 1	Lee Metcalf	Democratic	1952	Incumbent re-elected.	▌ ✓ Lee Metcalf (Democratic) 69.5%; ▌Jean Walterskirchen (Republican) 30.5%
Montana 2	LeRoy H. Anderson	Democratic	1956	Incumbent re-elected.	▌ ✓ LeRoy H. Anderson (Democratic) 61.0%; ▌Ashton Jones (Republican) 39.0%

== Nebraska ==
District	Incumbent			This race	
District	Member	Party	First elected	Results	Candidates
Nebraska 1	Phil Weaver	Republican	1954	Incumbent re-elected.	▌ ✓ Phil Weaver (Republican) 53.4%; ▌Clair A. Callan (Democratic) 46.6%
Nebraska 2	Glenn Cunningham	Republican	1956	Incumbent re-elected.	▌ ✓ Glenn Cunningham (Republican) 64.7%; ▌Francis M. Casey (Democratic) 35.3%
Nebraska 3	R. D. Harrison	Republican	1951 (special)	Incumbent lost re-election. Democratic gain.	▌ ✓ Lawrence Brock (Democratic) 55.1%; ▌R. D. Harrison (Republican) 44.9%
Nebraska 4	Arthur L. Miller	Republican	1942	Incumbent lost re-election. Democratic gain.	▌ ✓ Donald McGinley (Democratic) 52.3%; ▌Arthur L. Miller (Republican) 47.7%

== Nevada ==
District	Incumbent			This race	
District	Member	Party	First elected	Results	Candidates
Nevada at-large	Walter S. Baring Jr.	Democratic	1948; 1952 (lost); 1956	Incumbent re-elected.	▌ ✓ Walter S. Baring Jr. (Democratic) 66.9%; ▌Richard W. Horton (Republican) 33.1%

== New Hampshire ==
District	Incumbent			This race	
District	Member	Party	First elected	Results	Candidates
New Hampshire 1	Chester E. Merrow	Republican	1942	Incumbent re-elected.	▌ ✓ Chester E. Merrow (Republican) 58.4%; ▌Alphonse Roy (Democratic) 41.0%; ▌Harold Sperr (Prohibition) 0.5%
New Hampshire 2	Perkins Bass	Republican	1954	Incumbent re-elected.	▌ ✓ Perkins Bass (Republican) 58.4%; ▌Stuart V. Nims (Democratic) 41.3%; ▌Harvey M. Bailey (Prohibition) 0.4%

== New Jersey ==
District	Incumbent			This race	
District	Member	Party	First elected	Results	Candidates
New Jersey 1	Charles A. Wolverton	Republican	1926	Incumbent retired. Republican hold.	▌ ✓ William T. Cahill (Republican) 50.3%; ▌Alexander Feinberg (Democratic) 49.3%; ▌Stanley E. Sluzalis (Independent) 0.3%; ▌Jules Levin (Socialist Labor) 0.1%
New Jersey 2	Milton W. Glenn	Republican	1957 (special)	Incumbent re-elected.	▌ ✓ Milton W. Glenn (Republican) 53.4%; ▌Joseph G. Hancock (Democratic) 46.1%; ▌Morris Karp (Socialist Labor) 0.5%
New Jersey 3	James C. Auchincloss	Republican	1942	Incumbent re-elected.	▌ ✓ James C. Auchincloss (Republican) 56.1%; ▌Thomas F. Guthrie Jr. (Democratic) 43.9%
New Jersey 4	Frank Thompson	Democratic	1954	Incumbent re-elected.	▌ ✓ Frank Thompson (Democratic) 63.0%; ▌A. Jerome Moore (Republican) 37.0%
New Jersey 5	Peter Frelinghuysen Jr.	Republican	1952	Incumbent re-elected.	▌ ✓ Peter Frelinghuysen Jr. (Republican) 55.7%; ▌David S. North (Democratic) 44.0%; ▌Harry Press (Socialist Labor) 0.3%
New Jersey 6	Florence P. Dwyer	Republican	1956	Incumbent re-elected.	▌ ✓ Florence P. Dwyer (Republican) 51.1%; ▌Jack B. Dunn (Democratic) 46.9%; ▌Alexander Kudlik (Socialist Labor) 1.7%; ▌Frank Chodorov (Conservative) 0.3%
New Jersey 7	William B. Widnall	Republican	1950	Incumbent re-elected.	▌ ✓ William B. Widnall (Republican) 59.6%; ▌J. Emmet Cassidy (Democratic) 40.0%; ▌Robert A. Kretzer (Conservative) 0.3%
New Jersey 8	Gordon Canfield	Republican	1940	Incumbent re-elected.	▌ ✓ Gordon Canfield (Republican) 58.1%; ▌Joseph R. Brumale (Democratic) 41.2%; ▌Harry Santhouse (Socialist Labor) 0.5%; ▌Ronald G. Timm (Conservative) 0.2%
New Jersey 9	Frank C. Osmers Jr.	Republican	1951 (special)	Incumbent re-elected.	▌ ✓ Frank C. Osmers Jr. (Republican) 57.4%; ▌Daniel W. Allen (Democratic) 42.0%; ▌Herman H. Rhael (Socialist Labor) 0.4%; ▌Arthur A. Wacker (Conservative) 0.3%
New Jersey 10	Peter W. Rodino	Democratic	1948	Incumbent re-elected.	▌ ✓ Peter W. Rodino (Democratic) 63.9%; ▌G. George Addonzio (Republican) 34.8%; ▌Frank J. DeGeorge (Conservative) 1.3%
New Jersey 11	Hugh J. Addonizio	Democratic	1948	Incumbent re-elected.	▌ ✓ Hugh J. Addonizio (Democratic) 59.3%; ▌John P. Langan (Republican) 40.7%
New Jersey 12	Robert Kean	Republican	1938	Incumbent retired to run for U.S. senator. Republican hold.	▌ ✓ George M. Wallhauser (Republican) 52.7%; ▌Thomas J. Holleran (Democratic) 45.3%; ▌Mathew U. Litman (Independent) 1.3%; ▌Tony Marsella (Socialist Labor) 0.5%; ▌Harold Poeschel (Conservative) 0.3%
New Jersey 13	Alfred Sieminski	Democratic	1950	Incumbent lost renomination. Democratic hold.	▌ ✓ Neil Gallagher (Democratic) 66.1%; ▌Samuel F. Kanis (Republican) 24.9%; ▌Anthony D'Elia Jr. (Independent) 3.0%; ▌John Donald Ertle (Independent) 1.9%; ▌Dominick Gemma (Independent) 1.3%; ▌George B. Saxenmeyer (Independent) 0.8%; ▌Samuel Cooper (Independent) 0.7%; ▌Edward T. Devlin (Independent) 0.6%; ▌William F. Burns Jr. (Independent) 0.4%; ▌James A. Carney (Independent) 0.2%; ▌Edgar G. Brode (Independent) 0.1%
New Jersey 14	Vincent J. Dellay	Republican	1956	Incumbent lost renomination. Democratic gain.	▌ ✓ Dominick V. Daniels (Democratic) 62.8%; ▌Frank A. Musto (Republican) 33.0%; ▌Eugene J. Tarrant (Independent) 2.8%; ▌Ferdinand C. Rogers (Independent) 0.9%; ▌John E. Walton (Independent) 0.3%; ▌Robert F. Urguhart (Independent) 0.2%

== New Mexico ==
District	Incumbent			This race	
District	Member	Party	First elected	Results	Candidates
New Mexico at-large 2 seats on a general ticket	Joseph Montoya	Democratic	1957 (special)	Incumbent re-elected.	▌ ✓ Joseph Montoya (Democratic) 32.5%; ▌ ✓ Thomas G. Morris (Democratic) 30.1%; ▌William A. Thompson (Republican) 19.0%; ▌George W. McKim (Republican) 18.4%
New Mexico at-large 2 seats on a general ticket	Vacant			John J. Dempsey (D) died March 11, 1958. Democratic hold.	▌ ✓ Joseph Montoya (Democratic) 32.5%; ▌ ✓ Thomas G. Morris (Democratic) 30.1%; ▌William A. Thompson (Republican) 19.0%; ▌George W. McKim (Republican) 18.4%

== New York ==
District	Incumbent			This race	
District	Member	Party	First elected	Results	Candidates
New York 1	Stuyvesant Wainwright	Republican	1952	Incumbent re-elected.	▌ ✓ Stuyvesant Wainwright (Republican) 57.5%; ▌Otis G. Pike (Democratic) 42.5%
New York 2	Steven Derounian	Republican	1952	Incumbent re-elected.	▌ ✓ Steven Derounian (Republican) 60.5%; ▌Walter A. Lynch Jr. (Democratic) 39.5%
New York 3	Frank J. Becker	Republican	1952	Incumbent re-elected.	▌ ✓ Frank J. Becker (Republican) 54.4%; ▌A. William Larson (Democratic) 45.6%
New York 4	Henry J. Latham	Republican	1944	Incumbent retired to serve on New York Supreme Court. Republican hold.	▌ ✓ Seymour Halpern (Republican) 52.6%; ▌Joseph J. Perrini (Democratic) 47.4%
New York 5	Albert H. Bosch	Republican	1952	Incumbent re-elected.	▌ ✓ Albert H. Bosch (Republican) 52.1%; ▌William Kerwick (Democratic) 43.7%; ▌Howard Rudner (Liberal) 4.2%
New York 6	Lester Holtzman	Democratic	1952	Incumbent re-elected.	▌ ✓ Lester Holtzman (Democratic) 63.6%; ▌George T. Reilly (Republican) 36.4%
New York 7	James J. Delaney	Democratic	1944; 1946 (lost); 1948	Incumbent re-elected.	▌ ✓ James J. Delaney (Democratic) 61.1%; ▌Edward V. Lisoski (Republican) 38.9%
New York 8	Victor Anfuso	Democratic	1954	Incumbent re-elected.	▌ ✓ Victor Anfuso (Democratic) 71.7%; ▌Leon F. Nadrowski (Republican) 28.3%
New York 9	Eugene Keogh	Democratic	1936	Incumbent re-elected.	▌ ✓ Eugene Keogh (Democratic) 72.1%; ▌Anton Eyring (Republican) 27.9%
New York 10	Edna F. Kelly	Democratic	1949 (special)	Incumbent re-elected.	▌ ✓ Edna F. Kelly (Democratic) 76.1%; ▌Jerome P. Schneider (Republican) 23.9%
New York 11	Emanuel Celler	Democratic	1922	Incumbent re-elected.	▌ ✓ Emanuel Celler (Democratic) 81.4%; ▌Jesse M. Browner (Republican) 18.6%
New York 12	Francis E. Dorn	Republican	1952	Incumbent re-elected.	▌ ✓ Francis E. Dorn (Republican) 52.7%; ▌Thomas J. Cuite (Democratic) 39.9%; ▌Leroy Bowman (Liberal) 7.4%
New York 13	Abraham J. Multer	Democratic	1947 (special)	Incumbent re-elected.	▌ ✓ Abraham J. Multer (Democratic) 76.1%; ▌Hyman D. Siegel (Republican) 23.9%
New York 14	John J. Rooney	Democratic	1944	Incumbent re-elected.	▌ ✓ John J. Rooney (Democratic) 70.6%; ▌Anthony D'Allessandro (Republican) 29.4%
New York 15	John H. Ray	Republican	1952	Incumbent re-elected.	▌ ✓ John H. Ray (Republican) 52.8%; ▌Vincent R. Fitzpatrick (Democratic) 47.2%
New York 16	Adam Clayton Powell Jr.	Democratic	1944	Incumbent re-elected.	▌ ✓ Adam Clayton Powell Jr. (Democratic) 90.8%; ▌Earl Brown (Liberal) 9.2%
New York 17	Frederic Coudert Jr.	Republican	1946	Incumbent retired. Republican hold.	▌ ✓ John Lindsay (Republican) 53.9%; ▌Anthony B. Akers (Democratic) 46.1%
New York 18	Alfred E. Santangelo	Democratic	1956	Incumbent re-elected.	▌ ✓ Alfred E. Santangelo (Democratic) 59.4%; ▌George A. Eyer Jr. (Republican) 33.8%; ▌Manuel Velazquez (Liberal) 6.8%
New York 19	Leonard Farbstein	Democratic	1956	Incumbent re-elected.	▌ ✓ Leonard Farbstein (Democratic) 73.1%; ▌Gonzales Suarez (Republican) 26.9%
New York 20	Ludwig Teller	Democratic	1956	Incumbent re-elected.	▌ ✓ Ludwig Teller (Democratic) 67.0%; ▌Milton H. Adler (Republican) 33.0%
New York 21	Herbert Zelenko	Democratic	1954	Incumbent re-elected.	▌ ✓ Herbert Zelenko (Democratic) 72.5%; ▌Carl Medonick (Democratic) 27.5%
New York 22	James C. Healey	Democratic	1956	Incumbent re-elected.	▌ ✓ James C. Healey (Democratic) 65.2%; ▌Alex J. Soled (Republican) 20.5%; ▌David I. Wells (Liberal) 14.2%
New York 23	Isidore Dollinger	Democratic	1948	Incumbent re-elected.	▌ ✓ Isidore Dollinger (Democratic) 71.5%; ▌Simon M. Koenig (Republican) 17.7%; ▌Hector Matthew (Liberal) 10.8%
New York 24	Charles A. Buckley	Democratic	1934	Incumbent re-elected.	▌ ✓ Charles A. Buckley (Democratic) 56.2%; ▌Charles V. Scanlan (Republican) 28.3%; ▌Murray Koenig (Liberal) 15.5%
New York 25	Paul A. Fino	Republican	1952	Incumbent re-elected.	▌ ✓ Paul A. Fino (Republican) 57.8%; ▌Neal P. Bottiglieri (Democratic) 42.2%
New York 26	Edwin B. Dooley	Republican	1956	Incumbent re-elected.	▌ ✓ Edwin B. Dooley (Republican) 63.2%; ▌Phil E. Gilbert Jr. (Democratic) 36.8%
New York 27	Ralph W. Gwinn	Republican	1944	Incumbent retired. Republican hold.	▌ ✓ Robert R. Barry (Republican) 58.2%; ▌Richard W. McSpedon (Democratic) 41.8%
New York 28	Katharine St. George	Republican	1946	Incumbent re-elected.	▌ ✓ Katharine St. George (Republican) 59.7%; ▌David Sive (Democratic) 38.1%; ▌Irving Astrow (Liberal) 2.2%
New York 29	J. Ernest Wharton	Republican	1950	Incumbent re-elected.	▌ ✓ J. Ernest Wharton (Republican) 63.4%; ▌Christopher D. Morris (Democratic) 36.6%
New York 30	Leo W. O'Brien	Democratic	1952	Incumbent re-elected.	▌ ✓ Leo W. O'Brien (Democratic) 64.7%; ▌George H. Witbeck Jr. (Republican) 35.3%
New York 31	Dean P. Taylor	Republican	1942	Incumbent re-elected.	▌ ✓ Dean P. Taylor (Republican) 63.8%; ▌John R. Cummins (Democratic) 36.2%
New York 32	Bernard W. Kearney	Republican	1942	Incumbent retired. Democratic gain.	▌ ✓ Samuel S. Stratton (Democratic) 54.0%; ▌Walter C. Shaw (Republican) 46.0%
New York 33	Clarence E. Kilburn	Republican	1940	Incumbent re-elected.	▌ ✓ Clarence E. Kilburn (Republican) 64.8%; ▌Robert P. McDonald (Democratic) 35.2%
New York 34	William R. Williams	Republican	1950	Incumbent retired. Republican hold.	▌ ✓ Alexander Pirnie (Republican) 50.8%; ▌Edwin L. Slusarczyk (Democratic) 49.2%
New York 35	R. Walter Riehlman	Republican	1946	Incumbent re-elected.	▌ ✓ R. Walter Riehlman (Republican) 53.8%; ▌Caryl M. Kline (Democratic) 46.2%
New York 36	John Taber	Republican	1922	Incumbent re-elected.	▌ ✓ John Taber (Republican) 64.7%; ▌Frank B. Lent (Democratic) 35.3%
New York 37	Howard W. Robison	Republican	1958	Incumbent re-elected.	▌ ✓ Howard W. Robison (Republican) 65.8%; ▌Francis P. Hogan (Democratic) 34.2%
New York 38	Kenneth B. Keating	Republican	1946	Incumbent retired to run for U.S. Senator. Republican hold.	▌ ✓ Jessica M. Weis (Republican) 58.2%; ▌Alphonse L. Cassetti (Democratic) 41.8%
New York 39	Harold C. Ostertag	Republican	1950	Incumbent re-elected.	▌ ✓ Harold C. Ostertag (Republican) 65.2%; ▌Harold L. Rakov (Democratic) 34.8%
New York 40	William E. Miller	Republican	1950	Incumbent re-elected.	▌ ✓ William E. Miller (Republican) 60.8%; ▌Mariano A. Lucca (Democratic) 36.9%; ▌Hel J. Di Pota (Liberal) 2.3%
New York 41	Edmund P. Radwan	Republican	1950	Incumbent retired. Democratic gain.	▌ ✓ Thaddeus J. Dulski (Democratic) 50.3%; ▌James O. Moore Jr. (Republican) 49.7%
New York 42	John R. Pillion	Republican	1952	Incumbent re-elected.	▌ ✓ John R. Pillion (Republican) 58.9%; ▌Joseph R. Stiglmeier (Democratic) 41.1%
New York 43	Daniel A. Reed	Republican	1918	Incumbent re-elected.	▌ ✓ Daniel A. Reed (Republican) 63.8%; ▌T. Joseph Lynch (Democratic) 34.1%; ▌Leo M. Brushingham (Liberal) 2.2%

== North Carolina ==
District	Incumbent			This race	
District	Member	Party	First elected	Results	Candidates
North Carolina 1	Herbert C. Bonner	Democratic	1940	Incumbent re-elected.	▌ ✓ Herbert C. Bonner (Democratic); Uncontested
North Carolina 2	Lawrence H. Fountain	Democratic	1952	Incumbent re-elected.	▌ ✓ Lawrence H. Fountain (Democratic); Uncontested
North Carolina 3	Graham A. Barden	Democratic	1934	Incumbent re-elected.	▌ ✓ Graham A. Barden (Democratic) 79.1%; ▌Joe A. Dunn (Republican) 20.9%
North Carolina 4	Harold D. Cooley	Democratic	1934	Incumbent re-elected.	▌ ✓ Harold D. Cooley (Democratic) 75.6%; ▌L. T. Dark Jr. (Republican) 24.4%
North Carolina 5	Ralph James Scott	Democratic	1956	Incumbent re-elected.	▌ ✓ Ralph James Scott (Democratic) 71.6%; ▌William E. Morrow (Republican) 28.4%
North Carolina 6	Carl T. Durham	Democratic	1938	Incumbent re-elected.	▌ ✓ Carl T. Durham (Democratic); Uncontested
North Carolina 7	Alton Lennon	Democratic	1956	Incumbent re-elected.	▌ ✓ Alton Lennon (Democratic) 89.0%; ▌C. Dana Malpass (Republican) 11.0%
North Carolina 8	Alvin Paul Kitchin	Democratic	1956	Incumbent re-elected.	▌ ✓ Alvin Paul Kitchin (Democratic) 63.4%; ▌F. D. B. Harding (Republican) 36.6%
North Carolina 9	Hugh Quincy Alexander	Democratic	1952	Incumbent re-elected.	▌ ✓ Hugh Quincy Alexander (Democratic) 66.5%; ▌William White (Republican) 33.5%
North Carolina 10	Charles R. Jonas	Republican	1952	Incumbent re-elected.	▌ ✓ Charles R. Jonas (Republican) 51.9%; ▌David Clark (Democratic) 48.1%
North Carolina 11	Basil Lee Whitener	Democratic	1956	Incumbent re-elected.	▌ ✓ Basil Lee Whitener (Democratic); Uncontested
North Carolina 12	George A. Shuford	Democratic	1952	Incumbent retired. Democratic hold.	▌ ✓ David McKee Hall (Democratic) 62.5%; ▌W. Harold Sams (Republican) 37.5%

== North Dakota ==
District	Incumbent			This race	
District	Member	Party	First elected	Results	Candidates
North Dakota at-large	Usher L. Burdick	Republican	1948	Incumbent retired. Republican hold.	▌ ✓ Quentin Burdick (Democratic-NPL) 27.0%; ▌ ✓ Don L. Short (Republican) 26.6%; ▌Orris G. Nordhougen (Republican) 25.0%; ▌S. B. Hocking (Democratic-NPL) 21.4%
North Dakota at-large	Otto Krueger	Republican	1952	Incumbent retired. Democratic-NPL gain.	▌ ✓ Quentin Burdick (Democratic-NPL) 27.0%; ▌ ✓ Don L. Short (Republican) 26.6%; ▌Orris G. Nordhougen (Republican) 25.0%; ▌S. B. Hocking (Democratic-NPL) 21.4%

== Ohio ==
District	Incumbent			This race	
District	Member	Party	First elected	Results	Candidates
Ohio 1	Gordon H. Scherer	Republican	1952	Incumbent re-elected.	▌ ✓ Gordon H. Scherer (Republican) 56.6%; ▌W. Ted Osborne (Democratic) 43.4%
Ohio 2	William E. Hess	Republican	1950	Incumbent re-elected.	▌ ✓ William E. Hess (Republican) 54.7%; ▌James O. Bradley (Democratic) 45.3%
Ohio 3	Paul F. Schenck	Republican	1951 (special)	Incumbent re-elected.	▌ ✓ Paul F. Schenck (Republican) 52.4%; ▌Thomas B. Talbot (Democratic) 47.6%
Ohio 4	William McCulloch	Republican	1947 (special)	Incumbent re-elected.	▌ ✓ William McCulloch (Republican) 61.0%; ▌Marjorie Conrad Struna (Democratic) 39.0%
Ohio 5	Cliff Clevenger	Republican	1938	Incumbent retired. Republican hold.	▌ ✓ Del Latta (Republican) 53.9%; ▌George E. Rafferty (Democratic) 46.1%
Ohio 6	James G. Polk	Democratic	1948	Incumbent re-elected.	▌ ✓ James G. Polk (Democratic) 62.0%; ▌Elmer S. Barrett (Republican) 38.0%
Ohio 7	Clarence J. Brown	Republican	1938	Incumbent re-elected.	▌ ✓ Clarence J. Brown (Republican) 60.5%; ▌Joseph A. Sullivan (Democratic) 39.5%
Ohio 8	Jackson Edward Betts	Republican	1950	Incumbent re-elected.	▌ ✓ Jackson Edward Betts (Republican) 61.3%; ▌Virgil M. Gase (Democratic) 38.7%
Ohio 9	Thomas L. Ashley	Democratic	1954	Incumbent re-elected.	▌ ✓ Thomas L. Ashley (Democratic) 61.6%; ▌William K. Gernheuser (Republican) 38.4%
Ohio 10	Thomas A. Jenkins	Republican	1924	Incumbent retired. Democratic gain.	▌ ✓ Walter H. Moeller (Democratic) 52.9%; ▌Homer E. Abele (Republican) 47.1%
Ohio 11	David S. Dennison Jr.	Republican	1956	Incumbent lost re-election. Democratic gain.	▌ ✓ Robert E. Cook (Democratic) 50.3%; ▌David S. Dennison Jr. (Republican) 49.7%
Ohio 12	John M. Vorys	Republican	1938	Incumbent retired. Republican hold.	▌ ✓ Samuel L. Devine (Republican) 54.4%; ▌Walter J. Shapter Jr. (Democratic) 45.6%
Ohio 13	A. David Baumhart Jr.	Republican	1954	Incumbent re-elected.	▌ ✓ A. David Baumhart Jr. (Republican) 58.9%; ▌J. William McCray (Democratic) 41.1%
Ohio 14	William H. Ayres	Republican	1950	Incumbent re-elected.	▌ ✓ William H. Ayres (Republican) 60.1%; ▌Jack B. Arnold (Democratic) 39.9%
Ohio 15	John E. Henderson	Republican	1954	Incumbent re-elected.	▌ ✓ John E. Henderson (Republican) 57.3%; ▌Herbert U. Smith (Democratic) 42.7%
Ohio 16	Frank T. Bow	Republican	1950	Incumbent re-elected.	▌ ✓ Frank T. Bow (Republican) 57.4%; ▌John G. Freedom (Democratic) 42.6%
Ohio 17	Vacant			J. Harry McGregor (R) died October 7, 1958. Democratic gain.	▌ ✓ Robert W. Levering (Democratic) 51.7%; ▌Laurence Burns (Republican) 48.3%
Ohio 18	Wayne Hays	Democratic	1948	Incumbent re-elected.	▌ ✓ Wayne Hays (Democratic) 71.5%; ▌Francis Wallace (Republican) 28.5%
Ohio 19	Michael J. Kirwan	Democratic	1936	Incumbent re-elected.	▌ ✓ Michael J. Kirwan (Democratic) 75.0%; ▌Loren E. Van Brocklin (Republican) 25.0%
Ohio 20	Michael A. Feighan	Democratic	1942	Incumbent re-elected.	▌ ✓ Michael A. Feighan (Democratic) 79.4%; ▌Malvern B. Schultz (Republican) 20.6%
Ohio 21	Charles Vanik	Democratic	1954	Incumbent re-elected.	▌ ✓ Charles Vanik (Democratic) 80.4%; ▌Elmer L. Watson (Republican) 19.6%
Ohio 22	Frances P. Bolton	Republican	1940	Incumbent re-elected.	▌ ✓ Frances P. Bolton (Republican) 55.3%; ▌Chat Paterson (Democratic) 44.7%
Ohio 23	William E. Minshall Jr.	Republican	1954	Incumbent re-elected.	▌ ✓ William E. Minshall Jr. (Republican) 66.5%; ▌Daniel Winston (Democratic) 33.5%

== Oklahoma ==
District	Incumbent			This race	
District	Member	Party	First elected	Results	Candidates
Oklahoma 1	Page Belcher	Republican	1950	Incumbent re-elected.	▌ ✓ Page Belcher (Republican) 50.8%; ▌Herbert William Wright Jr. (Democratic) 48.3%; ▌George H. Brasier (Independent) 0.9%
Oklahoma 2	Ed Edmondson	Democratic	1952	Incumbent re-elected.	▌ ✓ Ed Edmondson (Democratic) 79.1%; ▌Milo Ritter (Republican) 20.9%
Oklahoma 3	Carl Albert	Democratic	1946	Incumbent re-elected.	▌ ✓ Carl Albert (Democratic) 90.9%; ▌Chapin Wallace (Republican) 9.1%
Oklahoma 4	Tom Steed	Democratic	1948	Incumbent re-elected.	▌ ✓ Tom Steed (Democratic) 74.1%; ▌Rolla C. Calkin (Republican) 25.9%
Oklahoma 5	John Jarman	Democratic	1950	Incumbent re-elected.	▌ ✓ John Jarman (Democratic) 82.3%; ▌Hobart H. Hobbs (Republican) 17.7%
Oklahoma 6	Toby Morris	Democratic	1956	Incumbent re-elected.	▌ ✓ Toby Morris (Democratic) 66.7%; ▌Fred L. Coogan (Republican) 33.3%

== Oregon ==
District	Incumbent			This race	
District	Member	Party	First elected	Results	Candidates
Oregon 1	A. Walter Norblad	Republican	1946	Incumbent re-elected.	▌ ✓ A. Walter Norblad (Republican) 54.9%; ▌Robert Y. Thornton (Democratic) 45.1%
Oregon 2	Al Ullman	Democratic	1956	Incumbent re-elected.	▌ ✓ Al Ullman (Democratic) 61.6%; ▌Marion T. Weatherford (Republican) 38.4%
Oregon 3	Edith Green	Democratic	1954	Incumbent re-elected.	▌ ✓ Edith Green (Democratic) 65.8%; ▌John Johnston (Republican) 34.2%
Oregon 4	Charles O. Porter	Democratic	1956	Incumbent re-elected.	▌ ✓ Charles O. Porter (Democratic) 56.3%; ▌Paul Geddes (Republican) 43.7%

== Pennsylvania ==
District	Incumbent			This race	
District	Member	Party	First elected	Results	Candidates
Pennsylvania 1	William A. Barrett	Democratic	1944; 1946 (lost); 1948	Incumbent re-elected.	▌ ✓ William A. Barrett (Democratic) 64.7%; ▌Gerald Ianelli (Republican) 35.3%
Pennsylvania 2	Kathryn E. Granahan	Democratic	1956	Incumbent re-elected.	▌ ✓ Kathryn E. Granahan (Democratic) 66.3%; ▌Maurice M. Green (Republican) 33.7%
Pennsylvania 3	James A. Byrne	Democratic	1952	Incumbent re-elected.	▌ ✓ James A. Byrne (Democratic) 63.5%; ▌James T. McDermott (Republican) 36.5%
Pennsylvania 4	Earl Chudoff	Democratic	1948	Incumbent retired to run for judge of Philadelphia Court of Common Pleas. Democratic hold.	▌ ✓ Robert N. C. Nix Sr. (Democratic) 72.6%; ▌Cecil B. Moore (Republican) 27.4%
Pennsylvania 5	William J. Green Jr.	Democratic	1948	Incumbent re-elected.	▌ ✓ William J. Green Jr. (Democratic) 55.3%; ▌D. Donald Jamieson (Republican) 44.7%
Pennsylvania 6	Hugh Scott	Republican	1946	Incumbent retired to run for U.S. senator. Democratic gain.	▌ ✓ Herman Toll (Democratic) 55.4%; ▌Fred C. Gartner (Republican) 44.6%
Pennsylvania 7	Benjamin F. James	Republican	1948	Incumbent retired. Republican hold.	▌ ✓ William H. Milliken Jr. (Republican) 59.2%; ▌Hubert P. Earle (Democratic) 40.8%
Pennsylvania 8	Willard S. Curtin	Republican	1956	Incumbent re-elected.	▌ ✓ Willard S. Curtin (Republican) 54.3%; ▌Harold Lefcourt (Democratic) 45.7%
Pennsylvania 9	Paul B. Dague	Republican	1946	Incumbent re-elected.	▌ ✓ Paul B. Dague (Republican) 61.9%; ▌James C. N. Paul (Democratic) 38.1%
Pennsylvania 10	Joseph L. Carrigg	Republican	1951 (special)	Incumbent lost re-election. Democratic gain.	▌ ✓ Stanley A. Prokop (Democratic) 50.4%; ▌Joseph L. Carrigg (Republican) 49.6%
Pennsylvania 11	Daniel Flood	Democratic	1944; 1946 (lost); 1948; 1952 (lost); 1954	Incumbent re-elected.	▌ ✓ Daniel Flood (Democratic) 61.7%; ▌Herman Kersteen (Republican) 38.3%
Pennsylvania 12	Ivor D. Fenton	Republican	1938	Incumbent re-elected.	▌ ✓ Ivor D. Fenton (Republican) 54.9%; ▌Charles E. Lotz (Democratic) 45.1%
Pennsylvania 13	John A. Lafore Jr.	Republican	1957 (special)	Incumbent re-elected.	▌ ✓ John A. Lafore Jr. (Republican) 62.9%; ▌John T. Synnestvedt (Democratic) 37.1%
Pennsylvania 14	George M. Rhodes	Democratic	1948	Incumbent re-elected.	▌ ✓ George M. Rhodes (Democratic) 58.3%; ▌Thomas C. Anthony Jr. (Republican) 41.1%; ▌Darlington Hoopes (Socialist) 0.6%
Pennsylvania 15	Francis E. Walter	Democratic	1932	Incumbent re-elected.	▌ ✓ Francis E. Walter (Democratic) 61.1%; ▌Luther H. Ackerman (Republican) 38.9%
Pennsylvania 16	Walter M. Mumma	Republican	1950	Incumbent re-elected.	▌ ✓ Walter M. Mumma (Republican) 56.6%; ▌John H. Bream (Democratic) 43.4%
Pennsylvania 17	Alvin Bush	Republican	1950	Incumbent re-elected.	▌ ✓ Alvin Bush (Republican) 56.0%; ▌C. Max Hess (Democratic) 44.0%
Pennsylvania 18	Richard M. Simpson	Republican	1937 (special)	Incumbent re-elected.	▌ ✓ Richard M. Simpson (Republican) 56.3%; ▌Ross E. Hershberger (Democratic) 43.7%
Pennsylvania 19	S. Walter Stauffer	Republican	1956	Incumbent lost re-election. Democratic gain.	▌ ✓ James M. Quigley (Democratic) 51.5%; ▌S. Walter Stauffer (Republican) 48.5%
Pennsylvania 20	James E. Van Zandt	Republican	1946	Incumbent re-elected.	▌ ✓ James E. Van Zandt (Republican) 64.9%; ▌Julia L. Maietta (Democratic) 35.1%
Pennsylvania 21	John H. Dent	Democratic	1958	Incumbent re-elected.	▌ ✓ John H. Dent (Democratic) 59.1%; ▌Edward S. Stiteler (Republican) 40.9%
Pennsylvania 22	John P. Saylor	Republican	1949 (special)	Incumbent re-elected.	▌ ✓ John P. Saylor (Republican) 57.0%; ▌Robert S. Glass (Democratic) 43.0%
Pennsylvania 23	Leon H. Gavin	Republican	1942	Incumbent re-elected.	▌ ✓ Leon H. Gavin (Republican) 61.1%; ▌Thomas P. Kennedy (Democratic) 38.9%
Pennsylvania 24	Carroll D. Kearns	Republican	1946	Incumbent re-elected.	▌ ✓ Carroll D. Kearns (Republican) 53.8%; ▌James P. O'Brien (Democratic) 46.2%
Pennsylvania 25	Frank M. Clark	Democratic	1954	Incumbent re-elected.	▌ ✓ Frank M. Clark (Democratic) 58.9%; ▌Thomas W. King Jr. (Republican) 41.1%
Pennsylvania 26	Thomas E. Morgan	Democratic	1944	Incumbent re-elected.	▌ ✓ Thomas E. Morgan (Democratic) 64.8%; ▌Harry T. Zimmer Jr. (Republican) 35.2%
Pennsylvania 27	James G. Fulton	Republican	1944	Incumbent re-elected.	▌ ✓ James G. Fulton (Republican) 64.1%; ▌Emery F. Bacon (Democratic) 35.9%
Pennsylvania 28	Vacant			Herman P. Eberharter (D) died September 9, 1958. Democratic hold.	▌ ✓ William S. Moorhead (Democratic) 67.3%; ▌Harry L. Verbofsky (Republican) 32.7%
Pennsylvania 29	Robert J. Corbett	Republican	1938; 1940 (lost); 1944	Incumbent re-elected.	▌ ✓ Robert J. Corbett (Republican) 63.6%; ▌Lee T. Sellars (Democratic) 36.4%
Pennsylvania 30	Elmer J. Holland	Democratic	1942 (special); 1942 (retired); 1956 (special)	Incumbent re-elected.	▌ ✓ Elmer J. Holland (Democratic) 66.7%; ▌Harold E. Morgan (Republican) 33.3%

== Rhode Island ==
District	Incumbent			This race	
District	Member	Party	First elected	Results	Candidates
Rhode Island 1	Aime Forand	Democratic	1940	Incumbent re-elected.	▌ ✓ Aime Forand (Democratic) 62.9%; ▌Francis E. Martineau (Republican) 37.1%
Rhode Island 2	John E. Fogarty	Democratic	1940	Incumbent re-elected.	▌ ✓ John E. Fogarty (Democratic) 63.3%; ▌Robert L. Gammell (Republican) 36.6%; ▌Barbara P. Snyder (Prohibition) 0.1%

== South Carolina ==
District	Incumbent			This race	
District	Member	Party	First elected	Results	Candidates
South Carolina 1	L. Mendel Rivers	Democratic	1940	Incumbent re-elected.	▌ ✓ L. Mendel Rivers (Democratic); Uncontested
South Carolina 2	John J. Riley	Democratic	1950	Incumbent re-elected.	▌ ✓ John J. Riley (Democratic); Uncontested
South Carolina 3	William J. B. Dorn	Democratic	1946; 1948 (retired); 1950	Incumbent re-elected.	▌ ✓ William J. B. Dorn (Democratic); Uncontested
South Carolina 4	Robert T. Ashmore	Democratic	1953 (special)	Incumbent re-elected.	▌ ✓ Robert T. Ashmore (Democratic); Uncontested
South Carolina 5	Robert W. Hemphill	Democratic	1956	Incumbent re-elected.	▌ ✓ Robert W. Hemphill (Democratic); Uncontested
South Carolina 6	John L. McMillan	Democratic	1938	Incumbent re-elected.	▌ ✓ John L. McMillan (Democratic); Uncontested

== South Dakota ==
District	Incumbent			This race	
District	Member	Party	First elected	Results	Candidates
South Dakota 1	George McGovern	Democratic	1956	Incumbent re-elected.	▌ ✓ George McGovern (Democratic) 53.4%; ▌Joe Foss (Republican) 46.6%
South Dakota 2	E. Y. Berry	Republican	1950	Incumbent re-elected.	▌ ✓ E. Y. Berry (Republican) 55.6%; ▌J. T. McCullen (Democratic) 44.4%

== Tennessee ==
District	Incumbent			This race	
District	Member	Party	First elected	Results	Candidates
Tennessee 1	B. Carroll Reece	Republican	1950	Incumbent re-elected.	▌ ✓ B. Carroll Reece (Republican) 58.7%; ▌Mayne W. Miller (Democratic) 41.3%
Tennessee 2	Howard Baker Sr.	Republican	1950	Incumbent re-elected.	▌ ✓ Howard Baker Sr. (Republican) 67.7%; ▌John Grady O'Hara (Democratic) 32.2%; ▌E. B. Bowles (Write-in) 0.2%
Tennessee 3	James B. Frazier Jr.	Democratic	1948	Incumbent re-elected.	▌ ✓ James B. Frazier Jr. (Democratic); Uncontested
Tennessee 4	Joe L. Evins	Democratic	1946	Incumbent re-elected.	▌ ✓ Joe L. Evins (Democratic) 100.0%; ▌Joe Sir (W/I) 0.003%
Tennessee 5	J. Carlton Loser	Democratic	1956	Incumbent re-elected.	▌ ✓ J. Carlton Loser (Democratic) 94.4%; ▌Porter Freeman (Republican) 5.6%
Tennessee 6	Ross Bass	Democratic	1954	Incumbent re-elected.	▌ ✓ Ross Bass (Democratic) 97.2%; ▌Joe Sims (Republican) 2.8%; ▌M. A. Peebles (Write-in) 0.003%
Tennessee 7	Tom J. Murray	Democratic	1942	Incumbent re-elected.	▌ ✓ Tom J. Murray (Democratic); Uncontested
Tennessee 8	Fats Everett	Democratic	1958	Incumbent re-elected.	▌ ✓ Fats Everett (Democratic); Uncontested
Tennessee 9	Clifford Davis	Democratic	1940	Incumbent re-elected.	▌ ✓ Clifford Davis (Democratic); Uncontested

== Texas ==
Texas eliminated its at-large district and added a new 22nd district formed from part of the Houston area 8th district.

District	Incumbent			This race	
District	Member	Party	First elected	Results	Candidates
Texas 1	Wright Patman	Democratic	1928	Incumbent re-elected.	▌ ✓ Wright Patman (Democratic); Uncontested
Texas 2	Jack Brooks	Democratic	1952	Incumbent re-elected.	▌ ✓ Jack Brooks (Democratic); Uncontested
Texas 3	Lindley Beckworth	Democratic	1956	Incumbent re-elected.	▌ ✓ Lindley Beckworth (Democratic); Uncontested
Texas 4	Sam Rayburn	Democratic	1912	Incumbent re-elected.	▌ ✓ Sam Rayburn (Democratic); Uncontested
Texas 5	Bruce Alger	Republican	1954	Incumbent re-elected.	▌ ✓ Bruce Alger (Republican) 52.6%; ▌Barefoot Sanders (Democratic) 47.4%
Texas 6	Olin E. Teague	Democratic	1946	Incumbent re-elected.	▌ ✓ Olin E. Teague (Democratic); Uncontested
Texas 7	John Dowdy	Democratic	1952	Incumbent re-elected.	▌ ✓ John Dowdy (Democratic) 96.7%; ▌Joseph E. A. Ross (Republican) 3.3%
Texas 8	Albert Thomas	Democratic	1936	Incumbent re-elected.	▌ ✓ Albert Thomas (Democratic) 88.2%; ▌Robert E. Nesmith (Republican) 11.8%
Texas 9	Clark W. Thompson	Democratic	1947 (special)	Incumbent re-elected.	▌ ✓ Clark W. Thompson (Democratic); Uncontested
Texas 10	Homer Thornberry	Democratic	1948	Incumbent re-elected.	▌ ✓ Homer Thornberry (Democratic); Uncontested
Texas 11	William R. Poage	Democratic	1936	Incumbent re-elected.	▌ ✓ William R. Poage (Democratic); Uncontested
Texas 12	Jim Wright	Democratic	1954	Incumbent re-elected.	▌ ✓ Jim Wright (Democratic); Uncontested
Texas 13	Frank N. Ikard	Democratic	1951 (special)	Incumbent re-elected.	▌ ✓ Frank N. Ikard (Democratic); Uncontested
Texas 14	John Andrew Young	Democratic	1956	Incumbent re-elected.	▌ ✓ John Andrew Young (Democratic); Uncontested
Texas 15	Joe M. Kilgore	Democratic	1954	Incumbent re-elected.	▌ ✓ Joe M. Kilgore (Democratic); Uncontested
Texas 16	J. T. Rutherford	Democratic	1954	Incumbent re-elected.	▌ ✓ J. T. Rutherford (Democratic); Uncontested
Texas 17	Omar Burleson	Democratic	1946	Incumbent re-elected.	▌ ✓ Omar Burleson (Democratic); Uncontested
Texas 18	Walter E. Rogers	Democratic	1950	Incumbent re-elected.	▌ ✓ Walter E. Rogers (Democratic); Uncontested
Texas 19	George H. Mahon	Democratic	1934	Incumbent re-elected.	▌ ✓ George H. Mahon (Democratic); Uncontested
Texas 20	Paul J. Kilday	Democratic	1938	Incumbent re-elected.	▌ ✓ Paul J. Kilday (Democratic); Uncontested
Texas 21	O. C. Fisher	Democratic	1942	Incumbent re-elected.	▌ ✓ O. C. Fisher (Democratic); Uncontested
Texas 22	Martin Dies Jr. Redistricted from the at-large district	Democratic	1952	Incumbent retired. Democratic hold.	▌ ✓ Robert R. Casey (Democratic) 61.7%; ▌T. Everton Kennerly (Republican) 32.9%; ▌Jack Gardner (Write-in) 5.4%

== Utah ==
District	Incumbent			This race	
District	Member	Party	First elected	Results	Candidates
Utah 1	Henry Aldous Dixon	Republican	1954	Incumbent re-elected.	▌ ✓ Henry Aldous Dixon (Republican) 53.9%; ▌M. Blaine Peterson (Democratic) 46.1%
Utah 2	William A. Dawson	Republican	1952	Incumbent lost re-election. Democratic gain.	▌ ✓ David S. King (Democratic) 51.1%; ▌William A. Dawson (Republican) 48.9%

== Vermont ==
Results by county: Meyer: 50–60%; 60–70%; Arthur: 50–60%; 60–70%

District	Incumbent			This race	
District	Member	Party	First elected	Results	Candidates
Vermont at-large	Winston L. Prouty	Republican	1950	Incumbent retired to run for U.S. senator. Democratic gain.	▌ ✓ William H. Meyer (Democratic) 51.5%; ▌Harold J. Arthur (Republican) 48.5%

== Virginia ==
District	Incumbent			This race	
District	Member	Party	First elected	Results	Candidates
Virginia 1	Edward J. Robeson Jr.	Democratic	1950	Incumbent lost renomination. Democratic hold.	▌ ✓ Thomas N. Downing (Democratic); Uncontested
Virginia 2	Porter Hardy Jr.	Democratic	1946	Incumbent re-elected.	▌ ✓ Porter Hardy Jr. (Democratic); Uncontested
Virginia 3	J. Vaughan Gary	Democratic	1945 (special)	Incumbent re-elected.	▌ ✓ J. Vaughan Gary (Democratic) 76.1%; ▌Richard R. Ryder (Republican) 23.9%
Virginia 4	Watkins Abbitt	Democratic	1948	Incumbent re-elected.	▌ ✓ Watkins Abbitt (Democratic) 87.1%; ▌Frank M. McCann (Republican) 12.9%
Virginia 5	William M. Tuck	Democratic	1953 (special)	Incumbent re-elected.	▌ ✓ William M. Tuck (Democratic); Uncontested
Virginia 6	Richard H. Poff	Republican	1952	Incumbent re-elected.	▌ ✓ Richard H. Poff (Republican) 56.7%; ▌Richard F. Pence (Democratic) 42.9%; ▌J. B. Brayman (Social Democratic) 0.4%
Virginia 7	Burr Harrison	Democratic	1946	Incumbent re-elected.	▌ ✓ Burr Harrison (Democratic) 76.6%; ▌Henry A. Oder Jr. (Independent) 23.4%
Virginia 8	Howard W. Smith	Democratic	1930	Incumbent re-elected.	▌ ✓ Howard W. Smith (Democratic); Uncontested
Virginia 9	W. Pat Jennings	Democratic	1954	Incumbent re-elected.	▌ ✓ W. Pat Jennings (Democratic) 76.6%; ▌T. L. Maness (Independent) 23.4%
Virginia 10	Joel Broyhill	Republican	1952	Incumbent re-elected.	▌ ✓ Joel Broyhill (Republican) 52.3%; ▌Joseph H. Freehill (Democratic) 46.5%; ▌Julius Brenner (Independent) 1.2%

== Washington ==
Washington redistricted its at-large seat into a 7th district formed in the Seattle suburbs designed to include the at-large incumbent Don Magnuson's residence.

District	Incumbent			This race	
District	Member	Party	First elected	Results	Candidates
Washington 1	Thomas Pelly	Republican	1952	Incumbent re-elected.	▌ ✓ Thomas Pelly (Republican) 70.1%; ▌Robert Odman (Democratic) 29.9%
Washington 2	Jack Westland	Republican	1952	Incumbent re-elected.	▌ ✓ Jack Westland (Republican) 53.6%; ▌Hugh B. Mitchell (Democratic) 46.1%; ▌Margaret M. Barber (Constitution) 0.3%
Washington 3	Russell V. Mack	Republican	1947 (special)	Incumbent re-elected.	▌ ✓ Russell V. Mack (Republican) 60.9%; ▌Victor A. Meyers (Democratic) 38.9%; ▌Arthur A. Kaul (Constitution) 0.3%
Washington 4	Hal Holmes	Republican	1942	Incumbent retired. Republican hold.	▌ ✓ Catherine Dean May (Republican) 54.0%; ▌Frank LeRoux (Democratic) 45.7%; ▌Fred T. Odell (Constitution) 0.3%
Washington 5	Walt Horan	Republican	1942	Incumbent re-elected.	▌ ✓ Walt Horan (Republican) 53.2%; ▌Tom Delaney (Democratic) 46.3%; ▌Frank Robert Anderson (Constitution) 0.5%
Washington 6	Thor C. Tollefson	Republican	1946	Incumbent re-elected.	▌ ✓ Thor C. Tollefson (Republican) 53.5%; ▌John M. Coffee (Democratic) 45.9%; ▌W. Frank Horne (Constitution) 0.7%
Washington 7	Don Magnuson; Redistricted from the at-large district	Democratic	1952	Incumbent re-elected.	▌ ✓ Don Magnuson (Democratic) 70.7%; ▌Bob Jones (Republican) 29.0%; ▌Gerald Poesnecker (Constitution) 0.4%

== West Virginia ==
District	Incumbent			This race	
District	Member	Party	First elected	Results	Candidates
West Virginia 1	Arch A. Moore Jr.	Republican	1956	Incumbent re-elected.	▌ ✓ Arch A. Moore Jr. (Republican) 54.6%; ▌Bob Mollohan (Democratic) 45.4%
West Virginia 2	Harley O. Staggers	Democratic	1948	Incumbent re-elected.	▌ ✓ Harley O. Staggers (Democratic) 62.6%; ▌Ward Keesecker (Republican) 37.4%
West Virginia 3	Cleveland M. Bailey	Democratic	1948	Incumbent re-elected.	▌ ✓ Cleveland M. Bailey (Democratic) 59.9%; ▌Rex Bumgardner (Republican) 40.1%
West Virginia 4	Will E. Neal	Republican	1956	Incumbent lost re-election. Democratic gain.	▌ ✓ Ken Hechler (Democratic) 51.5%; ▌Will E. Neal (Republican) 48.5%
West Virginia 5	Elizabeth Kee	Democratic	1951 (special)	Incumbent re-elected.	▌ ✓ Elizabeth Kee (Democratic) 99.8%; ▌George A. Daughtery (Write-in) 0.2%
West Virginia 6	Robert Byrd	Democratic	1952	Incumbent retired to run for U.S. senator. Democratic hold.	▌ ✓ John M. Slack Jr. (Democratic) 66.1%; ▌Freeman O'Dair Duff (Republican) 33.9%

== Wisconsin ==
District	Incumbent			This race	
District	Member	Party	First elected	Results	Candidates
Wisconsin 1	Vacant			Lawrence H. Smith (R) died January 22, 1958. Democratic gain.	▌ ✓ Gerald T. Flynn (Democratic) 50.6%; ▌Eleanor J. Smith (Republican) 49.4%
Wisconsin 2	Donald Edgar Tewes	Republican	1956	Incumbent lost re-election. Democratic gain.	▌ ✓ Robert Kastenmeier (Democratic) 52.1%; ▌Donald Edgar Tewes (Republican) 47.9%
Wisconsin 3	Gardner R. Withrow	Republican	1948	Incumbent re-elected.	▌ ✓ Gardner R. Withrow (Republican) 51.2%; ▌Norman M. Clapp (Democratic) 48.8%
Wisconsin 4	Clement Zablocki	Democratic	1948	Incumbent re-elected.	▌ ✓ Clement Zablocki (Democratic) 74.1%; ▌James J. Arnold (Republican) 25.9%
Wisconsin 5	Henry S. Reuss	Democratic	1954	Incumbent re-elected.	▌ ✓ Henry S. Reuss (Democratic) 69.5%; ▌Otto R. Werkmeister (Republican) 30.5%
Wisconsin 6	William Van Pelt	Republican	1950	Incumbent re-elected.	▌ ✓ William Van Pelt (Republican) 52.8%; ▌James Megellas (Democratic) 47.2%
Wisconsin 7	Melvin Laird	Republican	1952	Incumbent re-elected.	▌ ✓ Melvin Laird (Republican) 60.5%; ▌Kenneth Traeger (Democratic) 39.5%
Wisconsin 8	John W. Byrnes	Republican	1944	Incumbent re-elected.	▌ ✓ John W. Byrnes (Republican) 57.3%; ▌Milo Singler (Democratic) 42.7%
Wisconsin 9	Lester Johnson	Democratic	1953 (special)	Incumbent re-elected.	▌ ✓ Lester Johnson (Democratic) 63.1%; ▌Charles A. Hornback (Republican) 36.9%
Wisconsin 10	Alvin O'Konski	Republican	1942	Incumbent re-elected.	▌ ✓ Alvin O'Konski (Republican) 67.1%; ▌Basil G. Kennedy (Democratic) 32.9%

== Wyoming ==
District	Incumbent			This race	
District	Member	Party	First elected	Results	Candidates
Wyoming at-large	Keith Thomson	Republican	1954	Incumbent re-elected.	▌ ✓ Keith Thomson (Republican) 53.6%; ▌Ray Whitaker (Democratic) 46.4%

== Non-voting delegates ==
=== Hawaii Territory ===
District	Incumbent			This race	
District	Member	Party	First elected	Results	Candidates
Hawaii Territory at-large	John A. Burns	Democratic	1956	Incumbent re-elected.	▌ ✓ John A. Burns (Democratic) 54.32%; ▌Farrant L. Turner (Republican) 44.84%; Edgar A. Brenner (Commonwealth) 0.84%

== See also ==
- 1958 United States elections
  - 1958 United States Senate elections
  - 1958 United States gubernatorial elections
- 85th United States Congress
- 86th United States Congress

== Works cited ==
- Abramson, Paul; Aldrich, John; Rohde, David (1995). Change and Continuity in the 1992 Elections. CQ Press. ISBN 0871878399.
