= Martin F. Smith =

American politician (1891–1954)

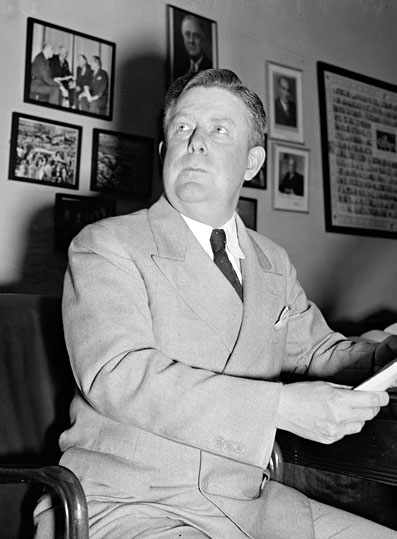
- Smith in 1939

Member of the U.S. House of Representatives from Washington's 3rd district
- In office March 4, 1933 – January 3, 1943
- Preceded by: Albert Johnson
- Succeeded by: Fred B. Norman

Personal details
- Born: May 28, 1891 Chicago, Illinois, U.S.
- Died: October 24, 1954 (aged 63) Bethesda, Maryland, U.S.
- Party: Democratic

Martin Fernard Smith (May 28, 1891 – October 25, 1954) was a U.S. representative from Washington.

== Biography ==
Born in Chicago, Illinois, Smith attended the public schools, Lewis Institute, Chicago, Illinois, and Northwestern University, Evanston, Illinois. He moved to Hoquiam, Washington, in 1911 and completed law studies commenced in Chicago. He was admitted to the bar in 1912 and commenced practice in Hoquiam, Washington. He served as municipal judge of Hoquiam 1914–1917. During the First World War served as a private in the Coast Artillery Corps from October 9, 1918, to December 15, 1918. He served as member of the city council 1926–1928. He served as mayor of Hoquiam 1928–1930.

Smith was elected as a Democrat to the Seventy-third and to the four succeeding Congresses (March 4, 1933 – January 3, 1943). He served as chairman of the Committee on Pensions (Seventy-sixth and Seventy-seventh Congresses). He was an unsuccessful candidate for reelection in 1942 to the Seventy-eighth Congress. He served as delegate to the Democratic National Convention in 1936. He was appointed a member of the Board of Immigration Appeals, United States Department of Justice, on April 1, 1943, and served until his resignation on April 29, 1944. He was an unsuccessful candidate in 1944 for the Democratic nomination for United States Senator. He was appointed special assistant to the Attorney General of the United States on September 26, 1944, and served until his death in Bethesda, Maryland, October 25, 1954. He was interred in Arlington National Cemetery.

== Sources ==
- United States Congress. "Martin F. Smith (id: S000591)". Biographical Directory of the United States Congress.

U.S. House of Representatives
Preceded by Albert Johnson	Member of the U.S. House of Representatives from Washington's 3rd congressional district 1933-1943	Succeeded by Fred B. Norman
