= Washington's 3rd congressional district =

U.S. House district for Washington

Coordinates: 46°30′N 122°48′W

- Interactive map of district boundaries since January 3, 2023 (Vancouver's Clark County highlighted, where almost two-thirds of the district's population resides)
- Representative: Marie Gluesenkamp Perez; D–Washougal
- Population (2025): 809,336
- Median household income: $93,297
- Ethnicity: 75.2% White; 11.0% Hispanic; 6.4% Two or more races; 3.6% Asian; 1.6% Black; 0.9% Native American; 0.8% Pacific Islander Americans; 0.4% other
- Cook PVI: R+2

Washington's 3rd congressional district encompasses the southernmost portion of Western Washington. It includes the counties of Lewis, Pacific, Wahkiakum, Cowlitz, Clark, and Skamania; as well as a small portion of southern Thurston county.

The district is represented by Democrat Marie Gluesenkamp Perez.

The district was one of 13 congressional districts that voted for Donald Trump in the 2024 presidential election while simultaneously electing a Democrat in the 2024 House of Representatives elections.

== History ==
Established after the 1900 census, the 3rd district was represented by Democrats for most of the latter half of the 20th century, until Jolene Unsoeld was defeated by Republican Linda Smith as part of the Republican Revolution of 1994. Smith retired after two terms and was succeeded by Democrat Brian Baird. Baird announced he wouldn't run for re-election in 2010, with Republican Jaime Herrera Beutler winning the seat, during the general election, against Democratic state representative Denny Heck, who was subsequently elected in Washington's 10th congressional district. Herrera Beutler retained her seat over Democrat Jon T. Haugen in 2012. In 2014, she beat Democratic nominee Bob Dingethal.

In presidential elections, the 3rd district is rather competitive. It is the only part of Western Washington to not swing heavily to the Democrats during the 1990s, and it is one of the few districts in the area that cannot be considered safe for either party. It is home to Lewis County, the most conservative county in western Washington. Additionally, most of the district is located in the Portland, Oregon, market; voting patterns there are somewhat different from those in the areas closer to Seattle. George W. Bush narrowly carried the district in 2000 with 48% of the vote and again in 2004 with 50%. The district swung Democratic in 2008, giving Barack Obama 52% of the vote and 46% to John McCain. However, redistricting (see below) extended the district further east and made it slightly more Republican than its predecessor; had the current boundaries been in effect for the 2008 election, Obama would have only defeated McCain by 50.9 percent to 47.1 percent. In 2012, it gave Mitt Romney 49.6% to Obama's 47.9%. In the 2016 presidential election, Republican nominee Donald Trump won the district 49.9% to Hillary Clinton's 42.5%. Trump won every county entirely within the district except Clark County, which he lost by only 316 votes out of over two hundred thousand, including carrying three counties (Pacific, Wahkiakum and Cowlitz) that voted for Walter Mondale in 1984. In 2020, Trump won the district 50.6% to Joe Biden's 46.9%, however, the incumbent Republican Congresswoman, Jaime Herrera Beutler, over-performed the incumbent President, winning the district by a margin of 13%.

=== 2010 redistricting ===
The Washington State Redistricting Commission is charged with adjusting congressional and legislative district boundaries after each decennial census. Given Washington State's growth over the prior decade, Washington gained an additional congressional district for the 113th congress. The third district needed to lose 106,894 people in the redistricting process in order to meet the new ideal population of 672,454. On September 13, 2011, the four voting commissioners on the Redistricting Commission submitted draft proposals for the congressional map. All four draft proposals left the entirety of Lewis, Wahkiakum, Cowlitz, and Clark Counties, and all or most of Skamania county in the 3rd district. In addition, each proposal added population from one or more of Pacific, Thurston, Pierce, or Klickitat counties.

The final approved map for the 3rd district included the entirety of Klickitat, Skamania, Clark, Cowlitz, Wahkiakum, Pacific, and Lewis counties, with the extreme southern part of Thurston County south of highway 12, Washington State Route 507, and the Vail Cut Off Road.

=== 2020 redistricting ===
Following the 2020 census, the 3rd district was slightly changed during redistricting, losing Klickitat county to the 4th district and gaining an additional small sliver of Thurston county from the 10th district. The new 3rd district was marginally more favorable for Republicans, voting for Trump in 2020 by a margin of 4.2%, as opposed to the old district's 3.7%. Despite this, Democratic challenger Marie Gluesenkamp Perez bested Republican nominee Joe Kent by 2,629 votes in 2022. It was one of five districts that would have voted for Donald Trump in the 2020 presidential election had they existed in their current configuration while being won or held by a Democrat in 2022.

Trump won the district in 2024 by a slightly reduced margin of 3.28%, while Gluesenkamp Perez defeated Kent in a rematch by 3.88%, running 7 points ahead of Democratic presidential nominee Kamala Harris.

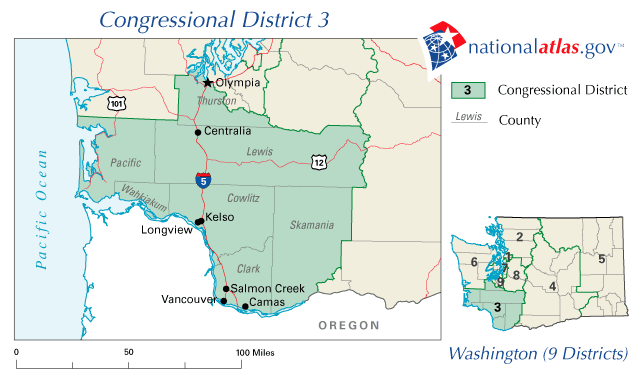
The district from 2003 to 2013

The district from 2013 to 2023

== Recent election results from statewide races ==
Year	Office	Results
2008	President	Obama 51% - 47%
2010	Senate	Rossi 55% - 45%
2012	President	Romney 51% - 49%
2016	President	Trump 50% - 42%
2016	Senate	Vance 51% - 49%
2016	Governor	Bryant 55% - 45%
2016	Lt. Governor	McClendon 56% - 44%
2016	Secretary of State	Wyman 63% - 37%
2016	Auditor	Miloscia 55% - 45%
2018	Senate	Hutchison 51% - 49%
2020	President	Trump 51% - 46%
2020	Governor	Culp 54% - 46%
2020	Secretary of State	Wyman 61% - 39%
2020	Treasurer	Davidson 56% - 44%
2020	Auditor	Leyba 53% - 47%
2020	Attorney General	Larkin 54% - 46%
2022	Senate	Smiley 54% - 46%
2022	Secretary of State (Spec.)	Anderson 53% - 42%
2024	President	Trump 50% - 47%
2024	Senate	Garcia 50% - 49%
2024	Governor	Reichert 54% - 46%
2024	Lt. Governor	Matthews 54% - 46%
2024	Secretary of State	Whitaker 51% - 49%
2024	Treasurer	Hanek 52% - 47%
2024	Auditor	Hawkins 52% - 48%
2024	Attorney General	Serrano 54% - 46%
2024	Commissioner of Public Lands	Herrera Beutler 57% - 42%

== Composition ==
For the 118th and successive Congresses (based on redistricting following the 2020 census), the district contains all or portions of the following counties and communities:

Clark County (27)

All 27 communities

Cowlitz County (10)

All 10 communities

Lewis County (13)

All 13 communities

Pacific County (11)

All 11 communities

Skamania County (3)

All 3 communities

Thurston County (5)

Bucoda, Grand Mound, Rainier, Rochester, Tenino

Wahkiakum County (10)

All 10 communities

== List of members representing the district ==
Member	Party	Term	Cong ress	Electoral history	District location
District established March 4, 1909
Miles Poindexter (Spokane)	Republican	March 4, 1909 – March 3, 1911	61st	Elected in 1908. Retired to run for U.S. senator.	
William La Follette (Pullman)	Republican	March 4, 1911 – March 3, 1915	62nd 63rd	Elected in 1910. Re-elected in 1912. Redistricted to the 4th district.	
Albert Johnson (Hoquiam)	Republican	March 4, 1915 – March 3, 1933	64th 65th 66th 67th 68th 69th 70th 71st 72nd	Redistricted from the 2nd district and re-elected in 1914. Re-elected in 1916. Re-elected in 1918. Re-elected in 1920. Re-elected in 1922. Re-elected in 1924. Re-elected in 1926. Re-elected in 1928. Re-elected in 1930. Lost re-election.	
Martin F. Smith (Hoquiam)	Democratic	March 4, 1933 – January 3, 1943	73rd 74th 75th 76th 77th	Elected in 1932. Re-elected in 1934. Re-elected in 1936. Re-elected in 1938. Re-elected in 1940. Lost re-election.	
Fred B. Norman (Raymond)	Republican	January 3, 1943 – January 3, 1945	78th	Elected in 1942. Lost re-election.	
Charles R. Savage (Shelton)	Democratic	January 3, 1945 – January 3, 1947	79th	Elected in 1944. Lost re-election.	
Fred B. Norman (Raymond)	Republican	January 3, 1947 – April 18, 1947	80th	Elected in 1946. Died.	
Vacant		April 18, 1947 – July 7, 1947	80th		
Russell V. Mack (Hoquiam)	Republican	July 7, 1947 – March 28, 1960	80th 81st 82nd 83rd 84th 85th 86th	Elected to finish Norman's term. Re-elected in 1948. Re-elected in 1950. Re-elected in 1952. Re-elected in 1954. Re-elected in 1956. Re-elected in 1958. Died.	
Vacant		March 28, 1960 – November 8, 1960	86th		
Julia Butler Hansen (Cathlamet)	Democratic	November 8, 1960 – December 31, 1974	86th 87th 88th 89th 90th 91st 92nd 93rd	Elected to finish Mack's term. Also elected to the next term. Re-elected in 1962. Re-elected in 1964. Re-elected in 1966. Re-elected in 1968. Re-elected in 1970. Re-elected in 1972. Retired and resigned early.	
Vacant		December 31, 1974 – January 3, 1975	93rd		
Don Bonker (Vancouver)	Democratic	January 3, 1975 – January 3, 1989	94th 95th 96th 97th 98th 99th 100th	Elected in 1974. Re-elected in 1976. Re-elected in 1978. Re-elected in 1980. Re-elected in 1982. Re-elected in 1984. Re-elected in 1986. Retired.	
Jolene Unsoeld (Olympia)	Democratic	January 3, 1989 – January 3, 1995	101st 102nd 103rd	Elected in 1988. Re-elected in 1990. Re-elected in 1992. Lost re-election.	
Linda Smith (Vancouver)	Republican	January 3, 1995 – January 3, 1999	104th 105th	Elected in 1994. Re-elected in 1996. Retired to run for U.S. senator.	
Brian Baird (Vancouver)	Democratic	January 3, 1999 – January 3, 2011	106th 107th 108th 109th 110th 111th	Elected in 1998. Re-elected in 2000. Re-elected in 2002. Re-elected in 2004. Re-elected in 2006. Re-elected in 2008. Retired.	
Brian Baird (Vancouver)	Democratic	January 3, 1999 – January 3, 2011	106th 107th 108th 109th 110th 111th	Elected in 1998. Re-elected in 2000. Re-elected in 2002. Re-elected in 2004. Re-elected in 2006. Re-elected in 2008. Retired.	2003–2013
Jaime Herrera Beutler (Battle Ground)	Republican	January 3, 2011 – January 3, 2023	112th 113th 114th 115th 116th 117th	Elected in 2010. Re-elected in 2012. Re-elected in 2014. Re-elected in 2016. Re-elected in 2018. Re-elected in 2020. Lost renomination.	2003–2013
Jaime Herrera Beutler (Battle Ground)	Republican	January 3, 2011 – January 3, 2023	112th 113th 114th 115th 116th 117th	Elected in 2010. Re-elected in 2012. Re-elected in 2014. Re-elected in 2016. Re-elected in 2018. Re-elected in 2020. Lost renomination.	2013–2023
Marie Gluesenkamp Perez (Washougal)	Democratic	January 3, 2023 – present	118th 119th	Elected in 2022. Re-elected in 2024. Re-elected in 2026.	2023–present

== Recent election results ==
=== 2010 ===
2010 United States House of Representatives elections in Washington: 3rd district
Party	Candidate	Votes	%
Republican	Jaime Herrera Beutler	152,799	53.0%
Democratic	Denny Heck	135,654	47.0%
Total votes		288,453	100.0%
Republican gain from Democratic			

=== 2012 ===
2012 United States House of Representatives elections in Washington: 3rd district
Party	Candidate	Votes	%
Republican	Jaime Herrera Beutler (Incumbent)	177,446	60.4%
Democratic	Jon T. Haugen	116,438	39.6%
Total votes		293,884	100.0%
Republican hold			

=== 2014 ===
2014 United States House of Representatives elections in Washington: 3rd district
Party	Candidate	Votes	%
Republican	Jaime Herrera Beutler (Incumbent)	124,796	61.5%
Democratic	Bob Dingethal	78,018	38.5%
Total votes		202,814	100.0%
Republican hold			

=== 2016 ===
2016 United States House of Representatives elections in Washington: 3rd district
Party	Candidate	Votes	%
Republican	Jaime Herrera Beutler (Incumbent)	193,457	61.8%
Democratic	Jim Moeller	119,820	38.2%
Total votes		313,277	100.0%
Republican hold			

=== 2018 ===
2018 United States House of Representatives elections in Washington: 3rd district
Party	Candidate	Votes	%
Republican	Jaime Herrera Beutler (Incumbent)	161,819	52.7%
Democratic	Carolyn Long	145,407	47.3%
Total votes		307,226	100.0%
Republican hold			

=== 2020 ===
2020 United States House of Representatives elections in Washington: 3rd district
Party	Candidate	Votes	%
Republican	Jaime Herrera Beutler (Incumbent)	235,579	56.4%
Democratic	Carolyn Long	181,347	43.4%
Write-in		977	0.2
Total votes		417,903	100.0%
Republican hold			

=== 2022 ===
2022 United States House of Representatives elections in Washington: 3rd district
Party	Candidate	Votes	%
Democratic	Marie Gluesenkamp Pérez	160,323	50.1
Republican	Joe Kent	157,690	49.3
Write-in		1,760	0.5
Total votes		319,759	100.0
Democratic gain from Republican			

=== 2024 ===
2024 United States House of Representatives elections in Washington: 3rd district
Party	Candidate	Votes	%
Democratic	Marie Gluesenkamp Pérez	215,177	51.7
Republican	Joe Kent	199,054	47.9
Write-in		1,673	0.4
Total votes		415,904	100.0
Democratic hold			

== See also ==
- 2008 United States House of Representatives elections in Washington
- 2010 United States House of Representatives elections in Washington
- 2012 United States House of Representatives elections in Washington
- 2014 United States House of Representatives elections in Washington
- 2016 United States House of Representatives elections in Washington
- 2018 United States House of Representatives elections in Washington
- 2020 United States House of Representatives elections in Washington
