= Leona Savage Osterman =

American politician

Member of the Washington House of Representatives from the 24th district
- In office February 6, 1976 – January 10, 1977
- Preceded by: Charles R. Savage
- Succeeded by: Brad Owen

Personal details
- Party: Democratic

Leona Savage Osterman was an American politician who served in the Washington State House for the 28th district. She was appointed to the legislature on the death of her father. Her husband was Robert D. Osterman (1936–2012).
