= Charles R. Savage =

American politician

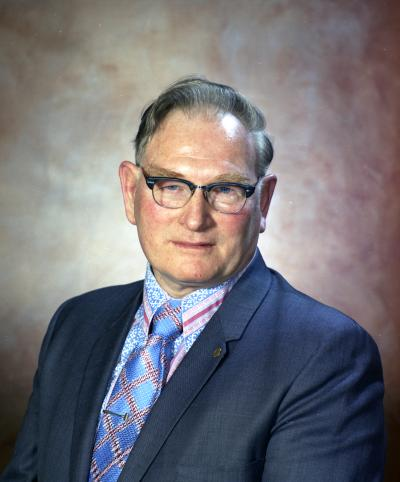
- Savage in 1973

Member of the U.S. House of Representatives from Washington's 3rd district
- In office January 3, 1945 – January 3, 1947
- Preceded by: Fred B. Norman
- Succeeded by: Fred B. Norman

Member of the Washington House of Representatives
- In office 1939–1945; 1951–1959; 1963–1967; 1969–1976

Personal details
- Born: April 12, 1906 La Farge, Wisconsin
- Died: January 14, 1976 (aged 69) Shelton, Washington
- Resting place: Shelton Memorial Park
- Party: Democratic
- Children: Leona Savage Osterman

Charles Raymon Savage (April 12, 1906 – January 14, 1976) was an American politician who was a U.S. Representative from Washington.

Born on a farm at La Farge, Wisconsin, His family moved to Entwisle, Alberta, Ca., around 1913, and returned to the U.S. in Washington around 1927. His family made the year long trip by horse and wagon. Savage attended the public schools. Later, he took special courses in mechanics, building construction, business law and salesmanship. In Washington State and he engaged in building construction and logging.

Savage served as member of the State House of Representatives from 1939 to 1945, from 1951 to 1959, from 1963 to 1967 and again from 1969 until his death in 1976. During his political career, he served twelve times as delegate to State Democratic conventions between 1938 and 1970. In addition, he served as delegate at the Democratic National Convention in 1944.

In between his tenures in the State House of Washington State, Savage was also elected as a Democrat to the Seventy-ninth Congress (January 3, 1945 – January 3, 1947). However, he was an unsuccessful candidate for reelection in 1946 to Congress and also unsuccessful in a special election in June 1947 to Congress as well as for election in 1948 to Congress. He was also an unsuccessful candidate for nomination in 1958.

After Savage dropped out of politics, he continued his logging pursuits. He also served as district manager of an insurance society and engaged in real estate business.

Savage lived most of his life in Shelton, Washington, where he died on January 14, 1976. He was interred in Shelton Memorial Park. His daughter Leona Savage Osterman was appointed to replace him in the legislature.

U.S. House of Representatives
Preceded by Fred B. Norman (R)	Member of the U.S. House of Representatives from Washington's 3rd congressional district January 3, 1945 – January 3, 1947	Succeeded by Fred B. Norman (R)
