= Fred B. Norman =

American politician

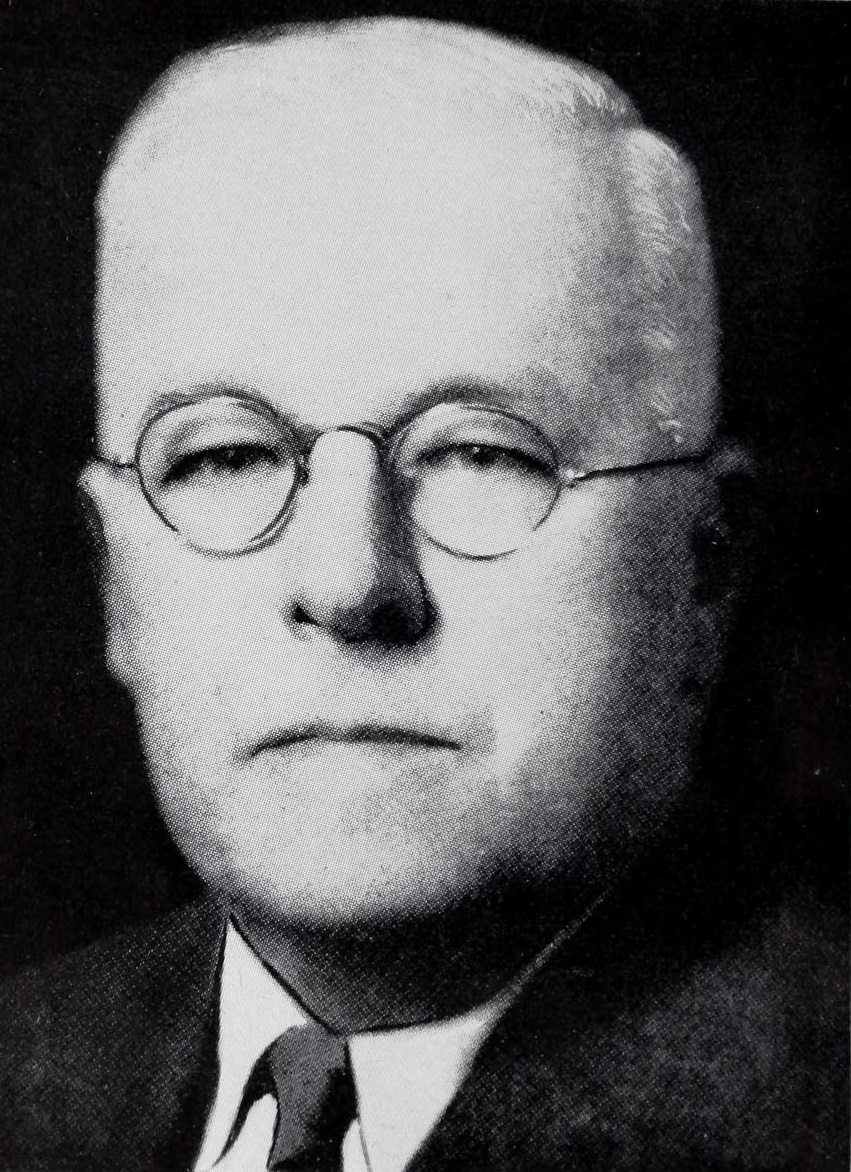
- Frontispiece of 1950s Fred Berthold Norman, Late a Representative.

Member of the U.S. House of Representatives from Washington's 3rd district
- In office January 3, 1943 – January 3, 1945
- Preceded by: Martin Fernard Smith
- Succeeded by: Charles R. Savage
- In office January 3, 1947 – April 18, 1947
- Preceded by: Charles R. Savage
- Succeeded by: Russell Vernon Mack

Member of the Washington Senate
- In office 1925–1935

Member of the Washington House of Representatives
- In office 1919–1920

Personal details
- Born: March 21, 1882 near Martinsville, Illinois
- Died: April 18, 1947 (aged 65) Washington, D.C.
- Party: Republican

Fred Barthold Norman (March 21, 1882 – April 18, 1947) was a U.S. representative from Washington.

Born on a farm near Martinsville, Illinois, Norman attended the public schools and was graduated from Martinsville High School. He moved to Lebam, Washington, in 1901. He worked on farms, in logging camps, sawmills, shingle mills, and shipyards 1901-1922. He engaged in the wholesale and retail tobacco and candy business since 1922. He served as member of the city council of Raymond, Washington from 1916 to 1918. He served in the State house of representatives in 1919 and 1920. He served as member of the State senate 1925-1935.

Norman was elected as a Republican to the Seventy-eighth Congress (January 3, 1943 – January 3, 1945). He was an unsuccessful candidate for reelection in 1944 to the Seventy-ninth Congress.

Norman was elected in 1946 to the Eightieth Congress and served from January 3, 1947, until his death in Washington, D.C., on April 18, 1947. He was interred in Fern Hill Cemetery, Menlo, Washington.

== See also ==
- List of members of the United States Congress who died in office (1900–1949)

== Sources ==
- United States Congress. "Fred B. Norman (id: N000135)". Biographical Directory of the United States Congress.

U.S. House of Representatives
Preceded by Martin F. Smith	Member of the U.S. House of Representatives from Washington's 3rd congressional district 1943-1945	Succeeded by Charles R. Savage
Preceded by Charles R. Savage	Member of the U.S. House of Representatives from Washington's 3rd congressional district 1947	Succeeded by Russell V. Mack
