= Russell V. Mack =

American politician

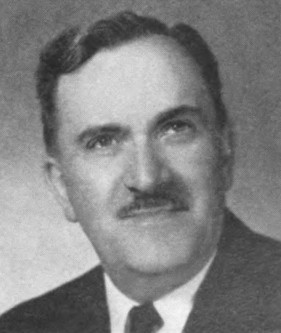

Member of the U.S. House of Representatives from Washington's 3rd district
- In office July 7, 1947 – March 28, 1960
- Preceded by: Fred B. Norman
- Succeeded by: Julia Butler Hansen

Personal details
- Born: June 13, 1891 Hillman, Michigan
- Died: March 28, 1960 (aged 68) Washington, D.C.
- Party: Republican

Russell Vernon Mack (June 13, 1891 – March 28, 1960) served as a member of the United States House of Representatives representing Washington's 3rd congressional district from 1947 to 1960. He was born in 1891, in Hillman, Michigan. Mack moved to Aberdeen, Washington in 1895. Mack was educated at Stanford University in California, and then at the University of Washington in Seattle. Mack served as a corporal in the Thirty-ninth Field Artillery, Thirteenth Division, during World War I. Before serving in Congress, Mack worked in journalism in the Grays Harbor area, first at the Aberdeen Daily World from 1913 to 1934, then as the owner and publisher of the Hoquiam Daily Washingtonian from 1934 to 1950. Mack was the last Republican to serve the 3rd district, until Linda Smith was elected in 1994. Mack died on the floor of the U.S. House of Representatives on March 28, 1960, of cardiac arrest and has a scholarship named after him.

Mack ran unsuccessfully for the U.S. House in 1934 and 1940, before the death of the incumbent in 1947 offered him an opening. Fred Norman had broken the Democratic hold on the district from 1933 until 1943, though Norman had lost in 1942 before winning again in 1944. Mack won and held on with narrow victories until a runaway win in 1954 over a Democrat who admitted a past membership in the Communist Party. Mack looked after his district in his concern for flooding relief, crabbing, and plywood. Hevoted in favor of the Civil Rights Acts of 1957 and 1960.

== See also ==
- List of members of the United States Congress who died in office (1950–1999)

U.S. House of Representatives
Preceded by Fred B. Norman	Member of the U.S. House of Representatives from Washington's 3rd congressional district 1947–1960	Succeeded by Julia B. Hansen
