= 1951 United States House of Representatives elections =

The 1951 United States House of Representatives elections were primarily special elections, and were part of the 1951 United States elections, which included the 1951 United States gubernatorial elections. Two seats changed hands between political parties. Two women were elected to replaced their husbands, who had both died in office. These elections took place during the Korean War.

== List of elections ==
District	Incumbent			This race	
District	Member	Party	First elected	Results	Candidates
Missouri 11	John B. Sullivan	Democratic	1940	Incumbent died January 29, 1951. New member elected March 9, 1951. Republican gain.	▌ ✓ Claude I. Bakewell (Republican) 56.6%; ▌Harry Schendel (Democratic) 43.4%
Kentucky 6	Thomas R. Underwood	Democratic	1948	Incumbent resigned March 17, 1951 when appointed U.S. Senator. New member elected April 4, 1951. Democratic hold.	▌ ✓ John C. Watts (Democratic) 55.3%; ▌Otis C. Thomas (Republican) 44.7%
West Virginia 5	John Kee	Democratic	1932	Incumbent died May 8, 1951. New member elected July 17, 1951 to finish her husband's term. Democratic hold.	▌ ✓ Elizabeth Kee (Democratic) 58.3%; ▌Cyrus H. Gadd (Republican) 41.7%
Pennsylvania 33	Frank Buchanan	Democratic	1946 (special)	Incumbent died April 27, 1951. New member elected July 24, 1951. Democratic hold.	▌ ✓ Vera Buchanan (Democratic) 61.1%; ▌Clifford W. Flegal (Republican) 38.9%
Maine 3	Frank Fellows	Republican	1940	Incumbent died April 27, 1951. New member elected October 22, 1951. Republican hold.	▌ ✓ Clifford McIntire (Republican) 65.8%; ▌Katherine H. Hickson (Democratic) 27.5%; ▌Ralph A. Dyer (Independent) 6.8%
Texas 13	Ed Gossett	Democratic	1938	Incumbent resigned July 31, 1951. New member elected September 8, 1951. Democratic hold.	▌ ✓ Frank N. Ikard (Democratic) 25.8%; ▌Walter Jenkins (Democratic) 19.9%; ▌Joe Jackson (Republican) 18.9%; Misc candidates 35.4%
New Jersey 9	Harry L. Towe	Republican	1942	Incumbent resigned September 7, 1951 to become N.J. Assistant Attorney General. New member elected November 6, 1951. Republican hold.	▌ ✓ Frank C. Osmers Jr. (Republican) 62.6%; ▌Evelyn M. Seufert (Democratic) 37.4%
Ohio 3	Edward G. Breen	Democratic	1948	Incumbent resigned October 1, 1951, due to ill health. New member elected November 6, 1951. Republican gain.	▌ ✓ Paul F. Schenck (Republican) 55.4%; ▌Jesse Yoder (Democratic) 44.6%
Pennsylvania 14	Wilson D. Gillette	Republican	1941 (special)	Incumbent died August 7, 1951. New member elected November 6, 1951. Republican hold.	▌ ✓ Joseph L. Carrigg (Republican) 64.3%; ▌Paul Harris (Democratic) 35.7%
Pennsylvania 8	Albert C. Vaughn	Republican	1950	Incumbent died September 1, 1951. New member elected November 6, 1951. Republican hold.	▌ ✓ Karl C. King (Republican); Unopposed
Nebraska 3	Karl Stefan	Republican	1934	Incumbent died August 7, 1951. New member elected December 4, 1951. Republican hold.	▌ ✓ Bob Harrison (Republican) 70.6%; ▌Carl F. Olson (Democratic) 29.4%

== See also ==
- List of special elections to the United States House of Representatives
