= List of members of the United States Congress who died in office (1950–1999) =

The following is a list of United States senators and representatives who died of natural or accidental causes, or who killed themselves, while serving their terms between 1950 and 1999. For a list of members of Congress who were killed while in office, see List of members of the United States Congress killed or wounded in office.

Party colors: Democratic (D) Republican (R)

== 1950s ==
Member	Party	State (district)	Date of death	Age at death (years)	Cause	Place of death	Place of burial	Successor	Serving since (in the House/Senate)	Date of birth	Place of birth	U.S. Congress
S. Otis Bland	Democratic	Virginia (1st district)	February 16, 1950	77	Cerebral hemorrhage	Bethesda, Maryland	U.S.	Edward J. Robeson Jr.	July 2, 1918	May 4, 1872	Gloucester, Virginia	81st (1949–1951)
Ralph E. Church	Republican	Illinois (13th district)	March 21, 1950	66	Heart attack	Washington, D.C.	U.S.	Marguerite S. Church	January 3, 1943 (previously served January 3, 1935 – January 3, 1941)	May 5, 1883	Vermilion County, Illinois	81st (1949–1951)
John Lesinski Sr.	Democratic	Michigan (16th district)	May 27, 1950	65	Heart attack	Dearborn, Michigan	U.S.	John Lesinski Jr.	March 4, 1933	January 3, 1885	Erie, Pennsylvania	81st (1949–1951)
William Lemke	Republican	North Dakota (at-large district)	May 30, 1950	71	Heart attack	Fargo, North Dakota	U.S.	Fred G. Aandahl	January 3, 1943 (previously served March 4, 1933 – January 3, 1941)	August 13, 1878	Albany, Minnesota	81st (1949–1951)
Alfred L. Bulwinkle	Democratic	North Carolina (11th district)	August 31, 1950	67	Multiple myeloma	Gastonia, North Carolina	U.S.	Woodrow W. Jones	March 4, 1931 (previously served March 4, 1921 – March 3, 1929)	April 21, 1883	Charleston, South Carolina	81st (1949–1951)
Herbert A. Meyer	Republican	Kansas (3rd district)	October 2, 1950	64	Heart attack	Bethesda, Maryland	U.S.	Myron V. George	January 3, 1947	August 30, 1886	Chillicothe, Ohio	81st (1949–1951)
John B. Sullivan	Democratic	Missouri (11th district)	January 29, 1951	53	Cerebral hemorrhage	Bethesda, Maryland	U.S.	Claude I. Bakewell	January 3, 1949 (previously served January 3, 1941 – January 3, 1943, and January 3, 1945 – January 3, 1947)	October 10, 1897	Sedalia, Missouri	82nd (1951–1953)
Virgil Chapman	Democratic	Kentucky (Senator)	March 8, 1951	55	traffic collision	Bethesda, Maryland	U.S.	Thomas R. Underwood	January 3, 1949 (U.S. House tenure March 4, 1925 – March 3, 1929, and March 4, 1931 – January 3, 1949)	March 15, 1895	Middleton, Kentucky	82nd (1951–1953)
Arthur H. Vandenberg	Republican	Michigan (Senator)	April 18, 1951	67	Lung cancer	Grand Rapids, Michigan	U.S.	Blair Moody	March 31, 1928	March 22, 1884	Grand Rapids, Michigan	82nd (1951–1953)
Frank Buchanan	Democratic	Pennsylvania (33rd district)	April 27, 1951	48	Internal hemorrhages	Bethesda, Maryland	U.S.	Vera Buchanan	May 21, 1946	December 1, 1902	McKeesport, Pennsylvania	82nd (1951–1953)
John Kee	Democratic	West Virginia (5th district)	May 8, 1951	76	Heart attack	Washington, D.C.	U.S.	Elizabeth Kee	March 4, 1933	August 22, 1874	Glenville, West Virginia	82nd (1951–1953)
Wilson D. Gillette	Republican	Pennsylvania (14th district)	August 7, 1951	71	Bronchial pneumonia	Towanda, Pennsylvania	U.S.	Joseph L. Carrigg	November 4, 1941	July 1, 1880	Sheshequin Township, Pennsylvania	82nd (1951–1953)
Frank Fellows	Republican	Maine (3rd district)	August 27, 1951	61	Circulatory and abdominal illness	Bangor, Maine	U.S.	Clifford McIntire	January 3, 1941	November 7, 1889	Bucksport, Maine	82nd (1951–1953)
Albert C. Vaughn	Republican	Pennsylvania (8th district)	September 1, 1951	56	Coronary thrombosis	Fullerton, Pennsylvania	U.S.	Karl C. King	January 3, 1951	October 9, 1894	West Catasauqua, Pennsylvania	82nd (1951–1953)
Karl Stefan	Republican	Nebraska (3rd district)	October 2, 1951	67	Acute cardiovascular collapse	Washington, D.C.	U.S.	Robert Dinsmore Harrison	January 3, 1935	March 1, 1884	Zebrakov, Bohemia	82nd (1951–1953)
Kenneth S. Wherry	Republican	Nebraska (Senator)	November 29, 1951	59	Pneumonia	Washington, D.C.	U.S.	Fred A. Seaton	January 3, 1943	February 28, 1892	Liberty, Nebraska	82nd (1951–1953)
John A. Whitaker	Democratic	Kentucky (2nd district)	December 15, 1951	50	Heart attack	Russellville, Kentucky	U.S.	Garrett L. Withers	April 17, 1948	October 31, 1901	Russellville, Kentucky	82nd (1951–1953)
William T. Byrne	Democratic	New York (32nd district)	January 27, 1952	75	Cerebral hemorrhage	Troy, New York	U.S.	Leo W. O'Brien	January 3, 1937	March 6, 1876	Florida, New York	82nd (1951–1953)
George B. Schwabe	Republican	Oklahoma (1st district)	April 2, 1952	65	Heart attack	Alexandria, Virginia	U.S.	Page Belcher	January 3, 1951 (previously served January 3, 1945 – January 3, 1949)	July 26, 1886	Arthur, Missouri	82nd (1951–1953)
Reid F. Murray	Republican	Wisconsin (7th district)	April 29, 1952	64	Nephritis	Bethesda, Maryland	U.S.	Melvin Laird	January 3, 1939	October 16, 1887	Ogdensburg, Wisconsin	82nd (1951–1953)
Brien McMahon	Democratic	Connecticut (Senator)	July 28, 1952	48	Lung cancer	Washington, D.C.	U.S.	William A. Purtell	January 3, 1945	October 6, 1903	Norwalk, Connecticut	82nd (1951–1953)
William G. Stigler	Democratic	Oklahoma (2nd district)	August 21, 1952	61	Extended Illness	Stigler, Oklahoma	U.S.	Ed Edmondson	March 28, 1944	July 7, 1891	Stigler, Oklahoma	82nd (1951–1953)
Adolph J. Sabath	Democratic	Illinois (7th district)	November 6, 1952	86	Liver disease	Bethesda, Maryland	U.S.	James B. Bowler	March 4, 1907	April 4, 1866	Zabori, Czechoslovakia	82nd (1951–1953)
E. Eugene Cox	Democratic	Georgia (2nd district)	December 24, 1952	72	Heart disease	Bethesda, Maryland	U.S.	J. L. Pilcher	March 4, 1925	April 3, 1880	Camilla, Georgia	82nd (1951–1953)
Joseph R. Bryson	Democratic	South Carolina (4th district)	March 10, 1953	60	Cerebral Hemorrhage	Bethesda, Maryland	U.S.	Robert T. Ashmore	January 3, 1939	January 18, 1893	Brevard, North Carolina	83rd (1953–1955)
Garrett L. Withers	Democratic	Kentucky (2nd district)	April 30, 1953	68	Cerebral hemorrhage	Bethesda, Maryland	U.S.	William H. Natcher	August 2, 1952 (U.S. Senate tenure January 20, 1949 – November 26, 1950)	June 21, 1884	Clay, Kentucky	83rd (1953–1955)
Merlin Hull	Republican	Wisconsin (9th district)	May 17, 1953	82	Pulmonary complications following surgery	La Crosse, Wisconsin	U.S.	Lester Johnson	January 3, 1935 (previously served March 4, 1929 – March 3, 1931)	December 18, 1870	Farina, Illinois	83rd (1953–1955)
Willis Smith	Democratic	North Carolina (Senator)	June 26, 1953	65	Coronary thrombosis	Bethesda, Maryland	U.S.	Alton Lennon	November 27, 1950	December 19, 1887	Norfolk, Virginia	83rd (1953–1955)
Charles W. Tobey	Republican	New Hampshire (Senator)	July 24, 1953	73	Coronary thrombosis	Bethesda, Maryland	U.S.	Robert W. Upton	January 3, 1939 (U.S. House tenure March 4, 1933 – January 3, 1939)	July 22, 1880	Roxbury, Massachusetts	83rd (1953–1955)
Robert A. Taft	Republican	Ohio (Senator)	July 31, 1953	63	Cerebral hemorrhage	New York City, New York	U.S.	Thomas A. Burke	January 3, 1939	September 8, 1889	Cincinnati, Ohio	83rd (1953–1955)
Dwight Griswold	Republican	Nebraska (Senator)	April 12, 1954	60	Heart attack	Bethesda, Maryland	U.S.	Eva Bowring	November 5, 1952	November 27, 1893	Harrison, Nebraska	83rd (1953–1955)
Clyde R. Hoey	Democratic	North Carolina (Senator)	May 12, 1954	76	Stroke	Washington, D.C.	U.S.	Sam Ervin	January 3, 1945 (U.S. House tenure December 16, 1919 – March 3, 1921)	December 11, 1877	Shelby, North Carolina	83rd (1953–1955)
Lester C. Hunt	Democratic	Wyoming (Senator)	June 19, 1954	61	Suicide by firearm	Washington, D.C.	U.S.	Edward D. Crippa	January 3, 1949	July 8, 1892	Isabel, Illinois	83rd (1953–1955)
Joseph Rider Farrington	Republican	Hawaii (delegate)	June 19, 1954	56	Heart attack	Washington, D.C.	U.S.	Elizabeth P. Farrington	January 3, 1943	October 15, 1897	Washington, D.C., U.S.	83rd (1953–1955)
Hugh A. Butler	Republican	Nebraska (Senator)	July 1, 1954	76	Stroke	Bethesda, Maryland	U.S.	Samuel W. Reynolds	January 3, 1941	February 28, 1878	Missouri Valley, Iowa	83rd (1953–1955)
A. Sidney Camp	Democratic	Georgia (4th district)	July 24, 1954	61	Liver ailment	Bethesda, Maryland	U.S.	John James Flynt Jr.	August 1, 1939	July 26, 1892	Moreland, Georgia	83rd (1953–1955)
Paul W. Shafer	Republican	Michigan (3rd district)	August 17, 1954	61	Liver disease	Washington, D.C.	U.S.	August E. Johansen	January 3, 1937	April 27, 1893	Elkhart, Indiana	83rd (1953–1955)
Burnet R. Maybank	Democratic	South Carolina (Senator)	September 1, 1954	55	Heart attack	Flat Rock, North Carolina	U.S.	Charles E. Daniel	November 5, 1941	March 7, 1899	Charleston, South Carolina	83rd (1953–1955)
Pat McCarran	Democratic	Nevada (Senator)	September 28, 1954	78	Heart attack	Hawthorne, Nevada	U.S.	Ernest S. Brown	March 4, 1933	August 8, 1876	Reno, Nevada	83rd (1953–1955)
Dwight L. Rogers	Democratic	Florida (6th district)	December 1, 1954	68	Heart attack	Fort Lauderdale, Florida	U.S.	Paul Rogers	January 3, 1945	August 17, 1886	Reidsville, Georgia	83rd (1953–1955)
John Dingell Sr.	Democratic	Michigan (15th district)	September 19, 1955	61	Heart attack	Washington, D.C.	U.S.	John D. Dingell Jr.	March 4, 1933	February 2, 1894	Detroit, Michigan	84th (1955–1957)
Vera Buchanan	Democratic	Pennsylvania (30th district)	November 26, 1955	53	Cancer	McKeesport, Pennsylvania	U.S.	Elmer J. Holland	July 24, 1951	July 20, 1902	Wilson, Pennsylvania	84th (1955–1957)
Chauncey W. Reed	Democratic	Illinois (14th district)	February 9, 1956	65	Gastro-intestinal related chronic illness	Bethesda, Maryland	U.S.	Russell W. Keeney	January 3, 1935	June 2, 1890	West Chicago, Illinois	84th (1955–1957)
Harley M. Kilgore	Democratic	West Virginia (Senator)	February 28, 1956	63	Cerebral hemorrhage	Bethesda, Maryland	U.S.	William R. Laird, III	January 3, 1941	January 11, 1893	Brown, West Virginia	84th (1955–1957)
Alben W. Barkley	Democratic	Kentucky (Senator)	April 30, 1956	78	Heart attack	Lexington, Virginia	U.S.	Robert Humphreys	January 3, 1955 (previously served March 4, 1927 – January 19, 1949; U.S. House tenure March 4, 1913 – March 3, 1927)	November 24, 1877	Lowes, Kentucky	84th (1955–1957)
William T. Granahan	Democratic	Pennsylvania (2nd district)	May 25, 1956	61	Heart seizure following a minor abdominal surgery	Darby, Pennsylvania	U.S.	Kathryn E. Granahan	January 3, 1949 (previously served January 3, 1945 – January 3, 1947)	July 26, 1895	Philadelphia, Pennsylvania	84th (1955–1957)
John Carl Hinshaw	Republican	California (20th district)	August 5, 1956	62	Pneumonia complicated by congestive heart failure	Bethesda, Maryland	U.S.	H. Allen Smith	January 3, 1939	July 28, 1894	Chicago, Illinois	84th (1955–1957)
Percy Priest	Democratic	Tennessee (5th district)	October 12, 1956	56	Complications following surgery for ulcer	Nashville, Tennessee	U.S.	J. Carlton Loser	January 3, 1941	April 1, 1900	Maury County, Tennessee	84th (1955–1957)
Antonio M. Fernández	Democratic	New Mexico (at-large)	November 7, 1956	54	Complications following stroke	Albuquerque, New Mexico	U.S.	Joseph Montoya	January 3, 1943	January 17, 1902	Springer, New Mexico	84th (1955–1957)
T. Millet Hand	Republican	New Jersey (2nd district)	December 26, 1956	54	Heart attack	Cold Spring, New Jersey	U.S.	Milton W. Glenn	January 3, 1945	July 7, 1902	Cape May, New Jersey	84th (1955–1957)
Joe McCarthy	Republican	Wisconsin (Senator)	May 2, 1957	48	Acute hepatitis	Bethesda, Maryland	U.S.	William Proxmire	January 3, 1947	November 14, 1908	Grand Chute, Wisconsin	85th (1957–1959)
James Bowler	Democratic	Illinois (7th district)	July 18, 1957	82	Complications from arthritis	Des Plaines, Illinois	U.S.	Roland V. Libonati	July 7, 1953	February 5, 1875	Chicago, Illinois	85th (1957–1959)
Henderson Lovelace Lanham	Democratic	Georgia (7th district)	November 10, 1957	69	Traffic collision with train	Rome, Georgia	U.S.	Harlan Erwin Mitchell	January 3, 1947	September 14, 1888	Rome, Georgia	85th (1957–1959)
Augustine B. Kelley	Democratic	Pennsylvania (21st district)	November 20, 1957	74	Cancer	Bethesda, Maryland	U.S.	John Herman Dent	January 3, 1941	July 9, 1883	New Baltimore, Pennsylvania	85th (1957–1959)
Jere Cooper	Democratic	Tennessee (8th district)	December 18, 1957	64	Heart attack	Bethesda, Maryland	U.S.	Fats Everett	March 4, 1929	July 20, 1893	Dyer County, Tennessee	85th (1957–1959)
Russell W. Keeney	Republican	Illinois (14th district)	January 11, 1958	60	Chronic bladder ailment	Bethesda, Maryland	U.S.	Elmer J. Hoffman	January 3, 1957	December 29, 1897	Pittsfield, Illinois	85th (1957–1959)
August H. Andresen	Republican	Minnesota (1st district)	January 14, 1958	67	Heart attack	Bethesda, Maryland	U.S.	Al Quie	January 3, 1935 (previously served March 4, 1925 – March 3, 1933)	October 11, 1890	Newark, Illinois	85th (1957–1959)
Matthew M. Neely	Democratic	West Virginia (Senator)	January 18, 1958	83	Cancer	Washington, D.C.	U.S.	John D. Hoblitzell Jr.	January 3, 1949 (U.S. House tenure October 14, 1913 – March 3, 1921, and January 3, 1945 – January 3, 1947; previously served March 4, 1923 – March 4, 1929, and March 4, 1931 – January 12, 1941)	November 9, 1874	Grove, West Virginia	85th (1957–1959)
Lawrence H. Smith	Republican	Wisconsin (1st district)	January 22, 1958	65	Heart attack	Washington, D.C.	U.S.	Gerald T. Flynn	August 29, 1941	September 15, 1892	Racine, Wisconsin	85th (1957–1959)
John J. Dempsey	Democratic	New Mexico (at-large)	March 11, 1958	78	Viral infection	Washington, D.C.	U.S.	Thomas G. Morris	January 3, 1951 (previously served January 3, 1935 – January 3, 1941)	June 22, 1879	White Haven, Pennsylvania	85th (1957–1959)
George S. Long	Democratic	Louisiana (8th district)	March 22, 1958	74	Complications following heart attack	Bethesda, Maryland	U.S.	Harold McSween	January 3, 1953	September 11, 1883	West Feliciana Parish, Louisiana	85th (1957–1959)
W. Kerr Scott	Democratic	North Carolina (Senator)	April 16, 1958	61	Heart attack	Burlington, North Carolina	U.S.	B. Everett Jordan	November 29, 1954	April 17, 1896	Haw River, North Carolina	85th (1957–1959)
William E. McVey	Republican	Illinois (4th district)	August 10, 1958	72	Heart attack	Washington, D.C.	U.S.	Ed Derwinski	January 3, 1951	December 13, 1885	Clinton County, Ohio	85th (1957–1959)
Herman P. Eberharter	Democratic	Pennsylvania (28th district)	September 9, 1958	66	Stroke	Arlington, Virginia	U.S.	William S. Moorhead	January 3, 1937	April 29, 1892	Pittsburgh, Pennsylvania	85th (1957–1959)
J. Harry McGregor	Republican	Ohio (17th district)	October 7, 1958	62	Heart attack	Coshocton, Ohio	U.S.	Robert W. Levering	February 27, 1940	September 30, 1896	Unionport, Ohio	85th (1957–1959)
Sid Simpson	Republican	Illinois (20th district)	October 26, 1958	64	Heart attack	Pittsfield, Illinois	U.S.	Edna O. Simpson	January 3, 1943	September 20, 1894	Carrollton, Illinois	85th (1957–1959)
George H. Christopher	Democratic	Missouri (4th district)	January 23, 1959	70	Heart attack	Washington, D.C.	U.S.	William J. Randall	January 3, 1955 (previously served January 3, 1949 – January 3, 1951)	December 9, 1888	Butler, Missouri	86th (1959–1961)
Daniel A. Reed	Republican	New York (43rd district)	February 19, 1959	83	Heart attack	Washington, D.C.	U.S.	Charles E. Goodell	March 4, 1919	September 17, 1875	Sheridan, New York	86th (1959–1961)
James G. Polk	Democratic	Ohio (6th district)	April 28, 1959	62	Cancer	Washington, D.C.	U.S.	Ward Miller	January 3, 1949 (previously served March 4, 1931 – January 3, 1941)	October 6, 1896	Highland County, Ohio	86th (1959–1961)
Charles A. Boyle	Democratic	Illinois (12th district)	November 4, 1959	52	Traffic collision	Chicago, Illinois	U.S.	Edward R. Finnegan	January 3, 1955	August 13, 1907	Spring Lake, Michigan	86th (1959–1961)
Steven V. Carter	Democratic	Iowa (4th district)	November 4, 1959	44	Cancer	Bethesda, Maryland	U.S.	John Henry Kyl	January 3, 1959	October 8, 1915	Carterville, Utah	86th (1959–1961)
Alvin Bush	Republican	Pennsylvania (17th district)	November 5, 1959	66	Heart attack	Williamsport, Pennsylvania	U.S.	Herman T. Schneebeli	January 3, 1951	June 4, 1893	Boggs Township, Pennsylvania	86th (1959–1961)
William Langer	Republican	North Dakota (Senator)	November 8, 1959	73	Heart failure	Washington, D.C.	U.S.	Clarence Norman Brunsdale	January 3, 1941	September 30, 1886	Casselton, North Dakota	86th (1959–1961)

== 1960s ==
Member	Party	State (district)	Date of death	Age at death (years)	Cause	Place of death	Place of burial	Successor	Serving since (in the House/Senate)	Date of birth	Place of birth	U.S. Congress
Richard M. Simpson	Republican	Pennsylvania (18th district)	January 7, 1960	59	Complications following surgery to remove brain tumor	Bethesda, Maryland	U.S.	Douglas H. Elliott	May 12, 1937	August 30, 1900	Huntingdon, Pennsylvania	86th (1959–1961)
David M. Hall	Democratic	North Carolina (12th district)	January 29, 1960	41	Bladder cancer	Sylva, North Carolina	U.S.	Roy A. Taylor	January 3, 1959	May 16, 1918	Sylva, North Carolina	86th (1959–1961)
Richard L. Neuberger	Democratic	Oregon (Senator)	March 9, 1960	47	Cerebral hemorrhage	Portland, Oregon	U.S.	Hall S. Lusk	January 3, 1955	December 26, 1912	Multnomah County, Oregon	86th (1959–1961)
Russell V. Mack	Republican	Washington (3rd district)	March 28, 1960	68	Heart attack	Washington, D.C.	U.S.	Julia Butler Hansen	July 7, 1947	June 13, 1891	Hillman, Michigan	86th (1959–1961)
Douglas H. Elliott	Republican	Pennsylvania (18th district)	June 19, 1960	39	Suicide by carbon monoxide poisoning	Horse Valley, Pennsylvania	U.S.	Irving Whalley	April 26, 1960	June 3, 1921	Philadelphia, Pennsylvania	86th (1959–1961)
Edith Nourse Rogers	Republican	Massachusetts (5th district)	September 10, 1960	79	Heart attack	Boston, Massachusetts	U.S.	F. Bradford Morse	June 30, 1925	March 19, 1881	Saco, Maine	86th (1959–1961)
Thomas C. Hennings Jr.	Democratic	Missouri (Senator)	September 13, 1960	57	Stomach cancer	Washington, D.C.	U.S.	Edward V. Long	January 3, 1951 (U.S. House tenure January 3, 1935 – December 31, 1940)	June 25, 1903	St. Louis, Missouri	86th (1959–1961)
Edwin K. Thomson	Republican	Wyoming (at-large district)	December 9, 1960	41	Heart attack	Cody, Wyoming	U.S.	William H. Harrison	January 3, 1955	February 8, 1919	Newcastle, Wyoming	86th (1959–1961)
William F. Norrell	Democratic	Arkansas (6th district)	February 15, 1961	64	Stroke	Washington, D.C.	U.S.	Catherine Dorris Norrell	January 3, 1939	August 29, 1896	Milo, Arkansas	87th (1961–1963)
Walter M. Mumma	Republican	Pennsylvania (16th district)	February 25, 1961	70	Stroke	Bethesda, Maryland	U.S.	John C. Kunkel	January 3, 1951	November 20, 1890	Steelton, Pennsylvania	87th (1961–1963)
B. Carroll Reece	Republican	Tennessee (1st district)	March 19, 1961	71	Lung cancer	Bethesda, Maryland	U.S.	Louise Reece	January 3, 1951 (previously served March 4, 1921 – March 3, 1931, and March 4, 1933 – January 3, 1947)	December 22, 1889	Butler, Tennessee	87th (1961–1963)
Overton Brooks	Democratic	Louisiana (4th district)	September 16, 1961	63	Heart attack	Bethesda, Maryland	U.S.	Joe Waggonner	January 3, 1937	December 21, 1897	Baton Rouge, Louisiana	87th (1961–1963)
Louis C. Rabaut	Democratic	Michigan (14th district)	November 12, 1961	74	Heart attack	Hamtramck, Michigan	U.S.	Harold M. Ryan	January 3, 1949 (previously served January 3, 1935 – January 3, 1947)	December 5, 1886	Detroit, Michigan	87th (1961–1963)
Sam Rayburn	Democratic	Texas (4th district)	November 16, 1961	79	Cancer	Bonham, Texas	U.S.	Ray Roberts	March 4, 1913	January 6, 1882	Kingston, Tennessee	87th (1961–1963)
Styles Bridges	Republican	New Hampshire (Senator)	November 26, 1961	63	Complications following heart attack	Concord, New Hampshire	U.S.	Maurice J. Murphy Jr.	January 3, 1937	September 9, 1898	Pembroke, Maine	87th (1961–1963)
John J. Riley	Democratic	South Carolina (2nd district)	January 1, 1962	66	Coronary thrombosis	Myrtle Beach, South Carolina	U.S.	Corinne Boyd Riley	January 3, 1951 (previously served January 3, 1945 – January 3, 1947)	February 1, 1895	Orangeburg, South Carolina	87th (1961–1963)
Andrew F. Schoeppel	Republican	Kansas (Senator)	January 21, 1962	67	Stomach Cancer	Bethesda, Maryland	U.S.	James B. Pearson	January 3, 1949	November 23, 1894	Barton County, Kansas	87th (1961–1963)
Francis H. Case	Republican	South Dakota (Senator)	June 22, 1962	65	Heart attack	Bethesda, Maryland	U.S.	Joseph H. Bottum	January 3, 1951 (U.S. House tenure January 3, 1937 – January 3, 1951)	December 9, 1896	Everly, Iowa	87th (1961–1963)
Henry Dworshak	Republican	Idaho (Senator)	July 23, 1962	67	Heart attack	Washington, D.C.	U.S.	Len Jordan	October 14, 1949 (previously served November 7, 1946 – January 3, 1949; U.S House tenure January 3, 1939 – November 7, 1946)	August 29, 1894	Duluth, Minnesota	87th (1961–1963)
Clement W. Miller	Democratic	California (1st district)	October 7, 1962	45	Plane crash	Eureka, California	U.S.	Don H. Clausen	January 3, 1949	October 28, 1916	Wilmington, Delaware	87th (1961–1963)
Dennis Chávez	Democratic	New Mexico (Senator)	November 18, 1962	74	Heart attack	Los Chaves, New Mexico	U.S.	Edwin L. Mechem	May 11, 1935 (U.S. House tenure March 4, 1931 – January 3, 1935)	April 8, 1888	Los Chaves, New Mexico Territory	87th (1961–1963)
Robert S. Kerr	Democratic	Oklahoma (Senator)	January 1, 1963	66	Coronary thrombosis	Washington, D.C.	U.S.	J. Howard Edmondson	January 3, 1949	September 11, 1896	Ada, Oklahoma	87th (1961–1963)
Clyde Doyle	Democratic	California (23rd district)	March 14, 1963	75	Natural causes	Arlington, Virginia	U.S.	Del M. Clawson	January 3, 1949 (previously served January 3, 1945 – January 3, 1947)	July 11, 1887	Oakland, California	88th (1963–1965)
Francis E. Walter	Democratic	Pennsylvania (15th district)	May 31, 1963	69	Leukemia	Washington, D.C.	U.S.	Fred B. Rooney	March 4, 1933	May 26, 1894	Easton, Pennsylvania	88th (1963–1965)
Hjalmar C. Nygaard	Republican	North Dakota (1st district)	July 18, 1963	57	Heart attack	Washington, D.C.	U.S.	Mark Andrews	January 3, 1961	March 24, 1906	Sharon, North Dakota	88th (1963–1965)
Estes Kefauver	Democratic	Tennessee (Senator)	August 10, 1963	60	Heart attack	Bethesda, Maryland	U.S.	Herbert S. Walters	January 3, 1949 (U.S. House tenure September 13, 1939 – January 3, 1949)	July 26, 1903	Madisonville, Tennessee	88th (1963–1965)
Leon H. Gavin	Republican	Pennsylvania (23rd district)	September 15, 1963	70	Cerebral hemorrhage	Washington, D.C.	U.S.	Albert W. Johnson	January 3, 1943	February 25, 1893	Buffalo, New York	88th (1963–1965)
Bill Green Jr.	Democratic	Pennsylvania (5th district)	December 21, 1963	53	Peritonitis and gall bladder complications	Philadelphia, Pennsylvania	U.S.	Bill Green, III	January 3, 1949 (previously served January 3, 1945 – January 3, 1947)	March 5, 1910	Philadelphia, Pennsylvania	88th (1963–1965)
Howard Baker	Republican	Tennessee (2nd district)	January 7, 1964	61	Heart attack	Knoxville, Tennessee	U.S.	Irene Bailey Baker	January 3, 1951	January 12, 1902	Somerset, Kentucky	88th (1963–1965)
Thomas J. O'Brien	Democratic	Illinois (6th district)	April 14, 1964	85	Stroke	Chicago, Illinois	U.S.	Daniel J. Ronan	January 3, 1943 (previously served March 4, 1933 – January 3, 1939)	April 30, 1878	Bethesda, Maryland	88th (1963–1965)
Clarence Cannon	Democratic	Missouri (9th district)	May 12, 1964	85	Heart failure	Washington, D.C.	U.S.	William L. Hungate	March 4, 1923	April 11, 1879	Elsberry, Missouri	88th (1963–1965)
Clair Engle	Democratic	California (Senator)	July 30, 1964	52	Complications following surgery to remove brain tumor	Washington, D.C.	U.S.	Pierre Salinger	January 3, 1959 (U.S. House tenure August 31, 1943 – January 3, 1959)	September 21, 1911	Bakersfield, California	88th (1963–1965)
John B. Bennett	Republican	Michigan (12th district)	August 9, 1964	60	Cancer	Chevy Chase, Maryland	U.S.	James G. O'Hara	January 3, 1947 (previously served January 3, 1943 – January 3, 1945)	January 10, 1904	Garden, Michigan	88th (1963–1965)
A. Walter Norblad	Republican	Oregon (1st district)	September 20, 1964	56	Heart attack	Bethesda, Maryland	U.S.	Wendell Wyatt	January 18, 1946	September 12, 1908	Escanaba, Michigan	88th (1963–1965)
Olin D. Johnston	Democratic	South Carolina (Senator)	April 18, 1965	68	Pneumonia	Columbia, South Carolina	U.S.	Donald S. Russell	January 3, 1945	November 18, 1896	Honea Path, South Carolina	89th (1965–1967)
T. Ashton Thompson	Democratic	Louisiana (7th district)	July 1, 1965	49	Traffic collision	Gastonia, North Carolina	U.S.	Edwin Washington Edwards	January 3, 1953	March 31, 1916	Ville Platte, Louisiana	89th (1965–1967)
Clarence J. Brown	Republican	Ohio (7th district)	August 23, 1965	72	Uremic poisoning due to kidney failure	Bethesda, Maryland	U.S.	Bud Brown	January 3, 1939	July 14, 1893	Blanchester, Ohio	89th (1965–1967)
Herbert C. Bonner	Democratic	North Carolina (1st district)	November 7, 1965	74	Cancer	Washington, D.C.	U.S.	Walter B. Jones Sr.	November 5, 1940	May 16, 1891	Washington, North Carolina	89th (1965–1967)
Albert Thomas	Democratic	Texas (8th district)	February 15, 1966	67	Cancer	Washington, D.C.	U.S.	Lera Millard Thomas	January 3, 1937	April 12, 1898	Nacogdoches, Texas	89th (1965–1967)
John F. Baldwin Jr.	Republican	California (14th district)	March 9, 1966	50	Cancer	Bethesda, Maryland	U.S.	Jerome R. Waldie	January 3, 1955	June 28, 1915	Oakland, California	89th (1965–1967)
Patrick V. McNamara	Democratic	Michigan (Senator)	April 30, 1966	71	Stroke	Bethesda, Maryland	U.S.	Robert P. Griffin	January 3, 1955	October 4, 1894	North Weymouth, Massachusetts	89th (1965–1967)
John E. Fogarty	Democratic	Rhode Island (2nd district)	January 10, 1967	53	Heart attack	Washington, D.C.	U.S.	Robert Tiernan	January 3, 1941	March 23, 1913	Providence, Rhode Island	90th (1967–1969)
J. Arthur Younger	Republican	California (11th district)	June 20, 1967	74	Leukemia	Washington, D.C.	U.S.	Pete McCloskey	January 3, 1953	April 11, 1893	Albany, Oregon	90th (1967–1969)
Robert F. Kennedy	Democratic	New York (Senator)	June 6, 1968	42	Assassination	Los Angeles, California	U.S.	Charles Goodell	January 3, 1965	November 20, 1925	Brookline, Massachusetts	90th (1967–1969)
Joe R. Pool	Democratic	Texas (3rd district)	July 14, 1968	57	Heart attack	Houston, Texas	U.S.	James M. Collins	January 3, 1963	February 18, 1911	Fort Worth, Texas	90th (1967–1969)
Elmer J. Holland	Democratic	Pennsylvania (20th district)	August 9, 1968	74	Heart attack	Annapolis, Maryland	U.S.	Joseph M. Gaydos	January 24, 1956 (previously served May 19, 1942 – January 3, 1943)	January 8, 1894	Pittsburgh, Pennsylvania	90th (1967–1969)
Bob Bartlett	Democratic	Alaska (Senator)	December 11, 1968	64	Internal hemorrhage following heart surgery	Cleveland, Ohio	U.S.	Ted Stevens	January 3, 1959 (U.S. House tenure as a delegate January 3, 1945 – January 3, 1959)	April 20, 1904	Seattle, Washington	90th (1967–1969)
Fats Everett	Democratic	Tennessee (8th district)	January 26, 1969	53	Pneumonia and flu complications	Nashville, Tennessee	U.S.	Ed Jones	February 1, 1958	February 24, 1915	Union City, Tennessee	91st (1969–1971)
William H. Bates	Republican	Massachusetts (6th district)	June 22, 1969	52	Stomach cancer	Bethesda, Maryland	U.S.	Michael J. Harrington	February 14, 1950	April 26, 1917	Salem, Massachusetts	91st (1969–1971)
Daniel J. Ronan	Democratic	Illinois (6th district)	August 13, 1969	55	Heart attack	Chicago, Illinois	U.S.	George W. Collins	January 3, 1965	July 13, 1914	Chicago, Illinois	91st (1969–1971)
Everett Dirksen	Republican	Illinois (Senator)	September 7, 1969	73	Cardiopulmonary arrest	Washington, D.C.	U.S.	Ralph Tyler Smith	January 3, 1951 (U.S. House tenure March 4, 1933 – January 3, 1949)	January 4, 1896	Pekin, Illinois	91st (1969–1971)

== 1970s ==
Member	Party	State (district)	Date of death	Age at death (years)	Cause	Place of death	Place of burial	Successor	Serving since (in the House/Senate)	Date of birth	Place of birth	U.S. Congress
Glenard P. Lipscomb	Republican	California (24th district)	February 1, 1970	54	Complications following surgery to remove intestinal tumor	Bethesda, Maryland	U.S.	John H. Rousselot	November 10, 1953	August 19, 1915	Jackson County, Michigan	91st (1969–1971)
James B. Utt	Republican	California (35th district)	March 1, 1970	70	Heart attack	Bethesda, Maryland	U.S.	John G. Schmitz	January 3, 1953	March 11, 1899	Tustin, California	91st (1969–1971)
William St. Onge	Democratic	Connecticut (2nd district)	May 1, 1970	55	Heart attack	Groton, Connecticut	U.S.	Robert H. Steele	January 3, 1963	October 9, 1914	Putnam, Connecticut	91st (1969–1971)
Michael J. Kirwan	Democratic	Ohio (19th district)	July 27, 1970	83	Complications following fall	Bethesda, Maryland	U.S.	Charles J. Carney	January 3, 1937	December 2, 1886	Wilkes-Barre, Pennsylvania	91st (1969–1971)
G. Robert Watkins	Republican	Pennsylvania (9th district)	August 7, 1970	68	Heart attack	West Chester, Pennsylvania	U.S.	John Ware	January 3, 1965	May 21, 1902	Hampton, Virginia	91st (1969–1971)
William L. Dawson	Democratic	Illinois (1st district)	November 9, 1970	84	Pneumonia	Chicago, Illinois	U.S.	Ralph H. Metcalfe (Note: Dawson was not a candidate for re-election in 1970. Metcalfe won the general election for the seat six days before Dawson's death.)	January 3, 1943	April 26, 1886	Albany, Georgia	91st (1969–1971)
L. Mendel Rivers	Democratic	South Carolina (1st district)	December 28, 1970	65	Complications following heart valve replacement	Birmingham, Alabama	U.S.	Mendel Jackson Davis	January 3, 1941	September 28, 1905	Gumville, South Carolina	91st (1969–1971)
Richard Russell Jr.	Democratic	Georgia (Senator)	January 21, 1971	73	Emphysema	Washington, D.C.	U.S.	David H. Gambrell	January 12, 1933	November 2, 1897	Winder, Georgia	92nd (1971–1973)
Robert J. Corbett	Republican	Pennsylvania (18th district)	April 25, 1971	65	Heart attack	Pittsburgh, Pennsylvania	U.S.	John Heinz	January 3, 1945 (previously served January 3, 1939 – January 3, 1941)	August 25, 1905	Avalon, Pennsylvania	92nd (1971–1973)
Winston L. Prouty	Republican	Vermont (Senator)	September 10, 1971	65	Gastric cancer	Boston, Massachusetts	U.S.	Robert T. Stafford	January 3, 1959 (U.S. House tenure January 3, 1951 – January 3, 1959)	September 1, 1906	Newport, Vermont	92nd (1971–1973)
John C. Watts	Democratic	Kentucky (6th district)	September 24, 1971	69	Stroke	Lexington, Kentucky	U.S.	William P. Curlin Jr.	April 4, 1951	July 9, 1902	Nicholasville, Kentucky	92nd (1971–1973)
James G. Fulton	Republican	Pennsylvania (27th district)	October 6, 1971	68	Heart attack	Washington, D.C.	U.S.	William Sheldrick Conover	January 3, 1945	March 1, 1903	Dormont, Pennsylvania	92nd (1971–1973)
George W. Andrews	Democratic	Alabama (3rd district)	December 25, 1971	65	Complications following heart surgery	Birmingham, Alabama	U.S.	Elizabeth B. Andrews	March 14, 1944	December 12, 1906	Clayton, Alabama	92nd (1971–1973)
Allen J. Ellender	Democratic	Louisiana (Senator)	July 27, 1972	81	Heart attack	Maryland	U.S.	Elaine Edwards	January 3, 1937	September 24, 1890	Montegut, Louisiana	92nd (1971–1973)
William F. Ryan	Democratic	New York (20th district)	September 17, 1972	50	Throat cancer	New York City, New York	U.S.	Bella Abzug	January 3, 1961	June 28, 1922	Albion, New York	92nd (1971–1973)
Nick Begich	Democratic	Alaska (at-large district)	October 16, 1972	40	Presumably killed in plane crash	Alaska	U.S.	Don Young	January 3, 1971	April 6, 1932	Eveleth, Minnesota	92nd (1971–1973)
Hale Boggs	Democratic	Louisiana (2nd district)	October 16, 1972	58	Presumably killed in plane crash	Alaska	U.S.	Lindy Boggs	January 3, 1947 (previously served January 3, 1941 – January 3, 1943)	February 15, 1914	Long Beach, Mississippi	92nd (1971–1973)
Frank T. Bow	Republican	Ohio (16th district)	November 13, 1972	71	Heart failure	Bethesda, Maryland	U.S.	Ralph S. Regula	January 3, 1951	February 20, 1901	Canton, Ohio	92nd (1971–1973)
George W. Collins	Democratic	Illinois (6th district)	December 8, 1972	47	Plane crash	Chicago, Illinois	U.S.	Cardiss Collins	November 3, 1970	March 5, 1925	Chicago, Illinois	92nd (1971–1973)
William O. Mills	Republican	Maryland (1st district)	May 24, 1973	48	Suicide by firearm	Bethlehem, Maryland	U.S.	Robert Bauman	May 25, 1971	August 12, 1924	Easton, Maryland	93rd (1973–1975)
John P. Saylor	Republican	Pennsylvania (12th district)	October 28, 1973	65	Heart attack	Houston, Texas	U.S.	John Murtha	September 13, 1949	July 23, 1908	Conemaugh Township, Somerset County, Pennsylvania	93rd (1973–1975)
Charles M. Teague	Republican	California (13th district)	January 1, 1974	64	Heart attack	Santa Paula, California	U.S.	Robert J. Lagomarsino	January 3, 1955	September 18, 1909	Santa Paula, California	93rd (1973–1975)
John C. Kluczynski	Democratic	Illinois (5th district)	January 26, 1975	78	Heart attack	Chicago, Illinois	U.S.	John G. Fary	January 3, 1951	February 15, 1896	Chicago, Illinois	94th (1975–1977)
Jerry Pettis	Republican	California (37th district)	February 14, 1975	58	Plane crash	Banning, California	U.S.	Shirley Neil Pettis	January 3, 1967	July 18, 1916	Phoenix, Arizona	94th (1975–1977)
Wright Patman	Democratic	Texas (1st district)	March 7, 1976	82	Pneumonia	Bethesda, Maryland	U.S.	Sam B. Hall	March 4, 1929	August 6, 1893	Hughes Springs, Texas	94th (1975–1977)
William A. Barrett	Democratic	Pennsylvania (1st district)	April 12, 1976	79	Pneumonia	Philadelphia, Pennsylvania	U.S.	Michael Myers	January 3, 1949 (previously served January 3, 1945 – January 3, 1947)	August 14, 1896	Philadelphia, Pennsylvania	94th (1975–1977)
Torbert Macdonald	Democratic	Massachusetts (7th district)	May 21, 1976	58	Internal hemorrhage	Bethesda, Maryland	U.S.	Edward Markey	January 3, 1955	June 6, 1917	Everett, Massachusetts	94th (1975–1977)
Jerry Litton	Democratic	Missouri (6th district)	August 3, 1976	39	Plane crash	Chillicothe, Missouri	U.S.	Earl Thomas Coleman	January 3, 1973	May 12, 1937	Lock Springs, Missouri	94th (1975–1977)
Philip Hart	Democratic	Michigan (Senator)	December 26, 1976	64	Cancer	Washington, D.C.	U.S.	Donald W. Riegle Jr.	January 3, 1959	December 10, 1912	Bryn Mawr, Pennsylvania	94th (1975–1977)
John L. McClellan	Democratic	Arkansas (Senator)	November 28, 1977	81	Died in sleep following a recent surgery to implant a pacemaker	Little Rock, Arkansas	U.S.	Kaneaster Hodges Jr.	January 3, 1943 (U.S. House tenure January 3, 1935 – January 3, 1939)	February 25, 1896	Sheridan, Arkansas	95th (1977–1979)
Lee Metcalf	Democratic	Montana (Senator)	January 12, 1978	66	Heart attack	Helena, Montana	U.S.	Paul G. Hatfield	January 3, 1961 (U.S. House tenure January 3, 1953 – January 3, 1961)	January 28, 1911	Stevensville, Montana	95th (1977–1979)
Hubert Humphrey	Democratic	Minnesota (Senator)	January 13, 1978	66	Bladder cancer	Waverly, Minnesota	U.S.	Muriel Humphrey	January 3, 1971 (previously served January 3, 1949 – December 30, 1964)	May 27, 1911	Wallace, South Dakota	95th (1977–1979)
James Allen	Democratic	Alabama (Senator)	June 1, 1978	65	Heart attack	Gulf Shores, Alabama	U.S.	Maryon Pittman Allen	January 3, 1969	December 28, 1912	Gadsden, Alabama	95th (1977–1979)
Clifford Allen	Democratic	Tennessee (5th district)	June 18, 1978	66	Heart attack	Nashville, Tennessee	U.S.	Bill Boner	November 25, 1975	January 6, 1912	Jacksonville, Florida	95th (1977–1979)
William M. Ketchum	Republican	California (18th district)	June 24, 1978	56	Heart attack	Bakersfield, California	U.S.	Bill Thomas	January 3, 1973	September 2, 1921	Los Angeles, California	95th (1977–1979)
Ralph Metcalfe	Democratic	Illinois (1st district)	October 10, 1978	68	Heart attack	Chicago, Illinois	U.S.	Bennett M. Stewart	January 3, 1971	May 29, 1910	Atlanta, Georgia	95th (1977–1979)
Goodloe Byron	Democratic	Maryland (6th district)	October 11, 1978	49	Heart attack	Hagerstown, Maryland	U.S.	Beverly Byron	January 3, 1971	June 22, 1929	Williamsport, Maryland	95th (1977–1979)
Leo Ryan	Democratic	California (11th district)	November 18, 1978	53	Murder by gunshot	Port Kaituma, Guyana (Note: Ryan was assassinated by members of the Peoples Temple on orders from cult leader Jim Jones. Later that day, 909 people, including over 250 children, committed mass suicide at Jonestown by drinking cyanide-laced Flavor Aid.)	U.S.	William Royer	January 3, 1973	May 5, 1925	Lincoln, Nebraska	95th (1977–1979)
William A. Steiger	Republican	Wisconsin (6th district)	December 4, 1978	40	Heart attack	Washington, D.C.	U.S.	Thomas E. Petri	January 3, 1967	May 15, 1938	Oshkosh, Wisconsin	95th (1977–1979)

== 1980s ==
Member	Party	State (district)	Date of death	Age at death (years)	Cause	Place of death	Place of burial	Successor	Serving since (in the House/Senate)	Date of birth	Place of birth	U.S. Congress
John M. Slack Jr.	Democratic	West Virginia (3rd district)	March 17, 1980	64	Heart attack	Alexandria, Virginia	Cunningham Memorial Park, St. Albans, West Virginia	John G. Hutchinson	January 3, 1959	March 18, 1915	Charleston, West Virginia	96th (1979–1981)
Harold L. Runnels	Democratic	New Mexico (2nd district)	August 5, 1980	56	Respiratory failure	New York City, New York	Rest Haven Memorial Gardens, Lovington, New Mexico	Joe Skeen	January 3, 1971	March 17, 1924	Dallas, Texas	96th (1979–1981)
Tennyson Guyer	Republican	Ohio (4th district)	April 12, 1981	68	Heart attack	Alexandria, Virginia	Maple Grove Cemetery, Findlay, Ohio	Mike Oxley	January 3, 1973	November 29, 1912	Findlay, Ohio	97th (1981–1983)
William R. Cotter	Democratic	Connecticut (1st district)	September 8, 1981	55	Pancreatic cancer	East Lyme, Connecticut	Mount Saint Benedict Cemetery, Bloomfield, Connecticut	Barbara Kennelly	January 3, 1971	July 18, 1926	Hartford, Connecticut	97th (1981–1983)
John M. Ashbrook	Republican	Ohio (17th district)	April 24, 1982	53	Peptic ulcer	Newark, Ohio	Green Hill Cemetery, Johnstown, Ohio	Jean Spencer Ashbrook	January 3, 1961	September 21, 1928	Johnstown, Ohio	97th (1981–1983)
Adam Benjamin Jr.	Democratic	Indiana (1st district)	September 7, 1982	47	Heart attack	Washington D.C.	Calumet Park Cemetery, Merrillville, Indiana	Katie Hall	January 3, 1977	August 6, 1935	Gary, Indiana	97th (1981–1983)
Benjamin S. Rosenthal	Democratic	New York (7th district)	January 4, 1983	59	Cancer	Washington D.C.	Beth David Cemetery, Elmont, New York	Gary Ackerman	February 20, 1962	June 8, 1923	New York City, New York	98th (1983–1985)
Phillip Burton	Democratic	California (5th district)	April 10, 1983	56	Thrombosis	San Francisco, California	San Francisco National Cemetery, San Francisco, California	Sala Burton	February 18, 1964	June 1, 1926	Cincinnati, Ohio	98th (1983–1985)
Henry M. Jackson	Democratic	Washington (Senator)	September 1, 1983	71	Heart attack	Everett, Washington	Evergreen Cemetery, Everett, Washington	Daniel J. Evans	January 3, 1953 (U.S. House tenure January 3, 1941 – January 3, 1953)	May 31, 1912	Everett, Washington	98th (1983–1985)
Larry McDonald	Democratic	Georgia (7th district)	September 1, 1983	48	Shoot down of Korean Air Lines Flight 007 by Soviet Air Defence Forces interceptors on the orders of General Anatoly Kornukov	Sakhalin, Soviet Union	Crestlawn Cemetery, Augusta, Georgia	George Darden	January 3, 1975	April 1, 1935	Atlanta, Georgia	98th (1983–1985)
Clement J. Zablocki	Democratic	Wisconsin (4th district)	December 3, 1983	71	Heart attack	Milwaukee, Wisconsin	St. Adalbert's Cemetery, Milwaukee, Wisconsin	Jerry Kleczka	January 3, 1949	November 18, 1912	Milwaukee, Wisconsin	98th (1983–1985)
Edwin B. Forsythe	Republican	New Jersey (13th district)	March 29, 1984	68	Lung cancer	Moorestown Township, New Jersey	Medford Friends Meeting Cemetery, Medford, New Jersey	Jim Saxton	November 3, 1970	January 17, 1916	Westtown Township, Pennsylvania	98th (1983–1985)
Carl D. Perkins	Democratic	Kentucky (7th district)	August 3, 1984	71	Heart attack	Lexington, Kentucky	Mountain Memory Gardens, Hindman, Kentucky	Carl C. Perkins	January 3, 1949	October 15, 1912	Hindman, Kentucky	98th (1983–1985)
Gillis W. Long	Democratic	Louisiana (8th district)	January 20, 1985	61	Heart attack	Washington, D.C.	Alexandria National Cemetery, Pineville, Louisiana	Catherine Small Long	January 3, 1973 (previously served January 3, 1963 – January 3, 1965)	May 4, 1923	Winnfield, Winn Parish, Louisiana	99th (1985–1987)
Joseph P. Addabbo	Democratic	New York (6th district)	April 10, 1986	61	Seizure induced coma during treatment for bladder cancer	Washington, D.C.	Saint John's Cemetery, Queens, New York	Alton R. Waldon Jr.	January 3, 1961	March 17, 1925	Queens, New York	99th (1985–1987)
John P. East	Republican	North Carolina (Senator)	June 29, 1986	55	Suicide by carbon monoxide poisoning	Greenville, North Carolina	Arlington National Cemetery, Arlington, Virginia	James T. Broyhill	January 3, 1981	May 5, 1931	Springfield, Illinois	99th (1985–1987)
George M. O'Brien	Republican	Illinois (4th district)	July 17, 1986	69	Prostate cancer	Bethesda, Maryland	Resurrection Cemetery, Romeoville, Illinois	Jack Davis	January 3, 1973	June 17, 1917	Chicago, Illinois	99th (1985–1987)
John E. Grotberg	Republican	Illinois (14th district)	November 15, 1986	61	Bronchial pneumonia and colon cancer	Saint Charles, Illinois	Union Cemetery, Saint Charles, Illinois	Dennis Hastert	January 3, 1985	March 21, 1925	Chicago, Illinois	99th (1985–1987)
Sala Burton	Democratic	California (5th district)	February 1, 1987	61	Colon cancer	Washington, D.C.	Presidio of San Francisco, San Francisco, California	Nancy Pelosi	June 21, 1983	April 1, 1925	Białystok, Poland	100th (1987–1989)
Edward Zorinsky	Democratic	Nebraska (Senator)	March 6, 1987	58	Heart attack	Omaha, Nebraska	Beth El Cemetery, Ralston, Nebraska	David Karnes	December 28, 1976	November 11, 1928	Omaha, Nebraska	100th (1987–1989)
Stewart McKinney	Republican	Connecticut (4th district)	May 7, 1987	56	AIDS-complicated pneumocystis pneumonia	Washington, D.C.	Cremated	Christopher Shays	January 3, 1971	January 30, 1931	Pittsburgh, Pennsylvania	100th (1987–1989)
Dan Daniel	Democratic	Virginia (5th district)	January 23, 1988	73	Heart attack	Charlottesville, Virginia	Highland Burial Park, Danville, Virginia	Lewis F. Payne Jr.	January 3, 1969	May 12, 1914	Chatham, Virginia	100th (1987–1989)
James J. Howard	Democratic	New Jersey (3rd district)	March 25, 1988	60	Heart attack	Washington, D.C.	St. Catharine’s Cemetery, Sea Girt, New Jersey	Frank Pallone	January 3, 1965	July 24, 1927	Irvington, New Jersey	100th (1987–1989)
C. Melvin Price	Democratic	Illinois (21st district)	April 22, 1988	83	Pancreatic cancer	Camp Springs, Maryland	Mount Carmel Cemetery, Belleville, Illinois	Jerry Costello	January 3, 1945	January 1, 1905	East St. Louis, Illinois	100th (1987–1989)
John Duncan Sr.	Republican	Tennessee (2nd district)	June 21, 1988	69	Cancer	Knoxville, Tennessee	Duncan Family Cemetery, Knoxville, Tennessee	Jimmy Duncan	January 3, 1965	March 24, 1919	Knoxville, Tennessee	100th (1987–1989)
William F. Nichols	Democratic	Alabama (3rd district)	December 13, 1988	70	Heart attack	Washington, D.C.	Marble City Cemetery, Sylacauga, Alabama	Glen Browder	January 3, 1967	October 16, 1918	Monroe County, Mississippi	100th (1987–1989)
Claude Pepper	Democratic	Florida (18th district)	May 30, 1989	88	Complications from nutritional deficiencies and malignancy	Washington, D.C.	Oakland Cemetery, Tallahassee, Florida	Ileana Ros-Lehtinen	January 3, 1963 (U.S. Senate tenure November 4, 1936 – January 3, 1951)	September 8, 1900	Dudleyville, Chambers County, Alabama	101st (1989–1991)
Mickey Leland	Democratic	Texas (18th district)	August 7, 1989	44	Plane crash	Gambela, Ethiopia	Golden Gate Cemetery, Houston, Texas	Craig Washington	January 3, 1979	November 27, 1944	Lubbock, Texas	101st (1989–1991)
Larkin I. Smith	Republican	Mississippi (5th district)	August 13, 1989	45	Plane crash	Perry County, Mississippi	Floral Hills Memorial Gardens, Gulfport, Mississippi	Gene Taylor	January 3, 1989	June 26, 1944	Poplarville, Mississippi	101st (1989–1991)

== 1990s ==
Member	Party	State (district)	Date of death	Age at death (years)	Cause	Place of death	Place of burial	Successor	Serving since (in the House/Senate)	Date of birth	Place of birth	U.S. Congress
Spark Matsunaga	Democratic	Hawaii (Senator)	April 15, 1990	73	Prostate cancer	Toronto, Ontario	National Memorial Cemetery of the Pacific, Honolulu, Hawaii	Daniel Akaka	January 3, 1977 (U.S. House tenure January 3, 1963 – January 3, 1977)	October 8, 1916	Kukuiʻula, Hawaii	101st (1989–1991)
Silvio Conte	Republican	Massachusetts (1st district)	February 8, 1991	69	Prostate cancer	Bethesda, Maryland	Saint Josephs Cemetery, Pittsfield, Massachusetts	John Olver	January 3, 1959	November 9, 1921	Pittsfield, Massachusetts	102nd (1991–1993)
John Heinz	Republican	Pennsylvania (Senator)	April 4, 1991	52	Plane crash	Lower Merion Township, Pennsylvania	Homewood Cemetery, Pittsburgh, Pennsylvania	Harris Wofford	January 3, 1977 (U.S. House tenure November 2, 1971 – January 3, 1977)	October 23, 1938	Pittsburgh, Pennsylvania	102nd (1991–1993)
Quentin N. Burdick	Democratic	North Dakota (Senator)	September 8, 1992	84	Heart failure	Fargo, North Dakota	Bohemian Cemetery, Silver Lake, Minnesota	Jocelyn Burdick	August 8, 1960 (U.S. House tenure January 3, 1959 – August 8, 1960)	June 19, 1908	Munich, North Dakota	102nd (1991–1993)
Theodore S. Weiss	Democratic	New York (17th district)	September 14, 1992	64	Heart failure	New York City, New York		Jerrold Nadler	January 3, 1977	September 17, 1927	Gava, Hungary	102nd (1991–1993)
Walter B. Jones Sr.	Democratic	North Carolina (1st district)	September 15, 1992	79	Natural causes	Norfolk, Virginia	Forest Hills Cemetery, Farmville, North Carolina	Eva Clayton	February 5, 1966	August 19, 1913	Fayetteville, North Carolina	102nd (1991–1993)
Paul B. Henry	Republican	Michigan (3rd district)	July 31, 1993	51	Brain cancer	Grand Rapids, Michigan	Woodlawn Cemetery, Grand Rapids, Michigan	Vern Ehlers	January 3, 1985	July 9, 1942	Chicago, Illinois	103rd (1993–1995)
William Natcher	Democratic	Kentucky (2nd district)	March 29, 1994	84	Heart failure	Bethesda, Maryland	Fairview Cemetery, Bowling Green, Kentucky	Ron Lewis	August 1, 1953	September 11, 1909	Bowling Green, Kentucky	103rd (1993–1995)
Dean Gallo	Republican	New Jersey (11th district)	November 6, 1994	58	Prostate cancer	Denville, New Jersey		Rodney Frelinghuysen	January 3, 1985	November 23, 1935	Hackensack, New Jersey	103rd (1993–1995)
Bill Emerson	Republican	Missouri (8th district)	June 22, 1996	58	Lung cancer	Bethesda, Maryland	Hillsboro Cemetery Hillsboro, Missouri	Jo Ann Emerson	January 3, 1981	January 1, 1938	St. Louis, Missouri	104th (1995–1997)
Frank Tejeda	Democratic	Texas (28th district)	January 30, 1997	51	Pneumonia following treatment for brain tumor	San Antonio, Texas	Fort Sam Houston National Cemetery, San Antonio, Texas	Ciro D. Rodriguez	January 3, 1993	October 2, 1945	San Antonio, Texas	105th (1997–1999)
Walter Capps	Democratic	California (22nd district)	October 28, 1997	63	Heart attack	Reston, Virginia	Santa Barbara Cemetery, Santa Barbara, California	Lois Capps	January 3, 1997	May 5, 1934	Omaha, Nebraska	105th (1997–1999)
Sonny Bono	Republican	California (44th district)	January 5, 1998	62	Skiing accident	Stateline, Nevada	Desert Memorial Park, Cathedral City, California	Mary Bono	January 3, 1995	February 16, 1935	Detroit, Michigan	105th (1997–1999)
Steven Schiff	Republican	New Mexico (1st district)	March 25, 1998	51	Squamous-cell skin cancer	Albuquerque, New Mexico	Desert Memorial Park, Cathedral City, California	Heather Wilson	January 3, 1989	March 18, 1947	Chicago, Illinois	105th (1997–1999)
George Brown Jr.	Democratic	California (42nd district)	July 15, 1999	79	Infection following heart valve replacement	Bethesda, Maryland	Cremated	Joe Baca	January 3, 1973 (previously served January 3, 1963 – January 3, 1971)	March 6, 1920	Holtville, California	106th (1999–2001)
John Chafee	Republican	Rhode Island (Senator)	October 24, 1999	77	Congestive heart failure	Washington, D.C.	Chafee Family Cemetery, Warwick, Rhode Island	Lincoln Chafee	December 28, 1976	October 22, 1922	Providence, Rhode Island	106th (1999–2001)

== See also ==
- List of members of the United States Congress who died in office (1790–1899)
- List of members of the United States Congress who died in office (1900–1949)
- List of members of the United States Congress who died in office (2000–present)
