= Steel City FC =

Steel City Football Club is the name of a number of association football teams:

- Ladies Steel City FC, an American women's association football team, and the sister club of Steel City FC (Illinois), based in Joliet, Illinois
- Steel City FC (Illinois), an American men's association football team based in Joliet, Illinois
- Steel City FC (Pennsylvania), an American association football team with both men's and women's teams based in Pittsburgh, Pennsylvania
- Steel City Renegades, a former American women's association football team who were based in Pittsburgh, Pennsylvania
- Steel City Sparks, a former American women's association football team who were based in Pittsburgh, Pennsylvania
- Steel City Wanderers L.F.C., an English women's association football team based in Sheffield, South Yorkshire
