= Russell W. Keeney =

American politician (1897–1958)

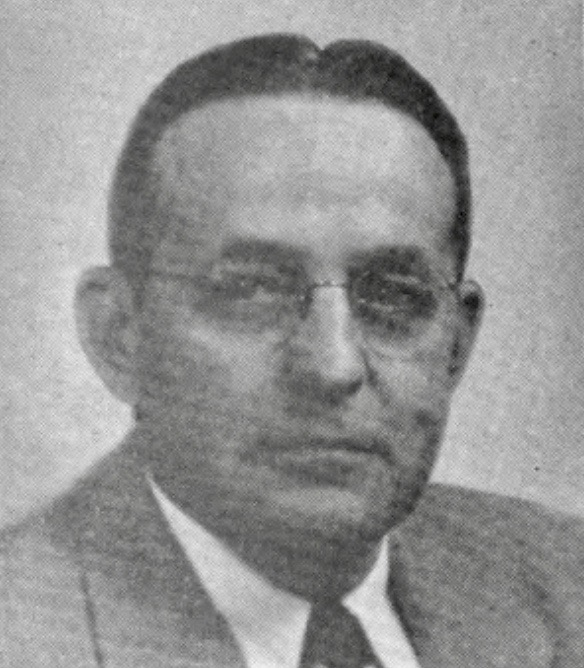

Member of the U.S. House of Representatives from Illinois's 14th district
- In office January 3, 1957 – January 11, 1958
- Preceded by: Chauncey W. Reed
- Succeeded by: Elmer J. Hoffman

Personal details
- Born: Russell Watson Keeney; December 29, 1897 Pittsfield, Illinois, U.S.
- Died: January 11, 1958 (aged 60) Bethesda, Maryland, U.S.
- Resting place: Naperville Protestant Cemetery in Illinois
- Party: Republican
- Spouse(s): Jane Perrier Perkins; Marge LaSchiavo Sansone
- Education: DePaul University (LL.B., LL.M.)

Russell Watson Keeney (December 29, 1897 – January 11, 1958) was an American lawyer and politician who served as a U.S. representative from Illinois. He died just over one year into his first term in office.

== Biography ==
Born in Pittsfield, Illinois, Keeney attended grade and high schools in Naperville, Illinois. He graduated from DePaul University, Chicago, Illinois, in 1919 and in 1921. He was admitted to the bar in 1919 and commenced the practice of law in Naperville, Illinois. In 1920 became Justice of the Peace of Lisle Township and in 1924 town clerk. He served as assistant State's attorney until 1935. State's attorney of Du Page County 1936-1939. County judge of Du Page County 1940-1952. Circuit judge of the sixteenth judicial district of Illinois 1953-1956.

== Congress ==
Keeney was elected as a Republican to the Eighty-fifth Congress and served from January 3, 1957, until his death in Bethesda, Maryland, January 11, 1958.

Keeney voted against the Civil Rights Act of 1957.

== Death ==
He died on January 11, 1958, and was interred in Naperville (Illinois) Protestant Cemetery.

== See also ==
- List of members of the United States Congress who died in office (1950–1999)

U.S. House of Representatives
| Preceded by Chauncey W. Reed | Member of the U.S. House of Representatives from Illinois's 14th congressional district January 3, 1957 - January 11, 1958 | Succeeded by Elmer J. Hoffman |
