= Glassport Odds =

Defunct American football team from Glassport, Pennsylvania

General information
- Founded: 1913
- Folded: 1950
- Headquartered: Glassport, Pennsylvania, United States

Personnel
- Owner: Glassport Odds Club

League / conference affiliations
- Independent

The Glassport Odds were a professional, later semi-professional football team from Glassport, Pennsylvania, from 1913 until 1950.

== History ==
The Odds were organized in 1913 under the leadership of Victor Jaskolski, who coached, and Joseph Pazick, who managed the team. Over half of the players on the team were of Polish descent. One of the most well-known players for the Odds was Samuel Arthur Weiss.

After World War I, from 1919 to 1921, Glassport Odds held a reputation for being one of the fastest teams in independent football. In 1925, the Odds were undefeated during the regular season; however, the team then played the 27th Ward Traders in semi-finals for the independent championship of Western Pennsylvania. The first game ended in a tie, while the second was won by the Traders by a score of 13–3. In the 1920s and 1930s The Odds played against many of the early professional football teams from Pennsylvania, most notable the Art Rooneys Majestics and McKeesport Olympics.

In 1935, the Odds won the semi-professional Allegheny County League.

The Odds had two of their most formidable teams in 1940 and 1941. Prior to these successful seasons, a lack of interest by the people of Glassport and poor equipment almost caused the team to disband. However, an earnest endeavor by coach Steve Zurenda and manager Joe Trunzo, with financial aid by Joe Witkowski, kept the team together. In 1942, the Odds had another successful year, posting a 9–2 record, while battling the Stowe-Rox Cadets to a scoreless tie.

Prior to the 1943 season, the entire squad of 22 players were drafted into the United States military to fight in World War II. Undaunted, the Odds were forced to field one of their youngest teams. However, the team still recorded a successful season by posting a 6–1–1 record. The team's only loss in 1943 was to the Army Engineers of Carnegie Tech, a team that consisted of several former college football stars. In 1944, the Odds joined the Honus Wagner Conference. In 1947, the Odds merged, taking under its wing an infant of one season, the Glassport Semi-Pros.
