= Joseph A. McArdle =

American politician

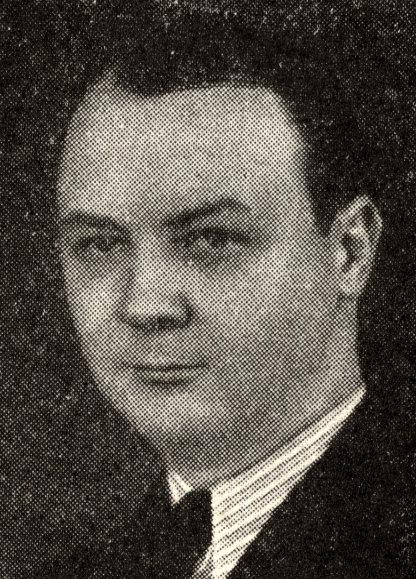

Member of the U.S. House of Representatives from Pennsylvania's 33rd district
- In office January 3, 1939 – January 5, 1942
- Preceded by: Henry Ellenbogen
- Succeeded by: Elmer J. Holland

Personal details
- Born: June 29, 1903 Muncie, Indiana, U.S.
- Died: December 27, 1967 (aged 64) Pittsburgh, Pennsylvania, U.S.
- Party: Democratic (1936–1949); Republican (1949–1967)
- Relatives: Peter J. McArdle (father); Zachary Quinto (grandson)

Joseph A. McArdle (June 29, 1903 – December 27, 1967) was a Democratic member of the U.S. House of Representatives from Pennsylvania.

== Biography ==
McArdle was born in Muncie, Indiana on June 29, 1903. In 1905, he moved to Pittsburgh, Pennsylvania, with his parents, when his father, Peter J. McArdle was elected president of the Amalgamated Association of Iron and Steel Workers. P.J. McArdle would go on to serve as a member of the Pittsburgh City Council from 1911 to 1913, 1916 to 1919, 1922 to 1930, and 1932 to 1940.

Joseph McArdle served in the Pennsylvania State House of Representatives from 1936 to 1938, when he was elected as a Democrat to the Seventy-sixth and Seventy-seventh Congresses and served until his resignation on January 5, 1942, to become a member of the Pittsburgh City Council.

He served as a Pittsburgh City Councilman until 1949. Also in 1949, he switched parties to turn Republican, and became the State GOP committeeman from Mount Washington, Pennsylvania, from early 1950 until 1966.

His grandson is actor Zachary Quinto, and their family story (focusing especially on P.J. McArdle) was featured on the 2022 series finale of the NBC television series Who Do You Think You Are?

== Death and interment ==
McArdle died at the age of sixty-four on December 27, 1967, and was interred at the Roman Catholic Calvary Cemetery, Pittsburgh, Pennsylvania.

== Sources ==
- United States Congress. "Joseph A. McArdle (id: M000297)". Biographical Directory of the United States Congress.
- The Political Graveyard

U.S. House of Representatives
Preceded by Henry Ellenbogen	Member of the U.S. House of Representatives from Pennsylvania's 33rd congressional district 1939–1942	Succeeded by Elmer J. Holland
