= Henry Ellenbogen =

American politician

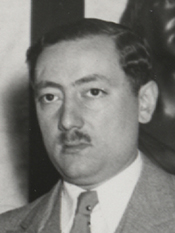

Member of the U.S. House of Representatives from Pennsylvania's 33rd district
- In office March 3, 1933 – January 3, 1938
- Preceded by: Melville Clyde Kelly
- Succeeded by: Joseph A. McArdle

Personal details
- Born: April 3, 1900 Vienna, Austria-Hungary
- Died: July 4, 1985 (aged 85) Miami, Florida, U.S.
- Party: Democratic
- Spouse: Rachel "Rae" Savage (died 1981)
- Children: 2
- Parents: Samson Ellenbogen (father); Rose Franzos (mother)
- Education: University of Vienna; Duquesne University (AB, JD)
- Occupation: Lawyer; judge; politician

Henry Ellenbogen (April 3, 1900 – July 4, 1985) was an American lawyer and politician who served as a Democratic member of the U.S. House of Representatives from Pennsylvania, serving from 1933 to 1938.

== Biography ==
Ellenbogen was the son of Samson and Rose (née Franzos) Ellenbogen. He was born into a Jewish family in Vienna, then in Austria-Hungary, and attended the University of Vienna Law School. He immigrated to the United States and settled in Pittsburgh, Pennsylvania. He attended Duquesne University in Pittsburgh, and received his A.B. in 1921 and J.D. in 1924. He was appointed as arbitrator and public panel chairman by the National War Labor Board and the Third Regional War Labor Board in cases involving labor disputes. He wrote numerous articles on economic, social, and legal problems.

He married Rachel "Rae" Savage, and they had two daughters, author Naomi Feigelson Chase and Judith Specter. Mrs. Ellenbogen died in 1981.

=== Political career ===
Ellenbogen was first elected as a Democrat to the Seventy-third Congress. It was unclear at the time whether he was eligible to be a Representative, having only been a citizen of the United States for six years instead of the seven required by the Constitution of the United States. However, he was seated and voted in the second session of the Seventy-third Congress in January 1934. With Senator Robert Wagner, his sponsorship of the Wagner-Ellenbogen Housing Bill was a significant step in housing policy. Also working with Wagner, he worked to help a great number of Jews escape fascism in Europe in the 1930s.

He was re-elected to the Seventy-fourth, and Seventy-fifth Congresses and served until his resignation in 1938, having been elected judge of the common pleas court of Allegheny County, Pennsylvania. He was reelected as a judge in November 1947 and again in 1957 and served as presiding judge, 1963 to 1966.

=== Retirement and death ===
He retired and was a resident of Miami, Florida, until his death there. He is buried in West View Cemetery of the Rodef Shalom Congregation in Squirrel Hill, Pittsburgh.

== See also ==
- List of Jewish members of the United States Congress

== References and sources ==
- United States Congress. "Henry Ellenbogen (id: E000111)". Biographical Directory of the United States Congress.
- The Political Graveyard

U.S. House of Representatives
Preceded by M. Clyde Kelly	Member of the U.S. House of Representatives from Pennsylvania's 33rd congressional district 1933–1938	Succeeded by Joseph A. McArdle
