= Zachary Quinto =

American actor (born 1977)

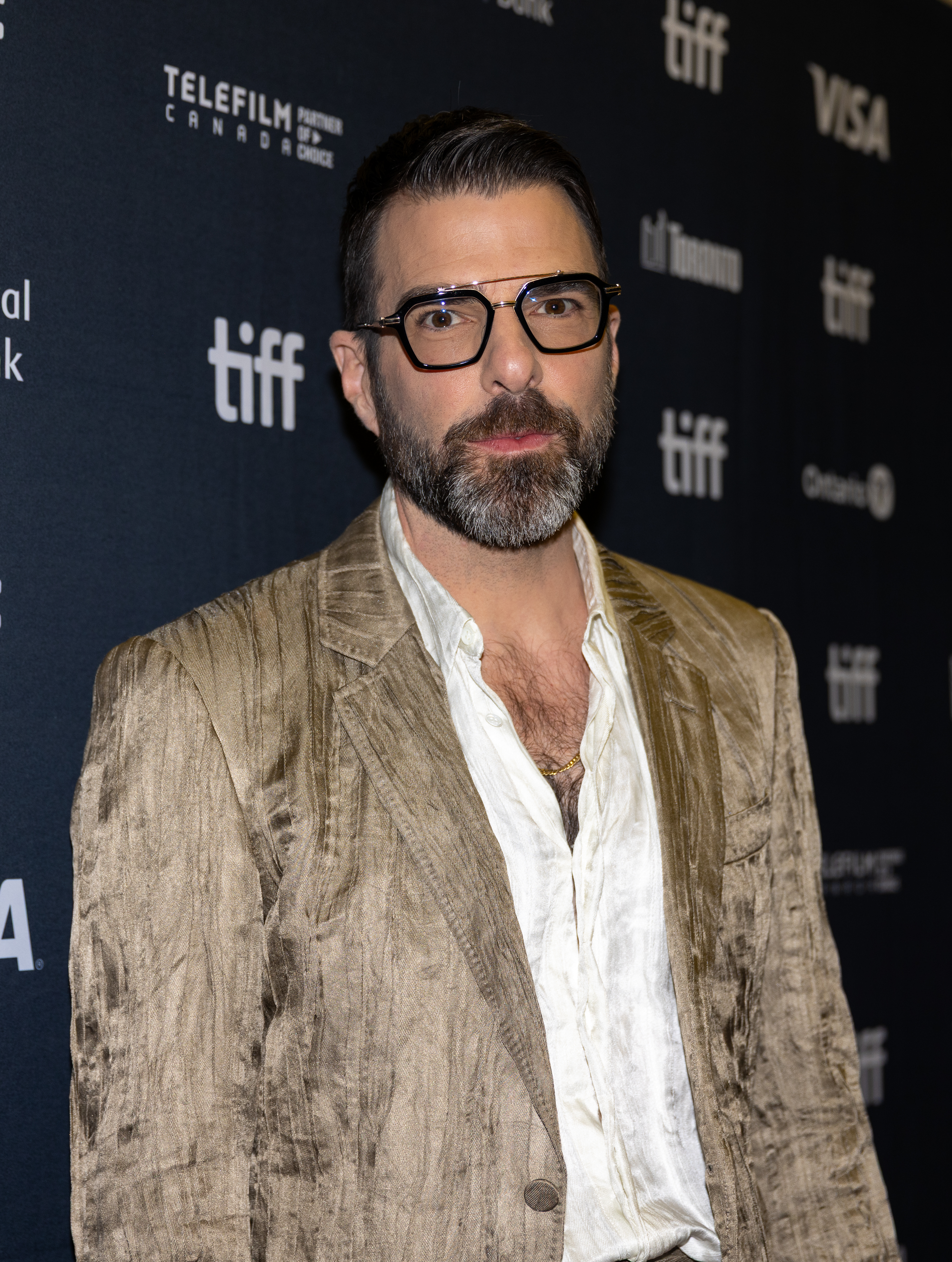
- Quinto in 2025
- Born: Zachary John Quinto; June 2, 1977 (age 49); Pittsburgh, Pennsylvania, U.S.
- Education: Carnegie Mellon University (BFA)
- Occupations: Actor; producer
- Years active: 2000–present
- Relatives: Peter J. McArdle (great-grandfather); Joseph A. McArdle (grandfather)

Zachary John Quinto (/ˈkwɪntoʊ/; born June 2, 1977) is an American actor. He is known for his roles as Sylar, the primary antagonist from the science fiction drama series Heroes (2006–2010); Spock in the film Star Trek (2009) and its sequels Star Trek Into Darkness (2013) and Star Trek Beyond (2016); Charlie Manx in the AMC series NOS4A2, and Dr. Oliver Thredson in American Horror Story: Asylum, for which he received a nomination for a Primetime Emmy Award.

He starred in and produced Brilliant Minds from 2024 until 2026, a medical drama on NBC. His other starring film roles include Margin Call (2011), Hitman: Agent 47 (2015), Snowden (2016), and Hotel Artemis (2018). He also appeared in smaller roles on television series, such as So Notorious, The Slap, and 24, and on stage in Angels in America, The Glass Menagerie, and Smokefall.

== Early life and education ==
Zachary John Quinto was born in Pittsburgh, Pennsylvania, to Margaret "Margo" (née McArdle), who worked at an investment firm and later at a magistrate's office, and Joseph John "Joe" Quinto, a barber. He was raised in the suburb of Green Tree, Pennsylvania, and attended Saints Simon and Jude Catholic School (closed 2010). His father died of cancer when Quinto was seven years old, and Quinto and his brother, Joe, were subsequently raised by their mother. Quinto's maternal great-grandfather was the labor activist and Republican Pittsburgh City Councilman Peter J. McArdle, whom Pittsburgh's P.J. McArdle Roadway is named after. His maternal grandfather was Joseph A. McArdle, a Democratic member of the U.S. House of Representatives.

Quinto was raised Catholic. His father was of Italian descent, while his mother was of Irish ancestry. Quinto graduated from Central Catholic High School in 1995, where he participated in its musicals and won the Gene Kelly Award for Best Supporting Actor, and then attended Carnegie Mellon University's School of Drama, from which he graduated in 1999.

== Career ==
Quinto first appeared on television in the short-lived television series The Others, and appeared as a guest star on shows including CSI: Crime Scene Investigation, Touched by an Angel, Charmed, Six Feet Under, Lizzie McGuire, and Dragnet. In 2003, during the theatrical run of Endgame by Samuel Beckett, directed by Kristina Lloyd at the Odyssey Theatre in Los Angeles playing the role of Clov, he landed a recurring role as computer expert Adam Kaufman on the Fox series 24; Quinto appeared in 23 episodes of the third season.

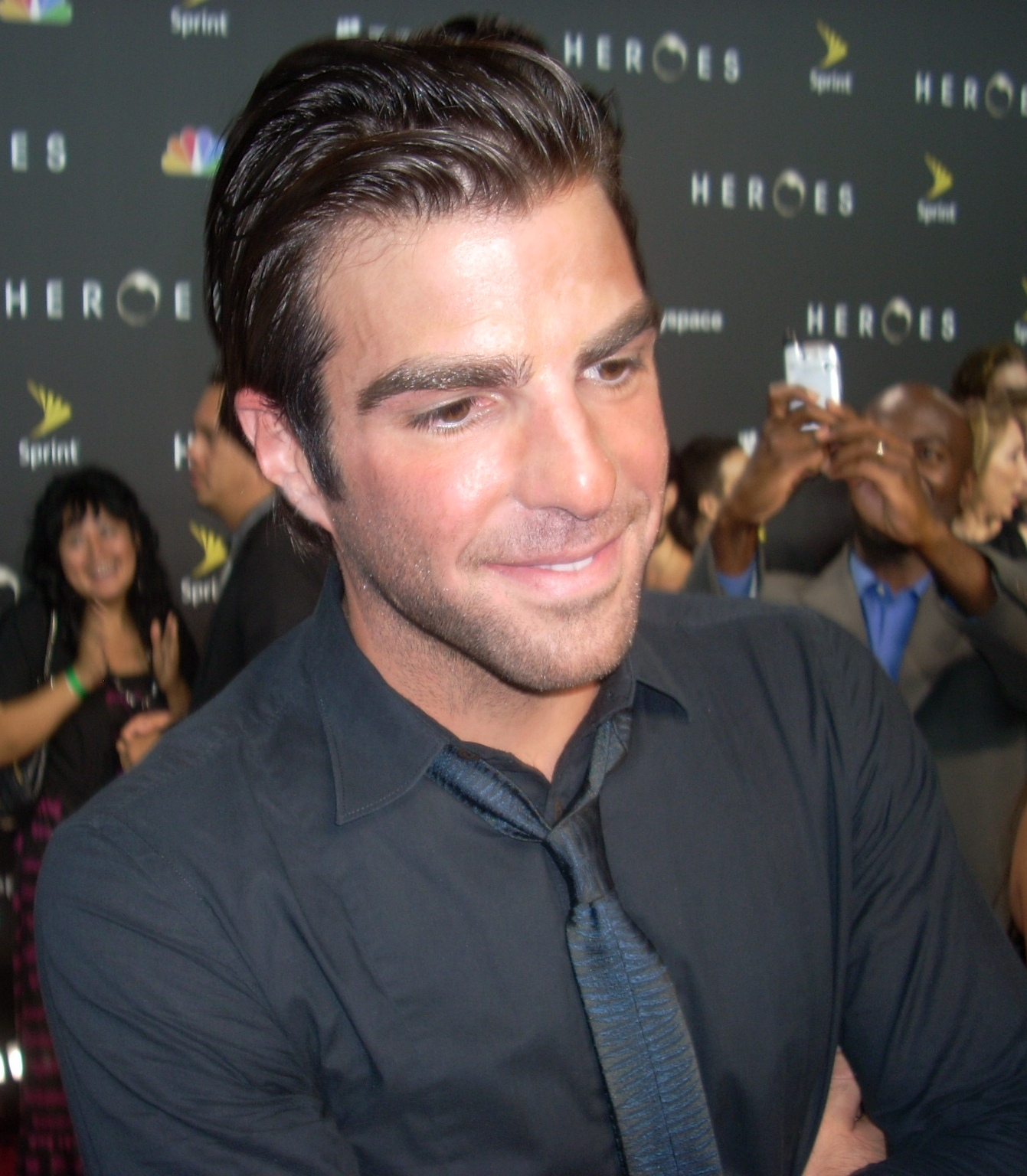
Quinto at the premiere party of Heroes' third season in 2008

In 2006, Quinto played the role of Sasan, the haughty, bisexual Iranian-American best friend of Tori Spelling on her VH1 series So Notorious. Later that year, he joined the cast of Heroes as Gabriel Gray, better known as the serial killer Sylar. He worked on the series until its cancellation in 2010 after four seasons.

His casting as a young Spock in the J. J. Abrams–directed reboot of the Star Trek film franchise was officially announced at the 2007 Comic-Con. Speaking alongside Leonard Nimoy at a press conference to promote the first new Star Trek film, Quinto revealed that Nimoy had been given casting approval over who would play the role of the young Spock. "For me Leonard's involvement was only liberating, frankly," says Quinto. "I knew that he had approval over the actor that would play young Spock, so when I got the role I knew from the beginning it was with his blessing."

In a September 2008 interview, Abrams said of Quinto's performance as Spock: "Zachary brought a gravity and an incredible sense of humor, which is a wonderful combination because Spock's character is deceivingly complicated. The revelation for me watching the movie, when I finally got to watch the whole thing after working on sequences, was that he is extraordinary. He was doing things I didn't even realize while we were shooting – these amazing things to track his story." After Star Trek, he appeared in the comedy short Boutonniere (2009). It "...was a movie written and directed by my former landlady and friend, [actress Coley Sohn]. She called up and said, 'Would you do me a favor and be in my short film?'"

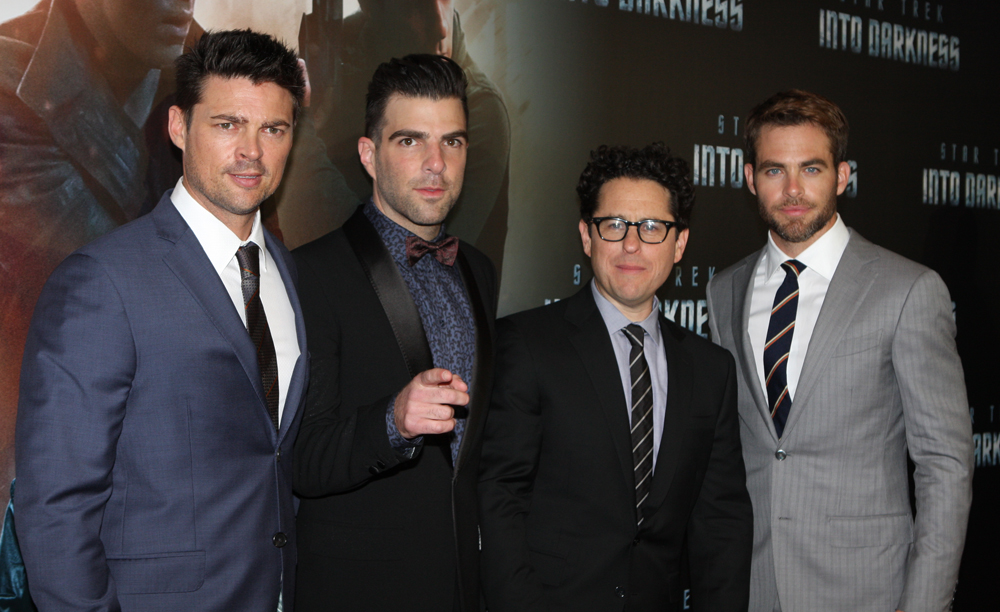
Karl Urban, Quinto, J. J. Abrams, and Chris Pine at the Star Trek Into Darkness Australian movie premiere in Sydney, April 2013

In 2008, Quinto joined with Corey Moosa and Neal Dodson to form Before the Door Pictures. The company produced projects in film, television, new media, and published two graphic novels in a deal with comic book publisher Archaia Entertainment: they published a graphic novel called Mr. Murder is Dead, created by writer Victor Quinaz, closely followed by LUCID: A Matthew Dee Adventure written by writer/actor Michael McMillian.

Quinto also starred in several comedy shorts. He played a strangely lovable kidnapper in "Hostage: A Love Story", written by the comedy duo HoltandSteele for Before the Door Pictures and Funny or Die. He also played a prospective dog adopter (based on Quinto's own experience) in "Dog Eat Dog", written and directed by Sian Heder, and premiered at the LA Film Festival in 2012.

Quinto has also kept up his theatre experience, which includes roles in a variety of productions, including classics such as Beckett's Endgame, William Shakespeare's Much Ado About Nothing at the Los Angeles Shakespeare Festival, and Intelligent Design of Jenny Chow at the Old Globe Theatre. From October 2010 to February 2011, Quinto played the lead role of Louis Ironson in an Off-Broadway revival of Tony Kushner's Angels in America at the Signature Theatre Company, New York City. For this role, Quinto received the Theatre World Award.

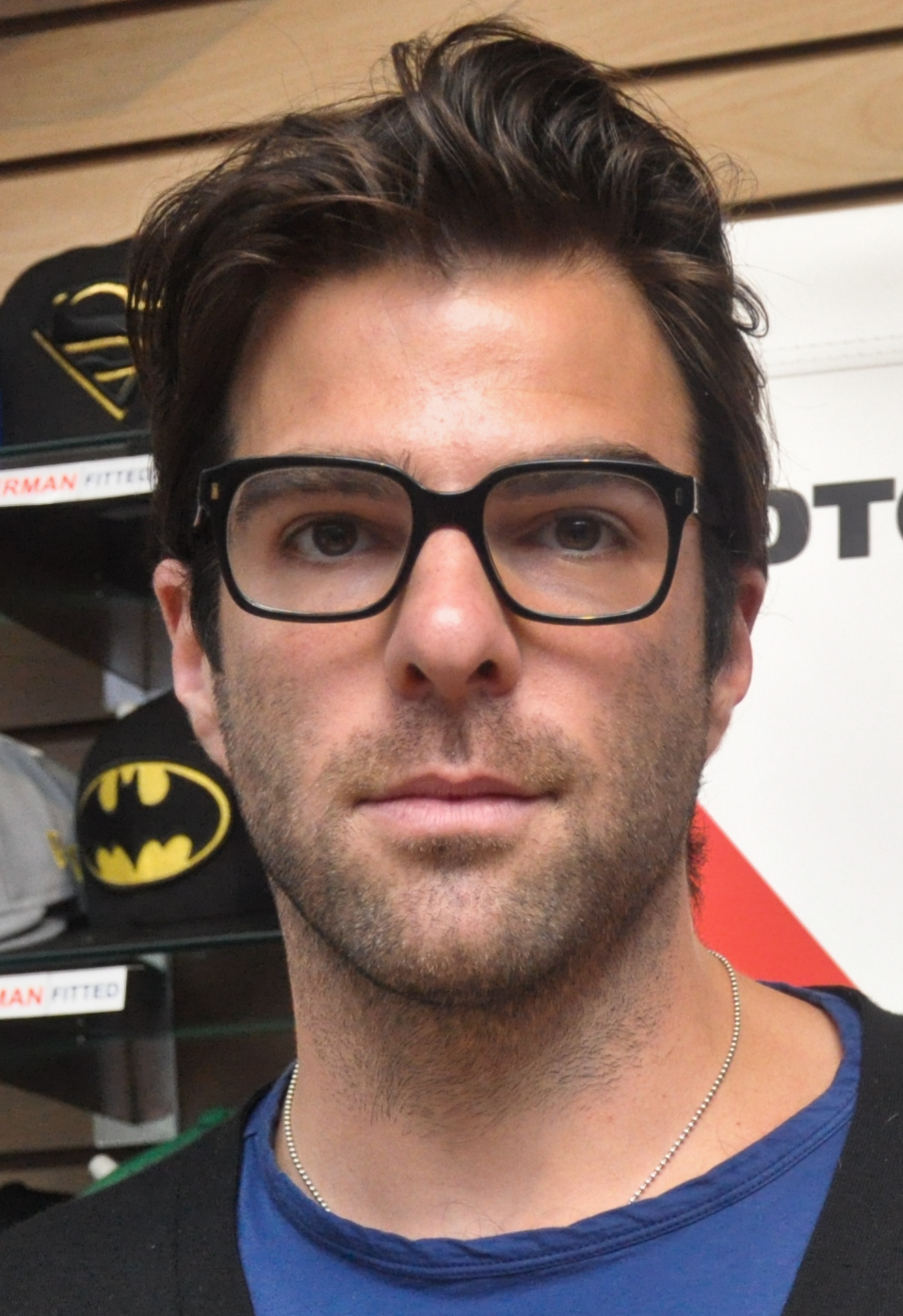
Quinto at a Midtown Comics signing in 2011

In 2010, Quinto's company Before the Door Pictures produced Margin Call, an independent film about the 2008 financial crisis. Quinto played the role of Peter Sullivan in the film, in a cast that included Jeremy Irons, Kevin Spacey, Paul Bettany, Stanley Tucci, Penn Badgley, and Demi Moore. Margin Call premiered in January 2011 at the 2011 Sundance Film Festival. The film received an Oscar nomination for Best Original Screenplay by J. C. Chandor. Quinto was also an executive producer for Chandor's next film All Is Lost (2013) with Robert Redford as the sole actor.

In October 2011, Quinto began a recurring role on the FX series American Horror Story as Chad, former owner of the house. Quinto returned for the second season in one of the lead roles, as Dr. Oliver Thredson. In 2013, Quinto played the role of Tom Wingfield in the American Repertory Theater's production of The Glass Menagerie by Tennessee Williams. He was also in the Broadway reprisal of the production, in 2014. In 2014, Quinto and his Before the Door partners produced a Chris Moore project, The Chair, a documentary series on Starz that shows the process of two directors bringing their first feature to the screen. In 2015, Quinto was a guest on the acclaimed TV series Girls and Hannibal. In February 2016, he appeared in the New York premiere of MCC Theater's Smokefall.

Movie-wise, Quinto reprised his role of Spock in Star Trek Into Darkness and Star Trek Beyond, released in 2013 and 2016. In addition, he played John Smith in Hitman: Agent 47 (2015). At the other end of the spectrum from the action-oriented Agent 47, Quinto appeared opposite James Franco in the drama I Am Michael (2015), a film that premiered at the 2015 Sundance Film Festival. In 2016, he portrayed journalist Glenn Greenwald in the Edward Snowden biopic Snowden, narrated, as space scientist Pascal Lee, in the documentary film Passage to Mars, and appeared as himself in the documentary film For the Love of Spock.

In 2016, science fiction author John Scalzi released a novella, The Dispatcher, created specifically for Audible; Quinto narrated the story, as well as the second book in the series, Murder by Other Means. He also starred with Michelle Buteau in the Audible scripted podcast, Sorry Charlie Miller.

In 2018, Quinto starred in the Broadway play The Boys in the Band. In 2022, Quinto made his debut on the West End stage in London as Gore Vidal in James Graham's new play Best of Enemies. The play revolves around the adversarial televised debates between the gay, liberal writer Vidal and the conservative polemicist William F. Buckley Jr. (played by British actor David Harewood) during the 1968 US Democratic and Republican National Conventions. The production, directed by Jeremy Herrin first at the Young Vic then at the Noël Coward Theatre, was a commercial and critical hit.

Quinto has modeled for magazines including GQ and August.

== Personal life ==
Quinto publicly came out as gay in October 2011. He explained that, after the suicide of bisexual teenager Jamey Rodemeyer, he felt that "living a gay life without publicly acknowledging it is simply not enough to make any significant contribution to the immense work that lies ahead on the road to complete equality." Prior to his coming out, Quinto had long been an active supporter of gay rights and organizations, including The Trevor Project. In 2009, he appeared in the one-night production Standing on Ceremony: The Gay Marriage Plays, a benefit stage reading in response to the passing of Proposition 8, as well as in the play The Laramie Project: 10 Years Later, about the 1998 murder of Matthew Shepard. In 2010, Quinto contributed a video to the It Gets Better Project, an Internet-based campaign that aims to prevent suicide among LGBTQAI+ youth. In 2012, Quinto campaigned on behalf of Barack Obama, including appearing in the video Obama Pride: LGBT Americans For Obama.

From 2010 to 2013, Quinto was in a relationship with actor Jonathan Groff. Quinto began dating model and musician Miles McMillan in the summer of 2013. In early 2015, the couple moved into a NoHo apartment they purchased together. In November 2015, Vogue called them "a power couple whose domain extends across the film, fashion, and art scene." The two ended their relationship in early 2019.

In 2017, Quinto criticized the timing of actor Kevin Spacey's decision to coming out as part of his response to allegations of sexual advances towards then-14-year-old actor Anthony Rapp. He called the manner of Spacey's announcement "deeply sad and troubling", feeling he had not stood up "as a point of pride—in the light of all his many awards and accomplishments—thus inspiring tens of thousands of struggling LGBTQ kids around the world", but instead as "a calculated manipulation to deflect attention from the very serious accusation that he attempted to molest one".

== Filmography ==
=== Film ===
Year	Title	Role	Notes	Ref.
2009	Star Trek	Spock		
2011	Margin Call	Peter Sullivan	Also producer	
2011	Girl Walks into a Bar	Nicolas "Nick"		
2011	What's Your Number?	Rick		
2013	Star Trek Into Darkness	Spock		
2013	All Is Lost	—N/a	Executive producer	
2014	We'll Never Have Paris	Jameson		
2015	I Am Michael	Bennett		
2015	Hitman: Agent 47	John Smith		
2016	Tallulah	Andreas		
2016	Star Trek Beyond	Spock		
2016	Snowden	Glenn Greenwald		
2016	Passage to Mars	Pascal Lee	Voice	
2017	Aardvark	Josh Norman	Also producer	
2017	Who We Are Now	Peter		
2018	Hotel Artemis	Crosby		
2019	High Flying Bird	David Starr		
2020	Superman: Man of Tomorrow	Lex Luthor	Voice	
2020	The Boys in the Band	Harold		
2021	The Shuroo Process	—N/a	Executive producer	
2023	Down Low	Gary		
2023	He Went That Way	Jim		
2023	Yes I Am - The Ric Weiland Story	Ric Weiland	Voice	
2024	Justice League: Crisis on Infinite Earths – Part One	Lex Luthor	Voice	
2024	Adult Best Friends	Henry	Also executive producer	
2024	Long Distance	L.E.O.N.A.R.D.	Voice	

=== Television ===
Year	Title	Role	Notes	Ref.
2000	The Others	Tony	Episode: "Unnamed"	
2001	Touched by an Angel	Mike	Episode: "When Sunny Gets Blue"	
2002	CSI: Crime Scene Investigation	Mitchell Sullivan	Episode: "Anatomy of a Lye"	
2002	Off Centre	Smudge	Episode: "Diddler on the Roof"	
2002	Lizzie McGuire	Director	Episode: "Party Over Here"	
2002	Haunted	Paul Kingsley	Episode: "Grievous Angels"	
2002	The Agency	Jay Lambert	Episode: "Air Lex"	
2003	Six Feet Under	Hip Student	Episode: "The Eye Inside"	
2003	Charmed	Warlock	Episode: "Cat House"	
2003	Miracles	Messenger	Episode: "Battle at Shadow Ridge"	
2003–2004	24	Adam Kaufman	23 episodes	
2004	Dragnet	Howard Simms	Episode: "Frame of Mind"	
2004	Hawaii	Loomis	Episode: "No Man Is an Island"	
2004	Joan of Arcadia	Pretentious Filmmaker God	Episode: "P.O.V."	
2005	Blind Justice	Scott Collins	Episode: "In Your Face"	
2006	Crossing Jordan	Leo Fulton Jr.	Episode: "Code of Ethics"	
2006	Twins	Jason	Episode: "When I Move, You Move"	
2006	So Notorious	Sasan	10 episodes	
2006–2010	Heroes	Sylar	60 episodes	
2008	Robot Chicken	Archimedes Q. Porter / Sylar	Voice; episode: "Bionic Cow"	
2011	American Horror Story: Murder House	Chad Warwick	4 episodes	
2012–2013	American Horror Story: Asylum	Dr. Oliver Thredson	12 episodes	
2014	The Chair	Himself	10 episodes; also producer	
2015	The Slap	Harry Apostolou	7 episodes	
2015	Girls	Ace	2 episodes	
2015	Hannibal	Neal Frank	2 episodes	
2016	Lip Sync Battle	Himself	Episode: "Zoe Saldana vs. Zachary Quinto"	
2018	In Search of...	Himself	10 episodes	
2019	Unbreakable Kimmy Schmidt	Eli Rubin	2 episodes	
2019	Nova	Narrator	Voice; 5 episodes	
2019–2020	NOS4A2	Charlie Manx	20 episodes	
2019–2021	Big Mouth	Aiden	Voice; 11 episodes	
2020	Little America	Teacher	Episode: "The Silence"	
2021	Who Wants to Be a Millionaire	Himself	Episode: "In the Hot Seat: Amanda Peet, Zachary Quinto & Karamo Brown"	
2021	Inside Job	Doctor SkullFinger	Voice; episode: "Ghost Protocol"	
2021–2025	Invincible	Robot / Rudolph "Rudy" Conners	Voice; 16 episodes	
2022	Who Do You Think You Are?	Himself	Episode: "Zachary Quinto"	
2022	American Horror Story: NYC	Sam Jones	7 episodes	
2022–2025	The Proud Family: Louder and Prouder	Barry Leibowitz-Jenkins	Voice; 7 episodes	
2023	American Horror Story: Delicate	Himself	Episode: "Rockabye"; uncredited	
2024–2026	Brilliant Minds	Dr. Oliver Wolf	Main role; also producer	
2025	The Artist	Delphin Delmas		

=== Stage ===
Year	Title	Role	Notes	Ref.
2010	Angels in America	Louis Ironson	Signature Theatre Company; Off-Broadway	
2013	The Glass Menagerie	Tom Wingfield	American Repertory Theater; Boston, MA	
2013	The Glass Menagerie	Tom Wingfield	Booth Theatre; Broadway	
2016	Smokefall	Footnote / Fetus Two / Samuel	MCC Theater	
2018	The Boys in The Band	Harold	Booth Theatre; Broadway	
2022	Who's Afraid of Virginia Woolf?	George	Geffen Playhouse; Los Angeles, CA	
2022	Best of Enemies	Gore Vidal	Young Vic; West End	
2022	Best of Enemies	Gore Vidal	Noël Coward Theatre; West End	
2024	Cult of Love	Mark Dahl	Hayes Theatre; Broadway	

=== Video games ===
Year	Title	Voice role	Ref.
2000	Code Blue	Monty Rodriguez	
2006	24: The Game	Adam Kaufman	
2010	Star Trek Online	Khitomer Emergency Medical Hologram	
2013	Star Trek	Spock	

== Awards and nominations ==
Year	Award	Work	Result	Ref.
2007	TV Land Award for Future Classic Award	Heroes	Won	
2007	Teen Choice Award for Choice TV Villain	Heroes	Nominated	
2008	Teen Choice Award for Choice TV Villain	Heroes	Nominated	
2009	Teen Choice Award for Choice TV Villain	Heroes	Nominated	
2009	Teen Choice Award for Best Rumble (shared with Chris Pine)	Star Trek	Nominated	
2009	Critics' Choice Award for Best Cast	Star Trek	Nominated	
2009	Boston Society of Film Critics Award for Best Cast	Star Trek	Won	
2009	Washington D.C. Area Film Critics Association for Best Ensemble	Star Trek	Nominated	
2010	People's Choice Award for Favorite Breakout Movie Actor	Star Trek	Nominated	
2010	SFX Award for Best Actor	Heroes, Star Trek	Won	
2011	Drama Desk Award for Outstanding Featured Actor in a Play	Angels in America	Nominated	
2011	Theatre World Award	Angels in America	Won	
2011	Tina Award for Best Actor (Play)	Angels in America	Won	
2011	Tina Award for Best Ensemble (Play)	Angels in America	Won	
2011	Tina Award for Best Stage Duo (shared with Christian Borle)	Angels in America	Won	
2011	Gotham Independent Film Award for Best Ensemble Performance	Margin Call	Nominated	
2011	Phoenix Film Critics Society Award for Best Ensemble Acting	Margin Call	Nominated	
2012	Central Ohio Film Critics Association Award for Best Ensemble	Margin Call	Nominated	
2012	AACTA International Award for Best Film (as producer)	Margin Call	Nominated	
2012	Independent Spirit Award for Best First Feature (as producer)	Margin Call	Won	
2012	Robert Altman Award	Margin Call	Won	
2012	Saturn Award for Best Guest Starring Role on Television	American Horror Story	Nominated	
2013	Critics' Choice Television Award for Best Supporting Actor in a Movie/Miniseries	American Horror Story: Asylum	Won	
2013	Primetime Emmy Award for Outstanding Supporting Actor in a Miniseries or a Movie	American Horror Story: Asylum	Nominated	
2013	PAAFTJ Television Award for Best Supporting Actor in a Miniseries or TV Movie	American Horror Story: Asylum	—N/a	
2013	PAAFTJ Television Award for Best Cast in a Miniseries or TV Movie	American Horror Story: Asylum	—N/a	
2013	People's Choice Award Favorite Movie Duo (shared with Chris Pine)	Star Trek Into Darkness	Nominated	
2013	Elliot Norton Award for Outstanding Ensemble	The Glass Menagerie	Won	
2014	Drama League Award for Distinguished Performance	The Glass Menagerie	Nominated	
2014	Broadway.com Audience Choice Award for Favorite Leading Actor in a Play	The Glass Menagerie	Nominated	
2014	BroadwayWorld.com Award for Best Leading Actor in a Play	The Glass Menagerie	Nominated	
2017	Saturn Award for Best Supporting Actor in a Film	Star Trek Beyond	Nominated	

== See also ==
- Sundance Film Festival
- LGBT culture in New York City
- List of LGBT people from New York City
- List of Carnegie Mellon University people
- NYC Pride March
