= Vera Buchanan =

American politician (1902–1955)

Vera Daerr Buchanan
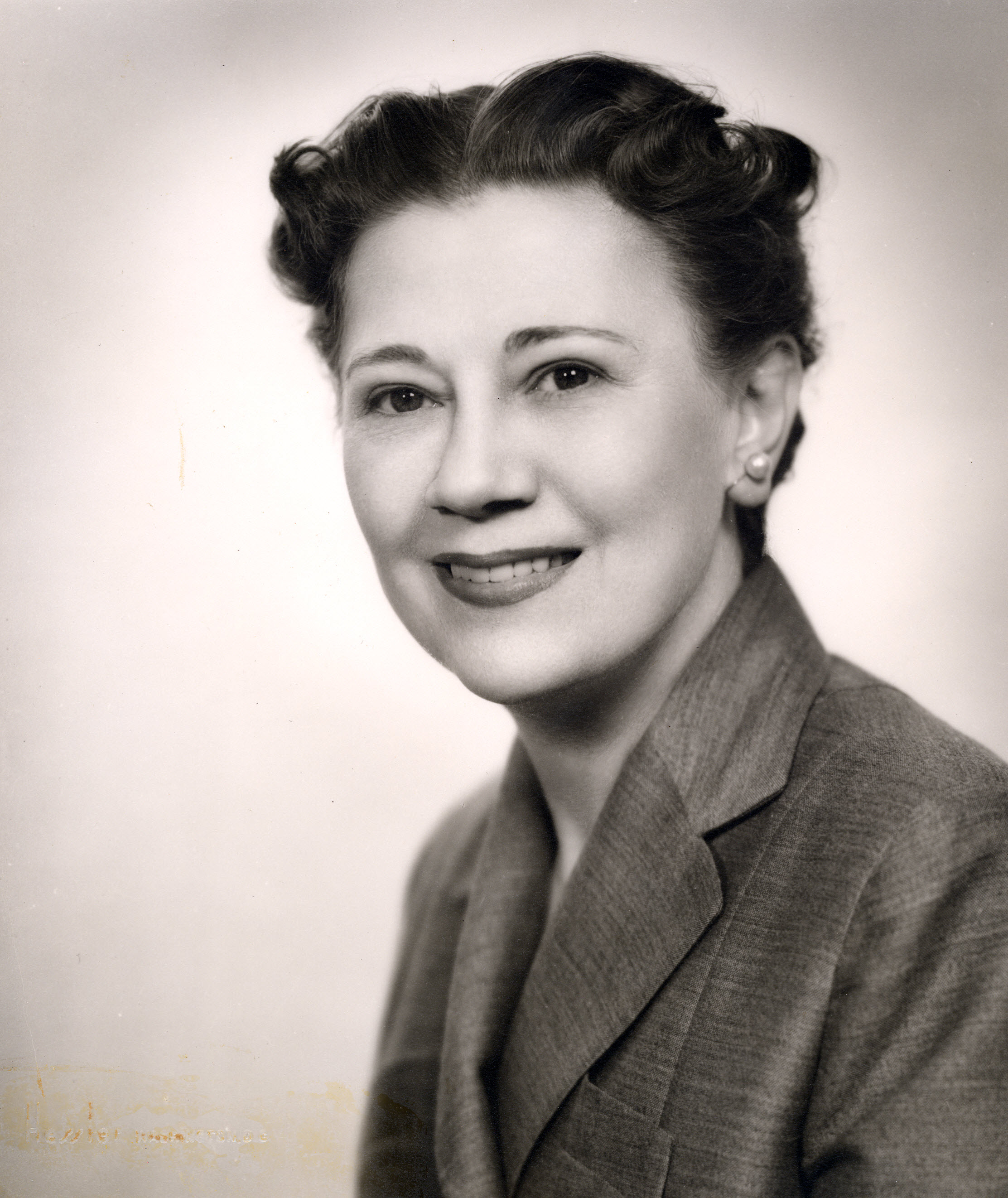

Member of the U.S. House of Representatives from Pennsylvania
- In office July 24, 1951 – November 26, 1955
- Preceded by: Frank Buchanan
- Succeeded by: Elmer J. Holland
- Constituency: 33rd district (1951–53); 30th district (1953–55)

Personal details
- Born: Vera Daerr; July 20, 1902 Wilson, Pennsylvania, U.S.
- Died: November 26, 1955 (aged 53) McKeesport, Pennsylvania, U.S.
- Resting place: Mount Vernon Cemetery in Elizabeth, Pennsylvania
- Party: Democratic
- Spouse: Frank Buchanan

Vera Daerr Buchanan (July 20, 1902 – November 26, 1955) was a Democratic member of the U.S. House of Representatives from Pennsylvania from 1951 to 1955.

She was the first female member of the U.S. Congress to die while holding office, and she and her husband, who had also died in office, were the first congressional wife and husband to both die while still in office.

== Early life and educational ==
Born in Wilson, Pennsylvania (later incorporated into Clairton) on July 20, 1902, Vera Daerr was a daughter of John Daerr and Jennie Leasure Daerr. A student of the public and parochial schools in Duquesne, Pennsylvania during her formative years, she graduated from high school there, and went on to secure employment as a secretary for that community's steel mill. After marrying automobile dealer and teacher Frank Buchanan in 1929, she and her husband raised twin daughters.

In 1942, she helped her husband win the mayoral election in McKeesport, Pennsylvania. According to historians at the U.S. House of Representatives, as McKeesport's first lady, Vera Daerr Buchanan then initiated "a listening campaign to familiarize herself with the needs of constituents and began cultivating a support base for future election campaigns." Four years later, her husband won the May 1946 special election, filling a vacancy left in the 79th Congress (1945–1947) created by Representative Samuel A. Weiss’s resignation.

== Tenure ==
Serving as her husband's secretary during his five-year tenure, she was then won the special election to fill his seat after her husband died suddenly on April 27, 1951. Running as a Democrat and garnering roughly 62 percent of the vote to defeat Clifford W. Flegal in the July 24, 1951 special election, Buchanan won and was subsequently sworn in to the 82nd United States Congress on August 1 by Sam Rayburn, Speaker of the U.S. House of Representatives. Reelected to the 83rd and 84th United States Congresses, she served until her death in McKeesport at the age of 53.

During her tenure, she served on the House Banking and Currency, Merchant Marine and Fisheries, and Public Works committees, but resigned from the Merchant Marine Committee in 1952 in order to devote more energy to the other two committee roles. She was supported in her efforts by her daughter Jane Buchanan, who served as her secretary.

Safe, affordable housing and affordable groceries for working people became two of her priorities, as did flood protection initiatives for her district. During one speech on the floor of the U.S. House, she pressed her colleagues to understand that American families "should have a chance to live in decent housing," adding that safe, stable housing "is one of the most important factors in a child's environment."

== Illness ==
During her third and final term in Congress, Buchanan was diagnosed with terminal cancer. Initially committed to working from her hospital bed at the Bethesda Naval Hospital when she received the diagnosis in June 1955, she continued to do so until she was forced by her failing health to move closer to home. Hospitalized for the final three months of her life at the McKeesport Hospital, she continued working for much of that time until she finally died on November 26, 1955.

=== Death and burial ===
The first female member of Congress ever to die while still serving, she was buried at the Mount Vernon Cemetery in Elizabeth, Pennsylvania.

== See also ==
- List of members of the United States Congress who died in office (1950–1999)
- Women in the United States House of Representatives

== Sources ==
- United States Congress. "Vera Buchanan (id: B001009)". Biographical Directory of the United States Congress.
- The Political Graveyard

U.S. House of Representatives
Preceded by Frank Buchanan	Member of the U.S. House of Representatives from Pennsylvania's 33rd congressional district 1951–1953	Succeeded by District Eliminated
Preceded by Robert J. Corbett	Member of the U.S. House of Representatives from Pennsylvania's 30th congressional district 1953–1955	Succeeded by Elmer J. Holland
