= Theodore Schaffer =

Theodore J. Schaffer (born April 25, 1857) was president of the Amalgamated Association of Iron, Steel, and Tin Workers, republican, Methodist. He was born in Pittsburgh, Pennsylvania in 1856, raised there, and educated in the public schools. His father, Mathias F. Shaffer, is a native of Karlsruhe, Germany, and came to the States as a young man, in 1847.

Theodore Schaffer began selling papers when he was eight years old, and left school at the age of twelve, but afterwards, when nineteen years old, resumed his studies, and later attended the Western University, now University of Pittsburgh. When fourteen years old he began work in the iron mill of Moorhead, McLean & Co., of Pittsburgh, remaining there a year and a half, and then worked until 1872 at the Penn forge (Everson, Preston & Co.) iron mill. He was employed by the same company for a time in a new mill at Scottdale, Pennsylvania, but returned and again worked at the Penn forge. He next spent three years in the employ of Bradley, Rice & Co., returning a second time to the Penn forge. At that time he was ordained a Methodist priest. He began his ministerial duties at Confluence, Pennsylvania.

After serious health problems, he spent two years each in Washington and Butler counties, holding two charges in each and preaching on alternate Sundays. He was then taken from the circuit, and was given charge of a church at Brownsville, Pennsylvania, for two years, and, in 1888, went to Johnstown, Pennsylvania, where he remained only six months, being compelled to give up his work on account of ill health. He went to Pittsburgh and opened a small grocery and notion store. After about four months of this work, he returned to the iron mills, and also engaged to improve the conditions of the workers there. From August, 1889 to October, 1894, he was employed as a steel rougher and roller in the Demmler mill of the United States sheet steel and tin plate company, and, after an idleness of eleven months, became roller in the tin mill of Oliver Bros, in Pittsburgh, working there until April, 1897, part of the time as acting manager.

In April, 1897, Shaffer was placed in the presidency of Amalgamated Steel by the advisory board of the association, was elected to the position a month later. He was a member of the Junior Order of American Mechanics, Royal Arcanum, and B. P. O. Elks. In 1902 he was appointed a member of the municipal improvement committee. He served as president of the union until 1905.

== Sources ==
Memoirs of Allegheny County, Pennsylvania. Personal and genealogical, vol. 1, Madison, WI: Northwestern Historical Association (1904), p. 31f. University of Pittsburgh Library System

Trade union offices
Preceded by W. M. Garland	President of the Amalgamated Association of Iron and Steel Workers; 1897–1905	Succeeded by Peter J. McArdle
