= Elmer J. Holland =

American politician

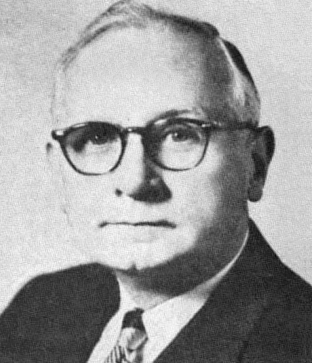

Member of the U.S. House of Representatives from Pennsylvania
- In office January 24, 1956 – August 9, 1968
- Preceded by: Vera Buchanan
- Succeeded by: Joseph M. Gaydos
- Constituency: 30th district (1956–1963); 20th district (1963–1968)
- In office May 19, 1942 – January 3, 1943
- Preceded by: Joseph A. McArdle
- Succeeded by: William I. Troutman
- Constituency: 33rd district

Member of the Pennsylvania House of Representatives
- In office 1934–1942

Member of the Pennsylvania Senate
- In office 1943–1956

Personal details
- Born: Elmer Joseph Holland; January 8, 1894 Pittsburgh, Pennsylvania, U.S.
- Died: August 9, 1968 (aged 74) Annapolis, Maryland, U.S.
- Resting place: Arlington National Cemetery
- Party: Democratic
- Education: Duquesne University; University of Montpellier

Elmer Joseph Holland (January 8, 1894 – August 9, 1968) was an American World War I veteran who served as a Democratic member of the U.S. House of Representatives from Pennsylvania during the mid-20th-century.

== Early life and career ==
Elmer Holland was born in Pittsburgh, Pennsylvania. He attended Duquesne University in Pittsburgh and the University of Montpellier, France. He graduated from Saumur Cavalry School, France, in 1919.

=== World War I ===
He served with the American Expeditionary Forces during World War I as a second lieutenant of Field Artillery.

=== Business career ===
He was engaged as sales and advertising manager for a glass manufacturer from 1915 to 1933.

=== State legislature ===
He was elected as a member of the Pennsylvania State House of Representatives from 1934 to 1942. He also served as the superintendent of highways and sewers in Pittsburgh from 1940 to 1942.

=== Congress ===
He was elected as a Democrat to the 77th United States Congress to fill the vacancy caused by the resignation of Joseph A. McArdle and served from May 19, 1942, to January 3, 1943. He was not a candidate for renomination in 1942.

He served as a major in the European Theater of Operations during World War II. He served as a member of the Pennsylvania State Senate from 1943 to 1956.

He was again elected to the 84th United States Congress to fill the vacancy caused by the death of Vera Buchanan.

== Death and burial ==
He served until his death from a heart attack in Annapolis, Maryland on August 9, 1968. He is buried in Arlington National Cemetery.

== See also ==
- List of members of the United States Congress who died in office (1950–1999)

U.S. House of Representatives
Preceded by Joseph A. McArdle	Member of the U.S. House of Representatives from Pennsylvania's 33rd congressional district 1942–1943	Succeeded by William I. Troutman
Preceded by Vera Buchanan	Member of the U.S. House of Representatives from Pennsylvania's 30th congressional district 1956–1963	Succeeded by District Eliminated
Preceded by James E. Van Zandt	Member of the U.S. House of Representatives from Pennsylvania's 20th congressional district 1963–1968	Succeeded by Joseph M. Gaydos
