= William I. Troutman =

American politician

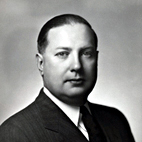
From the Biographical Directory of the United States Congress website

William Irvin Troutman (January 13, 1905 – January 27, 1971) was a Republican U.S. representative from Pennsylvania.

== Biography ==
Troutman was born in Shamokin, Northumberland County, Pennsylvania, he attended Franklin & Marshall College in Lancaster, Pennsylvania, where he was a member of the Phi Beta Kappa and Sigma Pi Fraternities. After graduating in 1927, he attended the University of Pennsylvania Law School, Philadelphia, Pennsylvania, earning his law degree in 1930. He was admitted to the bar in 1930, practicing law in his hometown of Shamokin, Pennsylvania.

He was elected to Congress in 1942 as an at-large member and served until his resignation on January 2, 1945. In addition to his service in the United States House of Representatives, he was also member of the Pennsylvania State Senate, Judge of the Court of Common Pleas of Northumberland County and the Court of Common Pleas in Philadelphia. Troutman died in Shamokin, Pennsylvania, and is interred at the Odd Fellows Cemetery.

== Sources ==
- United States Congress. "William I. Troutman (id: T000384)". Biographical Directory of the United States Congress.
- The Political Graveyard

U.S. House of Representatives
Preceded by Elmer J. Holland	Member of the U.S. House of Representatives from Pennsylvania's at-large congressional district 1943–1945	Succeeded by Samuel A. Weiss
