= Peter J. McArdle =

American politician

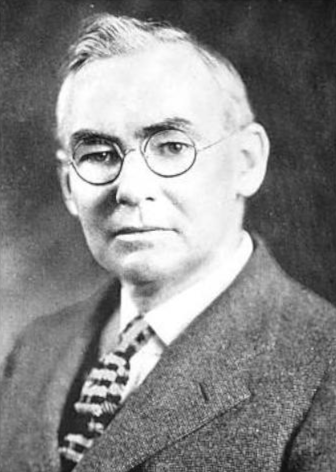
- Born: July 17, 1874; Belpre, Ohio, U.S.
- Died: January 1, 1940 (aged 65); Pittsburgh, Pennsylvania, U.S.
- Burial place: Calvary Catholic Cemetery
- Other names: P. J. McArdle
- Relatives: Joseph A. McArdle (son); Zachary Quinto (great-grandson)

Peter J. McArdle (1874–1940) also known as P. J. McArdle was a labor activist and local politician in Pittsburgh. A rolling mill worker and union council member influential in the Amalgamated Association of Iron and Steel Workers, he was elected to Pittsburgh City Council, serving four terms.

== Formative years and family ==
Peter J. McArdle was born in Belpre, Ohio on July 17, 1874. He grew up in Muncie, Indiana and then moved to Pittsburgh, Pennsylvania in 1905 when he was elected as president of the Amalgamated Association of Iron and Steel Workers.

McArdle's home in later life was on Bigham Street in the Mount Washington neighborhood of Pittsburgh. He died there on January 1, 1940, and was buried at Calvary Catholic Cemetery in Pittsburgh.

His son, Joseph A. McArdle, became a Pittsburgh city councilmember and United States Congressman. His great-grandson is actor Zachary Quinto; their family story was featured on the 2022 series finale of Who Do You Think You Are?, an NBC television series that explores the family histories of celebrities.

== Union activities and political career ==
A rolling mill worker and union council member who became influential in the Amalgamated Association of Iron and Steel Workers, Peter J. McArdle hosted the union's 1909 convention and was also involved in the Steel strike of 1919.

McArdle was then elected to Pittsburgh City Council, serving from 1911 to 1913. In 1912, he was a member of the city's planning commission when the Mt. Washington Roadway was proposed in 1912.

He was subsequently re-elected to the Pittsburgh city council, serving from 1916 to 1919, 1922 to 1930, and 1932 to 1940.

McArdle ran in the 1933 Republican primary for Pittsburgh mayor.

Trade union offices
Preceded by Theodore Schaffer	President of the Amalgamated Association of Iron and Steel Workers; 1905–1911	Succeeded by John Williams
