= Chauncey W. Reed =

American politician (1890–1956)

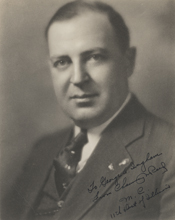

Chair of the House Judiciary Committee
- In office January 3, 1953 – January 3, 1955
- Preceded by: Emanuel Celler
- Succeeded by: Emanuel Celler

Member of the U.S. House of Representatives from Illinois
- In office January 3, 1935 – February 9, 1956
- Preceded by: Frank Reid
- Succeeded by: Russell W. Keeney
- Constituency: 11th district (1935–49); 14th district (1949–56)

Personal details
- Born: June 2, 1890 West Chicago, Illinois
- Died: February 9, 1956 (aged 65) Bethesda, Maryland
- Resting place: Glen Oak Cemetery in West Chicago, Illinois
- Party: Republican
- Spouse: Ella D. Stegen

Chauncey William Reed (June 2, 1890 – February 9, 1956) was an American World War I veteran, lawyer, and politician who served eleven terms as a U.S. representative from Illinois from 1935 until his death in 1956.

== Biography ==
Reed was born in West Chicago, Illinois to William Thomas Reed and Margaret Reed. Reed's father held several political positions.

=== Education and early career ===
Reed attended the local public schools and Northwestern University in Evanston, Illinois.

Reed was city treasurer of West Chicago, Illinois, in 1913 and 1914. He graduated from the Webster College of Law in Chicago, Illinois, in 1915. He was admitted to the bar that same year and commenced practice in Naperville, Illinois.

=== World War I ===
During World War I, Reed served as a sergeant in the 86th Infantry Division.

He resumed his law practice in Naperville upon his return from the war.

=== Political career ===
Reed served as State's Attorney of DuPage County from 1920 to 1935 and also served as chairman of the DuPage County Republican Central Committee from 1926 to 1934. On October 3, 1929, Reed married Ella D. Stegen. They would become the parents of three children.

==== Congress ====
Reed was elected as a Republican to the 74th United States Congress in 1934 and was later reelected to the ten succeeding Congresses, and served from January 3, 1935, until his death in Bethesda, Maryland on February 9, 1956.

He served as chairman of the Committee on the Judiciary for the 83rd Congress.

=== Interment ===
Reed was interred in Glen Oak Cemetery in his hometown of West Chicago, Illinois.

== See also ==
- List of members of the United States Congress who died in office (1950–1999)

U.S. House of Representatives
Preceded by Frank Reid	Member of the U.S. House of Representatives from Illinois's 11th congressional district January 3, 1935 – January 3, 1949	Succeeded by Chester Chesney
Preceded by Anton J. Johnson	Member of the U.S. House of Representatives from Illinois's 14th congressional district January 3, 1949 – February 9, 1956	Succeeded by Russell W. Keeney
