= Steel City Renegades =

- Founded: 2009
- League: Women's Spring Football League (2010-present)
- Team history: Steel City Renegades (2010-present)
- Based in: Pittsburgh, Pennsylvania
- Stadium: Highmark Stadium
- Colors: Red, Silver, Black
- President: Richard Nocito
- Head coach: Bob Gold
- Championships: 0

The Steel City Renegades are a team in the Women's Spring Football League set to begin play for 2010. They are based in Pittsburgh, Pennsylvania. They are the sister team to the Pittsburgh Storm of the North American Football League. They play their home games at Highmark Stadium.
