= Frank Buchanan (Pennsylvania politician) =

American politician

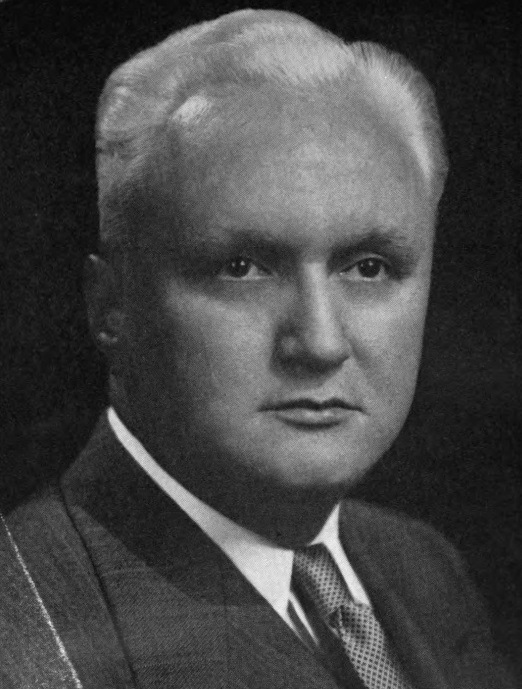
- Frontispiece of 1951's Frank Buchanan, Late a Representative from Pennsylvania

Member of the U.S. House of Representatives from Pennsylvania's 33rd district
- In office May 21, 1946 – April 27, 1951
- Preceded by: Samuel A. Weiss
- Succeeded by: Vera Buchanan

Personal details
- Born: December 1, 1902 McKeesport, Pennsylvania, U.S.
- Died: April 27, 1951 (aged 48)
- Party: Democratic
- Spouse: Vera Buchanan

Frank Buchanan (December 1, 1902 – April 27, 1951) was an American educator and businessman who served as a Democratic member of the U.S. House of Representatives from Pennsylvania from 1946 to 1951.

== Early life and education ==
Frank Buchanan was born in the Pittsburgh suburb of McKeesport, Pennsylvania. He married future Representative Vera Daerr on January 4, 1929. He graduated from the University of Pittsburgh in 1925 where he was a member of the Phi Gamma Delta fraternity.

He worked as a teacher in the high schools of Homestead, Pennsylvania and McKeesport from 1924 to 1928 and 1931 to 1942. From 1928 to 1931, he worked as an automobile dealer, and he also worked as an economic consultant from 1928 to 1946. He served as mayor of McKeesport from 1942 to 1946.

== Congress ==
Buchanan was elected as a Democrat to the 79th United States Congress to fill the vacancy caused by the resignation of Samuel A. Weiss. He was re-elected to the Eightieth, Eighty-first, and Eighty-second Congresses and served until his death in Bethesda, Maryland.

=== The Buchanan Committee ===
In 1950, Buchanan the center of controversy as the chair of the United States House Select Committee on Lobbying Activities (commonly known as the Buchanan Committee). Democrats had moved to establish it after winning the 1948 election as a means to investigate “direct and indirect” lobbying. While the committee investigated the far left Civil Rights Congress led by William L. Patterson, it singled out conservative organizations such as the anti-New Deal Committee for Constitutional Government and the libertarian Foundation for Economic Education.

A key goal the Democratic majority on the Buchanan Committee was to identify all people who had purchased John T. Flynn’s anti-New Deal book, The Road Ahead, from the Committee for Constitutional Government. Rumely and Patterson refused asserting that revealing contributors or the names of people who purchased books would intimidate potential financial supporters. On the recommendation of the Buchanan Committee, the House voted to cite both for Contempt of Congress. A majority of Republicans opposed the contempt citations of both Rumely and Patterson (despite Patterson's far left views).

When a federal court convicted Rumely on the contempt charge, a major backlash against the Buchanan Committee's investigation was already underway. The prestigious Editor and Publisher condemned the investigation as a plot to silence free speech. Libertarian journalist, Frank Chodorov, charged that “Buchananism...is a step in the direction of thought control” while libertarian publisher R.C. Hoiles said that the “issue involved is a constitutional right of any American to buy and sell reading matter without governmental interference and intimidation.” Rumely appealed his conviction and eventually prevailed in the U.S. Supreme Court in United States v. Rumely.

Buchanan did not live to see the Court's adverse decision. Weary of the controversy, he had already stepped down as chair of the Committee prior to this death at Bethesda Naval Hospital on April 27, 1951.

=== Death and vacancy filled by wife ===
His wife Vera Buchanan later died while serving in Congress, and they were the first husband and wife to both die while serving in Congress.

== See also ==
- List of members of the United States Congress who died in office (1950–1999)

== Sources ==
- United States Congress. "Frank Buchanan (id: B001002)". Biographical Directory of the United States Congress.
- Memorial services held in the House of Representatives together with remarks presented in eulogy of Frank Buchanan, late a representative from Pennsylvania

U.S. House of Representatives
Preceded by Samuel A. Weiss	Member of the U.S. House of Representatives from Pennsylvania's 33rd congressional district 1946–1951	Succeeded by Vera Buchanan
