= Samuel A. Weiss =

American politician (1902–1977)

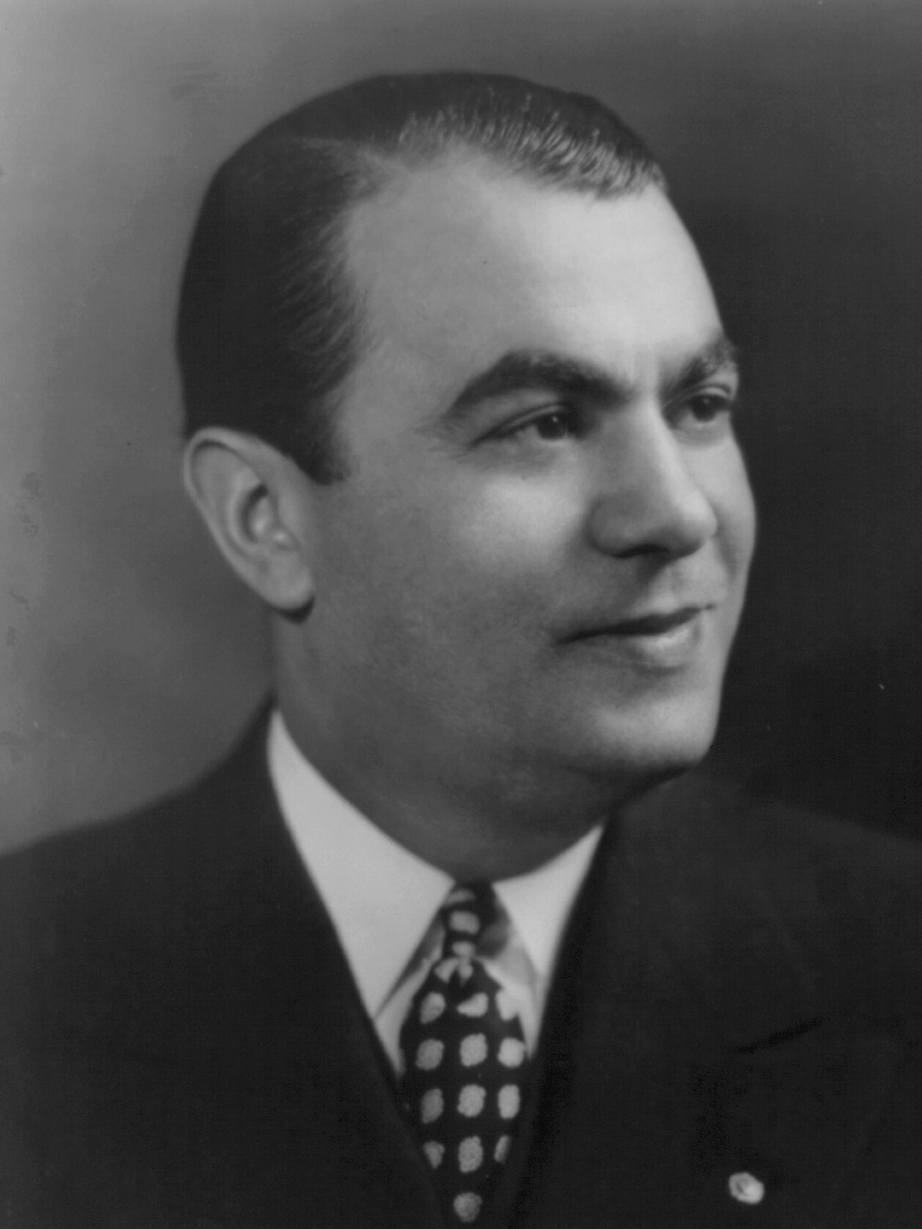

Member of the U.S. House of Representatives from Pennsylvania
- In office January 3, 1941 – January 7, 1946
- Preceded by: John McDowell
- Succeeded by: Frank Buchanan
- Constituency: 31st district (1941–1943); 30th district (1943–1945); 33rd district (1945–1946)

Member of the Pennsylvania House of Representatives
- In office 1935–1939

Personal details
- Born: Samuel Arthur Weiss; April 15, 1902 Krotowocz, Poland
- Died: February 1, 1977 (aged 74) Pennsylvania, U.S.
- Party: Democratic
- Spouse: Jeannette E. Hoffman
- Education: Duquesne University

Samuel Weiss
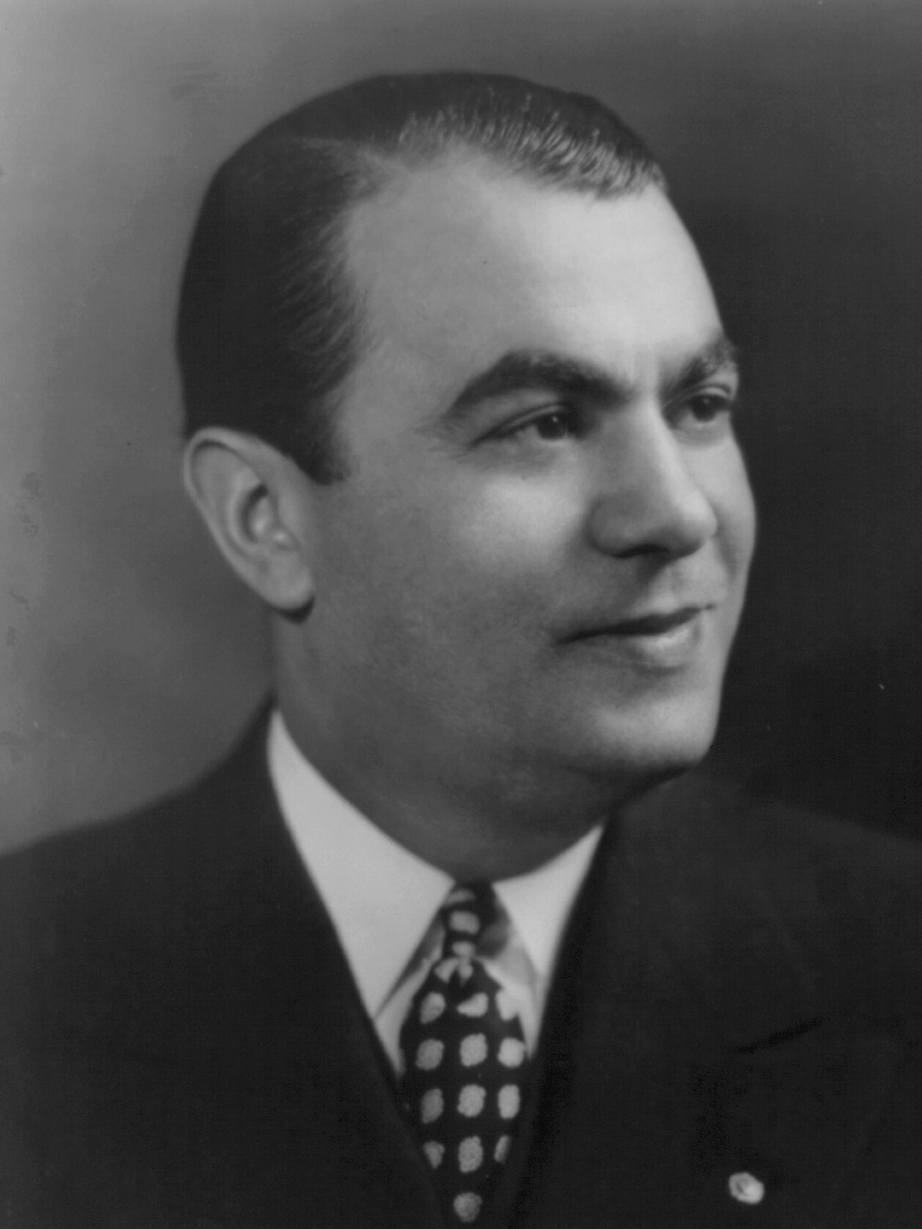

Profile
- Position: Quarterback

Career information
- College: Duquesne

Career history

Playing
- 1925–1926: Glassport Odds

deputy commissioner
- 1942–1950: National Football League

Samuel Arthur Weiss (April 15, 1902 – February 1, 1977) was an American attorney, professional football player, and Democratic politician. He represented parts of Pittsburgh, Pennsylvania and the surrounding area in the Pennsylvania House of Representatives from 1935 to 1939 and the United States House of Representatives from 1941 to 1946. He was also a Deputy Commissioner of the National Football League.

== Biography ==
Samuel Weiss was born in Krotowocz, Poland. He immigrated to the United States in July 1905 with his mother, Sadie, and younger sister, Sarah. They joined his father, Israel, who had immigrated in November 1904. The family settled in Homestead, Pennsylvania, and later moved to Glassport, Pennsylvania. He graduated from Duquesne University in Pittsburgh, Pennsylvania in 1925, and from the law department of the same university with a LL.B. in 1927 and J.D. in 1929. He played quarterback with the pro-football team Glassport Odds from 1925 to 1926. He married Jeannette E. Hoffman on June 30, 1930. He was the director of the Roselia Maternity Hospital in Pittsburgh. He served in the Pennsylvania State House of Representatives from 1935 to 1939. He joined the NFL as a referee in 1942 and served as Deputy Commissioner of the league from 1942 to 1950.

He was elected in 1940 as a Democrat to the 77th United States Congress and to the two succeeding Congresses. He served until his resignation on January 7, 1946. He was elected in November 1945 as a judge of the Allegheny County Court of Common Pleas for the term commencing in January 1946 and served in this capacity until he retired in 1967. After retiring from the bench, he was President of the Pennsylvania State Judicial Administration in 1968.

== Political positions ==
Weiss advocated for universal civil rights and for minorities, especially Zionism and Jewish issues.

In 1943, he wrote to President Roosevelt protesting the British White Paper which threatened to cut off Jewish immigration to Palestine and reduce them to a permanent minority by the following spring.. Representative Weiss's position was concordant with the previous year's Biltmore Conference, which described the policy as "cruel and indefensible in its denial of sanctuary to Jews fleeing from Nazi persecution."

That same year, he was involved in organizing over 50 witnesses for his congressional committee hearings on a bill to limit racial incitement by mail.

== See also ==
- List of Jewish members of the United States Congress

== Sources ==
- United States Congress. "Samuel A. Weiss (id: W000257)". Biographical Directory of the United States Congress.
- The Political Graveyard

U.S. House of Representatives
Preceded by John McDowell	Member of the U.S. House of Representatives from Pennsylvania's 31st congressional district 1941–1943	Succeeded by Herman P. Eberharter
Preceded by Thomas E. Scanlon	Member of the U.S. House of Representatives from Pennsylvania's 30th congressional district 1943–1945	Succeeded by Robert J. Corbett
Preceded by William I. Troutman	Member of the U.S. House of Representatives from Pennsylvania's 33rd congressional district 1945–1946	Succeeded by Frank Buchanan
