= Pennsylvania's 33rd congressional district =

Former U.S. House district in Pennsylvania

Coordinates: 40°30′N 80°00′W

- Obsolete district
- Created: 1903
- Eliminated: 1950
- Years active: 1903-1953

Pennsylvania's 33rd congressional district was one of Pennsylvania's districts of the United States House of Representatives.

== Geography ==
District boundaries set to cover parts of Allegheny County, Pennsylvania, near Pittsburgh, Pennsylvania.

== List of members representing the district ==
Member	Party	Years	Cong ress	Electoral history
District established March 4, 1923
M. Clyde Kelly (Crafton)	Republican	March 4, 1923 – March 3, 1933	68th 69th 70th 71st 72nd	Redistricted from the 30th district and re-elected in 1922. Re-elected in 1924. Re-elected in 1926. Re-elected in 1928. Re-elected in 1930. Redistricted to the 31st district.
Henry Ellenbogen (Pittsburgh)	Democratic	March 4, 1933 – January 3, 1938	73rd 74th 75th	Elected in 1932. Re-elected in 1934. Re-elected in 1936. Resigned to become a judge of the common pleas court of Allegheny County, Pennsylvania
Vacant		January 3, 1938 – January 3, 1939	75th	
Joseph A. McArdle (Pittsburgh)	Democratic	January 3, 1939 – January 5, 1942	76th 77th	Elected in 1938. Re-elected in 1940. Resigned to serve on the Pittsburgh City Council
Vacant		January 5, 1942 – May 19, 1942	77th	
Elmer J. Holland (Pittsburgh)	Democratic	May 19, 1942 – January 3, 1943	77th	Elected to finish McArdle's term. Retired.
District dissolved January 3, 1943
District re-established January 3, 1945
Samuel A. Weiss (Glassport)	Democratic	January 3, 1945 – January 7, 1946	79th	Redistricted from the 30th district and re-elected in 1944. Resigned to become judge of the Common Pleas Court of Allegheny County, Pennsylvania.
Vacant		January 7, 1946 – May 21, 1946	79th	
Frank Buchanan (McKeesport)	Democratic	May 21, 1946 – April 27, 1951	79th 80th 81st 82nd	Elected to finish Weiss's term. Re-elected in 1946. Re-elected in 1948. Re-elected in 1950. Died.
Vacant		April 27, 1951 – July 24, 1951	82nd	
Vera Buchanan (McKeesport)	Democratic	July 24, 1951 – January 3, 1953	82nd	Elected to finish her husband's term. Redistricted to the 30th district.
District dissolved January 3, 1953
