= List of United States representatives in the 70th Congress =

This is a complete list of United States representatives during the 70th United States Congress listed by seniority.

As an historical article, the districts and party affiliations listed reflect those during the 70th Congress (March 4, 1927 – March 3, 1929). Seats and party affiliations on similar lists for other congresses will be different for certain members.

Seniority depends on the date on which members were sworn into office. Since many members are sworn in on the same day, subsequent ranking is based on previous congressional service of the individual and then by alphabetical order by the last name of the representative.

Committee chairmanship in the House is often associated with seniority. However, party leadership is typically not associated with seniority.

Note: The "*" indicates that the representative/delegate may have served one or more non-consecutive terms while in the House of Representatives of the United States Congress.

== U.S. House seniority list ==
U.S. House seniority
Rank	Representative	Party	District	Seniority date (Previous service, if any)	No.# of term(s)	Notes
1	Thomas S. Butler	R	PA-08	March 4, 1897	16th term	Dean of the House; Died on May 26, 1928.
2	Gilbert N. Haugen	R	IA-04	March 4, 1899	15th term	Dean of the House after Butler's death.
3	Edward W. Pou	D	NC-04	March 4, 1901	14th term	
4	John Nance Garner	D	TX-15	March 4, 1903	13th term	
5	Thomas Montgomery Bell	D	GA-09	March 4, 1905	12th term	
6	Finis J. Garrett	D	TN-09	March 4, 1905	12th term	Left the House in 1929.
7	Martin B. Madden	R	IL-01	March 4, 1905	12th term	Died on April 27, 1928.
8	Willis C. Hawley	R	OR-01	March 4, 1907	11th term	
9	James C. McLaughlin	R	MI-09	March 4, 1907	11th term	
10	Adolph J. Sabath	D	IL-05	March 4, 1907	11th term	
11	Daniel Read Anthony Jr.	R	KS-01	May 23, 1907	11th term	Left the House in 1929.
12	Joseph W. Byrns Sr.	D	TN-06	March 4, 1909	10th term	
13	James W. Collier	D	MS-08	March 4, 1909	10th term	
14	William Walton Griest	R	PA-10	March 4, 1909	10th term	
15	William Allan Oldfield	D	AR-02	March 4, 1909	10th term	Died on November 19, 1928.
16	Edward T. Taylor	D	CO-04	March 4, 1909	10th term	
17	Robert L. Doughton	D	NC-08	March 4, 1911	9th term	
18	John Charles Linthicum	D	MD-04	March 4, 1911	9th term	
19	Stephen G. Porter	R	PA-32	March 4, 1911	9th term	
20	Charles M. Stedman	D	NC-05	March 4, 1911	9th term	
21	William R. Green	R	IA-09	June 5, 1911	9th term	Resigned on March 31, 1928.
22	James Benjamin Aswell	D	LA-08	March 4, 1913	8th term	
23	Frederick A. Britten	R	IL-09	March 4, 1913	8th term	
24	Edward E. Browne	R	WI-08	March 4, 1913	8th term	
25	John F. Carew	D	NY-18	March 4, 1913	8th term	
26	Charles F. Curry	R	CA-03	March 4, 1913	8th term	
27	Louis C. Cramton	R	MI-07	March 4, 1913	8th term	
28	Charles R. Crisp	D	GA-03	March 4, 1913; Previous service, 1896–1897.	9th term*	
29	James A. Frear	R	WI-10	March 4, 1913	8th term	
30	George Scott Graham	R	PA-02	March 4, 1913	8th term	
31	Albert Johnson	R	WA-03	March 4, 1913	8th term	
32	Edgar Raymond Kiess	R	PA-16	March 4, 1913	8th term	
33	Ladislas Lazaro	D	LA-07	March 4, 1913	8th term	Died on March 30, 1927.
34	Carl E. Mapes	R	MI-05	March 4, 1913	8th term	
35	Andrew Jackson Montague	D	VA-03	March 4, 1913	8th term	
36	John M. Morin	R	PA-34	March 4, 1913	8th term	Left the House in 1929.
37	James S. Parker	R	NY-29	March 4, 1913	8th term	
38	Percy Quin	D	MS-07	March 4, 1913	8th term	
39	Sam Rayburn	D	TX-04	March 4, 1913	8th term	
40	Nicholas J. Sinnott	R	OR-02	March 4, 1913	8th term	Resigned on May 31, 1928.
41	Addison T. Smith	R	ID-02	March 4, 1913	8th term	
42	Hatton W. Sumners	D	TX-05	March 4, 1913	8th term	
43	Allen T. Treadway	R	MA-01	March 4, 1913	8th term	
44	Otis Wingo	D	AR-04	March 4, 1913	8th term	
45	James P. Buchanan	D	TX-10	April 15, 1913	8th term	
46	James A. Gallivan	D	MA-12	April 3, 1914	8th term	Died on April 3, 1928.
47	Carl Vinson	D	GA-10	November 3, 1914	8th term	
48	Edward B. Almon	D	AL-08	March 4, 1915	7th term	
49	Isaac Bacharach	R	NJ-02	March 4, 1915	7th term	
50	Eugene Black	D	TX-01	March 4, 1915	7th term	Left the House in 1929.
51	John G. Cooper	R	OH-19	March 4, 1915	7th term	
52	George P. Darrow	R	PA-07	March 4, 1915	7th term	
53	S. Wallace Dempsey	R	NY-40	March 4, 1915	7th term	
54	Edward E. Denison	R	IL-25	March 4, 1915	7th term	
55	Cassius C. Dowell	R	IA-07	March 4, 1915	7th term	
56	Leonidas C. Dyer	R	MO-12	March 4, 1915; Previous service, 1911–1914.	9th term*	
57	Richard P. Freeman	R	CT-02	March 4, 1915	7th term	
58	Lindley H. Hadley	R	WA-02	March 4, 1915	7th term	
59	George Huddleston	D	AL-09	March 4, 1915	7th term	
60	W. Frank James	R	MI-12	March 4, 1915	7th term	
61	Royal C. Johnson	R	SD-02	March 4, 1915	7th term	
62	Charles Cyrus Kearns	R	OH-06	March 4, 1915	7th term	
63	David Hayes Kincheloe	D	KY-02	March 4, 1915	7th term	
64	Edward John King	R	IL-15	March 4, 1915	7th term	Died on February 17, 1929.
65	Frederick R. Lehlbach	R	NJ-10	March 4, 1915	7th term	
66	Nicholas Longworth	R	OH-01	March 4, 1915; Previous service, 1903–1913.	12th term*	Speaker of the House
67	Walter W. Magee	R	NY-35	March 4, 1915	7th term	Died on May 25, 1927.
68	Whitmell P. Martin	D	LA-03	March 4, 1915	7th term	
69	James V. McClintic	R	OK-07	March 4, 1915	7th term	
70	Louis Thomas McFadden	D	PA-15	March 4, 1915	7th term	
71	William Bacon Oliver	D	AL-06	March 4, 1915	7th term	
72	Christian William Ramseyer	R	IA-06	March 4, 1915	7th term	
73	William J. Sears	D	FL-04	March 4, 1915	7th term	Left the House in 1929.
74	Henry B. Steagall	D	AL-03	March 4, 1915	7th term	
75	John N. Tillman	D	AR-03	March 4, 1915	7th term	Left the House in 1929.
76	John Q. Tilson	R	CT-03	March 4, 1915; Previous service, 1909–1913.	9th term*	
77	Charles B. Timberlake	R	CO-02	March 4, 1915	7th term	
78	George H. Tinkham	R	MA-11	March 4, 1915	7th term	
79	Edward Hills Wason	R	NH-02	March 4, 1915	7th term	
80	Henry Winfield Watson	R	PA-09	March 4, 1915	7th term	
81	Thomas Sutler Williams	R	IL-24	March 4, 1915	7th term	
82	Riley J. Wilson	D	LA-05	March 4, 1915	7th term	
83	William R. Wood	R	IN-10	March 4, 1915	7th term	
84	Bertrand Snell	R	NY-31	November 2, 1915	7th term	
85	Henry Wilson Temple	R	PA-25	November 2, 1915; Previous service, 1913–1915.	8th term*	
86	William B. Bankhead	D	AL-10	March 4, 1917	6th term	
87	Thomas L. Blanton	D	TX-17	March 4, 1917	6th term	Left the House in 1929.
88	Charles Hillyer Brand	D	GA-08	March 4, 1917	6th term	
89	Guy Edgar Campbell	R	PA-36	March 4, 1917	6th term	
90	Tom Connally	D	TX-11	March 4, 1917	6th term	Left the House in 1929.
91	Frederick H. Dominick	D	SC-03	March 4, 1917	6th term	
92	Herbert J. Drane	D	FL-01	March 4, 1917	6th term	
93	Hubert Fisher	D	TN-10	March 4, 1917	6th term	
94	Burton L. French	R	ID-01	March 4, 1917; Previous service, 1903–1909 and 1911–1915.	11th term**	
95	Ira G. Hersey	R	ME-04	March 4, 1917	6th term	Left the House in 1929.
96	John Marvin Jones	D	TX-18	March 4, 1917	6th term	
97	Melville Clyde Kelly	R	PA-33	March 4, 1917; Previous service, 1913–1915.	7th term*	
98	Harold Knutson	R	MN-06	March 4, 1917	6th term	
99	Clarence F. Lea	D	CA-01	March 4, 1917	6th term	
100	William Washington Larsen	D	GA-12	March 4, 1917	6th term	
101	Joseph J. Mansfield	D	TX-09	March 4, 1917	6th term	
102	John Franklin Miller	R	WA-01	March 4, 1917	6th term	
103	Fred S. Purnell	R	IN-09	March 4, 1917	6th term	
104	Archie D. Sanders	R	NY-39	March 4, 1917	6th term	
105	William Francis Stevenson	D	SC-05	March 4, 1917	6th term	
106	Nathan Leroy Strong	R	PA-27	March 4, 1917	6th term	
107	Christopher D. Sullivan	D	NY-13	March 4, 1917	6th term	
108	Albert Henry Vestal	R	IN-08	March 4, 1917	6th term	
109	Wallace H. White Jr.	R	ME-02	March 4, 1917	6th term	
110	Frederick Nicholas Zihlman	R	MD-06	March 4, 1917	6th term	
111	Richard N. Elliott	R	IN-06	June 29, 1917	6th term	
112	Schuyler Merritt	R	CT-04	November 6, 1917	6th term	
113	William C. Wright	D	GA-04	January 16, 1918	6th term	
114	Anthony J. Griffin	D	NY-22	March 5, 1918	6th term	
115	S. Otis Bland	D	VA-01	July 2, 1918	6th term	
116	Florian Lampert	R	WI-06	November 5, 1918	6th term	
117	Ernest Robinson Ackerman	R	NJ-05	March 4, 1919	5th term	
118	Henry E. Barbour	R	CA-07	March 4, 1919	5th term	
119	James T. Begg	R	OH-13	March 4, 1919	5th term	Left the House in 1929.
120	William D. Boies	R	IA-11	March 4, 1919	5th term	Left the House in 1929.
121	John C. Box	D	TX-02	March 4, 1919	5th term	
122	Clay Stone Briggs	D	TX-07	March 4, 1919	5th term	
123	Clark Burdick	R	RI-01	March 4, 1919	5th term	
124	Carl Richard Chindblom	R	IL-10	March 4, 1919	5th term	
125	Charles A. Christopherson	R	SD-01	March 4, 1919	5th term	
126	Frank Crowther	R	NY-30	March 4, 1919	5th term	
127	Thomas H. Cullen	D	NY-04	March 4, 1919	5th term	
128	Ewin Lamar Davis	D	TN-05	March 4, 1919	5th term	
129	Lester J. Dickinson	R	IA-10	March 4, 1919	5th term	
130	Guy U. Hardy	R	CO-03	March 4, 1919	5th term	
131	Andrew J. Hickey	R	IN-13	March 4, 1919	5th term	
132	Homer Hoch	R	KS-04	March 4, 1919	5th term	
133	Claude Benton Hudspeth	D	TX-16	March 4, 1919	5th term	
134	Samuel Austin Kendall	R	PA-24	March 4, 1919	5th term	
135	William Chester Lankford	D	GA-11	March 4, 1919	5th term	
136	Robert Luce	R	MA-13	March 4, 1919	5th term	
137	Clarence MacGregor	R	NY-41	March 4, 1919	5th term	Resigned on December 31, 1928.
138	John McDuffie	D	AL-01	March 4, 1919	5th term	
139	James M. Mead	D	NY-42	March 4, 1919	5th term	
140	Earl C. Michener	R	MI-02	March 4, 1919	5th term	
141	C. Ellis Moore	R	OH-15	March 4, 1919	5th term	
142	B. Frank Murphy	R	OH-18	March 4, 1919	5th term	
143	Walter Newton	R	MN-05	March 4, 1919	5th term	Left the House in 1929.
144	Daniel A. Reed	R	NY-43	March 4, 1919	5th term	
145	John M. Robsion	R	KY-11	March 4, 1919	5th term	
146	Milton William Shreve	R	PA-29	March 4, 1919; Previous service, 1913–1915.	6th term*	
147	James H. Sinclair	R	ND-03	March 4, 1919	5th term	
148	John W. Summers	R	WA-04	March 4, 1919	5th term	
149	James G. Strong	R	KS-05	March 4, 1919	5th term	
150	J. Will Taylor	R	TN-02	March 4, 1919	5th term	
151	Charles J. Thompson	R	OH-05	March 4, 1919	5th term	
152	William N. Vaile	R	CO-01	March 4, 1919	5th term	Died on July 2, 1927.
153	Zebulon Weaver	D	NC-10	March 4, 1919; Previous service, 1917–1919.	6th term*	Left the House in 1929.
154	Hays B. White	R	KS-06	March 4, 1919	5th term	Left the House in 1929.
155	Richard Yates Jr.	R	IL	March 4, 1919	5th term	
156	Fritz G. Lanham	D	TX-12	April 19, 1919	5th term	
157	R. Walton Moore	D	VA-08	April 27, 1919	5th term	
158	James O'Connor	D	LA-01	June 5, 1919	5th term	
159	Patrick H. Drewry	D	VA-04	April 27, 1920	5th term	
160	Hamilton Fish Jr.	R	NY-26	November 2, 1920	5th term	
161	Harry C. Ransley	R	PA-03	November 2, 1920	5th term	
162	William B. Bowling	D	AL-05	December 14, 1920	5th term	Resigned on August 16, 1928.
163	Joseph D. Beck	R	WI-07	March 4, 1921	4th term	Left the House in 1929.
164	Carroll L. Beedy	R	ME-01	March 4, 1921	4th term	
165	Alfred L. Bulwinkle	D	NC-09	March 4, 1921	4th term	Left the House in 1929.
166	Olger B. Burtness	R	ND-01	March 4, 1921	4th term	
167	Theodore E. Burton	R	OH-22	March 4, 1921; Previous service, 1889–1891 and 1895–1909.	12th term**	Resigned on December 15, 1928.
168	Frank Clague	R	MN-02	March 4, 1921	4th term	
169	Ross A. Collins	D	MS-05	March 4, 1921	4th term	
170	Don B. Colton	R	UT-01	March 4, 1921	4th term	
171	James J. Connolly	R	PA-05	March 4, 1921	4th term	
172	Henry Allen Cooper	R	WI-01	March 4, 1921; Previous service, 1893–1919.	17th term*	
173	Joseph T. Deal	D	VA-02	March 4, 1921	4th term	Left the House in 1929.
174	William J. Driver	D	AR-01	March 4, 1921	4th term	
175	Charles L. Faust	R	MO-04	March 4, 1921	4th term	Died on December 17, 1928.
176	E. Hart Fenn	R	CT-01	March 4, 1921	4th term	
177	Roy G. Fitzgerald	R	OH-03	March 4, 1921	4th term	
178	Arthur M. Free	R	CA-08	March 4, 1921	4th term	
179	Louis A. Frothingham	R	MA-14	March 4, 1921	4th term	Died on August 23, 1928.
180	Hampton P. Fulmer	D	SC-07	March 4, 1921	4th term	
181	Daniel E. Garrett	D	TX-08	March 4, 1921; Previous service, 1913–1915 and 1917–1919.	6th term**	
182	Ralph Waldo Emerson Gilbert	D	KY-08	March 4, 1921	4th term	Left the House in 1929.
183	Thomas Alan Goldsborough	D	MD-01	March 4, 1921	4th term	
184	William C. Hammer	D	NC-07	March 4, 1921	4th term	
185	John C. Ketcham	R	MI-04	March 4, 1921	4th term	
186	John J. Kindred	D	NY-02	March 4, 1921; Previous service, 1911–1913.	5th term*	Left the House in 1929.
187	William F. Kopp	R	IA-01	March 4, 1921	4th term	
188	Stanley H. Kunz	D	IL-08	March 4, 1921	4th term	
189	Elmer O. Leatherwood	R	UT-02	March 4, 1921	4th term	
190	Bill G. Lowrey	D	MS-02	March 4, 1921	4th term	Left the House in 1929.
191	Homer L. Lyon	D	NC-06	March 4, 1921	4th term	Left the House in 1929.
192	John J. McSwain	D	SC-04	March 4, 1921	4th term	
193	M. Alfred Michaelson	R	IL-07	March 4, 1921	4th term	
194	William M. Morgan	R	OH-17	March 4, 1921	4th term	
195	John M. Nelson	R	WI-03	March 4, 1921; Previous service, 1906–1919.	11th term*	
196	Tilman B. Parks	D	AR-07	March 4, 1921	4th term	
197	Randolph Perkins	R	NJ-06	March 4, 1921	4th term	
198	John E. Rankin	D	MS-01	March 4, 1921	4th term	
199	B. Carroll Reece	R	TN-01	March 4, 1921	4th term	
200	Morgan G. Sanders	D	TX-03	March 4, 1921	4th term	
201	John N. Sandlin	D	LA-04	March 4, 1921	4th term	
202	John C. Speaks	R	OH-12	March 4, 1921	4th term	
203	Elliott W. Sproul	R	IL-03	March 4, 1921	4th term	
204	Fletcher B. Swank	D	OK-05	March 4, 1921	4th term	Left the House in 1929.
205	Phil Swing	R	CA-11	March 4, 1921	4th term	
206	Charles L. Underhill	R	MA-09	March 4, 1921	4th term	
207	William Williamson	R	SD-03	March 4, 1921	4th term	
208	Roy O. Woodruff	R	MI-10	March 4, 1921; Previous service, 1913–1915.	5th term*	
209	Harry M. Wurzbach	R	TX-14	March 4, 1921	4th term	Left the House in 1929.
210	Adam Martin Wyant	R	PA-31	March 4, 1921	4th term	
211	Lamar Jeffers	D	AL-04	June 7, 1921	4th term	
212	Cyrenus Cole	R	IA-05	August 1, 1921	4th term	
213	A. Piatt Andrew	R	MA-06	September 27, 1921	4th term	
214	John E. Nelson	R	ME-03	March 20, 1922	4th term	
215	Henry St. George Tucker	D	VA-10	March 21, 1922; Previous service, 1889–1897.	9th term*	
216	Guinn Williams	D	TX-13	May 22, 1922	4th term	
217	Charles Laban Abernethy	D	NC-03	November 7, 1922	4th term	
218	Charles L. Gifford	R	MA-16	November 7, 1922	4th term	
219	Richard S. Aldrich	R	RI-02	March 4, 1923	3rd term	
220	Miles C. Allgood	D	AL-07	March 4, 1923	3rd term	
221	William W. Arnold	D	IL-23	March 4, 1923	3rd term	
222	William Augustus Ayres	D	KS-08	March 4, 1923; Previous service, 1915–1921.	6th term*	
223	Robert L. Bacon	R	NY-01	March 4, 1923	3rd term	
224	Edward M. Beers	R	PA-18	March 4, 1923	3rd term	
225	Victor L. Berger	R	WI-05	March 4, 1923; Previous service, 1911–1913 and 1919.	5th term**	Left the House in 1929.
226	Loring Milton Black Jr.	D	NY-05	March 4, 1923	3rd term	
227	Sol Bloom	D	NY-19	March 4, 1923	3rd term	
228	John J. Boylan	D	NY-15	March 4, 1923	3rd term	
229	Charles Brand	R	OH-07	March 4, 1923	3rd term	
230	Gordon Browning	D	TN-08	March 4, 1923	3rd term	
231	T. Jeff Busby	D	MS-04	March 4, 1923	3rd term	
232	Harry C. Canfield	D	IN-04	March 4, 1923	3rd term	
233	Clarence Cannon	D	MO-09	March 4, 1923	3rd term	
234	Emanuel Celler	D	NY-10	March 4, 1923	3rd term	
235	William P. Connery Jr.	D	MA-07	March 4, 1923	3rd term	
236	Parker Corning	D	NY-28	March 4, 1923	3rd term	
237	Robert Crosser	D	OH-21	March 4, 1923; Previous service, 1913–1919.	6th term*	
238	Martin L. Davey	D	OH-14	March 4, 1923; Previous service, 1918–1921.	5th term*	Left the House in 1929.
239	Clement C. Dickinson	D	MO-06	March 4, 1923; Previous service, 1910–1921.	9th term*	Left the House in 1929.
240	Samuel Dickstein	D	NY-12	March 4, 1923	3rd term	
241	John M. Evans	D	MT-01	March 4, 1923; Previous service, 1913–1921.	7th term*	
242	Milton C. Garber	R	OK-08	March 4, 1923	3rd term	
243	Frank Gardner	D	IN-03	March 4, 1923	3rd term	Left the House in 1929.
244	Allard H. Gasque	D	SC-06	March 4, 1923	3rd term	
245	Arthur H. Greenwood	D	IN-02	March 4, 1923	3rd term	
246	Thomas W. Harrison	D	VA-07	March 4, 1923; Previous service, 1916–1922.	7th term*	Left the House in 1929.
247	William Wirt Hastings	D	OK-02	March 4, 1923; Previous service, 1915–1921.	6th term*	
248	William P. Holaday	R	IL-18	March 4, 1923	3rd term	
249	Edgar Howard	D	NE-03	March 4, 1923	3rd term	
250	Grant M. Hudson	R	MI-06	March 4, 1923	3rd term	
251	Cordell Hull	D	TN-04	March 4, 1923; Previous service, 1907–1921.	10th term*	
252	William E. Hull	R	IL-16	March 4, 1923	3rd term	
253	Meyer Jacobstein	D	NY-38	March 4, 1923	3rd term	Left the House in 1929.
254	Luther Alexander Johnson	D	TX-06	March 4, 1923	3rd term	
255	Jacob Banks Kurtz	R	PA-21	March 4, 1923	3rd term	
256	Ole J. Kvale	R	MN-07	March 4, 1923	3rd term	
257	Fiorello H. La Guardia	R	NY-20	March 4, 1923; Previous service, 1917–1919.	5th term*	
258	Scott Leavitt	R	MT-02	March 4, 1923	3rd term	
259	George W. Lindsay	D	NY-03	March 4, 1923	3rd term	
260	Ralph F. Lozier	D	MO-02	March 4, 1923	3rd term	
261	Samuel C. Major	D	MO-07	March 4, 1923; Previous service, 1919–1921.	4th term*	Left the House in 1929.
262	Joe J. Manlove	R	MO-15	March 4, 1923	3rd term	
263	Tom D. McKeown	D	OK-04	March 4, 1923; Previous service, 1917–1921.	5th term*	
264	Clarence J. McLeod	R	MI-13	March 4, 1923; Previous service, 1920–1921.	4th term*	
265	Samuel Davis McReynolds	D	TN-03	March 4, 1923	3rd term	
266	John McSweeney	D	OH-16	March 4, 1923	3rd term	Left the House in 1929.
267	Jacob L. Milligan	D	MO-03	March 4, 1923; Previous service, 1920–1921.	4th term*	
268	Charles A. Mooney	D	OH-20	March 4, 1923; Previous service, 1919–1921.	4th term*	
269	John H. Morehead	D	NE-01	March 4, 1923	3rd term	
270	John Morrow	D	NM	March 4, 1923	3rd term	Left the House in 1929.
271	David J. O'Connell	D	NY-09	March 4, 1923; Previous service, 1919–1921.	4th term*	
272	Frank A. Oliver	D	NY-23	March 4, 1923	3rd term	
273	Hubert H. Peavey	R	WI-11	March 4, 1923	3rd term	
274	George C. Peery	D	VA-09	March 4, 1923	3rd term	Left the House in 1929.
275	John Quayle	D	NY-07	March 4, 1923	3rd term	
276	Heartsill Ragon	D	AR-05	March 4, 1923	3rd term	
277	Henry Thomas Rainey	D	IL-20	March 4, 1923; Previous service, 1903–1921.	12th term*	
278	Henry Riggs Rathbone	R	IL	March 4, 1923	3rd term	Died on July 15, 1928.
279	Frank R. Reid	R	IL-11	March 4, 1923	3rd term	
280	Thomas J. B. Robinson	R	IA-03	March 4, 1923	3rd term	
281	Milton A. Romjue	D	MO-01	March 4, 1923; Previous service, 1917–1921.	5th term*	
282	Thomas L. Rubey	D	MO-16	March 4, 1923; Previous service, 1911–1921.	8th term*	Died on November 2, 1928.
283	John C. Schafer	R	WI-04	March 4, 1923	3rd term	
284	George J. Schneider	R	WI-09	March 4, 1923	3rd term	
285	Willis G. Sears	R	NE-02	March 4, 1923	3rd term	
286	George N. Seger	R	NJ-07	March 4, 1923	3rd term	
287	Ashton C. Shallenberger	D	NE-05	March 4, 1923; Previous service, 1901–1903 and 1915–1919.	6th term**	Left the House in 1929.
288	Robert G. Simmons	R	NE-06	March 4, 1923	3rd term	
289	William H. Sproul	R	KS-03	March 4, 1923	3rd term	
290	Gale H. Stalker	R	NY-37	March 4, 1923	3rd term	
291	John Taber	R	NY-36	March 4, 1923	3rd term	
292	Maurice Thatcher	R	KY-05	March 4, 1923	3rd term	
293	Mell G. Underwood	D	OH-11	March 4, 1923	3rd term	
294	Bird J. Vincent	R	MI-08	March 4, 1923	3rd term	
295	J. Mayhew Wainwright	R	NY-25	March 4, 1923	3rd term	
296	Laurence Hawley Watres	R	PA-11	March 4, 1923	3rd term	
297	Royal Hurlburt Weller	D	NY-21	March 4, 1923	3rd term	Died on March 1, 1929.
298	George Austin Welsh	R	PA-06	March 4, 1923	3rd term	
299	T. Webber Wilson	D	MS-06	March 4, 1923	3rd term	Left the House in 1929.
300	Charles E. Winter	R	WY	March 4, 1923	3rd term	Left the House in 1929.
301	Clifton A. Woodrum	D	VA-06	March 4, 1923	3rd term	
302	Morton D. Hull	R	IL-02	April 3, 1923	3rd term	
303	J. Lister Hill	D	AL-02	August 14, 1923	3rd term	
304	Samuel B. Hill	D	WA-05	September 25, 1923	3rd term	
305	James B. Reed	D	AR-06	October 6, 1923	3rd term	Left the House in 1929.
306	Thomas A. Doyle	D	IL-04	November 6, 1923	3rd term	
307	Ernest Willard Gibson	R	VT-02	November 6, 1923	3rd term	
308	John H. Kerr	D	NC-02	November 6, 1923	3rd term	
309	John J. O'Connor	D	NY-16	November 6, 1923	3rd term	
310	Anning Smith Prall	D	NY-11	November 6, 1923	3rd term	
311	Thaddeus C. Sweet	R	NY-32	November 6, 1923	3rd term	Died on May 1, 1928.
312	Fred M. Vinson	D	KY-09	January 24, 1924	3rd term	Left the House in 1929.
313	James Z. Spearing	D	LA-02	April 22, 1924	3rd term	
314	Stephen Warfield Gambrill	D	MD-05	November 4, 1924	3rd term	
315	Thomas Hall	R	ND-02	November 4, 1924	3rd term	
316	Charles Adkins	R	IL-19	March 4, 1925	2nd term	
317	John Clayton Allen	R	IL-14	March 4, 1925	2nd term	
318	August H. Andresen	R	MN-03	March 4, 1925	2nd term	
319	Samuel S. Arentz	R	NV	March 4, 1925; Previous service, 1921–1923.	3rd term*	
320	Oscar L. Auf der Heide	D	NJ-11	March 4, 1925	2nd term	
321	Carl G. Bachmann	R	WV-01	March 4, 1925	2nd term	
322	Frank Llewellyn Bowman	R	WV-02	March 4, 1925	2nd term	
323	Elbert S. Brigham	R	VT-01	March 4, 1925	2nd term	
324	William Leighton Carss	D	MN-08	March 4, 1925; Previous service, 1919–1921.	3rd term*	Left the House in 1929.
325	Albert E. Carter	R	CA-06	March 4, 1925	2nd term	
326	William W. Chalmers	R	OH-09	March 4, 1925; Previous service, 1921–1923.	3rd term*	
327	Virgil Chapman	D	KY-07	March 4, 1925	2nd term	Left the House in 1929.
328	Edward E. Cox	D	GA-02	March 4, 1925	2nd term	
329	Maurice E. Crumpacker	R	OR-03	March 4, 1925	2nd term	Died on July 24, 1927.
330	Frederick M. Davenport	R	NY-33	March 4, 1925	2nd term	
331	John J. Douglass	D	MA-10	March 4, 1925	2nd term	
332	Charles Aubrey Eaton	R	NJ-04	March 4, 1925	2nd term	
333	Charles Gordon Edwards	D	GA-01	March 4, 1925; Previous service, 1907–1917.	7th term*	
334	Edward Everett Eslick	D	TN-07	March 4, 1925	2nd term	
335	William T. Fitzgerald	R	OH-04	March 4, 1925	2nd term	Left the House in 1929.
336	Thomas B. Fletcher	D	OH-08	March 4, 1925	2nd term	Left the House in 1929.
337	Franklin W. Fort	R	NJ-09	March 4, 1925	2nd term	
338	Frank H. Foss	R	MA-03	March 4, 1925	2nd term	
339	Allen J. Furlow	R	MN-01	March 4, 1925	2nd term	Left the House in 1929.
340	James P. Glynn	R	CT-05	March 4, 1925; Previous service, 1915–1923.	6th term*	
341	Benjamin M. Golder	R	PA-04	March 4, 1925	2nd term	
342	Godfrey G. Goodwin	R	MN-10	March 4, 1925	2nd term	
343	Robert A. Green	D	FL-02	March 4, 1925	2nd term	
344	Fletcher Hale	R	NH-01	March 4, 1925	2nd term	
345	Albert R. Hall	R	IN-11	March 4, 1925	2nd term	
346	Butler B. Hare	D	SC-02	March 4, 1925	2nd term	
347	David Hogg	R	IN-12	March 4, 1925	2nd term	
348	Robert G. Houston	R	DE	March 4, 1925	2nd term	
349	Edward M. Irwin	R	IL-22	March 4, 1925	2nd term	
350	Thomas A. Jenkins	R	OH-10	March 4, 1925	2nd term	
351	Noble J. Johnson	R	IN-05	March 4, 1925	2nd term	
352	William Richard Johnson	R	IL-13	March 4, 1925	2nd term	
353	Florence Prag Kahn	R	CA-04	March 4, 1925	2nd term	
354	Bolivar E. Kemp	D	LA-06	March 4, 1925	2nd term	
355	F. Dickinson Letts	R	IA-02	March 4, 1925	2nd term	
356	Frederick William Magrady	R	PA-17	March 4, 1925	2nd term	
357	Joseph William Martin Jr.	R	MA-15	March 4, 1925	2nd term	
358	Thomas S. McMillan	D	SC-01	March 4, 1925	2nd term	
359	Franklin Menges	R	PA-22	March 4, 1925	2nd term	
360	William L. Nelson	D	MO-08	March 4, 1925; Previous service, 1919–1921.	3rd term*	
361	Mary Teresa Norton	D	NJ-12	March 4, 1925	2nd term	
362	Harcourt J. Pratt	R	NY-27	March 4, 1925	2nd term	
363	Harry E. Rowbottom	R	IN-01	March 4, 1925	2nd term	
364	Samuel Rutherford	D	GA-06	March 4, 1925	2nd term	
365	Andrew Lawrence Somers	D	NY-06	March 4, 1925	2nd term	
366	George R. Stobbs	R	MA-04	March 4, 1925	2nd term	
367	James F. Strother	R	WV-05	March 4, 1925	2nd term	Left the House in 1929.
368	Lloyd Thurston	R	IA-08	March 4, 1925	2nd term	
369	Ralph E. Updike	R	IN-07	March 4, 1925	2nd term	Left the House in 1929.
370	Lindsay Carter Warren	D	NC-01	March 4, 1925	2nd term	
371	Joseph Whitehead	D	VA-05	March 4, 1925	2nd term	
372	William Madison Whittington	D	MS-03	March 4, 1925	2nd term	
373	Edith Nourse Rogers	R	MA-05	June 30, 1925	2nd term	
374	Joseph L. Hooper	R	MI-03	August 18, 1925	2nd term	
375	Henry L. Bowles	R	MA-02	September 29, 1925	2nd term	Left the House in 1929.
376	John William Moore	D	KY-03	December 26, 1925	2nd term	Left the House in 1929.
377	Harry Lane Englebright	R	CA-02	August 31, 1926	2nd term	
378	Richard J. Welch	R	CA-05	August 31, 1926	2nd term	
379	John J. Cochran	D	MO-11	November 2, 1926	2nd term	
380	Frederick W. Dallinger	R	MA-08	November 2, 1926; Previous service, 1915–1925.	7th term*	
381	Frank P. Bohn	R	MI-11	March 4, 1927	1st term	
382	John T. Buckbee	R	IL-12	March 4, 1927	1st term	
383	Robert Grey Bushong	R	PA-14	March 4, 1927	1st term	Left the House in 1929.
384	Patrick J. Carley	D	NY-08	March 4, 1927	1st term	
385	Wilburn Cartwright	D	OK-03	March 4, 1927	1st term	
386	John J. Casey	D	PA-12	March 4, 1927; Previous service, 1913–1917, 1919–1921 and 1923–1925.	5th term***	
387	James Mitchell Chase	R	PA-23	March 4, 1927	1st term	
388	Robert H. Clancy	R	MI-01	March 4, 1927; Previous service, 1923–1925.	2nd term*	
389	John D. Clarke	R	NY-34	March 4, 1927; Previous service, 1921–1925.	3rd term*	
390	Thomas Cunningham Cochran	R	PA-28	March 4, 1927	1st term	
391	William W. Cohen	D	NY-17	March 4, 1927	1st term	Left the House in 1929.
392	William Purington Cole Jr.	D	MD-02	March 4, 1927	1st term	Left the House in 1929.
393	George H. Combs Jr.	D	MO-05	March 4, 1927	1st term	Left the House in 1929.
394	Joe Crail	R	CA-10	March 4, 1927	1st term	
395	Lewis Williams Douglas	D	AZ	March 4, 1927	1st term	
396	Isaac Hoffer Doutrich	R	PA-19	March 4, 1927	1st term	
397	Edward T. England	R	WV-06	March 4, 1927	1st term	Left the House in 1929.
398	Harry Allison Estep	R	PA-35	March 4, 1927	1st term	
399	William E. Evans	R	CA-09	March 4, 1927	1st term	
400	James M. Fitzpatrick	D	NY-24	March 4, 1927	1st term	
401	James F. Fulbright	D	MO-14	March 4, 1927; Previous service, 1923–1925.	2nd term*	Left the House in 1929.
402	William Voris Gregory	D	KY-01	March 4, 1927	1st term	
403	Ulysses Samuel Guyer	R	KS-02	March 4, 1927; Previous service, 1924–1925.	2nd term*	
404	Homer W. Hall	R	IL-17	March 4, 1927	1st term	
405	James M. Hazlett	R	PA-01	March 4, 1927	1st term	Resigned on October 20, 1927.
406	Harold G. Hoffman	R	NJ-03	March 4, 1927	1st term	
407	Clifford R. Hope	R	KS-07	March 4, 1927	1st term	
408	Everette B. Howard	D	OK-01	March 4, 1927; Previous service, 1919–1921 and 1923–1925.	3rd term**	Left the House in 1929.
409	James A. Hughes	R	WV-04	March 4, 1927; Previous service, 1901–1915.	8th term*	
410	James T. Igoe	D	IL-06	March 4, 1927	1st term	
411	Jed Johnson	D	OK-06	March 4, 1927	1st term	
412	Charles A. Kading	R	WI-02	March 4, 1927	1st term	
413	Everett Kent	D	PA-30	March 4, 1927; Previous service, 1923–1925.	2nd term*	Left the House in 1929.
414	Katherine G. Langley	R	KY-10	March 4, 1927	1st term	
415	James Russell Leech	R	PA-20	March 4, 1927	1st term	
416	Melvin Maas	R	MN-04	March 4, 1927	1st term	
417	James Earl Major	D	IL-21	March 4, 1927; Previous service, 1923–1925.	2nd term*	Left the House in 1929.
418	Louis Monast	R	RI-03	March 4, 1927	1st term	Left the House in 1929.
419	Paul J. Moore	D	NJ-08	March 4, 1927	1st term	Left the House in 1929.
420	Henry D. Moorman	D	KY-04	March 4, 1927	1st term	Left the House in 1929.
421	Henry F. Niedringhaus	R	MO-10	March 4, 1927	1st term	
422	John N. Norton	D	NE-04	March 4, 1927	1st term	Left the House in 1929.
423	William Smith O'Brien	D	WV-03	March 4, 1927	1st term	Left the House in 1929.
424	Cyrus Maffet Palmer	R	PA-13	March 4, 1927	1st term	Left the House in 1929.
425	Vincent Luke Palmisano	D	MD-03	March 4, 1927	1st term	
426	Conrad Selvig	R	MN-09	March 4, 1927	1st term	
427	William I. Sirovich	D	NY-14	March 4, 1927	1st term	
428	Leslie Jasper Steele	D	GA-05	March 4, 1927	1st term	
429	J. Howard Swick	R	PA-26	March 4, 1927	1st term	
430	Malcolm C. Tarver	D	GA-07	March 4, 1927	1st term	
431	Orie Solomon Ware	D	KY-06	March 4, 1927	1st term	Left the House in 1929.
432	Clyde Williams	D	MO-13	March 4, 1927	1st term	Left the House in 1929.
433	Charles A. Wolverton	R	NJ-01	March 4, 1927	1st term	
434	Tom A. Yon	D	FL-03	March 4, 1927	1st term	
	René L. De Rouen	D	LA-07	August 23, 1927	1st term	
	Franklin F. Korell	R	OR-03	October 18, 1927	1st term	
	James M. Beck	R	PA-01	November 8, 1927	1st term	
	Clarence E. Hancock	R	NY-35	November 8, 1927	1st term	
	Charles Tatgenhorst Jr.	R	OH-02	November 8, 1927	1st term	Left the House in 1929.
	S. Harrison White	D	CO-01	November 15, 1927	1st term	Left the House in 1929.
	Earl W. Vincent	R	IA-09	June 4, 1928	1st term	Left the House in 1929.
	Robert R. Butler	R	OR-02	November 6, 1928	1st term	
	Francis D. Culkin	R	NY-32	November 6, 1928	1st term	
	John William McCormack	D	MA-12	November 6, 1928	1st term	
	LaFayette L. Patterson	D	AL-05	November 6, 1928	1st term	
	Richard B. Wigglesworth	R	MA-14	November 6, 1928	1st term	
	James Wolfenden	R	PA-08	November 6, 1928	1st term	
	Pearl Peden Oldfield	D	AR-02	January 9, 1929	1st term	
	David W. Hopkins	R	MO-04	February 5, 1929	1st term	

== Delegates ==
Rank	Delegate	Party	District	Seniority date (Previous service, if any)	No.# of term(s)	Notes
1	Félix Córdova Dávila		PR	August 7, 1917	6th term	
2	Isauro Gabaldon		PHL	March 4, 1920	5th term	
3	Daniel Sutherland	R	AK	March 4, 1921	4th term	
4	Pedro Guevara	Nac	PHL	March 4, 1923	3rd term	
5	Victor S. K. Houston	R	HI	March 4, 1927	1st term	

== See also ==
- 70th United States Congress
- List of United States congressional districts
- List of United States senators in the 70th Congress
