= Air Mail Act of 1925 =

United States federal legislation regarding postal service

- Long title: An Act to encourage commercial aviation and to authorize the Postmaster General to contract for air mail service.
- Nicknames: Kelly Act
- Enacted by: the 68th United States Congress
- Effective: February 2, 1925

Citations
- Public law: Pub. L. 68–359
- Statutes at Large: 43 Stat. 805, Chap. 128

Codification
- Titles amended: 39 U.S.C.:Postal Service
- U.S.C. sections created: 39 U.S.C. ch. 54 § 5401 et seq.

Legislative history
- Introduced in the House as H.R. 7064 by Melville Clyde Kelly (R–PA) on May 13, 1924; Passed the House on December 18, 1924 (292-15); Passed the Senate on January 27, 1925 (51-23, in lieu of S. 3674); Signed into law by President Calvin Coolidge on February 2, 1925

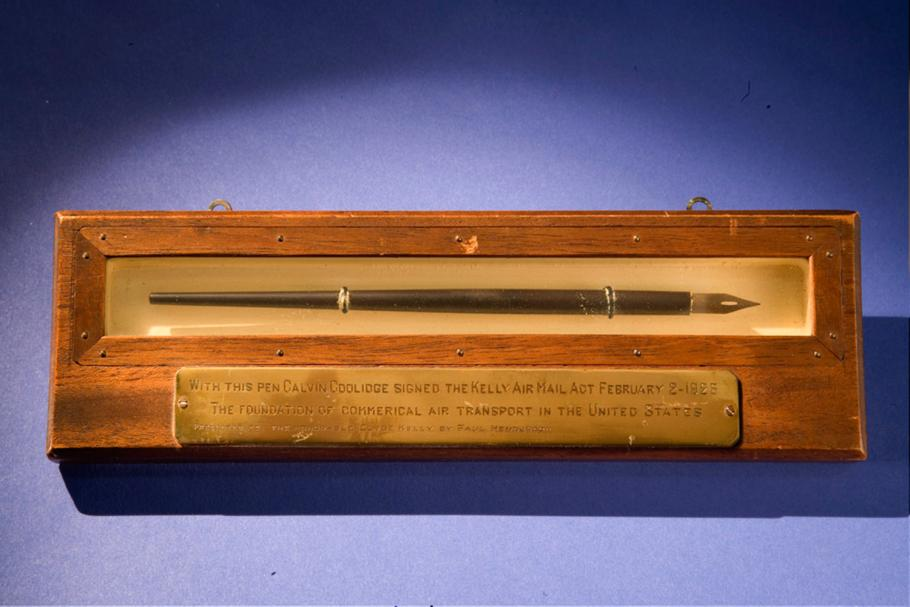
Pen used by President Coolidge to sign the Act

The Air Mail Act of 1925, also known as the Kelly Act, was a key piece of legislation that intended to free the airmail from total control by the Post Office Department. In short, it allowed the Postmaster General to contract private companies to carry mail. The Act was sponsored by Pennsylvania representative Clyde Kelly, and became legislation in February that year.

The act created a bidding period for small airmail routes, setting rates and subsidies contractors would receive for flying mail. The first contracts were awarded to Colonial Air Transport, National Air Transport, Robertson Aircraft Corporation, Western Air Express and Varney Air Lines. Contractors were paid $3.00 per pound of mail for the first 1,000 miles traveled. Due to the surplus aircraft available after the First World War, particularly de Havilland DH-4s, the act bolstered a nascent aviation industry in the United States.

By 1927, over 2.5 million miles were traveled by US Airmail Service planes, carrying over 22 million letters. Further regulation ensued quite rapidly, such as those issued by second assistant postmaster general Col. Paul Henderson, which required pilots and their aircraft to receive a certificate of airworthiness from the Post Office, and that each company needed to post at least ten thousand dollars in good faith bonds.

== Associated United States Federal Statutes ==
United States legislation authorizing aerial navigation and contract services for the transportation of United States air mail.

Date of Enactment	Public Law Number	U.S. Statute Citation	U.S. Legislative Bill	U.S. Presidential Administration
June 3, 1926	P.L. 69-331	44 Stat. 692	H.R. 11841	Calvin Coolidge
March 8, 1928	P.L. 70-107	45 Stat. 248	H.R. 7213	Calvin Coolidge
May 17, 1928	P.L. 70-410	45 Stat. 594	H.R. 8337	Calvin Coolidge
March 2, 1929	P.L. 70-904	45 Stat. 1449	H.R. 16131	Calvin Coolidge
April 29, 1930	P.L. 71-178	46 Stat. 259	H.R. 11704	Herbert C. Hoover
March 27, 1934	P.L. 73-140	48 Stat. 508	H.R. 7966	Franklin D. Roosevelt
June 12, 1934	P.L. 73-308	48 Stat. 933	S. 3170	Franklin D. Roosevelt
August 14, 1935	P.L. 74-270	49 Stat. 614	H.R. 6511	Franklin D. Roosevelt

== See also ==
- Air Mail scandal
- Aviation Service Act
- Aviation Act of 1917
