= Mount Robert Barron =

Mountain in Alaska, United States

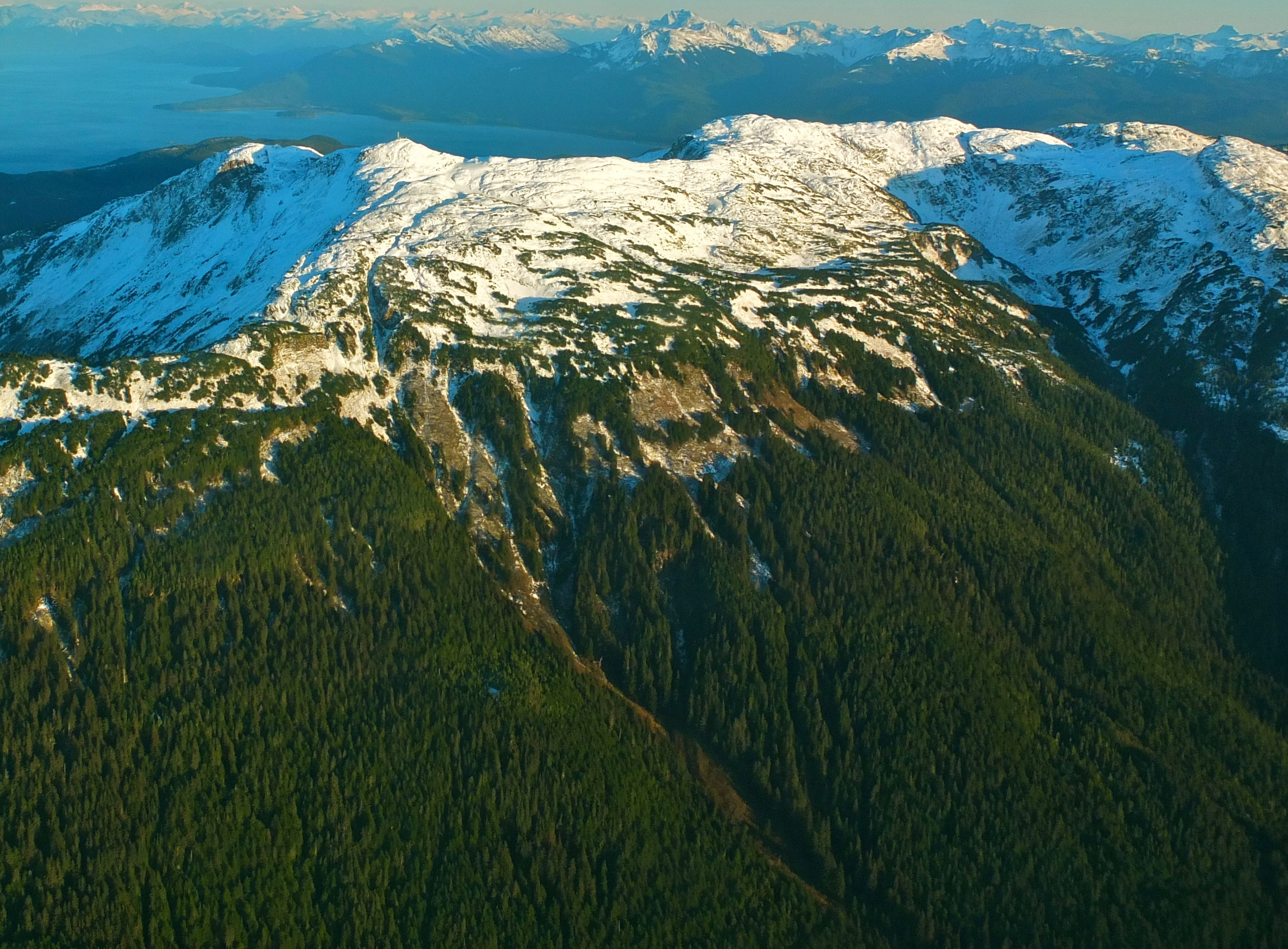
- Mount Robert Barron, northwest aspect

Highest point
- Elevation: 3,475 ft (1,059 m)
- Prominence: 3,425 ft (1,044 m)
- Isolation: 11.67 mi (18.78 km)
- Coordinates: 58°13′35″N 134°50′15″W

Geography
- Location within Alaska
- Interactive map of Mount Robert Barron
- Location: Tongass National Forest; Hoonah-Angoon; Alaska, United States
- Parent range: Alexander Archipelago
- Topo map: USGS Juneau A-3

Climbing
- Easiest route: 7-mile unmaintained trail

Mount Robert Barron is a 3,475-foot (1,059 m) elevation mountain summit located on Admiralty Island in the Alexander Archipelago, in the U.S. state of Alaska. It is the highest point on the island's Mansfield Peninsula, and is situated 16 mi (26 km) west-southwest of Juneau, on land managed by Tongass National Forest. Although modest in elevation, relief is significant since the peak rises up from tidewater at Funter Bay on Lynn Canal in less than two miles, and from Stephens Passage to the east in less than three miles.

== History ==
This geographic feature was named by the United States Coast and Geodetic Survey in 1919 for Robert James Barron (1896–1917), son of James T. Barron, both of whom were instrumental in developing the Funter Bay region. Robert enlisted with the Aviation Service on June 2, 1917; and, on August 22, 1917, sacrificed his life in an effort to rescue two imperiled fellow pilots when he drowned in the Delaware River as the airplane he was flying fell into the water. The War Department honored his heroism by naming Barron Field in Texas after him. The mountain's name was officially adopted in 1919 by the U.S. Board on Geographic Names.

== Climate ==
Based on the Köppen climate classification, Mount Robert Barron has a subarctic climate with cold, snowy winters, and mild summers. Weather systems coming off the Gulf of Alaska are forced upwards by the mountains (orographic lift), causing heavy precipitation in the form of rainfall and snowfall. Winter temperatures can drop below −20 °C with wind chill factors below −30 °C. The month of July offers the most favorable weather for viewing or climbing Mount Robert Barron.

== Gallery ==
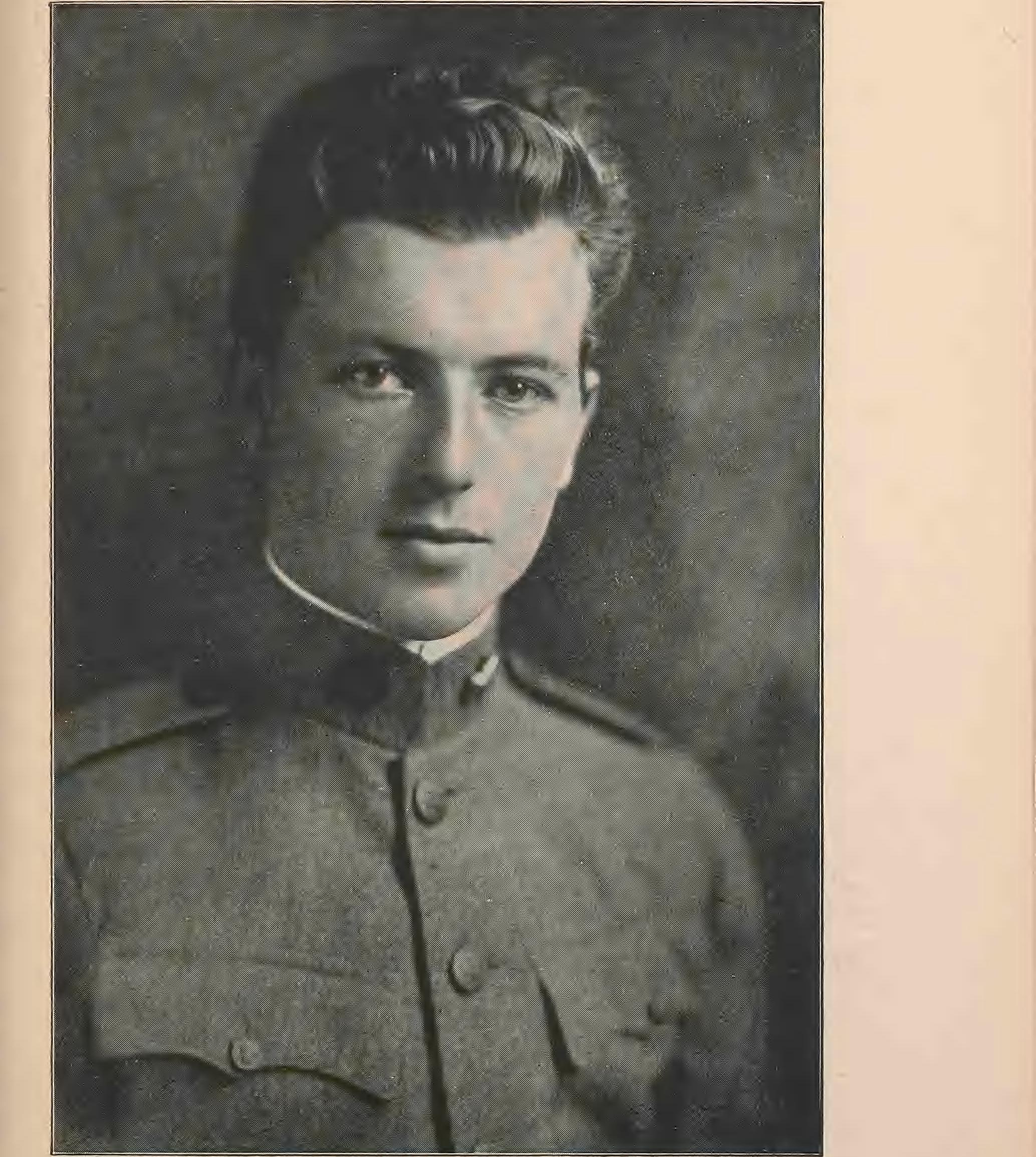
Robert Barron

== See also ==
- List of mountain peaks of Alaska
- Geography of Alaska
