= Aviation Act of 1917 =

- Long title: An Act to authorize the President to increase temporarily the Signal Corps of the Army and to purchase, manufacture, maintain, repair, and operate airships, and to make appropriations therefor, and for other purposes.
- Enacted by: the 65th United States Congress
- Effective: July 24, 1917

Citations
- Public law: Pub. L. 65–29
- Statutes at Large: 40 Stat. 243

Legislative history
- Introduced in the House as H.R. 5326 by S. Hubert Dent Jr. (D–AL); Signed into law by President Woodrow Wilson on July 24, 1917

Aviation Act of 1917 was a United States military appropriations bill authorizing a temporary increase for the United States Army Signal Corps. The Act of Congress authorized provisions for airship or dirigible operations governed by the U.S. Army Signal Corps Aeronautical Division. The legislation provided United States President Woodrow Wilson emergency authority for the maintenance, manufacture, operation, purchase, and repair of airships and associated aerial machines.

== Sections of the Act ==
In an attempt to meet the progressive necessities of World War I, House bill 5326 was penned as ten sections by the United States 65th Congressional session.

Sec. 1 – Temporary Increase of Army Signal Corps and Aviation Sections

Sec. 2 – Additional Commissioned Personnel Authorized

Qualifications
Appointments by U.S. President
Appointments by U.S. President and Senate

Sec. 3 – Additional Enlisted Men by Enlistment or Draft

Age limit for men drafted
Chauffeur grades created
Chauffeur pay and rank

Sec. 4 – Organization of Tactical Units

Headquarters and detachment units

Sec. 5 – General Officers Appointed for Staff and Other Duties

Temporary appointments for created vacancies

Sec. 6 – Rating of Aviators and Aeronauts

Certificates of qualifications
Examinations
Ratings for service requirements
Exceptions in war time
Aeronauts rank increase
Flight duty financial compensation

Sec. 7 – Ratings of Enlisted Mechanicians

Balloon mechanicians compensation

Sec. 8 – U.S. Army Comprehensive Compensation

U.S. Army troop strength levels

Sec. 9 – Emergency Authority for Airships and Aerial Machines

Buildings and motor vehicles
Aviation stations
Sites and buildings
Use of public lands
Improvements of sites
Buildings and structures
Water, lights, and plumbing
Roads and wharves
Subsistence equipments
Fuel supplies
Construction machinery and tools
Special clothing
Domestic and abroad travel expenses
Vocational training
Compensation for reserve officers and enlisted personnel called into service
Pay accounts
Development of airplanes and engines
Manufacturing plants maintenance
Schools for aviation technical instructions
New equipment exchanges
Foreign instructors travel compensation within the United States

Sec. 10 – Appropriation

== Associated United States Federal Statutes ==
United States legislation for the governance, service, and training of airships designed and developed for military operations.

U.S. Statutes for Aviation Standards

Date of Enactment	Public Law No.	U.S. Statute No.	U.S. Bill	U.S. President
July 18, 1914	P.L. 63-143	38 Stat. 514	H.R. 5304	Woodrow Wilson
June 24, 1926	P.L. 69-422	44 Stat. 764	H.R. 9690	Calvin Coolidge
February 23, 1927	P.L. 69-629	44 Stat. 1105	S. 5622	Calvin Coolidge
May 11, 1928	P.L. 70-366	45 Stat. 498	H.R. 5465	Calvin Coolidge
February 16, 1929	Pub. Res. 70-87	45 Stat. 1222	H.J.Res. 153	Calvin Coolidge
March 2, 1929	P.L. 70-994	45 Stat. 1530	H.R. 16539	Calvin Coolidge

== See also ==
1917 in aviation	Gordon Bennett Cup
1930 Graf Zeppelin stamps	Helium Act of 1925
Aero Club of America	History of aviation
Airship hangar	List of aerospace museums
Aviation Service Act	National Defense Act of 1916
Balloon buster	Observation balloon
Balloon Pilot Badge	Observer Badge
Dirigible Pilot Badge	Strategic bombing during World War I
German bombing of Britain, 1914–1918	Timeline of US Navy airship units (pre-WWII)

Historic Airship Hangars in United States

Goodyear Airdock	Marine Corps Air Station Tustin
Hangar One (Mountain View, California)	Naval Air Station Tillamook
Henry Post Army Airfield	Scott Field Historic District
Lakehurst Hangar No. 1	Weeksville Dirigible Hangar

Lighter-Than-Air Aircraft of United States

Aerostat	R38-class airship
Alclad	U.S. Army airships
E-class blimp	U.S. Navy airships
Metal-clad airship	ZMC-2

== Historical bibliography ==
- Baldwin, Thomas (1786). "Airopaidia: Narrative of a Balloon Excursion". Internet Archive. Chester, G.B.: J. Fletcher Publisher. OCLC 3759036.
- Hearne, R.P.; Maxim, Sir Hiram Stevans (1910). "Airships in Peace & War". Internet Archive. John Lane Company. OCLC 68833818.
- Talbot, Frederick A. (1915). "Aëroplanes and Dirigibles of War". Internet Archive. W. Heinemann. OCLC 41419082.
- Talbot, Frederick A. (1915). "Aeroplanes and Dirigibles of War". Internet Archive. LibriVox.
- Royal Flying Corps (1916). "Silhouettes of Aeroplanes and Airships". Internet Archive. Harrison & Sons. OCLC 506014009.
- Orcy, Ladislas d' (1917). "D'Orcy's Airship Manual". Internet Archive. New York: The Century Co.
- Navy Relief Society (1936). "Airships Souvenir Booklet Summer 1936". Internet Archive. George F. O'Connell Printing Company. OCLC 44071962.
- Office of Air Force History (1978). "The U.S. Air Service in World War I: Volume I". Internet Archive. U.S. Air Force. OCLC 1975157.
- Office of Air Force History (1978). "The U.S. Air Service in World War I: Volume II". Internet Archive. U.S. Air Force. OCLC 1975157.
- Office of Air Force History (1978). "The U.S. Air Service in World War I: Volume III". Internet Archive. U.S. Air Force. OCLC 1975157.
- Office of Air Force History (1978). "The U.S. Air Service in World War I: Volume IV". Internet Archive. U.S. Air Force. OCLC 1975157.

== Historical video archives ==
Early 20th Century Global Flight by Airship

"Another Columbus Sails West" [Graf Zeppelin Trans-Atlantic Flight 27742]. Internet Archive. William J. Ganz Company. October 1928.
"1929 Graf Zeppelin Dirigibile Flight Around the World William Randolph Hearst XD10334". Periscope Film. William H. Ganz Company. August 1929.
Around the World by Zeppelin (1929) on YouTube
Graf Zeppelin Returns to New York After World Tour (1929) on YouTube
First All Metal Airship (1929) on YouTube
Early Balloons: History Of Flight (1972) on YouTube
"Dirigible Hindenburg Visits NAS Lakehurst, New Jersey, Circa 1932". Internet Archive. United States Navy. 1932.
"Lighter-Than-Air History Rigid Airship". Periscope Film. United States Department of War. 1937.
"L.T.A. History: Balloons" [U.S. Navy Training Film #MN2722A]. Internet Archive. U.S. Department of Defense. 1944.
"Montgolfier Brothers & Hot Air Balloon". Internet Archive. INTER/AKTION GmbH. 2015.
