= J. Twing Brooks =

American politician

Joshua Twing Brooks
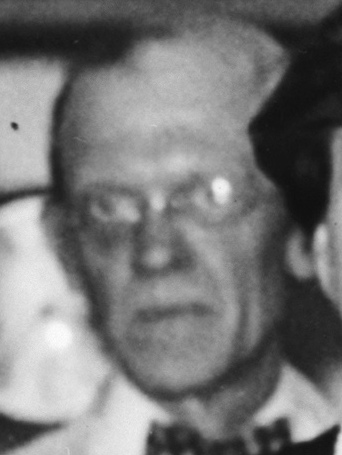

Member of the U.S. House of Representatives from Pennsylvania's 30th district
- In office March 4, 1933 – January 3, 1937
- Preceded by: William R. Coyle
- Succeeded by: Peter J. De Muth

Personal details
- Born: February 27, 1884 Edgeworth, Pennsylvania, U.S.
- Died: February 7, 1956 (aged 71)
- Party: Democratic

Joshua Twing Brooks (February 27, 1884 – February 7, 1956) was a Democratic member of the U.S. House of Representatives from Pennsylvania.

== Biography ==
Brooks was born in Edgeworth (now Sewickley), Pennsylvania. He graduated from the Sheffield Scientific School of Yale University in 1908.

He was engaged in the steel industry after graduation. During the First World War, Brooks served in the Quartermaster Division in Washington, D.C., purchasing steel products for the Army. After the war he returned to Sewickley, and continued in the steel industry. He later established his own business as a distributor of railway supplies and steel products.

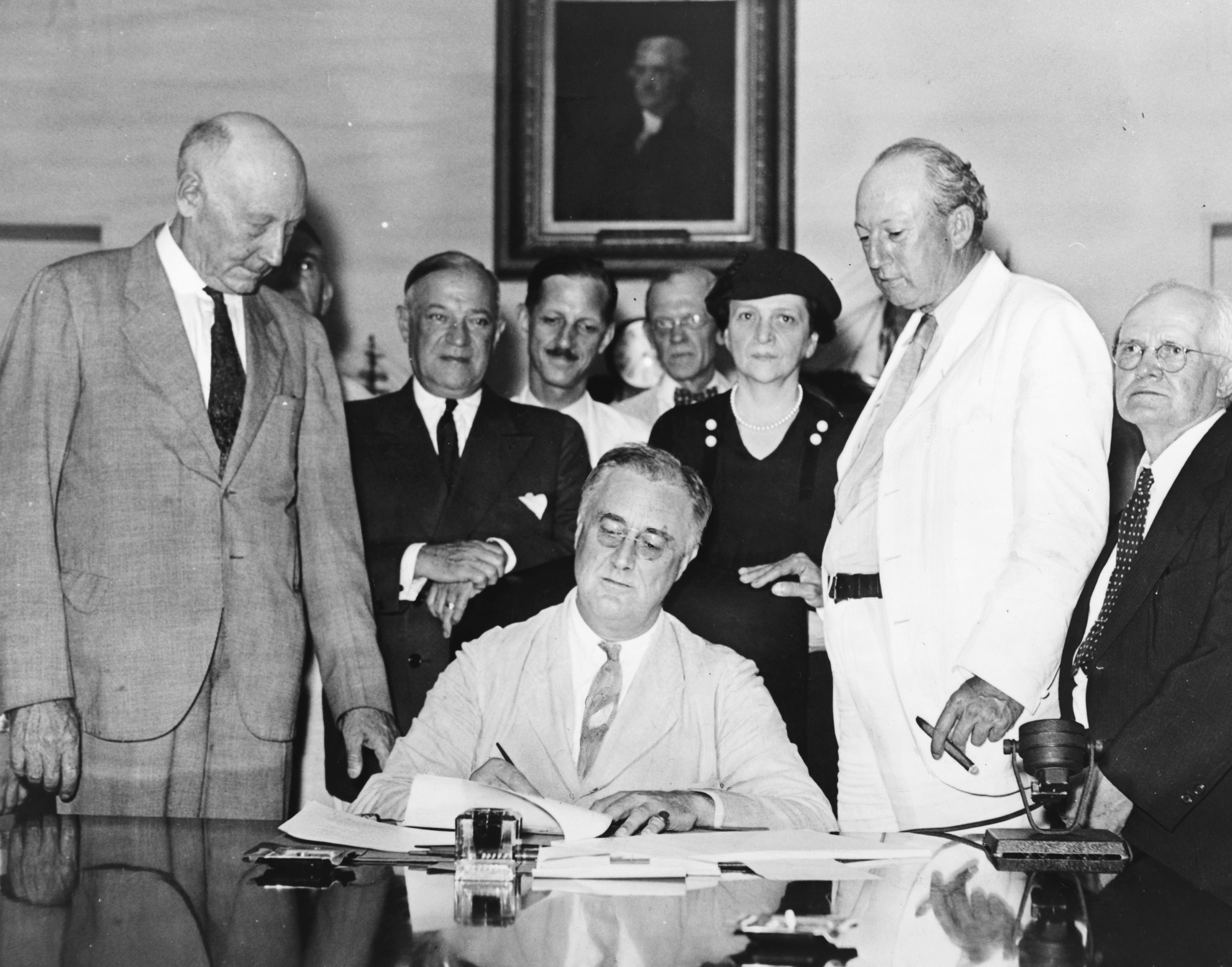
Signing Of The Social Security Act by Franklin Roosevelt in 1935 with Rep. Brooks in standing fourth from the left

Brooks was elected as a Democrat to the Seventy-third and Seventy-fourth Congresses. He was an unsuccessful candidate for renomination in 1936. After his time in Congress, he served as a member of the Pennsylvania Liquor Control Board at Harrisburg, Pennsylvania, from 1937 to 1939.

He served as assistant director of aviation for Allegheny County, Pennsylvania, from 1940 to 1948, and as manager of Allegheny County Airport from 1949 to 1956. He died in Sewickley, aged 71, and is buried in Sewickley Cemetery.

== Sources ==
- United States Congress. "Joshua Twing Brooks (id: B000882)". Biographical Directory of the United States Congress.
- The Political Graveyard

U.S. House of Representatives
Preceded by William R. Coyle	Member of the U.S. House of Representatives from Pennsylvania's 30th congressional district 1933–1937	Succeeded by Peter J. De Muth
