= Robert J. Corbett =

American educator and politician from Pennsylvania

Robert Corbett
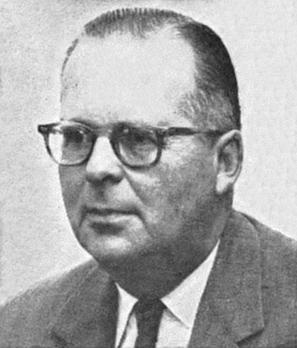

Member of the U.S. House of Representatives from Pennsylvania
- In office January 3, 1945 – April 25, 1971
- Preceded by: Samuel Weiss
- Succeeded by: John Heinz
- Constituency: 30th district (1945–1953); 29th district (1953–1963); 18th district (1963–1971)
- In office January 3, 1939 – January 3, 1941
- Preceded by: Peter De Muth
- Succeeded by: Thomas Scanlon
- Constituency: 30th district

Personal details
- Born: August 25, 1905 Avalon, Pennsylvania, U.S.
- Died: April 25, 1971 (aged 65) Pittsburgh, Pennsylvania, U.S.
- Party: Republican
- Relatives: William Corbett (brother)
- Education: Allegheny College, University of Pittsburgh
- Occupation: Teacher, Politician

Robert James Corbett (August 25, 1905 – April 25, 1971) was a Republican member of the U.S. House of Representatives from Pennsylvania.

== Biography ==
Robert Corbett was born in Avalon, Pennsylvania near Pittsburgh. He was the brother of the interim Governor of Guam William Corbett. He graduated from Allegheny College in Meadville, Pennsylvania in 1927 and from the University of Pittsburgh in 1929. He worked as senior high-school instructor at Coraopolis, Pennsylvania from 1929 to 1938, and as an instructor in the Pittsburgh Academy Evening School in 1938.

He was elected as a Republican to the 76th United States Congress in 1938, but was unsuccessful candidate for reelection in 1940. After his defeat he served on the staff of Senator James J. Davis in Pittsburgh. He was elected Sheriff of Allegheny County (Pittsburgh) and served from 1942 to 1944. He was elected to the 79th United States Congress in 1944 and served from January 3, 1945, until his death from a heart attack in Pittsburgh, Pennsylvania on April 25, 1971. Corbett voted in favor of the Civil Rights Acts of 1957, 1960, 1964, and 1968, as well as the 24th Amendment to the U.S. Constitution and the Voting Rights Act of 1965. Corbett voted for several other progressive initiatives during his time in Congress such as those related to minimum wage rises, poverty alleviation, and health insurance.

== See also ==
- List of members of the United States Congress who died in office (1950–1999)

== Sources ==
- United States Congress. "Robert J. Corbett (id: C000772)". Biographical Directory of the United States Congress.

U.S. House of Representatives
Preceded by Peter De Muth	Member of the U.S. House of Representatives from Pennsylvania's 30th congressional district 1939–1941	Succeeded by Thomas Scanlon
Preceded by Samuel Weiss	Member of the U.S. House of Representatives from Pennsylvania's 30th congressional district 1945–1953	Succeeded by Vera Buchanan
Preceded by Harmar Denny	Member of the U.S. House of Representatives from Pennsylvania's 29th congressional district 1953–1963	Succeeded by District Eliminated
Preceded by Irving Walley	Member of the U.S. House of Representatives from Pennsylvania's 18th congressional district 1963–1971	Succeeded by John Heinz
