= Peter J. De Muth =

American politician

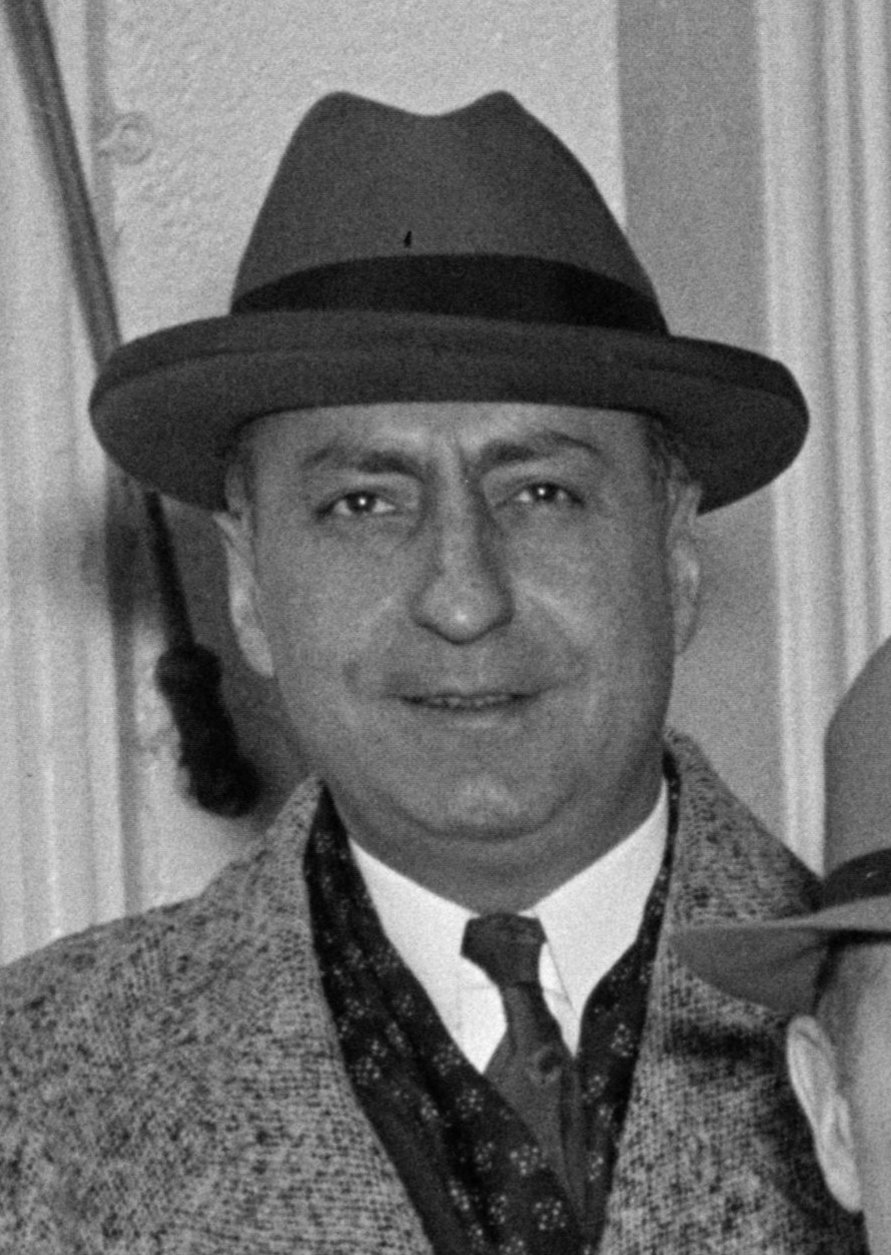
- De Muth in 1938

Member of the U.S. House of Representatives from Pennsylvania's 30th district
- In office January 3, 1937 – January 3, 1939
- Preceded by: J. Twing Brooks
- Succeeded by: Robert J. Corbett

Personal details
- Born: January 1, 1892 Pittsburgh, Pennsylvania, U.S.
- Died: April 3, 1993 (aged 101) Laguna Hills, California, U.S.
- Party: Democratic

Peter Joseph De Muth (January 1, 1892 – April 3, 1993) was an American businessman and politician who served one term as a Democratic member of the U.S. House of Representatives from Pennsylvania.

== Biography ==
Peter J. De Muth was born in Pittsburgh, Pennsylvania on January 1, 1892. He received a B.S. from the Carnegie Institute of Technology in Pittsburgh, and worked as a civil engineer from 1914 until his enlistment in the United States Navy as a chief machinist mate on July 15, 1918. He returned to Pittsburgh and was employed as a sales manager from 1919 to 1922. He was engaged in the real estate business and as a building contractor in 1922.

=== Congress ===
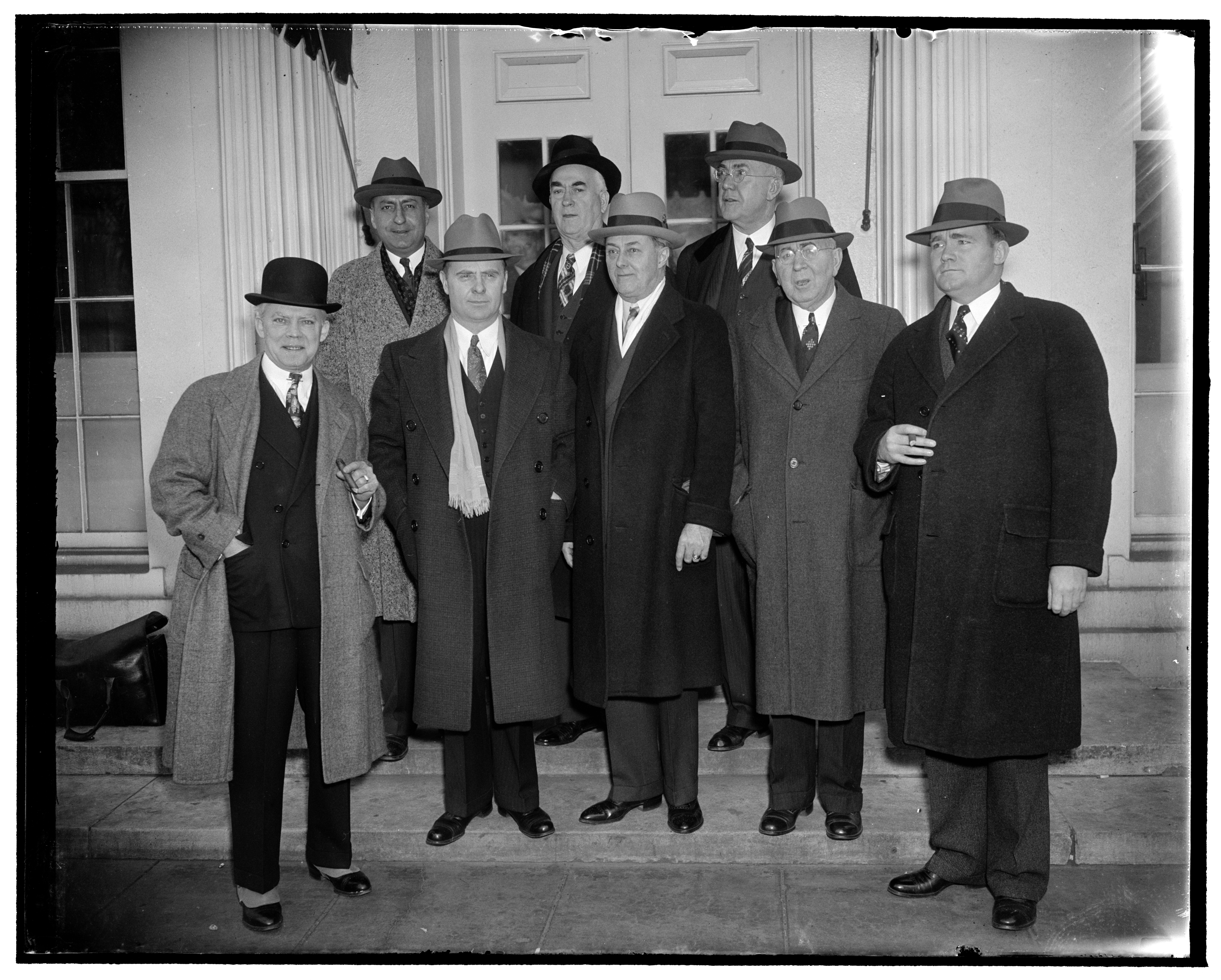
Group of legislators leaves White House after asking Franklin D. Roosevelt for $80,000,000 for flood control in Ohio Valley, March 7, 1938. front: l-r Joseph A. Dixon, James G. Polk, Eugene B. Crowe, G W Johnson, Lawrence E. Imhoff, rear l-r : Peter J. De Muth, Kent E. Keller, Brent Spence.

De Muth was elected as a Democrat to the Seventy-fifth Congress. He was an unsuccessful candidate for reelection in 1938.

=== Later career and death ===
He resumed the real estate and building business in Pittsburgh until June 1949, when he moved to Los Angeles, California. He continued to work in the real estate, insurance, and building business, and was a resident of Laguna Hills, California, until his death. He died on April 3, 1993, in Laguna Hills, California.

U.S. House of Representatives
Preceded by J. Twing Brooks	Member of the U.S. House of Representatives from Pennsylvania's 30th congressional district January 3, 1937 – January 3, 1939	Succeeded by Robert J. Corbett
Honorary titles
Preceded by Hamilton Fish III	Oldest living U.S. representative (Sitting or former); January 18, 1991 – April 3, 1993	Succeeded by Margaret Chase Smith
