= Thomas E. Scanlon =

American politician (1896–1955)

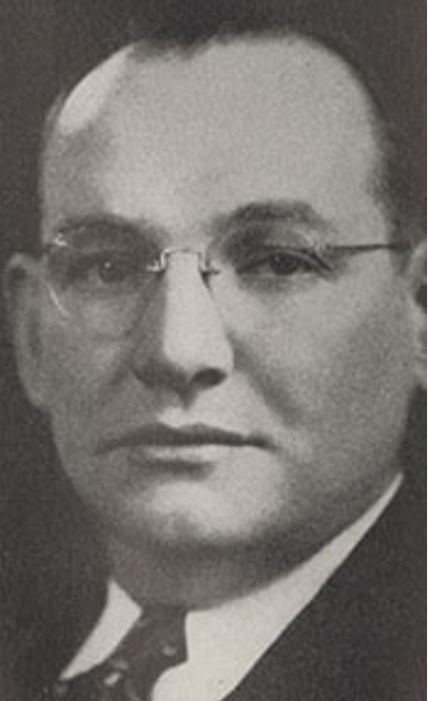
- Scanlon in 1945

Member of the U.S. House of Representatives from Pennsylvania
- In office January 3, 1941 – January 3, 1945
- Preceded by: Robert J. Corbett (30th); Robert F. Rich (16th)
- Succeeded by: Samuel A. Weiss (30th); Samuel K. McConnell Jr. (16th)
- Constituency: 30th district (1941-43); 16th district (1943-45)

Personal details
- Born: September 18, 1896 Pittsburgh, Pennsylvania, U.S.
- Died: August 9, 1955 (aged 58) Pittsburgh, Pennsylvania, U.S.
- Resting place: North Side Catholic Cemetery
- Party: Democratic

Thomas Edward Scanlon (September 18, 1896 – August 9, 1955) was an American World War I veteran who served as a Democratic member of the U.S. House of Representatives from Pennsylvania, serving one term in office from 1943 to 1945.

== Biography ==
Tom Scanlon was born in Pittsburgh, Pennsylvania. He attended the public schools, Forbes School, and Duquesne University in Pittsburgh, Pennsylvania. He learned the pressman's trade and was employed on Pittsburgh newspapers from 1914 to 1936.

=== World War I ===
During the First World War, he served as a private, first class, in the United States Army from September 6, 1918, to May 14, 1919.

=== Early political career ===
He was a delegate to the Pittsburgh Central Labor Union from 1920 to 1940, and a member of the Allegheny County Board for the Assessment and Revision of Taxes from 1936 to 1941.

=== Congress ===
Scanlon was elected as a Democrat to the 77th and 78th Congresses. He was an unsuccessful candidate for reelection in 1944.

=== Later career and death ===
After serving in congress, he was a member of the Boards of Viewers of Allegheny County, Pennsylvania.

He died in Pittsburgh, PA, and is interred in North Side Catholic Cemetery.

== Sources ==
- United States Congress. "Thomas E. Scanlon (id: S000105)". Biographical Directory of the United States Congress.

U.S. House of Representatives
Preceded by Robert J. Corbett	Member of the U.S. House of Representatives from Pennsylvania's 30th congressional district 1941–1943	Succeeded by Samuel A. Weiss
Preceded by Robert F. Rich	Member of the U.S. House of Representatives from Pennsylvania's 16th congressional district 1943–1945	Succeeded by Samuel K. McConnell Jr.
