= William H. Coleman =

American politician

William Henry Coleman
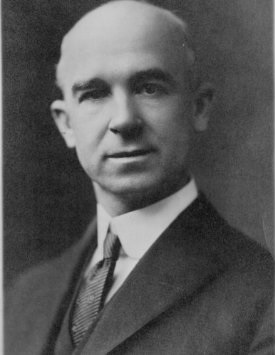
- William Henry Coleman in 1910.

Member of the U.S. House of Representatives from Pennsylvania's 30th district
- In office March 4, 1915 – March 3, 1917
- Preceded by: M. Clyde Kelly
- Succeeded by: M. Clyde Kelly

Personal details
- Born: December 28, 1871 North Versailles Township, Pennsylvania
- Died: June 3, 1943 (aged 71)
- Party: Republican

William Henry Coleman (December 28, 1871 – June 3, 1943) was a Republican member of the U.S. House of Representatives from Pennsylvania.

== Biography ==
William H. Coleman was born in North Versailles Township, Pennsylvania. He graduated from the law department of Columbian University (now George Washington University Law School). He served as mayor of McKeesport, Pennsylvania, from 1906 to 1909, and as clerk of courts for Allegheny County, Pennsylvania, from 1909 to 1915. He became a delegate to the Republican National Convention in 1912. He was admitted to the bar in 1913, and commenced practice in Pittsburgh, Pennsylvania.

Coleman was elected as a Republican to the Sixty-fourth Congress. He was an unsuccessful candidate for reelection in 1916. He resumed the practice of his profession, and died in McKeesport in 1943. Interment in Richland Cemetery in Dravosburg, Pennsylvania.

== Sources ==
- United States Congress. "William H. Coleman (id: C000622)". Biographical Directory of the United States Congress.
- The Political Graveyard

U.S. House of Representatives
Preceded by M. Clyde Kelly	Member of the U.S. House of Representatives from Pennsylvania's 30th congressional district 1915–1917	Succeeded by M. Clyde Kelly
