= John Dalzell =

American politician (1845–1927)

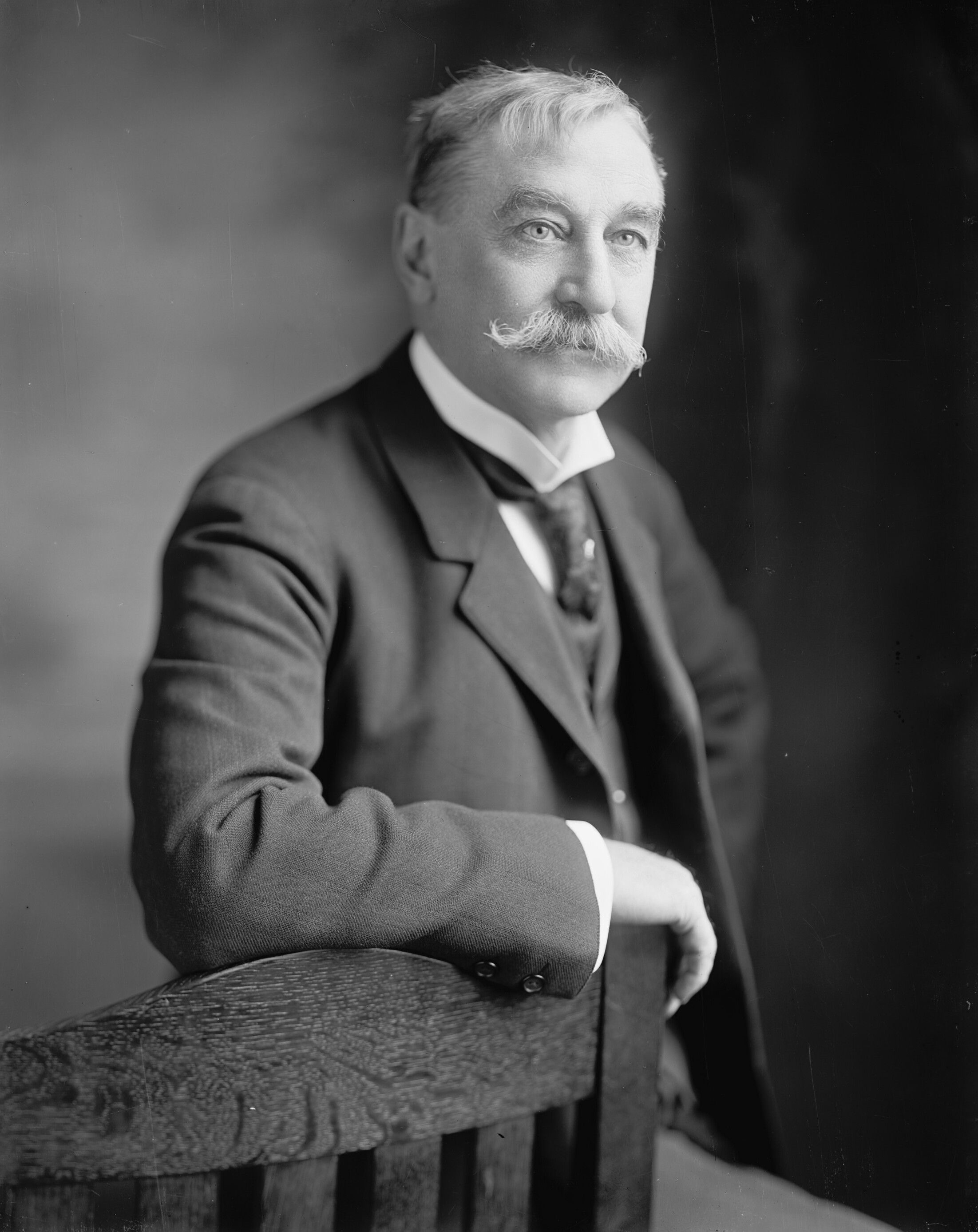

Dean of the United States House of Representatives
- In office March 22, 1912 – March 3, 1913
- Preceded by: Henry H. Bingham
- Succeeded by: Sereno E. Payne

Chairman of the House Rules Committee
- In office March 1910 – March 4, 1911
- Speaker: Joseph G. Cannon
- Preceded by: Joseph G. Cannon
- Succeeded by: Robert Lee Henry

Member of the U.S. House of Representatives from Pennsylvania
- In office March 4, 1887 – March 3, 1913
- Preceded by: James S. Negley
- Succeeded by: M. Clyde Kelly
- Constituency: 22nd district (1887-1903); 30th district (1903-1913)

Personal details
- Born: April 19, 1845 New York City, New York
- Died: October 2, 1927 (aged 82) Altadena, California
- Party: Republican
- Education: Yale University

John Dalzell (April 19, 1845 – October 2, 1927) was an American attorney and Republican politician who represented his hometown of Pittsburgh, Pennsylvania in the U.S. House of Representatives from 1887 to 1913. During the presidency of Theodore Roosevelt, Dalzell acted as an envoy between Roosevelt and Congress, bridging an otherwise combative relationship. He was a constant critic of machine politics, challenging both Matthew Quay and Joseph Gurney Cannon within his party.

== Biography ==
John Dalzell was born in New York City. He moved with his parents, Samuel Dalzell and Mary McDonnell Dalzell to Pittsburgh, Pennsylvania in 1847.

He attended the common schools and the Western University of Pennsylvania in Pittsburgh. He graduated from Yale College, where he was a member of Scroll and Key, with the class of 1865. He studied law, was admitted to the bar in 1867 and commenced practice in Pittsburgh.

Dalzell was elected as a Republican to the Fiftieth Congress in 1886 and to the twelve succeeding Congresses. He served as chairman of the United States House Committee on Pacific Railroads during the Fifty-first Congress, and the United States House Committee on Rules during the Sixty-first Congress. Dalzell was also a member of the House Committee on Ways and Means from 1891 to 1913.

He ran for the U.S. Senate in 1898 and 1900 but was defeated both times by Matthew S. Quay.

In 1902 he lost his bid for the Speakership of the House of Representatives to Joseph G. Cannon.

Dalzell was a delegate to the Republican National Conventions in 1904 and 1908, and served as a Regent of the Smithsonian Institution from 1906 to 1913. He was one of 14 representatives, all Republicans, to oppose the Sixteenth Amendment to the United States Constitution, which imposed a federal income tax. After the death of Pennsylvania representative Henry H. Bingham in March 1912, Dalzell became the longest continuously-serving member of the House of Representatives, or the "Father of the House." He was defeated for renomination later in 1912 and left Congress in March 1913.

As cited in "The Congressional Career of John Dalzell with Special Emphasis Upon His Tariff Views" by Kathryn E. Beazell, A.B.," John Dalzell worked closely with President Theodore Roosevelt. "It was said that because of President Roosevelt's outspoken manner, scores of Congressmen stayed away from the White House. But during the seven years that Mr. Roosevelt occupied the White House, he had no more frequent or welcome visitor than Mr. Dalzell. Oftentimes, when someone wanted favor from Mr. Roosevelt, Mr. Dalzell was asked to intercede. It was also said that with Presidents Harrison and McKinley, Mr. Dalzell was in close and constant touch, and that many of their ideas were brought before the House by Mr. Dalzell." At one point, President Theodore Roosevelt was asked about one particular matter, and responded: "Is Mr. Dalzell in favor of this improvement?" "He is, Mr. President," replied the spokesman. "Gentlemen," said the President, "I'll say this to you. I would do more for John Dalzell than I would for any other man on the floor of the House."

== Personal life ==
He married Mary Louise Duff, September 26, 1867. She was the daughter of Peter Duff (February 16, 1802 – September 13, 1869), the founder of Duff's Business Institute in Pittsburgh, (now Everest Institute).

John and Mary Dalzell had five children: William Sage Dalzell (August 17, 1868 – September 27, 1934), Elizabeth Marter Dalzell (March 4, 1870 – 1961), Samuel Dalzell (April 22, 1873 – 1958), John Dalzell Jr (August 1, 1875 – May 6, 1877) and Robert Duff Dalzell (August 27, 1882 – November 30, 1967).

In 1892 Albert Bibb built a house for him in Washington DC at 1605 New Hampshire Ave.

Elizabeth Marter Dalzell married Col. George M. Dunn, one of Teddy Roosevelt's Rough Riders.

During John Dalzell's political career, his wife Mary Louise was a prominent hostess active in the Washington political scene. Although women did not have the vote at that time, still she was politically influential. To briefly quote a passage describing this from vol 2, p 25 of Kitzmiller's The Family Encyclopedia:

"... his friends persuaded him, somewhat against his will, to go to Congress. In this project they were aided and abetted by his wife .... (who) was exceptionally well-fitted to be the helpmate of a congressman. Relieving her husband of many of the burdens which constituents place upon the representative, she also unobtrusively engineered campaign contracts, quietly supervising that meticulous reelection detail which is the bane of a congressman's existence.... The death of Mrs Dalzell in 1909 broke the mainspring of his political existence."

He retired in Washington, D.C., following the death of his wife in 1909. In 1925, he moved to live in the home of his youngest son, Samuel Dalzell, in Altadena, California. He died in California at the age of 82. He is buried in Pittsburgh's Allegheny Cemetery.

U.S. House of Representatives
Preceded by James S. Negley	Member of the U.S. House of Representatives from Pennsylvania's 22nd congressional district 1887–1903	Succeeded by George F. Huff
Preceded by Robert H. Foerderer	Member of the U.S. House of Representatives from Pennsylvania's 30th congressional district 1903–1913	Succeeded by M. Clyde Kelly
