= List of United States senators in the 70th Congress =

This is a complete list of United States senators during the 70th United States Congress listed by seniority from March 4, 1927, to March 3, 1929.

Order of service is based on the commencement of the senator's first term. Behind this is former service as a senator (only giving the senator seniority within their new incoming class), service as vice president, a House member, a cabinet secretary, or a governor of a state. The final factor is the population of the senator's state.

Senators who were sworn in during the middle of the Congress (up until the last senator who was not sworn in early after winning the November 1928 election) are listed at the end of the list with no number.

== Terms of service ==
Class	Terms of service of senators that expired in years
Class 1	Terms of service of senators that expired in 1929 (AZ, CA, CT, DE, FL, IN, MA, MD, ME, MI, MN, MO, MS, MT, ND, NE, NJ, NM, NV, NY, OH, PA, RI, TN, TX, UT, VA, VT, WA, WI, WV, and WY.)
Class 2	Terms of service of senators that expired in 1931 (AL, AR, CO, DE, GA, IA, ID, IL, KS, KY, LA, MA, ME, MI, MN, MS, MT, NC, NE, NH, NJ, NM, OK, OR, RI, SC, SD, TN, TX, VA, WV, and WY.)
Class 3	Terms of service of senators that expired in 1933 (AL, AR, AZ, CA, CO, CT, FL, GA, ID, IL, IN, IA, KS, KY, LA, MD, MO, NC, ND, NH, NV, NY, OH, OK, OR, PA, SC, SD, UT, VT, WA, and WI.)

== U.S. Senate seniority list ==
U.S. Senate seniority
Rank	Senator (party-state)	Seniority date	Other factors
1	Francis E. Warren (R-WY)	March 4, 1895	
2	Furnifold M. Simmons (D-NC)	March 4, 1901	
3	Lee S. Overman (D-NC)	March 4, 1903	North Carolina 15th in population (1900)
4	Reed Smoot (R-UT)	March 4, 1903	Utah 41st in population (1900)
5	William Borah (R-ID)	March 4, 1907	
6	Wesley Jones (R-WA)	March 4, 1909	Former representative
7	Ellison D. Smith (D-SC)	March 4, 1909	South Carolina 24th in population (1900)
8	Duncan U. Fletcher (D-FL)	March 4, 1909	Florida 33rd in population (1900)
9	Claude A. Swanson (D-VA)	August 1, 1910	
10	George P. McLean (R-CT)	March 4, 1911	Former governor
11	James A. Reed (D-MO)	March 4, 1911	
12	Henry F. Ashurst (D-AZ)	April 2, 1912	
13	Key Pittman (D-NV)	January 29, 1913	
14	Morris Sheppard (D-TX)	February 3, 1913	
15	Joseph E. Ransdell (D-LA)	March 4, 1913	Former representative (14 years)
16	Joseph Robinson (R-AR)	March 4, 1913	Former representative (10 years), former governor
17	George W. Norris (R-NE)	March 4, 1913	Former representative (10 years)
18	Thomas J. Walsh (D-MT)	March 4, 1913	
19	Charles Curtis (R-KS)	March 4, 1915	
20	James Watson (R-IN)	November 8, 1916	
21	Kenneth McKellar (D-TN)	March 4, 1917	Former representative (6 years)
22	William H. King (D-UT)	March 4, 1917	Former representative (3 years)
23	Peter G. Gerry (D-RI)	March 4, 1917	Former representative (2 years)
24	Park Trammell (D-FL)	March 4, 1917	Former governor, Florida 33rd in population (1910)
25	John B. Kendrick (D-WY)	March 4, 1917	Former governor, Wyoming 47th in population (1910)
26	Frederick Hale (R-ME)	March 4, 1917	Maine 34th in population (1910)
27	Andrieus Jones (D-NM)	March 4, 1917	New Mexico 43rd in population (1910)
28	Hiram Johnson (R-CA)	March 16, 1917	
29	George H. Moses (R-NH)	November 6, 1918	
30	Charles L. McNary (R-OR)	December 18, 1918	
31	Arthur Capper (R-KS)	March 4, 1919	Former governor, Kansas 22nd in population (1910)
32	Henry W. Keyes (R-NH)	March 4, 1919	Former governor, New Hampshire 39th in population (1910)
33	William J. Harris (D-GA)	March 4, 1919	Georgia 10th in population (1910)
34	Lawrence C. Phipps (R-CO)	March 4, 1919	Colorado 32nd in population (1910)
35	Pat Harrison (D-MS)	March 5, 1919	
36	Walter E. Edge (R-NJ)	May 19, 1919	
37	Carter Glass (D-VA)	February 2, 1920	
38	James Thomas Heflin (D-AL)	November 2, 1920	
39	Frank B. Willis (R-OH)	January 14, 1921	
40	Frank R. Gooding (R-ID)	January 15, 1921	
41	Thaddeus H. Caraway (D-AR)	March 4, 1921	Former representative
42	Peter Norbeck (R-SD)	March 4, 1921	Former governor, South Dakota 37th in population (1920)
43	Samuel M. Shortridge (R-CA)	March 4, 1921	California 8th in population (1920)
44	Edwin S. Broussard (D-LA)	March 4, 1921	Louisiana 22nd in population (1920)
45	Tasker Oddie (R-NV)	March 4, 1921	Nevada 48th in population (1920)
46	David A. Reed (R-PA)	August 8, 1922	
47	Thomas F. Bayard, Jr. (D-DE)	November 7, 1922	
48	Walter F. George (D-GA)	November 22, 1922	
49	James Couzens (R-MI)	November 29, 1922	
50	Frank L. Greene (R-VT)	March 4, 1923	Former representative (11 years)
51	Simeon Fess (R-OH)	March 4, 1923	Former representative (10 years), Ohio 4th in population (1920)
52	Hubert D. Stephens (D-MS)	March 4, 1923	Former representative (10 years), Mississippi 23rd in population (1920)
53	Matthew M. Neely (D-WV)	March 4, 1923	Former representative (8 years)
54	Clarence Dill (D-WA)	March 4, 1923	Former representative (4 years)
55	Woodbridge N. Ferris (D-MI)	March 4, 1923	Former governor, Michigan 7th in population (1920)
56	Edward I. Edwards (D-NJ)	March 4, 1923	Former governor, New Jersey 10th in population (1920)
57	Lynn Frazier (R-ND)	March 4, 1923	Former governor, North Dakota 36th in population (1920)
58	Royal S. Copeland (D-NY)	March 4, 1923	New York 1st in population (1920)
59	Earle B. Mayfield (D-TX)	March 4, 1923	Texas 5th in population (1920)
60	Henrik Shipstead (FL-MN)	March 4, 1923	Minnesota 17th in population (1920)
61	William C. Bruce (D-MD)	March 4, 1923	Maryland 28th in population (1920)
62	Robert B. Howell (R-NE)	March 4, 1923	Nebraska 31st in population (1920)
63	Burton K. Wheeler (D-MT)	March 4, 1923	Montana 39th in population (1920)
64	Porter H. Dale (R-VT)	November 7, 1923	
65	Jesse H. Metcalf (R-RI)	November 4, 1924	
66	Hiram Bingham (R-CT)	December 17, 1924	
67	Charles S. Deneen (R-IL)	February 26, 1925	
68	Coleman du Pont (R-DE)	March 4, 1925	Previously a senator
69	Frederick H. Gillett (R-MA)	March 4, 1925	Former representative (32 years)
70	Thomas D. Schall (R-MN)	March 4, 1925	Former representative (10 years)
71	Coleman L. Blease (R-SC)	March 4, 1925	Former governor, South Carolina 26th in population (1920)
72	William McMaster (R-SD)	March 4, 1925	Former governor, South Dakota 37th in population (1920)
73	Frederic Sackett (R-KY)	March 4, 1925	Kentucky 15th in population (1920)
74	Lawrence Tyson (R-TN)	March 4, 1925	Tennessee 19th in population (1920)
75	William B. Pine (R-OK)	March 4, 1925	Oklahoma 21st in population (1920)
76	Guy D. Goff (R-WV)	March 4, 1925	West Virginia 27th in population (1920)
77	Sam G. Bratton (D-NM)	March 4, 1925	New Mexico`43rd in population (1920)
78	Robert M. La Follette, Jr. (R-WI)	September 30, 1925	
79	Arthur Robinson (R-IN)	October 20, 1925	
80	Gerald Nye (R-ND)	November 14, 1925	
81	Daniel F. Steck (D-IA)	April 12, 1926	
82	Arthur R. Gould (R-ME)	November 30, 1926	
83	David I. Walsh (D-MA)	December 6, 1926	Previously a senator
84	Harry B. Hawes (D-MO)	December 6, 1926	
85	Smith W. Brookhart (R-IA)	March 4, 1927	Previously a senator
86	William S. Vare (R-PA)	March 4, 1927	Former representative (15 years), Pennsylvania 2nd in population (1920)
87	Carl Hayden (D-AZ)	March 4, 1927	Former representative (15 years), Arizona 45th in population (1920)
88	Alben W. Barkley (D-KY)	March 4, 1927	Former representative (14 years)
89	Elmer Thomas (D-OK)	March 4, 1927	Former representative (4 years), Oklahoma 21st in population (1920)
90	Millard Tydings (D-MD)	March 4, 1927	Former representative (4 years), Maryland 28th in population (1920)
91	John J. Blaine (R-WI)	March 4, 1927	Former governor
92	Robert F. Wagner (D-NY)	March 4, 1927	New York 1st in population (1920)
93	Hugo Black (D-AL)	March 4, 1927	Alabama 18th in population (1920)
94	Charles Waterman (R-CO)	March 4, 1927	Colorado 33rd in population (1920)
95	Frederick Steiwer (R-OR)	March 4, 1927	Oregon 34th in population (1920)
—	Bronson Cutting (R-NM)	December 29, 1927	
—	Arthur H. Vandenberg (R-MI)	March 31, 1928	
—	Cyrus Locher (D-OH)	April 28, 1928	
—	John Thomas (R-ID)	June 30, 1928	
96	Otis F. Glenn (R-IL)	December 3, 1928	
—	Octaviano Larrazolo (R-NM)	December 7, 1928	
—	Daniel Hastings (R-DE)	December 10, 1928	
—	Theodore E. Burton (R-OH)	December 15, 1928	

== See also ==
- 70th United States Congress
- List of United States representatives in the 70th Congress
