= William R. Coyle =

American politician

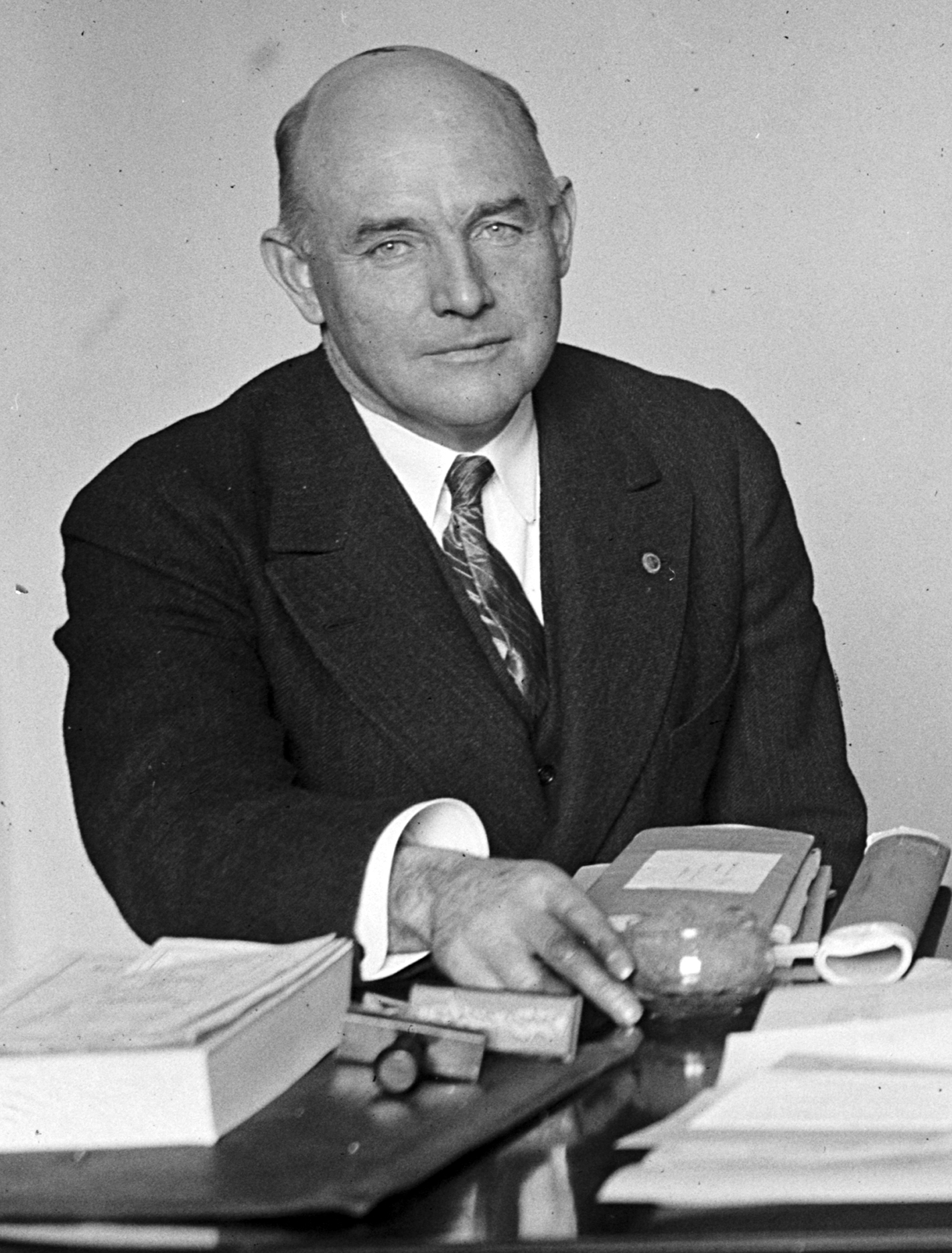

Member of the U.S. House of Representatives from Pennsylvania's 30th district
- In office March 4, 1929 – March 3, 1933
- Preceded by: Everett Kent
- Succeeded by: J. Twing Brooks
- In office March 4, 1925 – March 3, 1927
- Preceded by: Everett Kent
- Succeeded by: Everett Kent

Personal details
- Born: William Radford Coyle; July 10, 1878 Washington, D.C., U.S.
- Died: January 30, 1962 (aged 83)
- Resting place: Nisky Hill Cemetery
- Party: Republican

William Radford Coyle (July 10, 1878 – January 30, 1962) was a Republican member of the U.S. House of Representatives from Pennsylvania. He served three terms in office between 1925 and 1933.

== Early life ==
William R. Coyle was born in Washington, D.C. He attended Columbian College (now George Washington University) in Washington, D.C. in 1898 and 1899.

He was a field assistant in the United States Geological Survey from 1896 to 1899. He attended the Naval War College in Newport, Rhode Island in 1900.

=== Military service and education ===
He served in the United States Marine Corps, rising to the rank of captain, from 1900 to 1906.

He attended the law department of the University of Pennsylvania at Philadelphia, Pennsylvania in 1906 and 1907.

== Pennsylvania ==
He moved to Germantown, Pennsylvania in 1906 and to Bethlehem, Pennsylvania, in 1908. He was school director of Bethlehem from 1912 to 1918.

=== World War I ===
He served as captain of the Fourth Regiment, Pennsylvania National Guard, in 1913, and was commissioned first a captain, and then a major, in the United States Marine Corps in 1918. He was promoted to lieutenant colonel in 1932.

=== Business career ===
After the war, he served as president of the American Wholesale Coal Association in 1921 and 1922, and as a trustee to settle the affairs of the Tidewater Coal Exchange from 1922 to 1925.

=== Congress ===
Coyle was elected as a Republican to the Sixty-ninth Congress, but was an unsuccessful candidate for reelection in 1926. He was elected to the Seventy-first and Seventy-second Congresses, but was an unsuccessful candidate for reelection in 1932, 1936, and 1942.

He was a delegate to the Republican National Conventions in 1936 and 1944.

=== Later career ===
He served as chairman of civilian defense in Bethlehem from 1941 to 1945. He worked as vice president of Weston Dodson, from 1932 to 1954, and as chairman of Bethlehem Redevelopment Authority from 1953 to 1959.

== Death and burial ==
He died in Bethlehem, aged 83, and is buried in Nisky Hill Cemetery.

== See also ==
- List of United States representatives from Pennsylvania

U.S. House of Representatives
Preceded by Everett Kent	Member of the U.S. House of Representatives from Pennsylvania's 30th congressional district 1925–1927	Succeeded by Everett Kent
Preceded by Everett Kent	Member of the U.S. House of Representatives from Pennsylvania's 30th congressional district 1929–1933	Succeeded by J. Twing Brooks
