= Everett Kent =

American politician

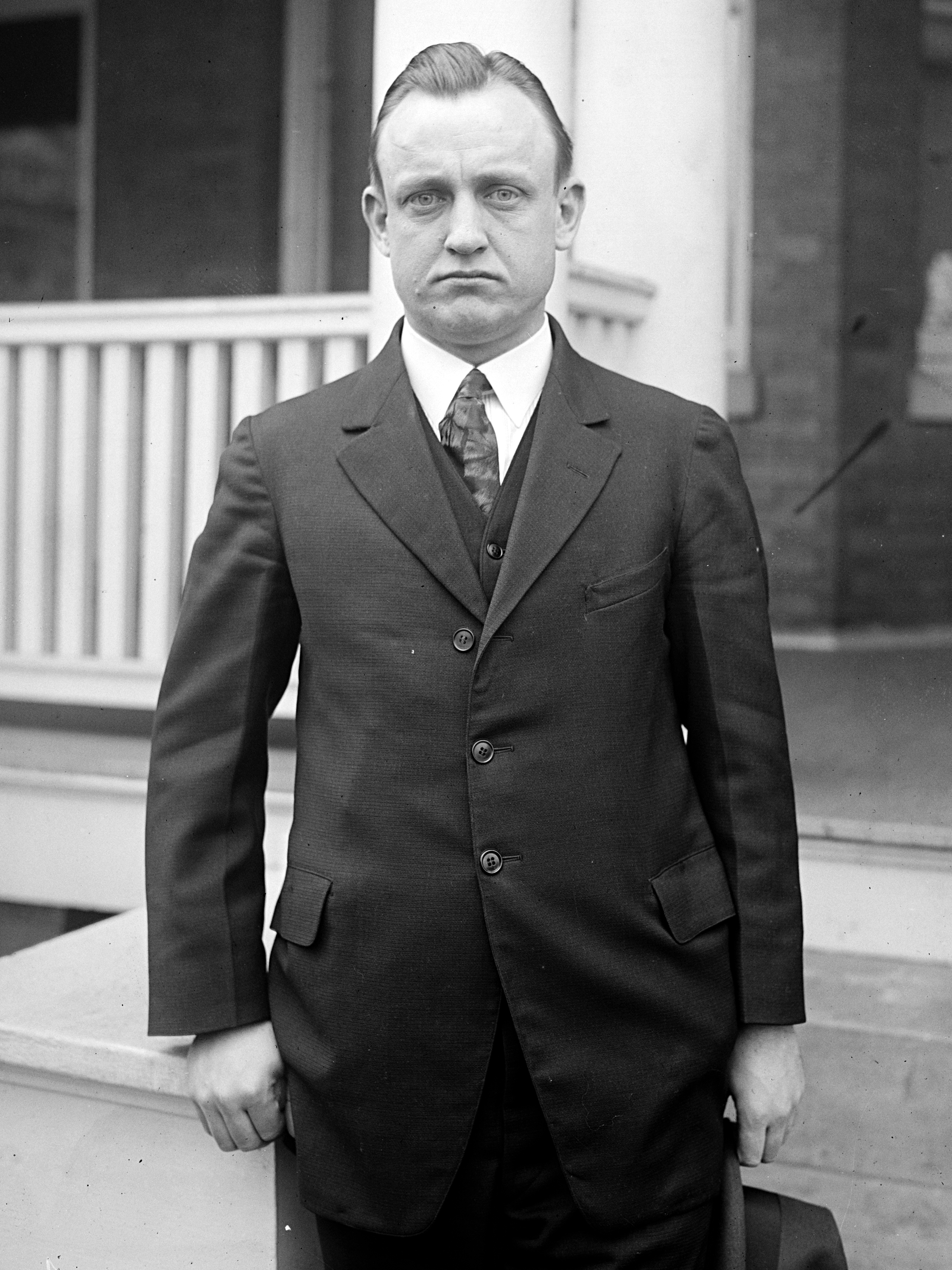
- Everett Kent

Member of the U.S. House of Representatives from Pennsylvania's 30th district
- In office March 4, 1927 – March 3, 1929
- Preceded by: William R. Coyle
- Succeeded by: William R. Coyle
- In office March 4, 1923 – March 3, 1925
- Preceded by: M. Clyde Kelly
- Succeeded by: William R. Coyle

Personal details
- Born: November 15, 1888 Bangor, Pennsylvania, U.S.
- Died: October 13, 1963 (aged 74) Bethlehem, Pennsylvania, U.S.
- Resting place: St. John's Cemetery in Bangor, Pennsylvania
- Party: Democratic
- Education: University of Pennsylvania

Everett Kent (November 15, 1888 – October 13, 1963) was an American lawyer and politician who served as a Democratic member of the U.S. House of Representatives from Pennsylvania. He served two nonconsecutive terms in Congress during the 1920s.

== Early life and career ==
Everett Kent was born in East Bangor, Pennsylvania in the Lehigh Valley region of the state. He attended the public schools in Lansford, East Bangor, Nazareth, and Bangor. He was engaged as a machinist and as a newspaper reporter, taught school, and worked as the principal of Roosevelt School in Bangor, Pennsylvania.

=== Legal and early political career ===
He graduated from the law department of the University of Pennsylvania in Philadelphia in 1911 and was admitted to the bar the same year. He commenced practice in Bangor and served as counsel for several municipalities and for the board of prison inspectors of Northampton County, Pennsylvania from 1912 to 1915. He served as the solicitor of Northampton County from 1920 to 1923.

== Congress and later political activities ==
Kent was elected as a Democrat to the Sixty-eighth Congress, but was an unsuccessful candidate for reelection in 1924. He was again elected to the Seventieth, but was an unsuccessful candidate for reelection in 1928. In the elections of 1924, 1926 and 1928, his opponent all three times was William R. Coyle.

He was a delegate to the Democratic National Conventions in 1936, 1940, 1944, 1948, 1952, and 1956. He served as solicitor for the county controller of Northampton County from 1933 to 1943.

== Later career and death ==
He resumed the practice of his profession in Bangor, and died in Bethlehem, Pennsylvania at age 74. He was interred in St. John's Cemetery in Bangor, Pennsylvania.

== Sources ==
- United States Congress. "Everett Kent (id: K000124)". Biographical Directory of the United States Congress.
- Everett Kent at The Political Graveyard

U.S. House of Representatives
Preceded by M. Clyde Kelly	Member of the U.S. House of Representatives from Pennsylvania's 30th congressional district 1923–1925	Succeeded by William R. Coyle
Preceded by William R. Coyle	Member of the U.S. House of Representatives from Pennsylvania's 30th congressional district 1927–1929	Succeeded by William R. Coyle
