= M. Clyde Kelly =

American politician (1883–1935)

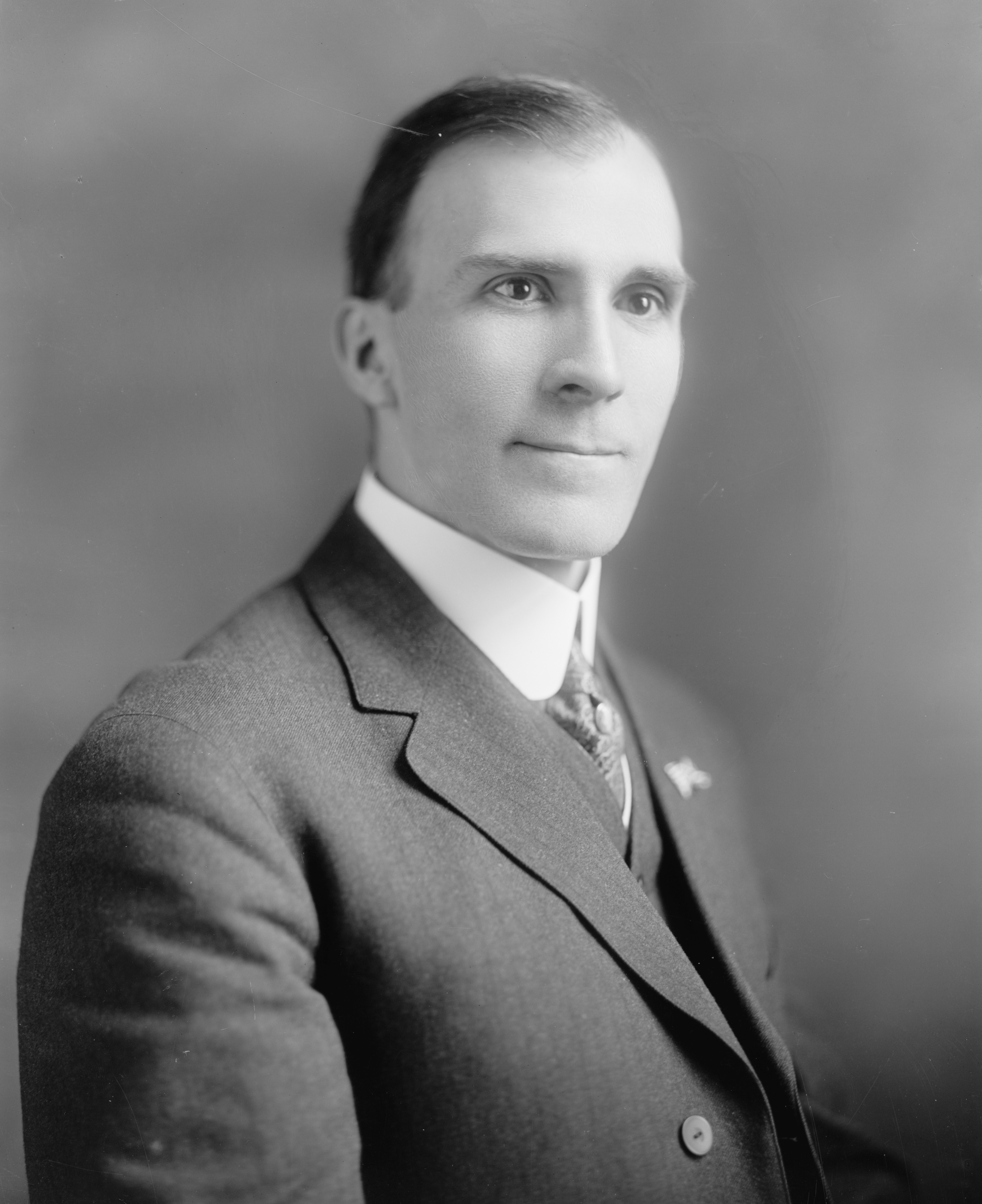

Member of the U.S. House of Representatives from Pennsylvania
- In office March 4, 1917 – January 3, 1935
- Preceded by: William Henry Coleman
- Succeeded by: James L. Quinn
- Constituency: 30th district (1917–1923); 33rd district (1923–1933); 31st district (1933–1935)
- In office March 4, 1913 – March 3, 1915
- Preceded by: John Dalzell
- Succeeded by: William Henry Coleman
- Constituency: 30th district

Member of the Pennsylvania House of Representatives
- In office 1910–1913

Personal details
- Born: August 4, 1883 Bloomfield, Ohio, U.S.
- Died: April 29, 1935 (aged 51) Punxsutawney, Pennsylvania, U.S.
- Resting place: Mahoning Union Cemetery
- Party: Republican; Progressive (1917–1919)
- Education: Muskingum College

Melville Clyde Kelly (August 4, 1883 – April 29, 1935) was an American politician and publisher who served as a Republican Party member of the U.S. House of Representatives from Pennsylvania.

== Biography ==
M. Clyde Kelly was born in Bloomfield, Muskingum County, Ohio. He attended Muskingum College in New Concord, Ohio. He was engaged in newspaper publishing at Braddock, Pennsylvania, in 1903 and established the Braddock Leader in 1904.

In 1907 he purchased the Daily News and the Evening Herald and consolidated them into the Daily News-Herald. He was a member of the Pennsylvania House of Representatives from 1910 to 1913.

Kelly was elected as a Republican to the Sixty-third Congress, but was an unsuccessful candidate in 1914. After his term in Congress, he continued his newspaper work. He was again elected as a Progressive to the Sixty-fifth and reelected as a Republican to the eight succeeding Congresses. He was an unsuccessful candidate for reelection in 1934.

During his tenure as Congressman, Clyde introduced a resolution to permit private contracting of airmail service. This resolution, the Air Mail Act of 1925 was signed into law on February 2, 1925, prompting many companies to venture into the aviation field (e.g., Boeing, Douglas, and Pratt & Whitney). The Airmail Act of 1925 was the foundation that commercial aviation is built upon.

After his time in Congress, he resumed his former business pursuits. He was accidentally shot while cleaning a rifle and died in a hospital at Punxsutawney, Pennsylvania. Clyde was interred in Mahoning Union Cemetery, near Marchand, Pennsylvania.

== Sources ==
- United States Congress. "M. Clyde Kelly (id: K000076)". Biographical Directory of the United States Congress.
- The Political Graveyard

U.S. House of Representatives
| Preceded by John Dalzell | Member of the U.S. House of Representatives from Pennsylvania's 30th congressional district March 4, 1913 – March 3, 1915 | Succeeded by William Henry Coleman |
| Preceded by William Henry Coleman | Member of the U.S. House of Representatives from Pennsylvania's 30th congressional district March 4, 1917 – March 3, 1923 | Succeeded by Everett Kent |
| Preceded by New district | Member of the U.S. House of Representatives from Pennsylvania's 33rd congressional district March 4, 1923 – March 3, 1933 | Succeeded by Henry Ellenbogen |
| Preceded by Adam Martin Wyant | Member of the U.S. House of Representatives from Pennsylvania's 31st congressional district March 4, 1933 – January 3, 1935 | Succeeded by James L. Quinn |
