= Timeline of US Navy airship units (pre-WWII) =

Unlike later blimp squadrons, which contained several airships, the large rigid airship units consisted of a single airship and, in the case of the USS Akron and USS Macon, a small contingent of fixed-wing aircraft.

== 1910s ==
=== 1919 ===
A semi rigid airship, the O-1, is purchased from Italy

October, The ZR-2 (R38) is placed under contract from Britain, where construction had been started on it as the R38.

== 1920s ==
=== 1921 ===
The first large US airship hangar is built at Lakehurst, New Jersey

On the fourth test flight of R-38 severe control inputs at low altitude and high speed cause the structural failure of the airship with the loss of the majority of the crew. Sixteen of the men killed were USN training to fly the ship back to Cape May, NJ. The ZR-2 (R38) crashed before the US Navy could take delivery of the airship; therefore ZR-2 did not officially receive its US designation, though it was painted with its planned Navy designation.

=== 1922 ===
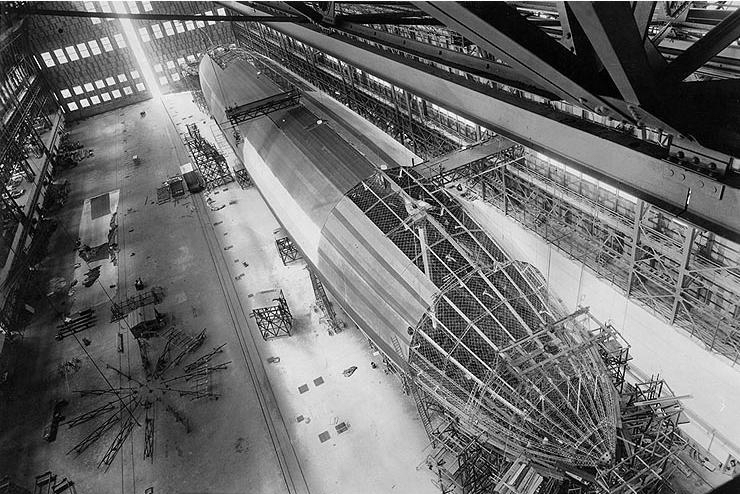
Construction of USS Shenandoah (ZR-1), 1923

The first American-built rigid airship, the USS Shenandoah, is built in Hangar No. 1 at Lakehurst, New Jersey.

=== 1923 ===
August 20, The USS Shenandoah, is christened.

September, USS Shenandoah is launched and flown from Lakehurst, New Jersey. It was the first ship to be inflated with the noble gas helium, which was so rare that the Shenandoah contained most of the world's reserves.

=== 1924 ===
The United States Navy purchases and takes delivery from Germany of the USS Los Angeles (ZR-3); the only German-built (as LZ 126) US Navy airship. The Los Angeles was paid for with "war reparations" money, owed according to the terms of the Treaty of Versailles, thus saving The Zeppelin Works. The success of the Los Angeles encouraged the US Navy to invest in its own, larger, airships. The Los Angeles flew successfully for 8 years.

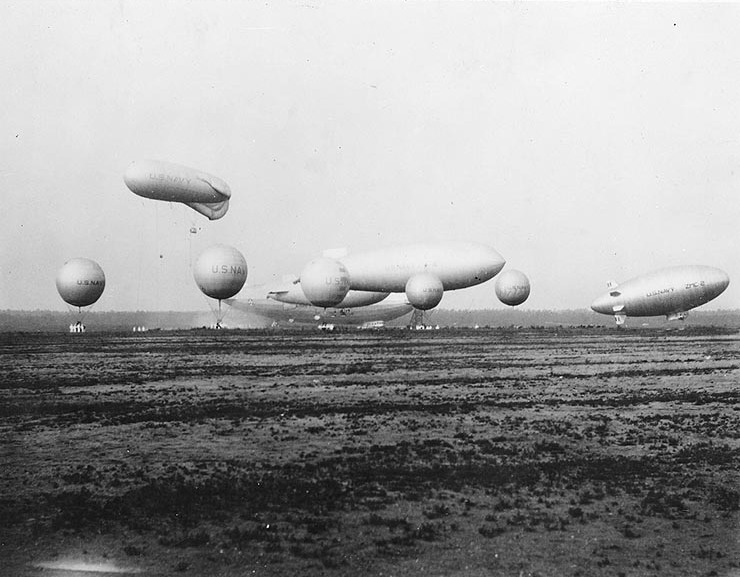
In the background, ZR-3, in front of it, (l to r) J-3 or 4, K-1, ZMC-2, in front of them, "Caquot" observation balloon, and in foreground free balloons used for training. US Navy airships and balloons, 1931

November 25, USS Los Angeles is commissioned in Lakehurst, NJ. The two airships USS Shenandoah and USS Los Angeles had to share the limited supply of helium, and thus alternated operating and overhauls.

The Los Angeles flew successfully for 8 years.

=== 1925 ===
September 3, USS Shenandoah was lost on a poorly planned publicity flight when it flew into a severe thunderstorm over Noble County, Ohio. It broke into pieces, killing 14 of its crew.

=== 1926 ===
June 24 (Washington, DC), The Navy department authorizes construction of two large dirigibles, named USS Akron (ZRS-4) and USS Macon (ZRS-5), to be the nucleus of the modern Air Force.

The US Navy developed the idea of using airships as airborne aircraft carriers, although the British had experimented with an airplane "trapeze" on their R33 . The USS Los Angeles was used to experiment with the project, followed by two other airships, the world's largest at the time, to test the principle—the USS Akron and Macon. Each carried four F9C Sparrowhawk fighters in its hangar, and could carry a fifth on the trapeze. The idea had mixed results. By the time the Navy started to develop a sound doctrine for using the ZRS-type airships, the last of the two built, USS Macon, was lost. The seaplane had become more mature, and was considered a better investment.

=== 1929 ===
A metalclad-airship, ZMC-2, is built by the Aircraft Development Corp (scrapped in 1941)

== 1930s ==
=== 1931 ===
The Empire State Building completed in 1931, was fitted with a dirigible mast, in anticipation of passenger airship service. Various entrepreneurs experimented with commuting and shipping freight via airship.

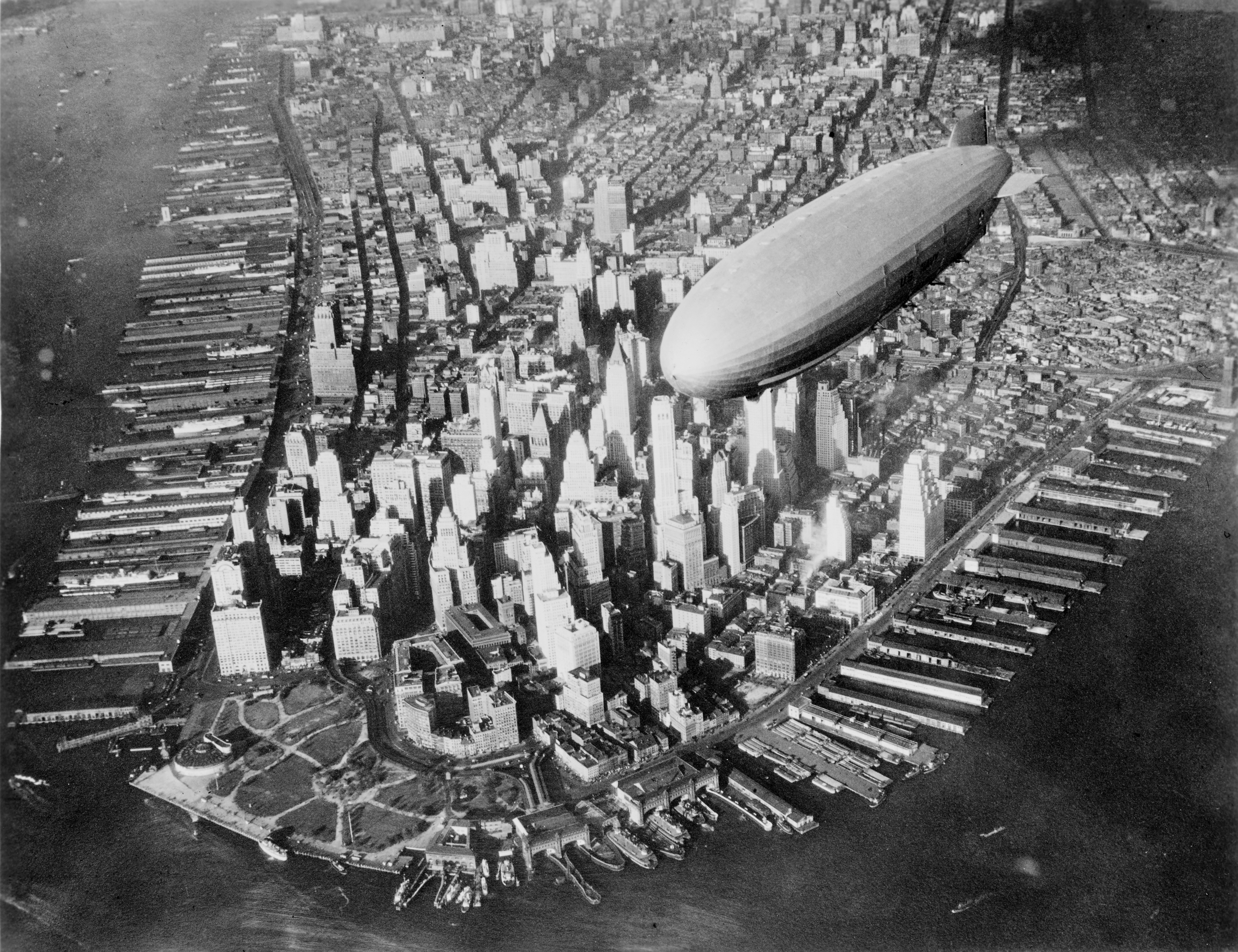
USS Akron over Lower Manhattan circa 1932

August 8, the USS Akron is launched.

=== 1932 ===
The (ZR-3) Los Angeles is decommissioned.

=== 1933 ===
April 3, USS Akron was caught in a severe storm and flown into the surface of the sea off the shore of New Jersey. It carried no life boats and few life vests, so 73 of its crew of 76 died from drowning or hypothermia.

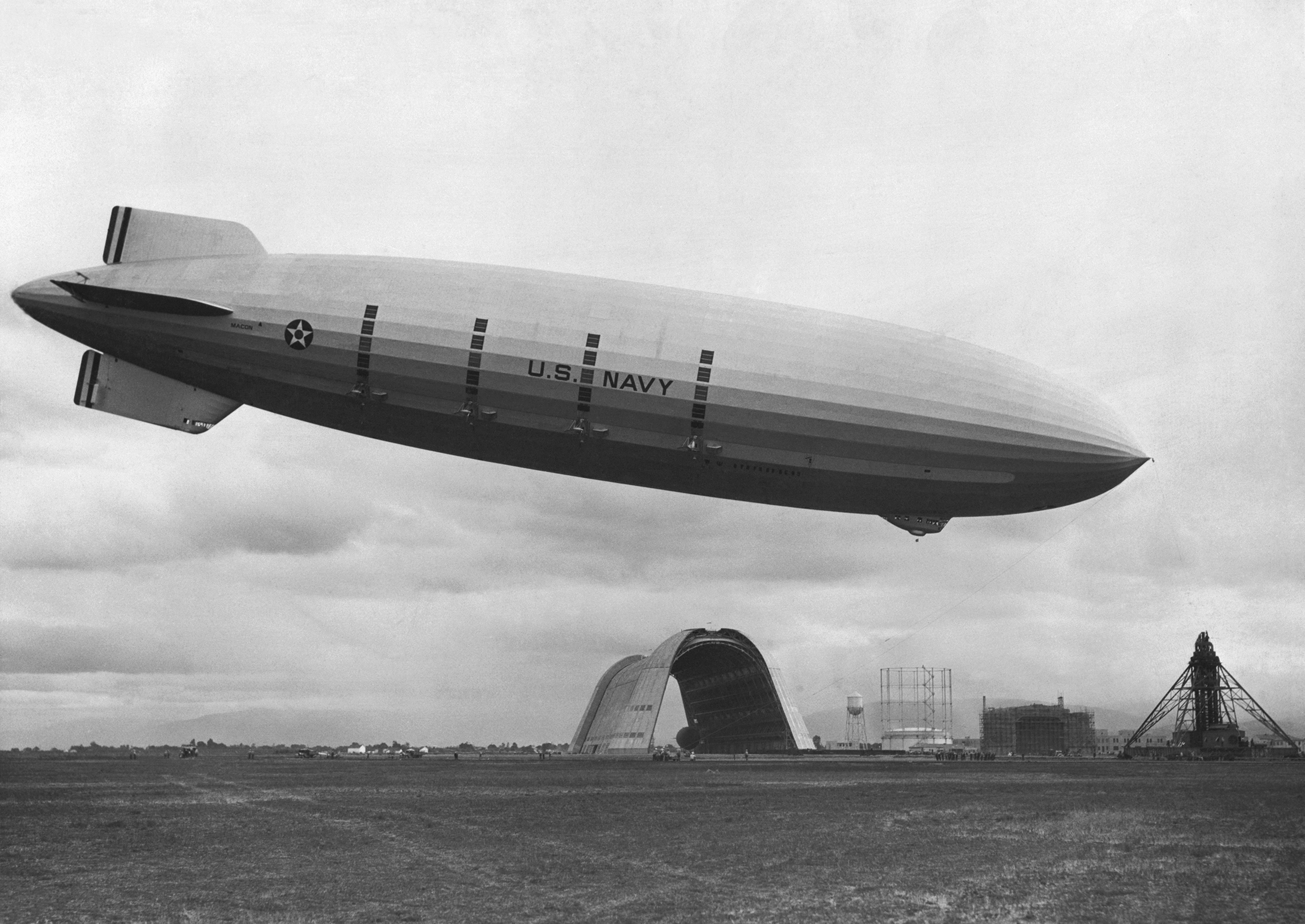
US Navy Zeppelin USS Macon (ZRS-5) over Moffett Field in 1933

April 21, the USS Macon is launched.

=== 1935 ===
February 12, USS Macon was lost after suffering a structural failure offshore near Point Sur Lighthouse. The failure caused a loss of gas, which was made much worse when the aircraft was driven over pressure height causing it to lose too much helium to maintain flight. Only 2 of its crew of 83 died in the crash thanks to the inclusion of life jackets and inflatable rafts after the Akron disaster.

=== 1940 ===
The (ZR-3) Los Angeles is dismantled.
