= Pennsylvania's 30th congressional district =

Former U.S. House district in Pennsylvania

Coordinates: 40°20′N 79°50′W

- Obsolete district
- Created: 1903
- Eliminated: 1960
- Years active: 1903–1963

Pennsylvania's 30th congressional district was one of Pennsylvania's districts of the United States House of Representatives.

== Geography ==
From 1903 to 1923 the district was located around Pittsburgh, Pennsylvania. From 1923 to 1933 the district was located around Bethlehem, Pennsylvania. From 1943 to 1955 the district was located west of Pittsburgh, Pennsylvania.

== History ==
This district was created in 1903. The district was eliminated in 1963.

== List of representatives ==
Representative	Party	Years	Cong ress	Electoral history
District established March 4, 1903
John Dalzell (Pittsburgh)	Republican	March 4, 1903 – March 3, 1913	58th 59th 60th 61st 62nd	Redistricted from the 22nd district and re-elected in 1902. Re-elected in 1904. Re-elected in 1906. Re-elected in 1908. Re-elected in 1910. Retired.
M. Clyde Kelly (Braddock)	Republican	March 4, 1913 – March 3, 1915	63rd	Elected in 1912. Lost re-election.
William H. Coleman (McKeesport)	Republican	March 4, 1915 – March 3, 1917	64th	Elected in 1914. Lost re-election.
M. Clyde Kelly (Edgewood)	Progressive	March 4, 1917 – March 3, 1923	65th 66th 67th	Elected in 1916. Re-elected in 1918; Re-elected in 1920. Redistricted to the 33rd district.
M. Clyde Kelly (Edgewood)	Republican	March 4, 1917 – March 3, 1923	65th 66th 67th	Elected in 1916. Re-elected in 1918; Re-elected in 1920. Redistricted to the 33rd district.
Everett Kent (Bangor)	Democrat	March 4, 1923 – March 3, 1925	68th	Elected in 1922. Lost re-election.
William R. Coyle (Bethlehem)	Republican	March 4, 1925 – March 3, 1927	69th	Elected in 1924. Lost re-election.
Everett Kent (Bangor)	Democrat	March 4, 1927 – March 3, 1929	70th	Elected in 1926. Lost re-election.
William R. Coyle (Bethlehem)	Republican	March 4, 1929 – March 3, 1933	71st 72nd	Elected in 1928. Re-elected in 1930. Lost re-election.
J. Twing Brooks (Sewickley)	Democrat	March 3, 1933 – January 3, 1937	73rd 74th	Elected in 1932. Re-elected in 1934. Lost renomination.
Peter J. De Muth (Pittsburgh)	Democrat	January 3, 1937 – January 3, 1939	75th	Elected in 1936. Lost renomination.
Robert J. Corbett (Bellevue)	Republican	January 3, 1939 – January 3, 1941	76th	Elected in 1938. Lost re-election.
Thomas E. Scanlon (Pittsburgh)	Democrat	January 3, 1941 – January 3, 1943	77th	Elected in 1940. Redistricted to the 16th district.
Samuel A. Weiss (Glassport)	Democrat	January 3, 1943 – January 3, 1945	78th	Redistricted from the 31st district and re-elected in 1942. Redistricted to the 33rd district.
Robert J. Corbett (Pittsburgh)	Republican	January 3, 1945 – January 3, 1953	79th 80th 81st 82nd	Elected in 1944. Re-elected in 1946. Re-elected in 1948. Re-elected in 1950. Redistricted to the 29th district
Vera Buchanan (McKeesport)	Democrat	January 3, 1953 – November 26, 1955	83rd 84th	Redistricted from the 33rd district and re-elected in 1952. Re-elected in 1954. Died.
Vacant		November 26, 1955 – January 24, 1956	84th	
Elmer J. Holland (Pittsburgh)	Democrat	January 24, 1956 – January 3, 1963	84th 85th 86th 87th	Elected to finish Buchanan's term. Re-elected in 1956. Re-elected in 1958. Re-elected in 1960. Redistricted to the 20th district.
District dissolved January 3, 1963
