= Aviation Service Act =

- Long title: An Act to increase the efficiency of the aviation service of the Army, and for other purposes.
- Nicknames: Aviation Service Act of 1914
- Enacted by: the 63rd United States Congress
- Effective: July 18, 1914

Citations
- Public law: Pub. L. 63–143
- Statutes at Large: 38 Stat. 514

Legislative history
- Introduced in the House as H.R. 5304; Signed into law by President Woodrow Wilson on July 18, 1914

The Aviation Service Act is a U.S. law passed in 1914. It created within the Signal Corps an Aviation Section to replace the Aeronautical Division. It directed the Aviation Section to operate and supervise "all military [U.S. Army] aircraft, including balloons and aeroplanes, all appliances pertaining to said craft, and signaling apparatus of any kind when installed on said craft." The section would also train "officers and enlisted men in matters pertaining to military aviation," and thus embraced all facets of the Army's air organization and operation. The old Aeronautical Division continued to exist, albeit as the Washington office of the new section.

== See also ==
- 1914 in aviation
- Aviation Act of 1917
