= List of United States representatives in the 87th Congress =

This is a complete list of United States representatives during the 87th United States Congress listed by seniority.

As an historical article, the districts and party affiliations listed reflect those during the 87th Congress (January 3, 1961 – January 3, 1963). Seats and party affiliations on similar lists for other congresses will be different for certain members.

Seniority depends on the date on which members were sworn into office. Since many members are sworn in on the same day, subsequent ranking is based on previous congressional service of the individual and then by alphabetical order by the last name of the representative.

Committee chairmanship in the House is often associated with seniority. However, party leadership is typically not associated with seniority.

Note: The "*" indicates that the representative/delegate may have served one or more non-consecutive terms while in the House of Representatives of the United States Congress.

== U.S. House seniority list ==
U.S. House seniority
Rank	Representative	Party	District	Seniority date (Previous service, if any)	No.# of term(s)	Notes
1	Sam Rayburn	D	TX-04	March 4, 1913	25th term	Dean and Speaker of the House; Died on November 16, 1961.
2	Carl Vinson	D	GA-06	November 3, 1914	25th term	Became Dean of the House after Rayburn died.
3	Clarence Cannon	D	MO-09	March 4, 1923	20th term	
4	Emanuel Celler	D	NY-11	March 4, 1923	20th term	
5	John Taber	R	NY-36	March 4, 1923	20th term	Left the House in 1963.
6	Joseph William Martin Jr.	R	MA-14	March 4, 1925	19th term	
7	John William McCormack	D	MA-12	November 6, 1928	18th term	Became Speaker of the House after Rayburn died.
8	Wright Patman	D	TX-01	March 4, 1929	17th term	
9	Howard W. Smith	D	VA-08	March 4, 1931	16th term	
10	Brent Spence	D	KY-05	March 4, 1931	16th term	Left the House in 1963.
11	William M. Colmer	D	MS-06	March 4, 1933	15th term	
12	Francis E. Walter	D	PA-15	March 4, 1933	15th term	
13	Harold D. Cooley	D	NC-04	July 7, 1934	15th term	
14	Leslie C. Arends	R	IL-17	January 3, 1935	14th term	
15	Charles A. Buckley	D	NY-24	January 3, 1935	14th term	
16	Clare Hoffman	R	MI-04	January 3, 1935	14th term	Left the House in 1963.
17	George H. Mahon	D	TX-19	January 3, 1935	14th term	
18	Charles A. Halleck	R	IN-02	January 29, 1935	14th term	
19	Frank W. Boykin	D	AL-01	July 30, 1935	14th term	Left the House in 1963.
20	Overton Brooks	D	LA-04	January 3, 1937	13th term	Died on September 16, 1961.
21	Eugene James Keogh	D	NY-09	January 3, 1937	13th term	
22	Michael J. Kirwan	D	OH-19	January 3, 1937	13th term	
23	Noah M. Mason	R	IL-15	January 3, 1937	13th term	Left the House in 1963.
24	William R. Poage	D	TX-11	January 3, 1937	13th term	
25	Harry R. Sheppard	D	CA-27	January 3, 1937	13th term	
26	Albert Thomas	D	TX-08	January 3, 1937	13th term	
27	George M. Grant	D	AL-02	June 14, 1938	13th term	
28	Herman Carl Andersen	R	MN-07	January 3, 1939	12th term	Left the House in 1963.
29	Clarence J. Brown	R	OH-07	January 3, 1939	12th term	
30	Robert B. Chiperfield	R	IL-19	January 3, 1939	12th term	Left the House in 1963.
31	Ezekiel C. Gathings	D	AR-01	January 3, 1939	12th term	
32	Ivor D. Fenton	R	PA-12	January 3, 1939	12th term	Left the House in 1963.
33	Ben F. Jensen	R	IA-07	January 3, 1939	12th term	
34	Paul J. Kilday	D	TX-20	January 3, 1939	12th term	Resigned on September 24, 1961.
35	John L. McMillan	D	SC-06	January 3, 1939	12th term	
36	Wilbur Mills	D	AR-02	January 3, 1939	12th term	
37	William F. Norrell	D	AR-06	January 3, 1939	12th term	Died on February 15, 1961.
38	Clarence E. Kilburn	R	NY-33	February 13, 1940	12th term	
39	Clifford Davis	D	TN-09	February 14, 1940	12th term	
40	Frances P. Bolton	R	OH-22	February 27, 1940	12th term	
41	Herbert Covington Bonner	D	NC-01	November 5, 1940	12th term	
42	Oren Harris	D	AR-04	January 3, 1941	11th term	
43	Felix Edward Hébert	D	LA-01	January 3, 1941	11th term	
44	L. Mendel Rivers	D	SC-01	January 3, 1941	11th term	
45	Jamie Whitten	D	MS-02	November 4, 1941	11th term	
46	Thomas J. Lane	D	MA-07	December 30, 1941	11th term	Left the House in 1963.
47	Cecil R. King	D	CA-17	August 25, 1942	11th term	
48	Thomas Abernethy	D	MS-01	January 3, 1943	10th term	
49	James C. Auchincloss	R	NJ-03	January 3, 1943	10th term	
50	William L. Dawson	D	IL-01	January 3, 1943	10th term	
51	Michael A. Feighan	D	OH-20	January 3, 1943	10th term	
52	O. C. Fisher	D	TX-21	January 3, 1943	10th term	
53	Leon H. Gavin	R	PA-23	January 3, 1943	10th term	
54	Charles B. Hoeven	R	IA-08	January 3, 1943	10th term	
55	Chester E. Holifield	D	CA-19	January 3, 1943	10th term	
56	Walt Horan	R	WA-05	January 3, 1943	10th term	
57	Walter Judd	R	MN-05	January 3, 1943	10th term	Left the House in 1963.
58	Ray Madden	D	IN-01	January 3, 1943	10th term	
59	Chester Earl Merrow	R	NH-01	January 3, 1943	10th term	Left the House in 1963.
60	James H. Morrison	D	LA-06	January 3, 1943	10th term	
61	Tom J. Murray	D	TN-07	January 3, 1943	10th term	
62	Thomas J. O'Brien	D	IL-06	January 3, 1943; Previous service, 1933–1939.	13th term*	
63	Alvin O'Konski	R	WI-10	January 3, 1943	10th term	
64	Philip J. Philbin	D	MA-03	January 3, 1943	10th term	
65	W. Arthur Winstead	D	MS-05	January 3, 1943	10th term	
66	George W. Andrews	D	AL-03	March 14, 1944	10th term	
67	John J. Rooney	D	NY-14	June 6, 1944	10th term	
68	John W. Byrnes	R	WI-08	January 3, 1945	9th term	
69	Frank Chelf	D	KY-04	January 3, 1945	9th term	
70	Robert J. Corbett	R	PA-29	January 3, 1945; Previous service, 1939–1941.	10th term*	
71	George Hyde Fallon	D	MD-04	January 3, 1945	9th term	
72	James G. Fulton	R	PA-27	January 3, 1945	9th term	
73	Gordon L. McDonough	R	CA-15	January 3, 1945	9th term	Left the House in 1963.
74	George Paul Miller	D	CA-08	January 3, 1945	9th term	
75	Thomas E. Morgan	D	PA-26	January 3, 1945	9th term	
76	Adam Clayton Powell Jr.	D	NY-16	January 3, 1945	9th term	
77	Charles Melvin Price	D	IL-24	January 3, 1945	9th term	
78	Albert Rains	D	AL-05	January 3, 1945	9th term	
79	Robert L. F. Sikes	D	FL-03	January 3, 1945; Previous service, 1941–1944.	11th term*	
80	James William Trimble	D	AR-03	January 3, 1945	9th term	
81	John E. Fogarty	D	RI-02	February 7, 1945; Previous service, 1941–1944	11th term*	
82	J. Vaughan Gary	D	VA-03	March 6, 1945	9th term	
83	A. Walter Norblad	R	OR-01	January 18, 1946	9th term	
84	Olin E. Teague	D	TX-06	August 24, 1946	9th term	
85	Burr Harrison	D	VA-07	November 5, 1946	9th term	Left the House in 1963.
86	Carl Albert	D	OK-03	January 3, 1947	8th term	
87	John B. Bennett	R	MI-12	January 3, 1947; Previous service, 1943–1945.	9th term*	
88	John Blatnik	D	MN-08	January 3, 1947	8th term	
89	Hale Boggs	D	LA-02	January 3, 1947; Previous service, 1941–1943.	9th term*	
90	Omar Burleson	D	TX-17	January 3, 1947	8th term	
91	Paul B. Dague	R	PA-09	January 3, 1947	8th term	
92	James C. Davis	D	GA-05	January 3, 1947	8th term	Left the House in 1963.
93	Harold Donohue	D	MA-04	January 3, 1947	8th term	
94	Joe L. Evins	D	TN-04	January 3, 1947	8th term	
95	Katharine St. George	R	NY-28	January 3, 1947	8th term	
96	Porter Hardy Jr.	D	VA-02	January 3, 1947	8th term	
97	Frank M. Karsten	D	MO-01	January 3, 1947	8th term	
98	Carroll D. Kearns	R	PA-24	January 3, 1947	8th term	Left the House in 1963.
99	Otto Passman	D	LA-05	January 3, 1947	8th term	
100	R. Walter Riehlman	R	NY-35	January 3, 1947	8th term	
101	Thor C. Tollefson	R	WA-06	January 3, 1947	8th term	
102	John Bell Williams	D	MS-04	January 3, 1947	8th term	
103	James E. Van Zandt	R	PA-20	January 3, 1947; Previous service, 1939–1943.	11th term*	Left the House in 1963.
104	Robert E. Jones Jr.	D	AL-08	January 28, 1947	8th term	
105	Edward Garmatz	D	MD-03	July 15, 1947	8th term	
106	Clark W. Thompson	D	TX-09	August 23, 1947; Previous service, 1933–1935.	9th term*	
107	William Moore McCulloch	R	OH-04	November 4, 1947	8th term	
108	Abraham J. Multer	D	NY-13	November 4, 1947	8th term	
109	Watkins Moorman Abbitt	D	VA-04	February 17, 1948	8th term	
110	Paul C. Jones	D	MO-10	November 2, 1948	8th term	
111	Hugh Joseph Addonizio	D	NJ-11	January 3, 1949	7th term	Resigned on June 30, 1962.
112	Wayne N. Aspinall	D	CO-04	January 3, 1949	7th term	
113	Cleveland M. Bailey	D	WV-03	January 3, 1949; Previous service, 1945–1947.	8th term*	Left the House in 1963.
114	William A. Barrett	D	PA-01	January 3, 1949; Previous service, 1945–1947.	8th term*	
115	Charles Edward Bennett	D	FL-02	January 3, 1949	7th term	
116	Richard Walker Bolling	D	MO-05	January 3, 1949	7th term	
117	James J. Delaney	D	NY-07	January 3, 1949; Previous service, 1945–1947.	8th term*	
118	Clyde Doyle	D	CA-23	January 3, 1949; Previous service, 1945–1947.	8th term*	
119	Carl Elliott	D	AL-07	January 3, 1949	7th term	
120	Gerald Ford	R	MI-05	January 3, 1949	7th term	
121	James B. Frazier Jr.	D	TN-03	January 3, 1949	7th term	Left the House in 1963.
122	William J. Green Jr.	D	PA-05	January 3, 1949; Previous service, 1945–1947.	8th term*	
123	H. R. Gross	R	IA-03	January 3, 1949	7th term	
124	Wayne Hays	D	OH-18	January 3, 1949	7th term	
125	Albert S. Herlong Jr.	D	FL-05	January 3, 1949	7th term	
126	Peter F. Mack Jr.	D	IL-21	January 3, 1949	7th term	Left the House in 1963.
127	Fred Marshall	D	MN-06	January 3, 1949	7th term	Left the House in 1963.
128	Morgan M. Moulder	D	MO-11	January 3, 1949	7th term	Left the House in 1963.
129	Carl D. Perkins	D	KY-07	January 3, 1949	7th term	
130	Louis C. Rabaut	D	MI-14	January 3, 1949; Previous service, 1935–1947.	13th term*	Died on November 12, 1961.
131	George M. Rhodes	D	PA-14	January 3, 1949	7th term	
132	Peter W. Rodino	D	NJ-10	January 3, 1949	7th term	
133	Harley Orrin Staggers	D	WV-02	January 3, 1949	7th term	
134	Tom Steed	D	OK-04	January 3, 1949	7th term	
135	Homer Thornberry	D	TX-10	January 3, 1949	7th term	
136	Edwin E. Willis	D	LA-03	January 3, 1949	7th term	
137	Sidney R. Yates	D	IL-09	January 3, 1949	7th term	Left the House in 1963.
138	Clement J. Zablocki	D	WI-04	January 3, 1949	7th term	
139	John P. Saylor	R	PA-22	September 13, 1949	7th term	
140	Edna F. Kelly	D	NY-10	November 8, 1949	7th term	
141	John F. Shelley	D	CA-05	November 8, 1949	7th term	
142	William B. Widnall	R	NJ-07	February 6, 1950	7th term	
143	William H. Bates	R	MA-06	February 14, 1950	7th term	
144	E. Ross Adair	R	IN-04	January 3, 1951	6th term	
145	William Hanes Ayres	R	OH-14	January 3, 1951	6th term	
146	Howard Baker Sr.	R	TN-02	January 3, 1951	6th term	
147	Page Belcher	R	OK-01	January 3, 1951	6th term	
148	Ellis Yarnal Berry	R	SD-02	January 3, 1951	6th term	
149	Jackson Edward Betts	R	OH-08	January 3, 1951	6th term	
150	Frank T. Bow	R	OH-16	January 3, 1951	6th term	
151	William G. Bray	R	IN-07	January 3, 1951	6th term	
152	John Chenoweth	R	CO-03	January 3, 1951; Previous service, 1941–1949.	10th term*	
153	Marguerite S. Church	R	IL-13	January 3, 1951	6th term	Left the House in 1963.
154	Thomas B. Curtis	R	MO-02	January 3, 1951	6th term	
155	William Jennings Bryan Dorn	D	SC-03	January 3, 1951; Previous service, 1947–1949.	7th term*	
156	Tic Forrester	D	GA-03	January 3, 1951	6th term	
157	John Jarman	D	OK-05	January 3, 1951	6th term	
158	John C. Kluczynski	D	IL-05	January 3, 1951	6th term	
159	John Lesinski Jr.	D	MI-16	January 3, 1951	6th term	
160	Thaddeus M. Machrowicz	D	MI-01	January 3, 1951	6th term	Resigned on September 18, 1961.
161	George Meader	R	MI-02	January 3, 1951	6th term	
162	William E. Miller	R	NY-40	January 3, 1951	6th term	
163	Walter M. Mumma	R	PA-16	January 3, 1951	6th term	Died on February 25, 1961.
164	Harold C. Ostertag	R	NY-39	January 3, 1951	6th term	
165	B. Carroll Reece	R	TN-01	January 3, 1951; Previous service, 1921–1931 and 1933–1947.	18th term**	Died on March 19, 1961.
166	John J. Riley	D	SC-02	January 3, 1951; Previous service, 1945–1949.	8th term*	Died on January 1, 1962.
167	Kenneth A. Roberts	D	AL-04	January 3, 1951	6th term	
168	Byron G. Rogers	D	CO-01	January 3, 1951	6th term	
169	Walter E. Rogers	D	TX-18	January 3, 1951	6th term	
170	Frank E. Smith	D	MS-03	January 3, 1951	6th term	Resigned on November 14, 1962.
171	William L. Springer	R	IL-22	January 3, 1951	6th term	
172	William Van Pelt	R	WI-06	January 3, 1951	6th term	
173	J. Ernest Wharton	R	NY-29	January 3, 1951	6th term	
174	John C. Watts	D	KY-06	April 4, 1951	6th term	
175	Elizabeth Kee	D	WV-05	July 17, 1951	6th term	
176	Frank N. Ikard	D	TX-13	September 8, 1951	6th term	Resigned on December 15, 1961.
177	Clifford McIntire	R	ME-02	October 22, 1951	6th term	
178	Frank C. Osmers Jr.	R	NJ-09	November 6, 1951; Previous service, 1939–1943.	8th term*	
179	Paul F. Schenck	R	OH-03	November 6, 1951	6th term	
180	Leo W. O'Brien	D	NY-30	April 1, 1952	6th term	
181	John Dowdy	D	TX-07	September 23, 1952	6th term	
182	Hugh Quincy Alexander	D	NC-09	January 3, 1953	5th term	Left the House in 1963.
183	Frank J. Becker	R	NY-03	January 3, 1953	5th term	Left the House in 1963.
184	Edward Boland	D	MA-02	January 3, 1953	5th term	
185	Jack Brooks	D	TX-02	January 3, 1953	5th term	
186	Joel Broyhill	R	VA-10	January 3, 1953	5th term	
187	James A. Byrne	D	PA-03	January 3, 1953	5th term	
188	Elford Albin Cederberg	R	MI-10	January 3, 1953	5th term	
189	Laurence Curtis	R	MA-10	January 3, 1953	5th term	Left the House in 1963.
190	Steven Derounian	R	NY-02	January 3, 1953	5th term	
191	Ed Edmondson	D	OK-02	January 3, 1953	5th term	
192	Paul A. Fino	R	NY-25	January 3, 1953	5th term	
193	Lawrence H. Fountain	D	NC-02	January 3, 1953	5th term	
194	Peter Frelinghuysen Jr.	R	NJ-05	January 3, 1953	5th term	
195	Samuel Friedel	D	MD-07	January 3, 1953	5th term	
196	Charles S. Gubser	R	CA-10	January 3, 1953	5th term	
197	Harlan Hagen	D	CA-14	January 3, 1953	5th term	
198	James A. Haley	D	FL-07	January 3, 1953	5th term	
199	Edgar W. Hiestand	R	CA-21	January 3, 1953	5th term	Left the House in 1963.
200	Lester Holtzman	D	NY-06	January 3, 1953	5th term	Resigned on December 31, 1961.
201	Craig Hosmer	R	CA-18	January 3, 1953	5th term	
202	Charles R. Jonas	R	NC-10	January 3, 1953	5th term	
203	Victor A. Knox	R	MI-11	January 3, 1953	5th term	
204	Melvin Laird	R	WI-07	January 3, 1953	5th term	
205	Phillip M. Landrum	D	GA-09	January 3, 1953	5th term	
206	William S. Mailliard	R	CA-04	January 3, 1953	5th term	
207	Donald H. Magnuson	D	WA-07	January 3, 1953	5th term	Left the House in 1963.
208	Donald Ray Matthews	D	FL-08	January 3, 1953	5th term	
209	John E. Moss	D	CA-03	January 3, 1953	5th term	
210	Barratt O'Hara	D	IL-02	January 3, 1953; Previous service, 1949–1951.	6th term*	
211	Tip O'Neill	D	MA-11	January 3, 1953	5th term	
212	Thomas Pelly	R	WA-01	January 3, 1953	5th term	
213	Gracie Pfost	D	ID-01	January 3, 1953	5th term	Left the House in 1963.
214	John R. Pillion	R	NY-42	January 3, 1953	5th term	
215	Richard Harding Poff	R	VA-06	January 3, 1953	5th term	
216	John H. Ray	R	NY-15	January 3, 1953	5th term	Left the House in 1963.
217	John J. Rhodes	R	AZ-01	January 3, 1953	5th term	
218	Gordon H. Scherer	R	OH-01	January 3, 1953	5th term	Left the House in 1963.
219	Armistead Selden	D	AL-06	January 3, 1953	5th term	
220	Leonor Sullivan	D	MO-03	January 3, 1953	5th term	
221	T. Ashton Thompson	D	LA-07	January 3, 1953	5th term	
222	James B. Utt	R	CA-28	January 3, 1953	5th term	
223	Jack Westland	R	WA-02	January 3, 1953	5th term	
224	Bob Wilson	R	CA-30	January 3, 1953	5th term	
225	J. Arthur Younger	R	CA-09	January 3, 1953	5th term	
226	J. L. Pilcher	D	GA-02	February 4, 1953	5th term	
227	William M. Tuck	D	VA-05	April 14, 1953	5th term	
228	Robert T. Ashmore	D	SC-04	June 2, 1953	5th term	
229	William Natcher	D	KY-02	August 1, 1953	5th term	
230	Lester Johnson	D	WI-09	October 13, 1953	5th term	
231	Glenard P. Lipscomb	R	CA-24	November 10, 1953	5th term	
232	John James Flynt Jr.	D	GA-04	November 2, 1954	5th term	
233	Bruce Alger	R	TX-05	January 3, 1955	4th term	
234	Victor Anfuso	D	NY-08	January 3, 1955; Previous service, 1951–1953.	5th term*	Left the House in 1963.
235	Thomas W. L. Ashley	D	OH-09	January 3, 1955	4th term	
236	William H. Avery	R	KS-01	January 3, 1955	4th term	
237	John F. Baldwin Jr.	R	CA-06	January 3, 1955	4th term	
238	Perkins Bass	R	NH-02	January 3, 1955	4th term	Left the House in 1963.
239	Ross Bass	D	TN-06	January 3, 1955	4th term	
240	Iris Faircloth Blitch	D	GA-08	January 3, 1955	4th term	Left the House in 1963.
241	Frank M. Clark	D	PA-25	January 3, 1955	4th term	
242	William C. Cramer	R	FL-01	January 3, 1955	4th term	
243	Winfield K. Denton	D	IN-08	January 3, 1955; Previous service, 1949–1953.	6th term*	
244	Charles Diggs	D	MI-13	January 3, 1955	4th term	
245	Dante Fascell	D	FL-04	January 3, 1955	4th term	
246	Daniel J. Flood	D	PA-11	January 3, 1955; Previous service, 1945–1947 and 1949–1953.	7th term**	
247	Kenneth J. Gray	D	IL-25	January 3, 1955	4th term	
248	Edith Green	D	OR-03	January 3, 1955	4th term	
249	Martha Griffiths	D	MI-17	January 3, 1955	4th term	
250	George Huddleston Jr.	D	AL-09	January 3, 1955	4th term	
251	William Raleigh Hull Jr.	D	MO-06	January 3, 1955	4th term	
252	W. Pat Jennings	D	VA-09	January 3, 1955	4th term	
253	August E. Johansen	R	MI-03	January 3, 1955	4th term	
254	Joe M. Kilgore	D	TX-15	January 3, 1955	4th term	
255	Richard Lankford	D	MD-05	January 3, 1955	4th term	
256	Torbert Macdonald	D	MA-08	January 3, 1955	4th term	
257	William Edwin Minshall Jr.	R	OH-23	January 3, 1955	4th term	
258	Henry S. Reuss	D	WI-05	January 3, 1955	4th term	
259	James Roosevelt	D	CA-26	January 3, 1955	4th term	
260	J. T. Rutherford	D	TX-16	January 3, 1955	4th term	Left the House in 1963.
261	Fred Schwengel	R	IA-01	January 3, 1955	4th term	
262	Eugene Siler	R	KY-08	January 3, 1955	4th term	
263	Bernice F. Sisk	D	CA-12	January 3, 1955	4th term	
264	Charles M. Teague	R	CA-13	January 3, 1955	4th term	
265	Frank Thompson	D	NJ-04	January 3, 1955	4th term	
266	Stewart Udall	D	AZ-02	January 3, 1955	4th term	Resigned on January 18, 1961.
267	Charles Vanik	D	OH-21	January 3, 1955	4th term	
268	Phillip Hart Weaver	R	NE-01	January 3, 1955	4th term	Left the House in 1963.
269	Jim Wright	D	TX-12	January 3, 1955	4th term	
270	Herbert Zelenko	D	NY-21	January 3, 1955	4th term	Left the House in 1963.
271	Paul Rogers	D	FL-06	January 11, 1955	4th term	
272	John Dingell	D	MI-15	December 13, 1955	4th term	
273	Elmer J. Holland	D	PA-30	January 24, 1956; Previous service, 1942–1943.	5th term*	
274	James C. Healey	D	NY-22	February 7, 1956	4th term	
275	Kathryn E. Granahan	D	PA-02	November 6, 1956	4th term	Left the House in 1963.
276	Walter S. Baring Jr.	D	NV	January 3, 1957; Previous service, 1949–1953.	5th term*	
277	Lindley Beckworth	D	TX-03	January 3, 1957; Previous service, 1939–1953.	10th term*	
278	James Floyd Breeding	R	KS-05	January 3, 1957	3rd term	Left the House in 1963.
279	William Broomfield	R	MI-18	January 3, 1957	3rd term	
280	Charles E. Chamberlain	R	MI-06	January 3, 1957	3rd term	
281	Merwin Coad	D	IA-06	January 3, 1957	3rd term	Left the House in 1963.
282	Harold R. Collier	R	IL-10	January 3, 1957	3rd term	
283	Glenn Cunningham	R	NE-02	January 3, 1957	3rd term	
284	Willard S. Curtin	R	PA-08	January 3, 1957	3rd term	
285	Edwin B. Dooley	R	NY-26	January 3, 1957	3rd term	Left the House in 1963.
286	Florence P. Dwyer	R	NJ-06	January 3, 1957	3rd term	
287	Leonard Farbstein	D	NY-19	January 3, 1957	3rd term	
288	Robert P. Griffin	R	MI-09	January 3, 1957	3rd term	
289	Robert W. Hemphill	D	SC-05	January 3, 1957	3rd term	
290	Alvin Paul Kitchin	D	NC-08	January 3, 1957	3rd term	Left the House in 1963.
291	Alton Lennon	D	NC-07	January 3, 1957	3rd term	
292	Joseph Carlton Loser	D	TN-05	January 3, 1957	3rd term	Left the House in 1963.
293	John J. McFall	D	CA-11	January 3, 1957	3rd term	
294	Robert Michel	R	IL-18	January 3, 1957	3rd term	
295	Arch A. Moore Jr.	R	WV-01	January 3, 1957	3rd term	
296	Alfred E. Santangelo	D	NY-18	January 3, 1957	3rd term	Left the House in 1963.
297	Dalip Singh Saund	D	CA-29	January 3, 1957	3rd term	Left the House in 1963.
298	Ralph James Scott	D	NC-05	January 3, 1957	3rd term	
299	H. Allen Smith	R	CA-20	January 3, 1957	3rd term	
300	Al Ullman	D	OR-02	January 3, 1957	3rd term	
301	Basil Lee Whitener	D	NC-11	January 3, 1957	3rd term	
302	John Andrew Young	D	TX-14	January 3, 1957	3rd term	
303	Joseph Montoya	D	NM	April 9, 1957	3rd term	
304	Milton W. Glenn	R	NJ-02	November 5, 1957	3rd term	
305	Roland V. Libonati	D	IL-07	December 31, 1957	3rd term	
306	Howard W. Robison	R	NY-37	January 14, 1958	3rd term	
307	John Herman Dent	D	PA-21	January 21, 1958	3rd term	
308	Fats Everett	D	TN-08	February 1, 1958	3rd term	
309	Al Quie	R	MN-01	February 18, 1958	3rd term	
310	Robert N.C. Nix Sr.	D	PA-04	May 20, 1958	3rd term	
311	Dale Alford	D	AR-05	January 3, 1959	2nd term	Left the House in 1963.
312	Robert R. Barry	R	NY-27	January 3, 1959	2nd term	
313	John Brademas	D	IN-03	January 3, 1959	2nd term	
314	Daniel Brewster	D	MD-02	January 3, 1959	2nd term	Left the House in 1963.
315	Frank W. Burke	D	KY-03	January 3, 1959	2nd term	Left the House in 1963.
316	James A. Burke	D	MA-13	January 3, 1959	2nd term	
317	William T. Cahill	R	NJ-01	January 3, 1959	2nd term	
318	Robert R. Casey	D	TX-22	January 3, 1959	2nd term	
319	Jeffery Cohelan	D	CA-07	January 3, 1959	2nd term	
320	Silvio O. Conte	R	MA-01	January 3, 1959	2nd term	
321	Robert E. Cook	D	OH-11	January 3, 1959	2nd term	Left the House in 1963.
322	Emilio Q. Daddario	D	CT-01	January 3, 1959	2nd term	
323	Dominick V. Daniels	D	NJ-14	January 3, 1959	2nd term	
324	Ed Derwinski	R	IL-04	January 3, 1959	2nd term	
325	Samuel L. Devine	R	OH-12	January 3, 1959	2nd term	
326	Thomas N. Downing	D	VA-01	January 3, 1959	2nd term	
327	Thaddeus J. Dulski	D	NY-41	January 3, 1959	2nd term	
328	Cornelius Edward Gallagher	D	NJ-13	January 3, 1959	2nd term	
329	Robert Giaimo	D	CT-03	January 3, 1959	2nd term	
330	Seymour Halpern	R	NY-04	January 3, 1959	2nd term	
331	Ken Hechler	D	WV-04	January 3, 1959	2nd term	
332	Elmer J. Hoffman	R	IL-14	January 3, 1959	2nd term	
333	Harold T. Johnson	D	CA-02	January 3, 1959	2nd term	
334	Thomas Francis Johnson	D	MD-01	January 3, 1959	2nd term	Left the House in 1963.
335	Joseph Karth	D	MN-04	January 3, 1959	2nd term	
336	Robert Kastenmeier	D	WI-02	January 3, 1959	2nd term	
337	Hastings Keith	R	MA-09	January 3, 1959	2nd term	
338	David S. King	D	UT-02	January 3, 1959	2nd term	Left the House in 1963.
339	Frank Kowalski	D	CT	January 3, 1959	2nd term	Left the House in 1963.
340	Odin Langen	R	MN-09	January 3, 1959	2nd term	
341	Del Latta	R	OH-05	January 3, 1959	2nd term	
342	John Lindsay	R	NY-17	January 3, 1959	2nd term	
343	Catherine Dean May	R	WA-04	January 3, 1959	2nd term	
344	Harris B. McDowell Jr.	D	DE	January 3, 1959; Previous service, 1955–1957.	3rd term*	
345	Harold B. McSween	D	LA-08	January 3, 1959	2nd term	Left the House in 1963.
346	Clement Woodnutt Miller	D	CA-01	January 3, 1959	2nd term	Died on October 7, 1962.
347	William H. Milliken Jr.	R	PA-07	January 3, 1959	2nd term	
348	Walter H. Moeller	D	OH-10	January 3, 1959	2nd term	Left the House in 1963.
349	John S. Monagan	D	CT-05	January 3, 1959	2nd term	
350	William S. Moorhead	D	PA-28	January 3, 1959	2nd term	
351	Thomas G. Morris	D	NM	January 3, 1959	2nd term	
352	William T. Murphy	D	IL-03	January 3, 1959	2nd term	
353	Ancher Nelsen	R	MN-02	January 3, 1959	2nd term	
354	James G. O'Hara	D	MI-07	January 3, 1959	2nd term	
355	Alexander Pirnie	R	NY-34	January 3, 1959	2nd term	
356	Roman C. Pucinski	D	IL-11	January 3, 1959	2nd term	
357	Ralph Julian Rivers	D	AK	January 3, 1959	2nd term	
358	Dan Rostenkowski	D	IL-08	January 3, 1959	2nd term	
359	J. Edward Roush	D	IN-05	January 3, 1959	2nd term	
360	George E. Shipley	D	IL-23	January 3, 1959	2nd term	
361	Don L. Short	R	ND	January 3, 1959	2nd term	
362	John M. Slack Jr.	D	WV-06	January 3, 1959	2nd term	
363	Neal Smith	D	IA-05	January 3, 1959	2nd term	
364	Samuel S. Stratton	D	NY-32	January 3, 1959	2nd term	
365	Frank Stubblefield	D	KY-01	January 3, 1959	2nd term	
366	Herman Toll	D	PA-06	January 3, 1959	2nd term	
367	George M. Wallhauser	R	NJ-12	January 3, 1959	2nd term	
368	Jessica M. Weis	R	NY-38	January 3, 1959	2nd term	Left the House in 1963.
369	William J. Randall	D	MO-04	March 3, 1959	2nd term	
370	Charles Goodell	R	NY-43	May 26, 1959	2nd term	
371	Daniel Inouye	D	HI	August 21, 1959	2nd term	Left the House in 1963.
372	John Henry Kyl	R	IA-04	December 15, 1959	2nd term	
373	Jacob H. Gilbert	D	NY-23	March 8, 1960	2nd term	
374	Herman T. Schneebeli	R	PA-17	April 26, 1960	2nd term	
375	Roy A. Taylor	D	NC-12	June 25, 1960	2nd term	
376	Julia Butler Hansen	D	WA-03	November 8, 1960	2nd term	
377	J. Irving Whalley	R	PA-18	November 8, 1960	2nd term	
378	Joseph Patrick Addabbo	D	NY-05	January 3, 1961	1st term	
379	John B. Anderson	R	IL-16	January 3, 1961	1st term	
380	John M. Ashbrook	R	OH-17	January 3, 1961	1st term	
381	James F. Battin	R	MT-02	January 3, 1961	1st term	
382	Alphonzo E. Bell Jr.	R	CA-16	January 3, 1961	1st term	
383	Ralph F. Beermann	R	NE-03	January 3, 1961	1st term	
384	James E. Bromwell	R	IA-02	January 3, 1961	1st term	
385	Horace Seely-Brown Jr.	R	CT-02	January 3, 1961; Previous service, 1947–1949 and 1951–1959.	6th term**	Left the House in 1963.
386	Donald C. Bruce	R	IN-11	January 3, 1961	1st term	
387	Hugh Carey	D	NY-12	January 3, 1961	1st term	
388	Donald D. Clancy	R	OH-02	January 3, 1961	1st term	
389	James C. Corman	D	CA-22	January 3, 1961	1st term	
390	John W. Davis	D	GA-07	January 3, 1961	1st term	
391	Edwin Russell Durno	R	OR-04	January 3, 1961	1st term	Left the House in 1963.
392	Bob Dole	R	KS-06	January 3, 1961	1st term	
393	Peter H. Dominick	R	CO-02	January 3, 1961	1st term	Left the House in 1963.
394	Robert Ellsworth	R	KS-02	January 3, 1961	1st term	
395	Paul Findley	R	IL-20	January 3, 1961	1st term	
396	Edward Rowan Finnegan	D	IL-12	January 3, 1961	1st term	
397	Peter A. Garland	R	ME-01	January 3, 1961	1st term	Left the House in 1963.
398	Fernand St. Germain	D	RI-01	January 3, 1961	1st term	
399	George Atlee Goodling	R	PA-19	January 3, 1961	1st term	
400	George Elliott Hagan	D	GA-01	January 3, 1961	1st term	
401	Durward Gorham Hall	R	MO-07	January 3, 1961	1st term	
402	Ralph R. Harding	D	ID-02	January 3, 1961	1st term	
403	William H. Harrison	R	WY	January 3, 1961; Previous service, 1951–1955.	3rd term*	
404	Bill Harsha	R	OH-06	January 3, 1961	1st term	
405	R. James Harvey	R	MI-08	January 3, 1961	1st term	
406	Ralph Harvey	R	IN-10	January 3, 1961; Previous service, 1947–1959.	7th term*	
407	David N. Henderson	D	NC-03	January 3, 1961	1st term	
408	Richard Howard Ichord Jr.	D	MO-08	January 3, 1961	1st term	
409	Charles Samuel Joelson	D	NJ-08	January 3, 1961	1st term	
410	Carleton J. King	R	NY-31	January 3, 1961	1st term	
411	Horace R. Kornegay	D	NC-06	January 3, 1961	1st term	
412	Clark MacGregor	R	MN-03	January 3, 1961	1st term	
413	Charles Mathias	D	MD-06	January 3, 1961	1st term	
414	David Martin	R	NE-04	January 3, 1961	1st term	
415	Walter Lewis McVey	R	KS-03	January 3, 1961	1st term	Left the House in 1963.
416	Tom Van Horn Moorehead	R	OH-15	January 3, 1961	1st term	Left the House in 1963.
417	F. Bradford Morse	R	MA-05	January 3, 1961	1st term	
418	Charles Adams Mosher	R	OH-13	January 3, 1961	1st term	
419	Hjalmar Carl Nygaard	R	ND	January 3, 1961	1st term	
420	Arnold Olsen	D	MT-01	January 3, 1961	1st term	
421	M. Blaine Peterson	D	UT-01	January 3, 1961	1st term	Left the House in 1963.
422	Otis G. Pike	D	NY-01	January 3, 1961	1st term	
423	Ben Reifel	R	SD-01	January 3, 1961	1st term	
424	Richard L. Roudebush	R	IN-06	January 3, 1961	1st term	
425	John H. Rousselot	R	CA-25	January 3, 1961	1st term	Left the House in 1963.
426	William Fitts Ryan	D	NY-20	January 3, 1961	1st term	
427	Henry C. Schadeberg	R	WI-01	January 3, 1961	1st term	
428	Richard Schweiker	R	PA-13	January 3, 1961	1st term	
429	William Scranton	R	PA-10	January 3, 1961	1st term	Left the House in 1963.
430	Garner E. Shriver	R	KS-04	January 3, 1961	1st term	
431	Abner W. Sibal	R	CT-04	January 3, 1961	1st term	
432	Robert Stafford	R	VT	January 3, 1961	1st term	
433	Robert Grier Stephens Jr.	D	GA-10	January 3, 1961	1st term	
434	Vernon Wallace Thomson	R	WI-03	January 3, 1961	1st term	
435	Stanley R. Tupper	R	ME-03	January 3, 1961	1st term	
436	Victor Wickersham	D	OK-06	January 3, 1961; Previous service, 1941–1947 and 1949–1957.	8th term**	
437	Earl Wilson	R	IN-09	January 3, 1961; Previous service, 1941–1959.	10th term*	
	Catherine Dorris Norrell	D	AR-06	April 19, 1961	1st term	Left the House in 1963.
	Mo Udall	D	AZ-02	May 2, 1961	1st term	
	John C. Kunkel	R	PA-16	May 16, 1961; Previous service, 1939–1951.	7th term*	
	Louise Goff Reece	R	TN-01	May 16, 1961	1st term	Left the House in 1963.
	Henry B. González	D	TX-20	November 4, 1961	1st term	
	Lucien N. Nedzi	D	MI-01	November 7, 1961	1st term	
	Joe Waggonner	D	LA-04	December 19, 1961	1st term	
	Graham B. Purcell Jr.	D	TX-13	January 27, 1962	1st term	
	Ray Roberts	D	TX-04	January 30, 1962	1st term	
	Harold M. Ryan	D	MI-14	February 13, 1962	1st term	
	Benjamin S. Rosenthal	D	NY-06	February 20, 1962	1st term	
	Corinne Boyd Riley	D	SC-02	April 10, 1962	1st term	Left the House in 1963.

== Delegates ==
Rank	Delegate	Party	District	Seniority date (Previous service, if any)	No.# of term(s)	Notes
1	Antonio Fernós-Isern	D	PR	September 11, 1946	9th term	

== See also ==
- 87th United States Congress
- List of United States congressional districts
- List of United States senators in the 87th Congress
