= United States–China Relations Act of 2000 =

US act on trade barriers with China

- Other short titles: China Trade bill; PNTR for China bill
- Long title: To authorize extension of nondiscriminatory treatment (normal trade relations treatment) to the People's Republic of China, and to establish a framework for relations between the United States and the People's Republic of China
- Enacted by: the 106th United States Congress
- Effective: October 10, 2000; 26 years ago

Citations
- Public law: Pub. L. 106–286 (text) (PDF)
- Statutes at Large: 114 Stat. 880 (2000)

Legislative history
- Introduced in the House as H.R. 4444 by Bill Archer (R–TX) on May 15, 2000; Committee consideration by Committee on Ways and Means; Passed the House on May 24, 2000 (Yeas: 237; Nays: 197); Passed the Senate on September 19, 2000 (Yeas: 83; Nays: 15); Signed into law by President Bill Clinton on October 10, 2000

The U.S.–China Relations Act of 2000 is an act of the United States Congress that granted People's Republic of China permanent normal trade relations (NTR) status (previously called most favoured nation (MFN)) when China becomes a full member of the World Trade Organization (WTO), ending annual review and approval of NTR. It was signed into law on October 10, 2000, by United States President Bill Clinton. The Act also establishes a Congressional-Executive Commission to ensure that China complies with internationally recognized human rights laws, meets labor standards and allows religious freedom, and establishes a task force to prohibit the importation of Chinese products that were made in forced labor camps or prisons. The Act also includes so-called "anti-dumping" measures designed to prevent an influx of inexpensive Chinese goods into the United States that might hurt American industries making the same goods. It allows new duties and restrictions on Chinese imports that "threaten to cause market disruption to the U.S. producers of a like or directly competitive product."

Prior to passage of the bill, China was subject to an annual review by Congress of China's trade status with the United States. Since 1980, the president has had to issue annual waivers to trade with China. The act removed the review, eased some trade barriers, and facilitated China's entry into the WTO. China became a member of WTO on December 11, 2001, and its permanent normal trade relations status with the US was made permanent on December 27, 2001.

== Background ==
China and the United States are some of world's largest economies, ranked 1st and 2nd, in terms of GDP (PPP). China as the world's largest exporter and the United States as the world's largest importer. They have so far been important pillars for the global economy.

Formal diplomatic relations between the United States and the People's Republic of China were not established until 1979, and even afterwards, trade relations were hampered by the high tariff rates of the Smoot–Hawley Tariff Act of 1930. After the two governments settled asset claims dating from the Korean War in 1950, Congress temporarily granted China most favored nation status in 1980. However, Chinese-American trade was still hindered by the Jackson–Vanik amendment of 1974, which made trade with the United States contingent on certain human rights metrics. The Jackson–Vanik amendment enabled the president to issue an annual waiver, which were issued from 1980. However, this requirement was inconsistent with the rules of the World Trade Organization (WTO) that prohibit discrimination of members, so the United States opposed China's membership of WTO.

By 1984, the United States had become China's third-largest trading partner, and China became America's 14th largest. However, the annual renewal of China's MFN status was constantly challenged by anti-Chinese pressure groups during US congressional hearings. For example, U.S. imports from China almost doubled within five years from $51.5 billion in 1996 to $102 billion in 2001. The American textile industry lobbied Congress for, and received, tariffs on Chinese textiles according to the WTO Agreement on Textiles and Clothing. In reaction to the 1989 Tiananmen Square protests and massacre, the Bush I administration and Congress imposed administrative and legal constraints on investment, exports, and other trade relations with China. In 1991, China only accounted for 1% of total imports to the United States. The Clinton presidency from 1992 started with an executive order (128590) that linked renewal of China's MFN status with seven human rights conditions, including "preservation of Tibetan indigenous religion and culture" and "access to prisons for international human rights organizations"—Clinton reversed this position a year later. Other challenges to Sino-American relations in this decade included the Cox Committee investigations against supposed nonprofit involvement in "promoting communism", the persecution of Taiwanese-American scientist Wen Ho Lee for unproven allegations of espionage for the PRC, and the 1999 United States bombing of the Chinese embassy in Belgrade. But relations warmed after the September 2001 initiation of the war on terror.

For many years, China was the most important country which required an annual waiver to maintain free trade status. The waiver for the PRC had been in effect since 1980. Every year between 1989 and 1999, legislation was introduced in Congress to disapprove the President's waiver. The legislation had sought to tie free trade with China to meeting certain human rights conditions that go beyond freedom of emigration. All such attempted legislation failed to pass. The requirement of an annual waiver was inconsistent with the rules of the World Trade Organization, and for the PRC to join the WTO, Congressional action was needed to grant permanent normal trade relations (PNTR) to China. This was accomplished in 2000 with the United States–China Relations Act of 2000, allowing China to join WTO in 2001. China's most favoured nation (MFN) status was made permanent on December 27, 2001.

The historic deal had been President Bill Clinton’s top priority in the waning days of his last term. This bill passed the House with 74% Republican support and 34% Democrat support. The bill garnered much more support in the Senate with 90% of Republicans and 80% of Democrats in support. This bill was to approve the U.S.-China trade agreement and China's accession to the WTO, saying that more trade with China would advance America's economic interests: "Economically, this agreement is the equivalent of a one-way street. It requires China to open its markets—with a fifth of the world’s population, potentially the biggest markets in the world—to both our products and services in unprecedented new ways," said Clinton. In a speech in 2000, Clinton reiterated his hopes:

For the first time, our companies will be able to sell and distribute products in China made by workers here in America without being forced to relocate manufacturing to China, sell through the Chinese government, or transfer valuable technology—for the first time. We’ll be able to export products without exporting jobs.

As a new member, China agreed to rapidly lower import tariffs and open its markets, although many trade officials doubted it would stand by those promises. China did cut tariffs after it joined the WTO, but it nonetheless continued to steal U.S. intellectual property (IP) and forced American companies to transfer technology to access the Chinese market, which were violations of WTO rules.

== Impact ==
U.S. trade deficit (in billions, goods and services) by country in 2014

When President Barack Obama met with General Secretary of the Chinese Communist Party Hu Jintao in 2011, officials were concerned that China was not acting in the free trade spirit it agreed to when it joined the WTO 10 years earlier. They proclaimed that China was still restricting foreign investment, avoiding national treatment of foreign firms, failing to protect intellectual property rights, and distorting trade with its government subsidies. There were also complaints by various lawmakers who wanted the administration to act against what they said was China's manipulating its currency, worried that it would allow China to underprice its exports and put American and other nations' manufacturing at a great disadvantage.

The U.S.-China Business Council in 2014 said that China was restricting investment in more than 100 industrial sectors, including agriculture, petrochemicals and health services, while the U.S. was restricting investment outright in just five sectors. A number of senators and congressmen wanted the White House to place tariffs on some of the underpriced Chinese imports, stating that if the administration wouldn't do so, they threatened to mandate some tariffs on their own. By 2018, U.S. manufacturing jobs had decreased by almost 5 million since 2000, with the decline accelerating.

== See also ==
- US labor law
- China–United States trade war
- Permanent normal trade relations
- Most favoured nation
- Chinagate
