= Dawson Mathis =

American politician (1940–2017)

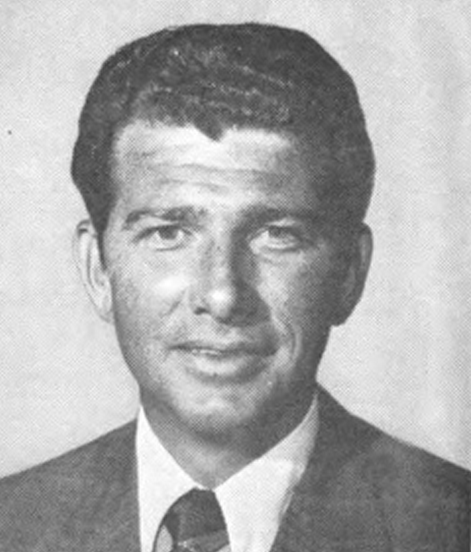
- Mathis, c. 1971

Member of the U.S. House of Representatives from Georgia's 2nd district
- In office January 3, 1971 – January 3, 1981
- Preceded by: Maston E. O'Neal Jr.
- Succeeded by: Charles Hatcher

Personal details
- Born: Marvin Dawson Mathis; November 30, 1940 Nashville, Georgia, US
- Died: April 17, 2017 (aged 76) Tifton, Georgia, US
- Party: Democratic
- Education: South Georgia College
- Occupation: Politician

Marvin Dawson Mathis (November 30, 1940 – April 17, 2017) was an American politician. A Democrat, he was a member of the United States House of Representatives from Georgia.

== Early life ==
Mathis was born on November 30, 1940, in Nashville, Georgia, the son of Marvin W. Mathis and Nell Dawson (née Abel) Mathis. Educated at public schools in Nashville, he studied at South Georgia State College. From 1964 to 1970, he was director of WALB.

== Career ==
Mathis was a Democrat. He was a member of the United States House of Representatives from January 3, 1971, to January 3, 1981, representing Georgia's 2nd district. While serving, he was a member of the Committees on Agriculture and on Interior and Insular Affairs.

Mathis unsuccessfully ran for the United States Senate in 1980, losing the primary to Herman Talmadge. He then unsuccessfully ran again for the House in 1982. Ideologically, he was conservative. He supported low taxes, small government spending, and national defense.

After serving in Congress, Mathis became a lobbyist, as which he represented MassMutual, the Pacific Gas and Electric Company, the United Parcel Service, and the Westinghouse Electric Corporation, among other clients. He retired in 2009.

== Personal life and death ==
On July 26, 1959, Mathis married Patricia Ann Connell, with their marriage ending in divorce. He then married Sharon Beavers, who he also divorced. He married his third wife, Cathy-Jo Kaseman, c. 2005. He had four children, all from his first marriage.

In 2005, Mathis moved from Washington, D.C., back to Nashville. In his later years, he lived in Berrien County. He was a member of the Benevolent and Protective Order of Elks, the National Fraternal Order of Police, and Toastmasters International. He died on April 17, 2017, aged 76, in Tifton, from heart failure.

U.S. House of Representatives
Preceded by Maston E. O'Neal, Jr.	Member of the U.S. House of Representatives from Georgia's 2nd congressional district January 3, 1971 – January 3, 1981	Succeeded by Charles Floyd Hatcher
