= B. Carroll Reece =

American politician (1889–1961)

Carroll Reece
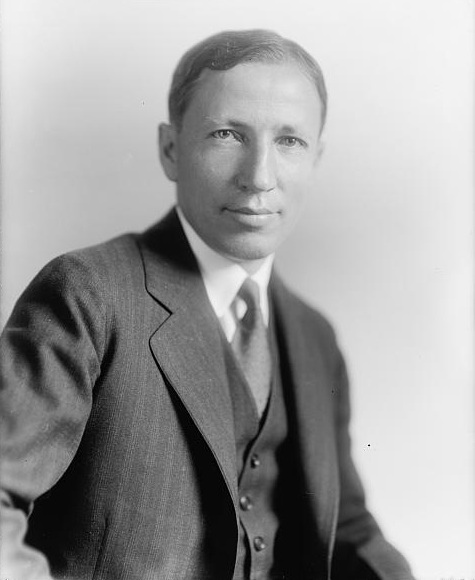
- Reece c. 1924

Member of the U.S. House of Representatives from Tennessee's 1st district
- In office January 3, 1951 – March 19, 1961
- Preceded by: Dayton E. Phillips
- Succeeded by: Louise Goff Reece
- In office March 4, 1933 – January 3, 1947
- Preceded by: Oscar Lovette
- Succeeded by: Dayton E. Phillips
- In office March 4, 1921 – March 3, 1931
- Preceded by: Sam R. Sells
- Succeeded by: Oscar Lovette

Chair of the Republican National Committee
- In office April 1, 1946 – June 27, 1948
- Preceded by: Herbert Brownell Jr.
- Succeeded by: Hugh Scott

Personal details
- Born: Brazilla Carroll Reece; December 22, 1889 Butler, Tennessee, U.S.
- Died: March 19, 1961 (aged 71) Bethesda, Maryland, U.S.
- Party: Republican
- Spouse: Louise Goff
- Education: Appalachian State University; Carson-Newman University (BA); New York University (MA); London School of Economics

Brazilla Carroll Reece (December 22, 1889 – March 19, 1961) was an American Republican Party politician from Tennessee. He represented eastern Tennessee in the United States House of Representatives for all but six years from 1921 to 1961 and served as the Chair of the Republican National Committee from 1946 to 1948. A conservative, he led the party's Old Right wing alongside Robert A. Taft in crusading against interventionism, communism, and the Progressive policies pursued by the Roosevelt and Truman administrations.

From 1953 to 1954, as chairman of the House Select Committee to Investigate Tax-Exempt Foundations and Comparable Organizations, often called the Reece Committee, he led an investigation of Communist activities by non-profit organizations, particularly educational institutions and charitable foundations. The Reece Committee concluded that foundations were actively embroiled in efforts to promote socialist and collectivist ideologies.

== Early life ==
Reece was born on a farm near Butler, Tennessee, as one of thirteen children of John Isaac and Sarah Maples Reece. He was named for Brazilla Carroll McBride, an ancestor who served in the War of 1812, but never used his first name. His brother, Raleigh Valentine Reece, was a reporter for the Nashville Tennessean and the teacher who replaced John Thomas Scopes at Rhea County High School in Dayton, Tennessee following the infamous "Monkey Trial."

Reece attended Watauga Academy in Butler, Tennessee and Carson-Newman College in Jefferson City, Tennessee. At Carson-Newman he played basketball and football. After graduating from Carson-Newman in 1914 as class valedictorian, he worked as a high school principal for one year, then enrolled in New York University, where he earned a master's degree in economics and finance in 1916. He also studied at the University of London.

== Career ==
He was an assistant secretary and instructor at New York University in 1916 and 1917.

In April, 1917 Reece enlisted for World War I and attended officer training in Plattsburgh, New York. During the war he served initially with the 166th Infantry Regiment, a unit of the 42nd Infantry Division. He later transferred to 102nd Infantry Regiment, 26th Infantry Division. He commanded a company, then commanded the regiment's 3rd Battalion, and attained the rank of captain. He was discharged in 1919, and was decorated with the Distinguished Service Cross, Distinguished Service Medal, Purple Heart, and French Croix de Guerre with Palm.

He was director of the School of Business Administration of New York University in 1919 and 1920, and also studied law there.

He then passed the bar exam and opened a successful law practice in Johnson City, where he was also a banker and publisher.

Reece was married to Louise Goff, daughter of United States Senator Guy Despard Goff of West Virginia.

== Congressional service ==
Reece served as a delegate to the Republican National Conventions in 1928, 1932, 1936, 1940, 1944, and 1948. He was a member of the Board of Regents of the Smithsonian Institution in 1945 and 1946.

According to a 1981 pamphlet by Stephen Alan Sampson of Anti-Communist Crusade, republished by Liberty University, Reece was a conservative derided by intraparty moderates as an "Old Guard reactionary".

=== Denying renomination of Sam R. Sells and winning election to the U.S. House ===
Reece first successfully ran for the House of Representatives in 1920, challenging incumbent Republican Sam R. Sells. Although supporters of Sells initially dismissed Reece's candidacy as a joke, the political newcomer ran on his military service as Sells campaigned on his personality rather than his congressional voting record. During the campaign, Reece, who went to all counties in the district, promised to serve only up to ten years, a vow he eventually broke. He also attacked the incumbent Sells, a lumber businessman, for alleged conflicts of interest in voting to "exempt excess profit taxes on corporations," furthermore stating:

Why don’t your congressman and mine in explaining how much he made in 1917 and 1918, tell our people how much he made in 1919, and why he voted to exempt these excess profits from taxes?

Reece ultimately defeated Sells in an upset to win the GOP nomination and cruise to victory in the general election. He would later recount his first interaction with his predecessor:

Old Goliath showed that same spirit when he came face to face with David. What his attitude implied was, do you think that you can oppose me for this office? He knew who I was. Well might he have recalled the days when my father and mother lived in a log cabin which sat within the shadow of his mother’s stately mansion, and when I came to the back door of his house peddling butter and eggs. He thought he could break my spirit and that I would sneak away like a whipped cur. ‘You haven’t a chance to win the nomination,’ he said. ‘I’m in better shape than ever financially to fight competition, and when I get ready to retire I am going to name my successor.’ There was just one thing my friend overlooked and that is you can’t disregard the wishes of a great people in things like this.

The region had voted not to secede at the state convention in 1861. This region was heavily Republican—in fact, Republicans had represented this district for all but four years since 1859, and was one of the few regions in the former Confederacy where Republicans won on a regular basis.

=== 1920s ===
Once in office, Reece placed heavy emphasis on helping constituents with problems both large and small, a precedent continued by later elected Republicans from Eastern Tennessee. In 1922, Reece joined the majority of his House Republican colleagues in voting for the Dyer Anti-Lynching Bill.

==== 1930 defeat, 1932 comeback ====
Following his first election, Reece was re-elected four consecutive times. He lost in the 1930 midterms to Independent Republican Oscar Lovette following backlash from constituents over the George W. Norris Muscle Shoals bill (the Senate version, which is considered a forerunner to the Tennessee Valley Authority) being vetoed by President Herbert Hoover as well as having failed to ensure the Cove Creek Dam being built. Many of Reece's constituents turned against him due to his siding with private enterprise in his support of Muscle Shoals development over the government initiative to provide nitrates for farmers, which Lovette emphasized his support for. The incumbent congressman, who President Hoover offered to help in his sinking re-election bid, claimed that the Muscle Shoals bill introduced by Norris which emphasized a larger size and scope of the federal government "originated in Red Russia."

Reece ran for his old seat in 1932, campaigning in part against the refusal of Lovette to maintain consistent affiliation as a Republican (Lovette ran as an "Independent Republican" in the general election, again). During this period, although he was out of office during the time, his favorability among President Hoover ensured that patronage and significant influence went through his hands rather than Lovette's. Reece narrowly re-emerged successfully and defeated Lovette, who in turn claimed voter fraud. An investigation by a House subcommittee uncovered some "questionable" election procedures practices, though Reece was ultimately seated.

However, the landslide defeats the GOP suffered nationally that year would mark the start of solid Democratic control in the federal government as the Great Depression continued. Reece continued being re-elected consecutively until unsuccessfully running for an open Senate seat in 1948; afterwards he returned to the House yet again and continued serving until his death. According to Tennessee historian Ray Hill, a historian who writes for The Knoxville Focus:

Reece never forgot why he had lost to Oscar B. Lovette in 1930; following his return to the House of Representatives, Carroll Reece became a supporter of the Tennessee Valley Authority. Reece frequently voted against the majority of his fellow Republicans, many of whom disliked the very notion of the TVA, to support the Tennessee Valley Authority. When asked why he didn’t go along with his party, Carroll Reece candidly replied no politician in Tennessee could survive politically by opposing the TVA. Reece had fought the bill sponsored by Senator George W. Norris of Nebraska, while Second District Congressman J. Will Taylor had supported it. Reece had lost his seat in Congress because of his opposition while the controversial Taylor had continued to hang on to his seat.

=== Return to the House ===
Reece thus returned to Congress, serving until 1947, when he stepped down to devote his full energies to serving as chairman of the Republican National Committee, a position he had held since 1946.

An adamant conservative, Reece generally opposed the New Deal during the presidency of Franklin D. Roosevelt along with Progressive initiatives such as Federal wage and price controls. He was also an isolationist, according to Sampson, and a non-interventionist prior to World War II and voted against the Lend-Lease Act. A supporter of civil rights, he advocated the passage of federal anti-lynching legislation and anti-poll tax measures.

A member of the conservative "Old Guard" faction of the Republican Party, Reece was a strong supporter of Ohio Senator Robert A. Taft, the leader of the GOP's conservative wing. In 1948 and 1952 Reece was a leading supporter of Taft's candidacy for the Republican presidential nomination; however, Taft lost the nomination both times to moderate Republicans from New York.

Reece was the Republican nominee for an open Senate seat in 1948, but lost to Democratic Congressman Estes Kefauver, who had unseated incumbent Democrat Tom Stewart in the party primary. Kefauver carried the support of the influential editor Edward J. Meeman of the Memphis Press-Scimitar, who had for years fought to topple the Edward "Boss" Crump political machine in Memphis. Crump supported Stewart.

=== Republican Party leadership ===
Allied with Ohio senator Taft, who he joined in opposing President Harry S. Truman's anti-inflation plan, Reece succeeded Herbert Brownell, Jr. (later United States Attorney General under president Dwight D. Eisenhower), as the chair of the Republican National Committee in early April 1946 and presided over GOP victories in the 1946 midterms. Due to his independent wealth inherited from his father-in-law, Reece did not accept a salary.

During his tenure in leading the GOP on the national stage, Reece was a part of the conservative faction opposed by Minnesota liberal Republican Harold Stassen and Vermont moderate Republican George Aiken. In February 1948, Reece called for purging communists from the United States, asserting:

...the spread of Communist power throughout the world constitutes the greatest menace to our nation.

Reece also opposed President Truman's use of "public funds" for his Western trip, calling it a "pre-nomination campaign tour."

=== Defeating Phillips, returning to the U.S. House ===
In 1950, Reece ran against the man who succeeded him in the House, Dayton Phillips, and defeated him in the Republican primary. This all but assured him of a return to Congress in the heavily Republican district. He was reelected five more times. When the Republicans gained control of the House after the 1952 elections, Reece served as chairman of the Select Committee to Investigate Tax-Exempt Foundations and Comparable Organizations, losing this post after the Democrats regained control in 1955.

In the 1952 United States presidential election, Reece threw support to Robert A. Taft, who he predicted the GOP delegations in Southern and border states would support. Taft ultimately lost in the Republican primaries to the more moderate Dwight D. Eisenhower, an internationalist.

During his time in Congress, he was a social and fiscal conservative who supported isolationism and civil rights legislation, being one of the few Southern Congressmen who declined to sign the 1956 anti-desegregation Southern Manifesto and voted in favor of the Civil Rights Acts of 1957 and 1960. He was a rarity in politics at the time—a truly senior Republican congressman from a former Confederate state.

==== International controversy ====
During the Cold War, Reece's statement that "The citizens of Danzig are German as they always had been" caused a reply from Jędrzej Giertych, a leading Polish emigrant in London and writer, publicist, and publisher of National Democratic background. Danzig was separated from Germany and had been established as the Free City of Danzig in accordance with the Treaty of Versailles following World War I. It was annexed by Nazi Germany in 1939 and subsequently grouped with Poland in the Potsdam Agreement.

Reece was opposed to the Oder-Neisse line, advocating the return to Germany of its former Eastern territories.

==== Cox Committee ====
Reece was a member of the 1952 Select Committee to Investigate Tax-Exempt Foundations and Comparable Organizations, established by the House in April that year to probe major foundations for subversive activities. It was known during the congressional session as the Cox Committee, named after its chair Eugene "Goober" Cox, a Democratic segregationist from Georgia.

Due to family illnesses, Reece was absent for most of the hearings the Cox Committee conducted. Cox suddenly died in December 1952, and the final report which was soon released cleared the investigated foundations of any wrongdoing. Reece asserted the following, as listed in the Cox Committee report:

As pointed out and stressed in this report, the select committee has had insufficient time for the magnitude of its task. Although I was unable to attend the full hearing I feel compelled to observe that, if a more comprehensive study is desired, the inquiry might be continued by the Eighty-third Congress with profit in view of the importance of the subject, the fact that tax-exempt funds in very large amounts are spent without public accountability or official supervision of any sort, and that, admittedly, considerable question able expenditures have been made.

Among the remaining committee members, only Reece sought a do-over, believing that the scope of the investigations were insufficient. He in addition stated in a long, detailed House speech:

Some of these activities and some of these institutions support efforts to overthrow our Government and to undermine our American way of life.

These activities urgently require investigation. Here lies the story of how communism and socialism are financed in the United States, where they get their money. It is the story of who pays the bill.

There is evidence to show that there is a diabolical conspiracy back of all this. Its aim is the furtherance of socialism in the United States.

The method by which this is done seems fantastic to reasonable men, for these Communists and Socialists seize control of fortunes left behind by Capitalists when they die, and turn these fortunes around to finance the destruction of Capitalism.

The Cox Committee report recommended a possible investigation of whether major foundations used their privileges for the purpose of tax evasion, as stated in page 12 of the report:

The committee regards questions 11 and 12 as matters for the consideration of the Committee on Ways and Means. It therefore has made no attempt to find the answers to these questions. We feel the questions are of sufficient importance to warrant inquiry.

...

We respectfully suggest that the [Committee on Ways and Means] reexamine pertinent tax laws, to the end that they may be so drawn as to encourage the free-enterprise system with its rewards from which private individuals may make gifts to these meritorious institutions.

Reece ignored this aspect and only focused on subversive activities. Texas liberal populist Democrat Wright Patman later took up the report's particular suggestion in the 1960s as chairman of the Select Committee on Small Business, also known as the Patman Committee.

==== Reece Committee ====
Reece led the House Select Committee to Investigate Tax-Exempt Foundations and Comparable Organizations which investigated the use of funds by tax-exempt non-profit organizations, and in particular foundations, to determine if they were using their funds to support communism in educational institutions. Reece selected attorney Norman Dodd to lead the investigation, which lasted eighteen months. Reece would later declare that "The evidence that has been gathered by the staff pointed to one simple underlying situation, namely that the major foundations, by subsidizing collectivistic-minded educators, had financed a socialist trend in American government."

== Death and legacy ==
Reece died of lung cancer on March 19, 1961, in Bethesda, Maryland, just two months after being sworn in for his 18th term. He served in the House longer than anyone else in Tennessee history (though Jimmy Quillen, who eventually succeeded him as the 1st District's congressman, holds the record for the longest unbroken tenure in the House for a Tennessee congressman), and only Kenneth McKellar served in both houses longer. Reece's wife, Louise, was elected to serve the remainder of his unexpired term in Congress. Both are buried at Monte Vista Memorial Park in Johnson City, Tennessee.

He received several honorary degrees, including LL.D.s from Cumberland University and Tusculum College, and an L.H.D. from Lincoln Memorial University.

== See also ==
- List of members of the United States Congress who died in office (1950–1999)

U.S. House of Representatives
Preceded by Sam R. Sells	Member of the U.S. House of Representatives from Tennessee's 1st congressional district 1921–1931	Succeeded by Oscar Lovette
Preceded by Oscar Lovette	Member of the U.S. House of Representatives from Tennessee's 1st congressional district 1933–1947	Succeeded by Dayton E. Phillips
Preceded by Dayton E. Phillips	Member of the U.S. House of Representatives from Tennessee's 1st congressional district 1951–1961	Succeeded by Louise Goff Reece
Preceded by Wayne Hays; Acting	Chair of the House Tax-Exempt Investigation Committee; 1953–1954	Position abolished
Party political offices
Preceded by Herbert Brownell Jr.	Chair of the Republican National Committee; 1946–1948	Succeeded by Hugh Scott
Preceded by Todd Meacham	Republican nominee for U.S. Senator from Tennessee (Class 3); 1948	Succeeded by Tom Wall
