= Oscar Lovette =

American politician

Oscar Byrd Lovette

Member of the U.S. House of Representatives from Tennessee's 1st district
- In office March 4, 1931 – March 3, 1933
- Preceded by: B. Carroll Reece
- Succeeded by: B. Carroll Reece

Member of the Tennessee House of Representatives
- In office 1895-1897

Personal details
- Born: December 20, 1871 Greeneville, Tennessee, United States
- Died: July 6, 1934 (aged 62)
- Party: Republican
- Spouse: Lillie Fowler Lovette
- Children: Leland P Lovette
- Education: Tusculum College Vanderbilt University
- Profession: Attorney; politician; banker

Oscar Byrd Lovette (December 20, 1871 – July 6, 1934) was a United States representative from Tennessee.

== Biography ==
Lovette was born in Greeneville, Tennessee and graduated from Parrottsville High School, and, in 1893, graduated from Tusculum College. He married Lillie Fowler on December 23, 1897, and they had four children.

== Career ==
In 1894 Lovette was elected to the Tennessee House of Representatives, serving from 1895 to 1897. During this period he studied law at Vanderbilt University in Nashville, and was admitted to the bar in 1896. A Republican, he was elected District Attorney for the former 1st Judicial District in his native East Tennessee in 1918, serving until 1926. He was also engaged in banking, serving as president of Citizens Savings Bank of Greenville from 1912 to 1918. He served as a trustee of Tusculum College; and was Clerk in the Quartermaster department of the United States Army, in Cuba during Spanish–American War.

In 1930, Lovette ran as an Independent for United States Representative from the 1st Congressional District against incumbent Carroll Reece and defeated him. He served in the 72nd Congress from March 4, 1931 to March 3, 1933. However, in 1932 Reece again sought the Republican nomination for his former seat and defeated Lovette, who had attempted to return to Congress as a Republican. Lovette contested the November election as an Independent, a practice then permissible under Tennessee law, but this time Reece turned back Lovette's Independent candidacy. Lovette then resumed practicing law until his death.

== Death ==
Lovette died in Greeneville, Greene County, Tennessee on July 6, 1934 (age 62 years, 198 days). He is interred at Oak Grove Cemetery, Greeneville, Tennessee.
