= Jimmy Quillen =

American politician from Tennessee (1916–2003)

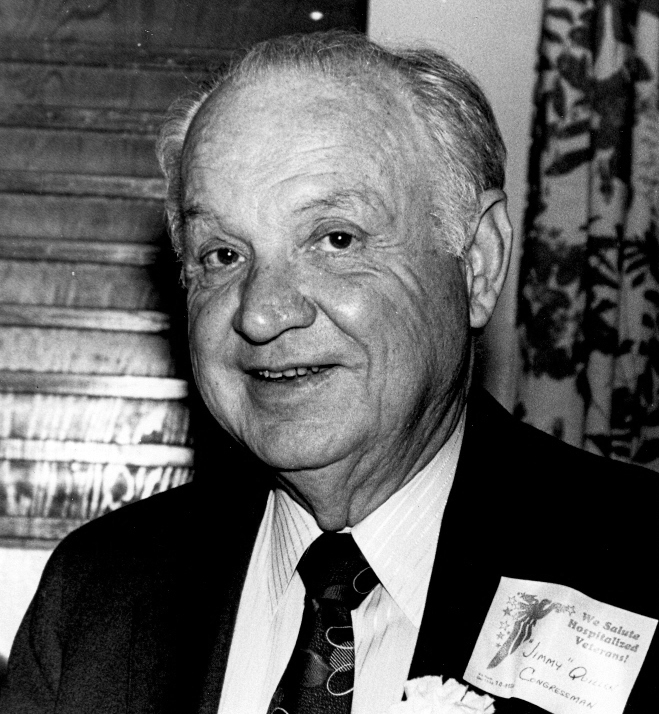
- Quillen in 1992

Member of the U.S. House of Representatives from Tennessee's 1st district
- In office January 3, 1963 – January 3, 1997
- Preceded by: Louise Goff Reece
- Succeeded by: Bill Jenkins

Personal details
- Born: January 11, 1916 Scott County, Virginia, U.S.
- Died: November 2, 2003 (aged 87) Kingsport, Tennessee, U.S.
- Resting place: Oak Hill Cemetery; Kingsport, Tennessee
- Party: Republican
- Spouse: Cecile Quillen

Military service
- Branch/service: United States Navy
- Years of service: 1942–1946
- Rank: Lieutenant
- Battles/wars: World War II
- Jimmy Quillen's voice Quillen speaks in support of the rule for debate of the Comprehensive Crime Control Act of 1984; Recorded September 25, 1984

James Henry Quillen (January 11, 1916 – November 2, 2003) was an American politician who served as a Republican member of the United States House of Representatives from Tennessee from 1963 to 1997. Quillen represented the 1st congressional district, which covers the northeast corner of the state, including the Tri-Cities region.

== Early life ==
Quillen was born in Scott County, Virginia, the fifth of ten children, son of John A. and Hannah Quillen, near the Tennessee line and was later a 1934 graduate of Dobyns-Bennett High School in Kingsport, Tennessee. Quillen worked as a restaurant kitchen prep worker, a grocery store clerk, a copy boy, and later as a young adult, an advertising salesman for a Kingsport newspaper.

During 1936, Quillen invested his own personal savings of $42 to become the publisher and owner of The Kingsport Mirror, a weekly newspaper that he started in Kingsport, Tennessee. Quillen sold The Kingsport Mirror during 1939 and moved to Johnson City, Tennessee (where he resided at the Montrose Court Apartments) to start up another weekly newspaper, The Johnson City Times.

== Draft exemption and military service ==
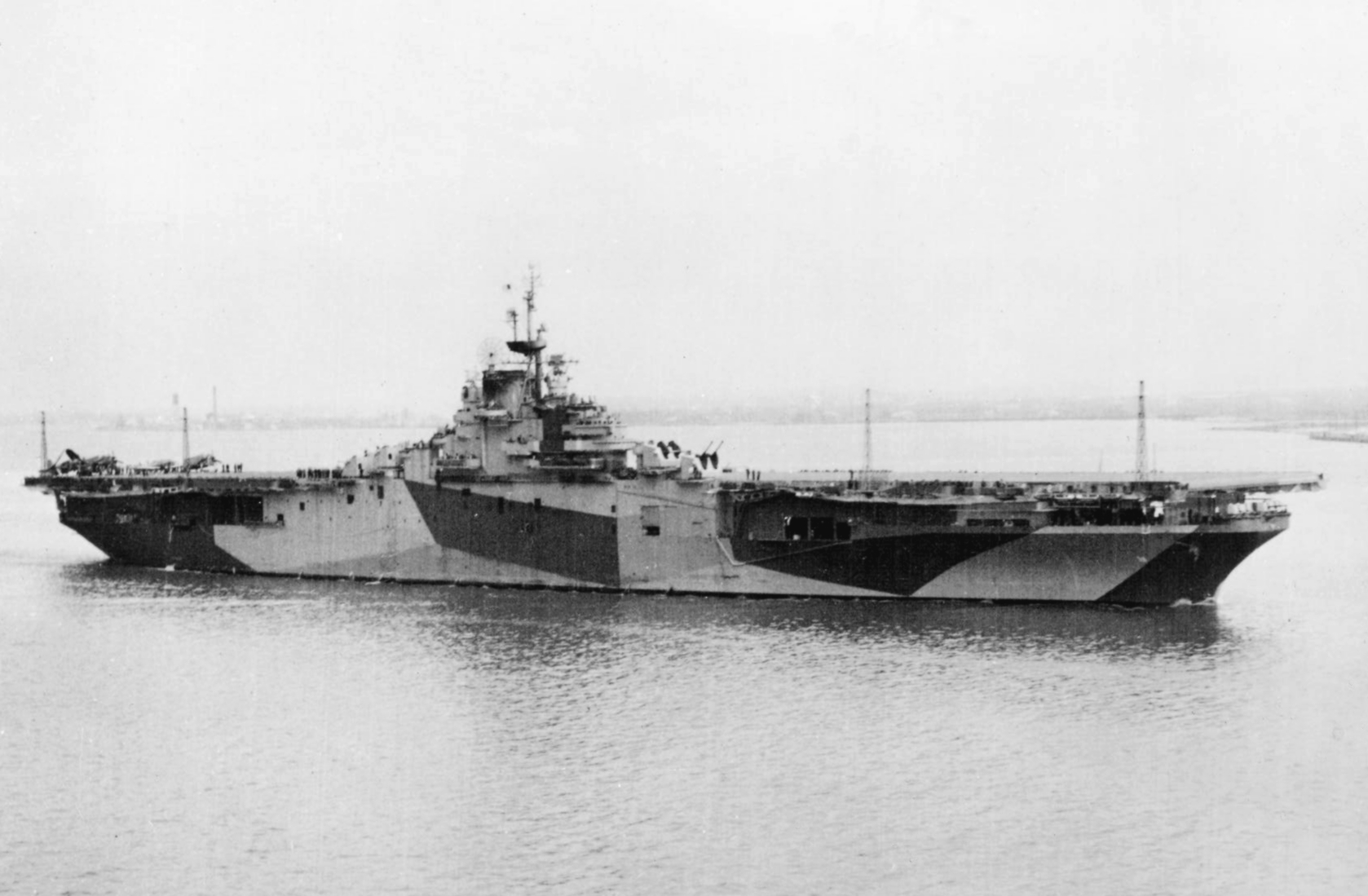
The U.S. Navy aircraft carrier USS Antietam (CV-36)

Prior to the U.S. entry into World War II, Quillen received a two-year Selective Service System Class 3-A draft deferment beginning in December 1940 through late November 1942. Quillen later served in the United States Navy as a public information officer from late 1942 to 1946.

Quillen received his overseas orders in late 1944, with his assignment aboard the Ticonderoga class aircraft carrier USS Antietam (CV-36).

The USS Antietam entered the Pacific theater of operations too late in the war to participate in combat, as the carrier arrived in Hawaii from the Panama Canal just as the first atomic bomb was dropped by the United States on Japan.

== Entry into state and party politics ==
Eventually becoming a Kingsport and Johnson City based real estate development and insurance company owner (starting Kingsport Development Company, Inc.), and bank executive following World War II, Quillen also was elected as a Republican member of the Tennessee House of Representatives in 1954, serving four terms from a district in Sullivan County.

Quillen was later selected as a Tennessee delegate to the Republican National Convention in 1956, 1964, and 1968.

== Elected into the U.S. Congress ==
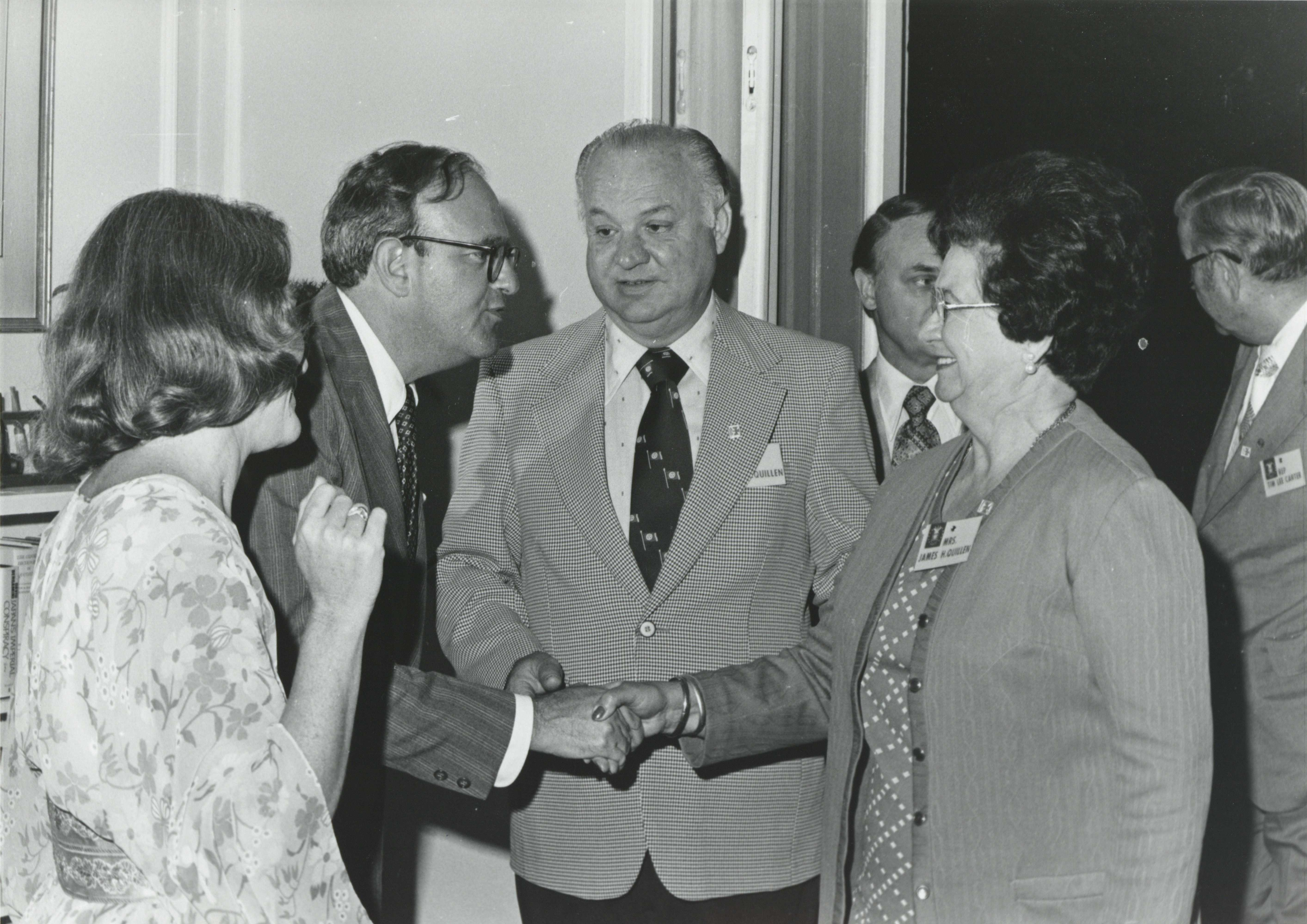
Quillen (middle) with his wife (right) during a 1975 congressional trip to Eastern Europe.

During 1961, B. Carroll Reece, who had represented Tennessee's 1st congressional district for all but six of the last 40 years, died in office. His wife, Louise, took over as a caretaker until the next election. Quillen decided not to run for a fifth term in the state house in 1962, instead seeking the Republican nomination for the 1st District. This region was one of the few ancestrally Republican regions of the South; its voters had identified with the Republicans after the Civil War and had remained staunchly Republican ever since; indeed, Reece was one of the few truly senior Republican congressmen elected from a Southern state before the 1950s.

Quillen won a five-way Republican primary with only 28 percent of the vote, and won the general election with 53.8 percent of the vote. He was reelected 16 more times. Apart from his initial run for the seat, he only faced one relatively close contest, when he was held to 57 percent of the vote in 1976. The 1962 and 1976 contests were the only times that Quillen dropped below 64 percent of the vote and are the only times since 1898 that a Democrat has even managed 40 percent of the vote in this district. Quillen faced no major-party opposition in 1966 and 1980, and was completely unopposed in 1984 and 1990. Quillen eventually became de facto leader of the Republican Party in East Tennessee, and thus a statewide power broker within the tight circle of Tennessee Republican politics.

Quillen's popularity was not due only to his district's heavy Republican tilt, but also because he was widely perceived as maintaining Reece's focus on strong constituent service. However, during his 34 years in Congress, Quillen managed to sponsor only three pieces of original federal legislation (including his legislation pertaining to the social security "notch babies" benefit adjustment and an anti-flag desecration amendment to the U.S. Constitution).

=== Social security "notch babies" ===
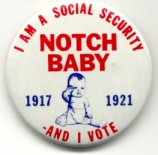
Notch baby button.

First surfacing as a federal legislative issue after the U.S. Congress decided to automatically link social security benefit increases to the consumer price index beginning in 1972, a cohort of social security retirees born during the period of 1910 through 1916 received undue windfall of payments from the federal taxpayers through the Social Security Administration miscalculating social security benefits based upon the 1910–1916 cohort. Social security retirees born immediately afterwards during the so-called "notch" period running approximately from 1917 to 1921–such as Quillen's wife Cecile–perceived agency mistreatment and petitioned members of Congress for a similar upward and unwarranted windfall adjustment for payments to their own social security benefits.

Quillen amassed a large campaign treasury due to having received many large individual and PAC contributions, including those well financed PACs representing the beer, wine, and spirits beverage industries. Another important fact buttressing Quillen's re-election campaign finance efforts, according to Vin Weber of the Brookings Institution, was the Northeast Tennessee congressman's "...tremendous success...in shaking down the business community for [campaign] contributions." However, he never had to use much of this fund due to his district's heavy Republican bent.

=== Quillen twice voted against the Civil Rights Act of 1964 ===
Quillen voted twice against the enactment of the Civil Rights Act of 1964 (Pub. L. 88–352, 78 Stat. 241, enacted July 2, 1964) is a landmark civil rights and US labor law in the United States that outlaws discrimination based on race, color, religion, sex, or national origin. It ended unequal application of voter registration requirements and racial segregation in schools, at the workplace and by facilities that served the general public (known as "public accommodations").

Quillen first voted against the Civil Rights Act of 1964 on February 10, 1964, and again on July 2, 1964, when the bill came back to the U.S. House of Representatives for a final vote with an amendment attached to the original bill by the U.S. Senate. Congress asserted its authority to legislate under several different parts of the United States Constitution, principally its power to regulate interstate commerce under Article One (section 8), its duty to guarantee all citizens equal protection of the laws under the Fourteenth Amendment, and its duty to protect voting rights under the Fifteenth Amendment. The final version of Civil Rights Act of 1964 was signed into law later on that same day by President Lyndon B. Johnson on July 2, 1964, at the White House.

=== Quillen votes for passage of S3, the Appalachian Regional Development Act of 1965 ===
S 3. Passage of the Appalachian Regional Development Act of 1965 authorizing $1,092,400,000 for road construction, health facilities, vocational schools, housing, sewage works, land improvement and other activities to aid the 11-state Appalachian region. Passed 257-165: R 25-109; D232-56 (ND173-15;SD 59-41), March 3, 1965. A “yea” was a vote supporting President Johnson’s position.

=== Quillen votes against passage of HR 2362, the Secondary Education Act of 1965 ===
HR 2362. Passage of the and Secondary Education Act of 1965, providing: providing: a three-year program of grants to states for allocation to school districts with large numbers of children from low-income families; grants for purchase of books and library materials; funds to improve educational research; and grants to strengthen state departments of education. Passed 263-153: R 35-96; D 228-57 (ND 187-3; SD 41-54), March 26, 1965. A “yea” was a vote supporting the President Johnson’s position.

=== Quillen votes against passage of the HR 6675, the Social Security Amendments of 1965 (Medicare Insurance Program) ===
HR 6675. Passage of the Social Security Amendments of 1965 to: provide a basic compulsory health insurance program for the aged, financed primarily by a payroll tax; a supplementary voluntary health insurance program financed by general revenue and contributions from participants; increases in Social Security cash benefits; and expansion of the Kerr-Mills health program, child health-care programs and other federal-state public assistance programs. Passed 313-115: R 65-73; D 248-42 (ND 189-2; SD 59-40), April 8, 1965. A ”yea” was a vote supporting President Johnson’s position.

=== Quillen votes for passage of the H J Res 1, Presidential Continuity ===
H J Res 1. Passage of the bill proposing a constitutional amendment to permit the Vice President to become Acting President if the President were unable to perform his duties, and to provide for filling a vacancy in the office of Vice President. Passed (two-thirds majority required) 368-29: R 122-8; D 246-21 (ND 172-6; SD 74-15), April 13, 1965. A “yea” was a vote supporting President Johnson’s position.

=== Quillen introduces amendment to the Teague-Cranston Act ===
In April 1971, U.S. Representative Olin Teague of Texas introduced a bill to create five medical schools in conjunction with established VA hospitals and U.S. Senator Alan Cranston of California introduced a companion bill within the U.S. Senate. Known as the Teague-Cranston Act, the federal legislative proposal called for the creation of five new medical schools in five states to meet the needs of the medically underserved areas of the country.

Quillen frequently reported to Tennessee news media that he himself had introduced an amendment to the Teague-Cranston Act legislation which required that any university to be considered for acceptance into this pilot program must be on government property contiguous and adjacent to a VA hospital, as East Tennessee State University was adjacent to the Mountain Home VA Hospital. However, the October 4, 1993, edition of the Kingsport Times-News released an investigative report entitled "Story of ETSU medical school's founding not always in agreement with facts" documented several facts pertaining to the Teague-Cranston Act that disputed Quillen's district claim of his amendment sponsorship:

- one of the Teague-Cranston Act medical schools "was established at Texas A&M" within the district of U.S. Rep. Olin Teague and located about seventy miles away from the nearest Veterans Administration hospital;
- Quillen only become a signatory sponsor two months after Teague had introduced the original bill specifying the creation of medical colleges in medically under served areas of the United States;
- the Teague-Cranston Act was never in any danger of failing within the U.S. House of Representatives, and the legislation had actually been passed in the House by an overwhelming margin. and;
- a memo from the Nixon Administration indicates that Nixon signed the bill "... primarily as an election-year gesture toward veterans."

The Teague-Cranston Act passed without a dissenting vote in October 1972, and was signed by U.S. President Richard Nixon.

=== Renaming of ETSU Quillen-Dishner College of Medicine ===
While serving as Governor of Tennessee, fellow Republican Winfield Dunn incurred Quillen's wrath by vetoing a bill establishing a medical school at East Tennessee State University. Dunn claimed that Tennessee lacked the resources to adequately staff and fund two first-rate medical schools and that more resources should instead be devoted to the existing medical school in Memphis, which was approximately 500 miles from Quillen's district.

One reason for Quillen's anger may have been that Dunn was from Memphis himself, and perhaps Quillen felt that Dunn was showing too much favoritism to his hometown. There has been considerable acrimony between East Tennessee and the state's other grand divisions dating back to settlement times. Whatever the case, Quillen never forgave Dunn, and it came back to haunt Dunn when he ran for governor again in 1986. Quillen made it known in East Tennessee Republican circles that Dunn was not to be supported. Dunn managed to overcome Quillen's opposition and won the nomination. However, without significant support in East Tennessee, Dunn stood almost no chance against the popular Democratic State House Speaker, Ned McWherter. Only a large turnout in his former Memphis base kept the margin of defeat to under nine points.

The ETSU medical school was subsequently built anyway after the legislature overrode Dunn's veto, and opened as the ETSU Quillen-Dishner College of Medicine. The name of one of the school's early benefactors and teachers, Paul Dishner, was later removed in the wake of a "homosexual sex scandal", and is now officially known as the East Tennessee State University James H. Quillen College of Medicine.

=== Quillen's Kingsport Development Co. ===
In 1972, a public interest task force led by Ralph Nader pointed a very public finger at Rep. Quillen, accusing the congressman of using his elected office to "...promote his business interests, specifically insurance sales through Kingsport Development Co., Inc.", a Kingsport-based real estate and insurance agency owned by Quillen.

=== USPS recall of 1980 Olympic postage stamps ===
In 1980, UPI Washington syndicated news reported that the United States Postal Service was "...investigating whether Rep. James H. Quillen, R-Tenn. illegally purchased hundreds of commemorative Olympic postage stamps after they were recalled" after the "stamps were ordered recalled last March 11 because of the U.S. boycott of the summer games in Moscow, and those stamps had been previously sold became collectors' items." A USPS spokesman said that postal inspectors were looking into whether Quillen had purchased the stamps before or after the recall order.

=== Savings and Loan "supervisory goodwill" ===
In 1989, Quillen (also a banker) worked against pending legislation for the savings and loan industry that would prohibit S&Ls from carrying "supervisory goodwill"—a form of phantom capital to count toward their capital requirements" for accounting and regulatory reports.

=== Passed over for Rules Committee chairmanship ===
Quillen's fellow Republicans passed him over in 1990 for consideration as ranking Republican on the House Rules Committee in favor of Gerald Solomon of New York, even though Quillen was the committee's most senior member. An unnamed fellow committee member was once quoted by the Kingsport Times-News (October 4, 1992) as saying, "Jimmy's one helluva nice guy, ... but let's face it. He couldn't organize a one-car funeral." He thus lost a chance to become the committee's chairman when the Republicans later gained control of Congress after the 1994 elections—thus making him one of the longest-serving congressmen to have never chaired a committee.

=== Rebuking 1992 presidential candidate Clinton as a "draft dodger" ===
The October 25, 1992, edition of the Johnson City Press reported that both Quillen and former U.S. Senator Howard Baker, while campaigning in Jonesborough on their Bush/Quayle/Quillen Victory Bus tour, attacked the character of U.S. Democratic presidential candidate Bill Clinton, with Quillen telling the assembled crowd, "We don't want a draft dodger as President of the United States". Quillen also referred to the 1992 elections as "a national crisis". Quillen had himself avoided conscription into military service during the early 1940s, but later served in the U.S. Navy from late 1942 to 1946.

=== Orlando Sentinel Congressional "baseball hitting percentages" ===
In 1993, a study first featured within the Orlando Sentinel used a baseball hitting percentages statistical analogy to rate the effectiveness of members of the U.S. Congress, listed Quillen with a .000 average.

=== Support of NAFTA and GATT ===
Quillen voted for approval of the 1994 modifications to the General Agreement on Tariffs and Trade (GATT) and approval of the North American Free Trade Agreement.

== Retirement ==
Quillen did decide to retire prior to the 1996 election and was succeeded by circuit court judge Bill Jenkins, a fellow Republican.

Quillen holds the record for the longest unbroken tenure of a Tennessean within the U.S. House of Representatives. Only Reece had been elected to more terms in the House (18 terms to Quillen's 17), and only Kenneth McKellar had served in both chambers longer.

After retiring, Quillen was inducted as an honorary member of the East Tennessee State University chapter of Tau Kappa Epsilon fraternity.

Quillen died on November 2, 2003, and was buried at Oak Hill Cemetery in Kingsport.

Quillen's estate was valued at approximately $17 million, with the majority going to schools in his district. King College, Milligan College, Carson-Newman College, and Tusculum College each received $250,000 for scholarships. East Tennessee State University received an estimated $14.6 million for two scholarship endowments, including one for students of James H. Quillen College of Medicine.

The East Tennessee State University Charles C. Sherrod Library also maintains the "Quillen Congressional Office and Gallery" on the fourth floor of the building, serving as a memorabilia shrine with an exact size replica of longtime U.S. Congressional Representative James H. Quillen's former Washington, D.C., office within the U.S. House of Representatives.

The Tennessee General Assembly designated U.S. Route 23 as "James H. Quillen Parkway" in 1989. During his tenure, Quillen worked to appropriate federal funds for upgrading the road to a four-lane controlled-access highway.

U.S. House of Representatives
Preceded by Louise Goff Reece	Member of the U.S. House of Representatives from Tennessee's 1st congressional district 1963–1997	Succeeded by Bill Jenkins
Preceded by David Martin	Ranking Member of the House Rules Committee; 1975–1991	Succeeded by Gerald Solomon
