= Maston E. O'Neal Jr. =

American politician (1907–1990)

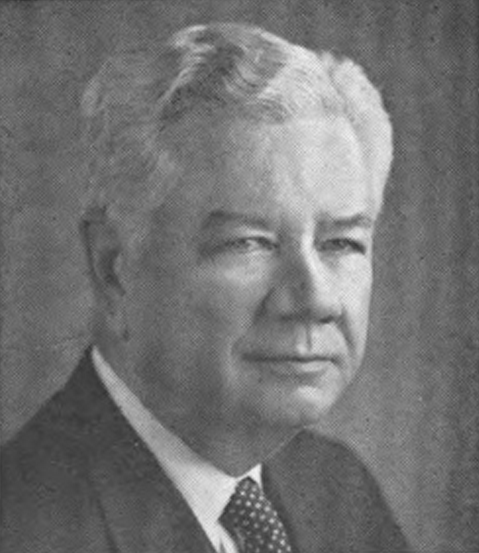

Member of the U.S. House of Representatives from Georgia's 2nd district
- In office January 3, 1965 – January 3, 1971
- Preceded by: J.L. Pilcher
- Succeeded by: Dawson Mathis

Personal details
- Born: Maston Emmett O'Neal Jr. July 19, 1907 Bainbridge, Georgia, U.S.
- Died: January 9, 1990 (aged 82) Bainbridge, Georgia, U.S.
- Party: Democratic Party
- Education: Davidson College, Emory University

Maston Emmett O'Neal Jr. (July 19, 1907 – January 9, 1990) was a U.S. representative from Georgia.

== Biography ==
Born in Bainbridge, Georgia, O'Neal attended the public schools and Marion Military Institute. He graduated from Davidson College with a Bachelor's degree in 1927. Next he attended Lamar School of Law at Emory University; he served as the principal of Shellman High School from 1927 to 1928. He was admitted to practice law in the Albany circuit on January 16, 1930.

O'Neal was the solicitor general of the Albany Judicial Circuit from January 1, 1941, to May 1, 1964. (He was reelected five times to four-year terms without opposition, including one term in absentia while in naval service.) He served as lieutenant in the United States Naval Reserve (Amphibs) in the Pacific Theater of World War II from 1944 to 1946. He was the first president of the Solicitors General Association of Georgia, and the former director of the National Association of County and Prosecuting Attorneys.

O'Neal was elected as a Democrat to the Eighty-ninth, Ninetieth, and Ninety-first Congresses (January 3, 1965 – January 3, 1971). He was not a candidate for reelection in 1970 to the Ninety-second Congress.

He was a resident of Bainbridge until his death there in 1990.

U.S. House of Representatives
Preceded by J. L. Pilcher	Member of the U.S. House of Representatives from Georgia's 2nd congressional district January 3, 1965 – January 2, 1971	Succeeded by Dawson Mathis
