= Dayton E. Phillips =

American politician

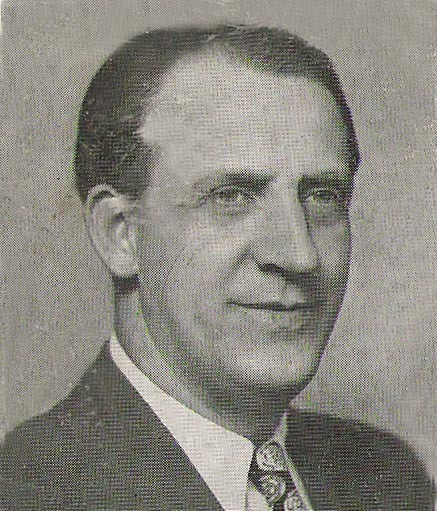

Member of the U.S. House of Representatives from Tennessee's 1st district
- In office January 3, 1947 – January 3, 1951
- Preceded by: B. Carroll Reece
- Succeeded by: B. Carroll Reece

Personal details
- Born: March 29, 1910 Carter County, Tennessee
- Died: October 23, 1980 (aged 70) Kingsport, Tennessee
- Citizenship: United States
- Party: Republican
- Education: Milligan College; University of Tennessee; National University Law School
- Profession: Attorney; politician

Military service
- Allegiance: United States of America
- Branch/service: United States Army
- Years of service: 1943 to 1945
- Battles/wars: World War II

Dayton E. Phillips (March 29, 1910 – October 23, 1980) was an American politician and a member of the United States House of Representatives for the 1st congressional district of Tennessee.

== Biography ==
Born, Dayton Edward Phillips, on March 29, 1910, at Shell Creek, Tennessee in Carter County, he grew up on a farm, attended the country school, and went to Cloudland High School in Roan Mountain, Tennessee. From 1929 to 1931, he attended Milligan College in Tennessee. He attended the University of Tennessee at Knoxville and graduated with a Bachelor of Laws degree in 1934. He taught school in Carter County, Tennessee in 1931 and 1932.

== Career ==
Phillips was admitted to the bar in 1935 and commenced practice in Elizabethton, Tennessee, and graduated from National University Law School in Washington, D.C., with a J.D. in 1936. He was the attorney for Carter County from 1938 to 1942. He was district attorney general of the first judicial circuit of Tennessee from 1942 to 1947. During World War II, he served as an enlisted man in the United States Army, with overseas service in the European Theater of Operations, from 1943 to 1945.

When twelve-term representative and head Tennessee Republican Carroll Reece gave up his House seat in 1946 to become chair of the national Republican Party, Phillips won the Republican primary with the Reece organization not clearly backing one of the three candidates. There was no Democratic opponent in November. Reece, still in the party chairship, backed a primary opponent to Phillips in 1948, who won a highly contested renomination with 51%. Reece himself was back in 1950 in another bitter battle and reclaimed the nomination by five points. Phillips then ran in the general election as an independent, defeating the Democrat but trailing Reece by 18 points. Phillips resumed his law practice. After Reece died in 1961 and his widow, who filled the unexpired term, declined to run in 1962, Phillips announced. Presumably his apostasy in 1950 helped hold him to fourth place in the five-person Republican primary.

Phillips served in the House from January 3, 1947, to January 3, 1951. His floor participation was low, but he was successful with three public bills, dealing with veterans, the blind, and a local matter.

Phillips served as elected chancellor of the First Chancery Court of Tennessee from 1952-80. He resided in Elizabethton, Tennessee.

== Death ==
Phillips died on October 23, 1980, in Kingsport, Tennessee. He is interred at Happy Valley Memorial Park, Elizabethton, Tennessee.

Political offices
Preceded by B. Carroll Reece	Member of the U.S. House of Representatives from Tennessee's 1st congressional district 1947–1951	Succeeded by B. Carroll Reece
