= Norman Dodd =

American banker

Norman Paul Dodd (June 29, 1899 – January 24, 1987) was an American banker and bank manager, who worked as a financial advisor and served as chief investigator in 1953 for the Special Committee on Tax Exempt Foundations (commonly referred to as the Reece Committee), which was chaired by U.S. Congressman B. Carroll Reece. Dodd was known primarily for his controversial investigation into tax-exempt foundations.

Norman Dodd was interviewed shortly before he died by the conspiracy theorist G. Edward Griffin, and an interview documentary was produced as a result, which has gained a very wide audience in later years.

== Early life ==
Norman was born in South Orange, Essex County, New Jersey. His parents were Charles Spier Dodd (January 23, 1874 – July 25, 1932), who was an insurance agent, and Florence Augusta Cummings (July 18, 1872 – December 7, 1948). Norman's wife was Louise Richardson (July 19, 1901 – March 9, 1987). Norman attended private schools including Phillips Academy, finishing in 1918 and later graduated from Yale University.

He worked in manufacturing before devoting himself to banking. During or after the 1929 stock market crash he was assigned by his superiors the task of restructuring the bank he was working at, after a period of which he recommended what at the time was referred to as "sound banking". He was told by his superiors that his recommendations would not be implemented because "we will never see sound banking in the United States again".

== Tax-exempt foundations ==
Dodd's claims about his investigative work have become the cornerstone of theories implicating the Carnegie Endowment for International Peace, Ford Foundation, and the Rockefeller Foundation, among others. He stated in his findings that many foundations were intentionally campaigning to involve the United States in such wars as World War I and that they also sought ways to warp American teaching of history through explicit control of the education system in the United States.

Rene Wormser, the legal counsel to the Reece Committee, wrote in his 1958 book on the subject, "It is difficult for the public to understand that some of the great foundations which have done so much for us in some fields have acted tragically against the public interest in others, but the facts are there for the unprejudiced to recognize."

The Norman Dodd Collection at the Rosalind Kress Haley Library contains books from Norman Dodd's personal library.

Norman and his wife Louise are both buried in Christ Episcopal Church Cemetery in Keene, Albemarle County, Virginia.
