= List of United States senators in the 87th Congress =

This is a complete list of United States senators during the 87th United States Congress listed by seniority from January 3, 1961, to January 3, 1963.

Order of service is based on the commencement of the senator's first term. Behind this is former service as a senator (only giving the senator seniority within their new incoming class), service as vice president, a House member, a cabinet secretary, or a governor of a state. The final factor is the population of the senator's state.

In this congress, J. William Fulbright (D-Arkansas) was the most senior junior senator and Oren E. Long (D-Hawaii) was the most junior senior senator.

Senators who were sworn in during the middle of the two-year congressional term (up until the last senator who was not sworn in early after winning the November 1962 election) are listed at the end of the list with no number.

== Terms of service ==
Class	Terms of service of senators that expired in years
Class 3	Terms of service of senators that expired in 1963 (AK, AL, AR, AZ, CA, CO, CT, FL, GA, HI, IA, ID, IL, IN, KS, KY, LA, MD, MO, NC, ND, NH, NV, NY, OH, OK, OR, PA, SC, SD, UT, VT, WA, and WI.)
Class 1	Terms of service of senators that expired in 1965 (AZ, CA, CT, DE, FL, HI, IN, MA, MD, ME, MI, MN, MO, MS, MT, ND, NE, NJ, NM, NV, NY, OH, PA, RI, TN, TX, UT, VA, VT, WA, WI, WV, and WY.)
Class 2	Terms of service of senators that expired in 1967 (AK, AL, AR, CO, DE, GA, IA, ID, IL, KS, KY, LA, MA, ME, MI, MN, MS, MT, NC, NE, NH, NJ, NM, OK, OR, RI, SC, SD, TN, TX, VA, WV, and WY.)

== U.S. Senate seniority list ==
U.S. Senate seniority
Rank	Senator (party-state)	Seniority date	Other factors
1	Carl Hayden (D-AZ)	March 4, 1927	
2	Richard Russell, Jr. (D-GA)	January 12, 1933	
3	Harry F. Byrd, Sr. (D-VA)	March 4, 1933	
4	Dennis Chavez (D-NM)	May 11, 1935	
5	Styles Bridges (R-NH)	January 3, 1937	Former governor
6	Allen J. Ellender (D-LA)	January 3, 1937	
7	Joseph L. Hill (D-AL)	January 11, 1938	
8	Alexander Wiley (R-WI)	January 3, 1939	
9	George Aiken (R-VT)	January 10, 1941	
10	James Eastland (D-MS)	January 3, 1943	Previously a senator
11	John Little McClellan (D-AR)	January 3, 1943	
12	Warren G. Magnuson (D-WA)	December 14, 1944	
13	J. William Fulbright (D-AR)	January 3, 1945	Former representative
14	Bourke B. Hickenlooper (R-IA)	January 3, 1945	Former governor, Iowa 20th in population (1940)
15	Olin D. Johnston (D-SC)	January 3, 1945	Former governor, South Carolina 26th in population (1940)
16	Homer E. Capehart (R-IN)	January 3, 1945	Indiana 12th in population (1940)
17	Wayne Morse (D-OR)	January 3, 1945	Oregon 34th in population (1940)
18	Leverett Saltonstall (R-MA)	January 4, 1945	
19	Milton Young (R-ND)	March 12, 1945	
20	Spessard Holland (D-FL)	September 24, 1946	
21	A. Willis Robertson (D-VA)	November 6, 1946	Former representative (13 years, 10 months)
22	John Sparkman (D-AL)	November 6, 1946	Former representative (9 years, 10 months)
23	John J. Williams (R-DE)	January 3, 1947	
24	John C. Stennis (D-MS)	November 17, 1947	
25	Karl Mundt (R-SD)	December 31, 1948	Former representative
26	Russell B. Long (D-LA)	December 31, 1948	
27	Estes Kefauver (D-TN)	January 3, 1949	Former representative (10 years)
28	Margaret Chase Smith (R-ME)	January 3, 1949	Former representative (8 years, 7 months)
29	Clinton Anderson (D-NM)	January 3, 1949	Former representative (4 years, 6 months)
30	Robert S. Kerr (D-OK)	January 3, 1949	Former governor, Oklahoma 22nd in population (1940)
31	Andrew F. Schoeppel (R-KS)	January 3, 1949	Former governor, Kansas 29th in population (1940)
32	Paul Douglas (D-IL)	January 3, 1949	Illinois 3rd in population (1940)
33	Hubert Humphrey (D-MN)	January 3, 1949	Minnesota 18th in population (1940)
34	Henry Dworshak (R-ID)	October 14, 1949	
35	Frank Carlson (R-KS)	November 27, 1950	
36	John O. Pastore (D-RI)	December 19, 1950	
37	Everett Dirksen (R-IL)	January 3, 1951	Former representative (16 years)
38	Francis H. Case (R-SD)	January 3, 1951	Former representative (14 years)
39	Almer Monroney (D-OK)	January 3, 1951	Former representative (12 years)
40	George Smathers (D-FL)	January 3, 1951	Former representative (4 years)
41	John M. Butler (R-MD)	January 3, 1951	Maryland 28th in population (1940)
42	Wallace F. Bennett (R-UT)	January 3, 1951	Utah 40th in population (1940)
43	Prescott Bush (R-CT)	November 5, 1952	
44	Thomas Kuchel (R-CA)	January 2, 1953	
45	Albert Gore, Sr. (D-TN)	January 3, 1953	Former representative (14 years)
46	Henry M. Jackson (D-WA)	January 3, 1953	Former representative (12 years)
47	James Glenn Beall (R-MD)	January 3, 1953	Former representative (10 years), Maryland 28th in population (1950)
48	Mike Mansfield (D-MT)	January 3, 1953	Former representative (10 years), Montana 42nd in population (1950)
49	Stuart Symington (D-MO)	January 3, 1953	Missouri 12th in population (1950)
50	Barry Goldwater (R-AZ)	January 3, 1953	Arizona 37th in population (1950)
51	Sam Ervin (D-NC)	June 5, 1954	
52	Norris Cotton (R-NH)	November 8, 1954	Former representative (7 years, 10 months)
53	Roman Hruska (R-NE)	November 8, 1954	Former representative (1 year, 10 months)
54	Alan Bible (D-NV)	December 2, 1954	
55	Carl Curtis (R-NE)	January 1, 1955	
56	Clifford P. Case (R-NJ)	January 3, 1955	Former representative
57	Patrick V. McNamara (D-MI)	January 3, 1955	Maryland 24th in population (1950)
58	Gordon L. Allott (R-CO)	January 3, 1955	Colorado 32nd in population (1950)
59	John Sherman Cooper (R-KY)	November 7, 1956	Previously a senator (twice) (total tenure 4 years, 4 months)
60	Strom Thurmond (D-SC)	November 7, 1956	Previously a senator (1 year, 3 months)
61	Thruston Ballard Morton (R-KY)	January 3, 1957	Former representative (6 years)
62	John A. Carroll (D-CO)	January 3, 1957	Former representative (4 years)
63	Frank J. Lausche (D-OH)	January 3, 1957	Former governor, Ohio 5th in population (1950)
64	Herman Talmadge (D-GA)	January 3, 1957	Former governor, Georgia 13th in population (1950)
65	Joseph S. Clark (D-PA)	January 3, 1957	Pennsylvania 3rd in population (1950)
66	Frank Church (D-ID)	January 3, 1957	Idaho 43rd in population (1950)
67	Jacob K. Javits (R-NY)	January 9, 1957	
68	Ralph Yarborough (D-TX)	April 29, 1957	
69	William Proxmire (D-WI)	August 28, 1957	
70	Ben Jordan (D-NC)	April 19, 1958	
71	Jennings Randolph (D-WV)	November 5, 1958	
72	Hugh Scott (R-PA)	January 3, 1959	Former representative (18 years)
73	Clair Engle (D-CA)	January 3, 1959	Former representative (15 years, 4 months)
74	Kenneth Keating (R-NY)	January 3, 1959	Former representative (12 years)
75	Eugene McCarthy (D-MN)	January 3, 1959	Former representative (10 years)
76	Stephen Young (D-OH)	January 3, 1959	Former representative (8 years), Ohio 5th in population (1950)
77	Winston L. Prouty (R-VT)	January 3, 1959	Former representative (8 years), Vermont 46th in population (1950)
78	Robert Byrd (D-WV)	January 3, 1959	Former representative (6 years)
79	Harrison A. Williams (D-NJ)	January 3, 1959	Former representative (4 years), New Jersey 8th in population (1950)
80	Thomas J. Dodd (D-CT)	January 3, 1959	Former representative (4 years), Connecticut 34th in population (1950)
81	Edward L. Bartlett (D-AK)	January 3, 1959	Former delegate
82	Edmund Muskie (D-ME)	January 3, 1959	Former governor, Maine 35th in population (1950)
83	Ernest Gruening (D-AK)	January 3, 1959	Former Territorial Governor, Alaska 50th in population (1950)
84	Philip Hart (D-MI)	January 3, 1959	Michigan 7th in population (1950)
85	Vance Hartke (D-IN)	January 3, 1959	Indiana 11th in population (1950)
86	Frank Moss (D-UT)	January 3, 1959	Utah 38th in population (1950)
87	Gale W. McGee (D-WY)	January 3, 1959	Wyoming 48th in population (1950)
88	Howard Cannon (D-NV)	January 3, 1959	Nevada 49th in population (1950)
89	Oren E. Long (D-HI)	August 21, 1959	Former Territorial Governor
90	Hiram Fong (R-HI)	August 21, 1959	
91	Quentin Northrup Burdick (D-ND)	August 8, 1960	
92	Edward V. Long (D-MO)	September 23, 1960	
93	Maurine Neuberger (D-OR)	November 9, 1960	
94	Benjamin A. Smith II (D-MA)	December 27, 1960	
95	William A. Blakley (D-TX)	January 3, 1961	Previously a senator
96	Lee Metcalf (D-MT)	January 3, 1961	Former representative (8 years)
97	James Boggs (R-DE)	January 3, 1961	Former representative (6 years)
98	John J. Hickey (D-WY)	January 3, 1961	Former governor
99	Jack Miller (R-IA)	January 3, 1961	Iowa 22nd in population (1950)
100	Claiborne Pell (D-RI)	January 3, 1961	Rhode Island 36th in population (1950)
	John Tower (R-TX)	June 15, 1961	
	Maurice J. Murphy, Jr. (R-NH)	January 10, 1962	
	James B. Pearson (R-KS)	January 31, 1962	
	Joseph H. Bottum (R-SD)	July 9, 1962	
	Len Jordan (R-ID)	August 6, 1962	
	Milward L. Simpson (R-WY)	November 7, 1962	Former governor
	Ted Kennedy (D-MA)	November 7, 1962	Massachusetts 9th in population (1960)
	Thomas J. McIntyre (D-NH)	November 7, 1962	New Hampshire 45th in population (1960)
	Edwin L. Mechem (R-NM)	November 30, 1962	

The most senior senators by class were Harry F. Byrd Sr. (D-Virginia) from Class 1, Richard Russell Jr. (D-Georgia) from Class 2, and Carl Hayden (D-Arizona) from Class 3.

== See also ==
- 87th United States Congress
- List of United States representatives in the 87th Congress
