= E. Eugene Cox =

American politician (1880–1952)

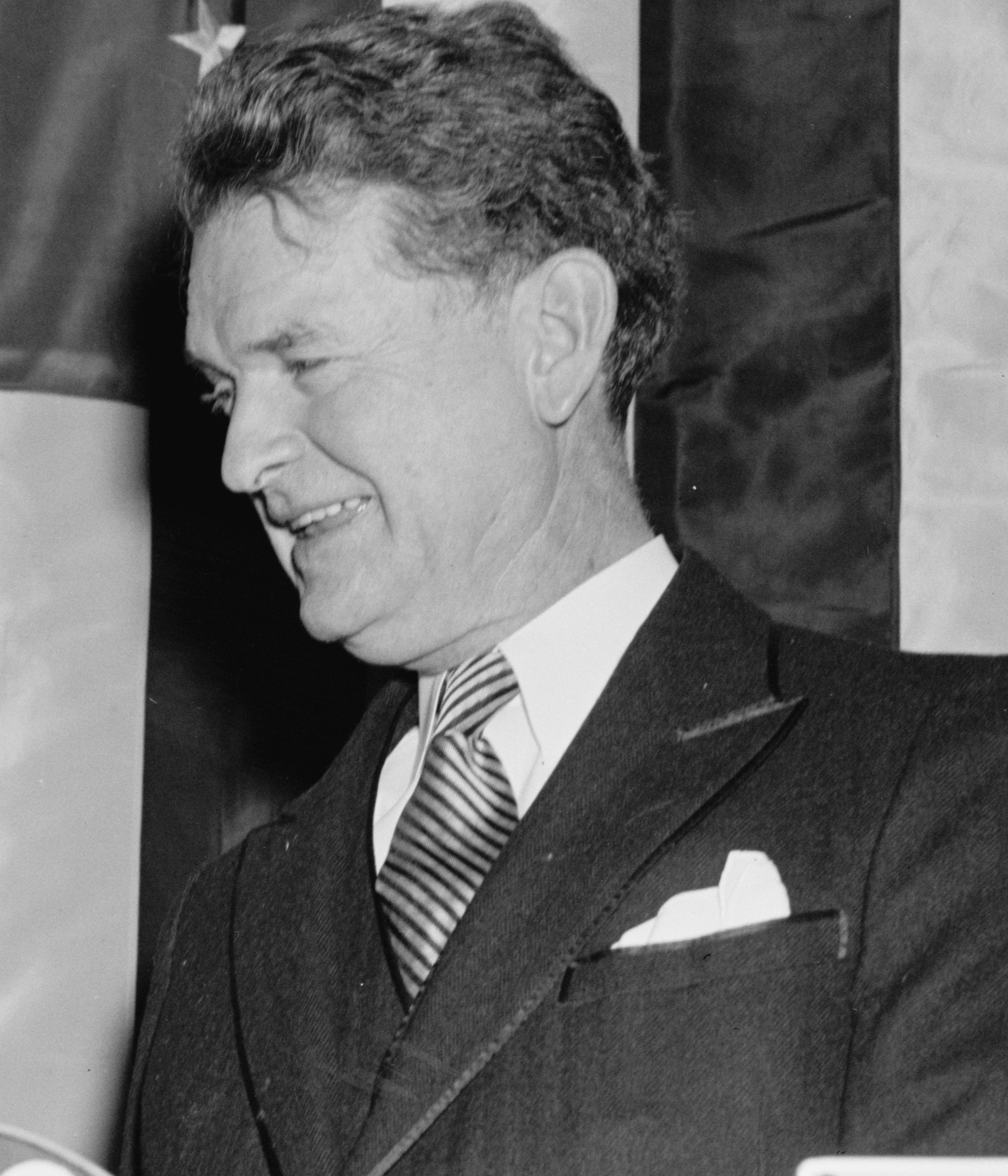

Member of the U.S. House of Representatives from Georgia's 2nd district
- In office March 4, 1925 – December 24, 1952
- Preceded by: Frank Park
- Succeeded by: J. L. Pilcher

Personal details
- Born: Edward Eugene Cox; April 3, 1880 near Camilla, Georgia, U.S.
- Died: December 24, 1952 (aged 72) Bethesda, Maryland, U.S.
- Party: Democratic
- Children: Edward Eugene Cox II
- Education: Mercer University
- Occupation: lawyer

Edward Eugene "Eugene" or "Goober" Cox (April 3, 1880 – December 24, 1952) served as a U.S. representative from Georgia for nearly 28 years. A conservative Democrat who supported racial segregation and opposed President Franklin Roosevelt's "New Deal," Cox became the most senior Democrat on the House Committee on Rules.

Two special investigative committees that he chaired were heavily criticized as result-oriented persecutions of those disliked by Cox. A failed attempt to create another such committee would turn out to have far-reaching consequences. In 1941, with American entry into World War II seeming inevitable, Cox proposed an investigative committee, similar to the Civil War-era Joint Committee on the Conduct of the War, to deal with matters of national defense. When Roosevelt learned of Cox's intentions, he pre-empted them by agreeing to a similar proposal from Missouri Senator Harry Truman. The Truman Committee would come to be seen as a significant asset to the war effort, and its chairman, then a little-known backbencher, would become Roosevelt's Vice President and, after his death in 1945, US President.

== Life and career ==
Born near Camilla, Georgia, Cox attended Camilla High School and Mercer University in Macon, Georgia, before graduating from the law department of that university in 1902. The same year, he was admitted to the bar and commenced practice in Camilla. In 1904, he was elected mayor of Camilla and held the position for two years.

He served as a delegate to the Democratic National Convention in 1908.

Cox was appointed and then elected judge of the superior court of the Albany circuit and served from 1912 until 1916, when he resigned and unsuccessfully challenged the incumbent, Frank Park, for the Democratic nomination to represent Georgia's 2nd congressional district in the 65th Congress. It finally took until 1924 for Cox to win the Democratic nomination from Park and to be elected to the 69th Congress. Once in office, Cox was re-elected 13 times; in all, he served from March 4, 1925, until his death in 1952. Cox died of a heart attack on December 24, 1952, between his victory in the 1952 general election and the start of the 83rd Congress.

Although Cox was a frequent critic of the Roosevelt and Truman administrations, their coattails often provided Democratic majorities in the House that allowed Cox to chair powerful committees, particularly in his later years. He was part of a series of conservative Democrats and Republicans who held the chairmanship of the U.S. House Committee on Rules from 1935 to 1961, which then prevented the passage of civil rights legislation. In 1950, Cox made an unsuccessful attempt to forge a coalition of Dixiecrat Democrats and leaders of the House's Republican minority in support of a bill that would "restore to the House Rules Committee its old power to bury any bill safely in a deep committee pigeonhole."

In 1943, Cox sponsored and chaired a select committee whose mission was to investigate the Federal Communications Commission (FCC). Cox clashed strongly with FCC Chairman James Lawrence Fly, who regularly released press statements attacking Cox and the committee. However, it was revealed that shortly before the investigation began, Cox had been paid to represent a private party seeking favorable action from the FCC. Commissioner Clifford Durr petitioned House Speaker Sam Rayburn to remove Cox from the committee for conflict of interest, but Rayburn, a personal friend of Cox, referred the issue to the Judiciary Committee, which concluded that it had no authority in the matter. The original conflict of interest led to a criminal inquiry of Cox by the US Department of Justice, and it destroyed the credibility of his investigation of the agency to such a degree that Cox was forced to give up his committee seat.

In 1947 to 1948, he served on the Herter Committee.

In June 1949, during the debate on the Housing Act of 1949, Cox, then 69, started a fist fight on the floor of the House with the House Dean, Representative Adolph J. Sabath (then 83). The combatants, each a longstanding Democratic member of the Rules Committee, soon apologized and expressed their admiration for the other.

In the 82nd Congress, his final term, Cox was chairman of the United States House Select Committee to Investigate Tax-Exempt Foundations and Comparable Organizations. The Committee's focus was on whether the organizations and persons receiving funding from foundations included subversives. The Committee's report was not issued until after Cox's death.

After his death in Bethesda, Maryland, Cox was interred in Oakview Cemetery, Camilla, Georgia.

== See also ==
- List of members of the United States Congress who died in office (1950–1999)

U.S. House of Representatives
Preceded by Frank Park	Member of the U.S. House of Representatives from Georgia's 2nd congressional district March 4, 1925 – December 24, 1952	Succeeded by J. L. Pilcher
