= Louise Goff Reece =

American politician (1898–1970)

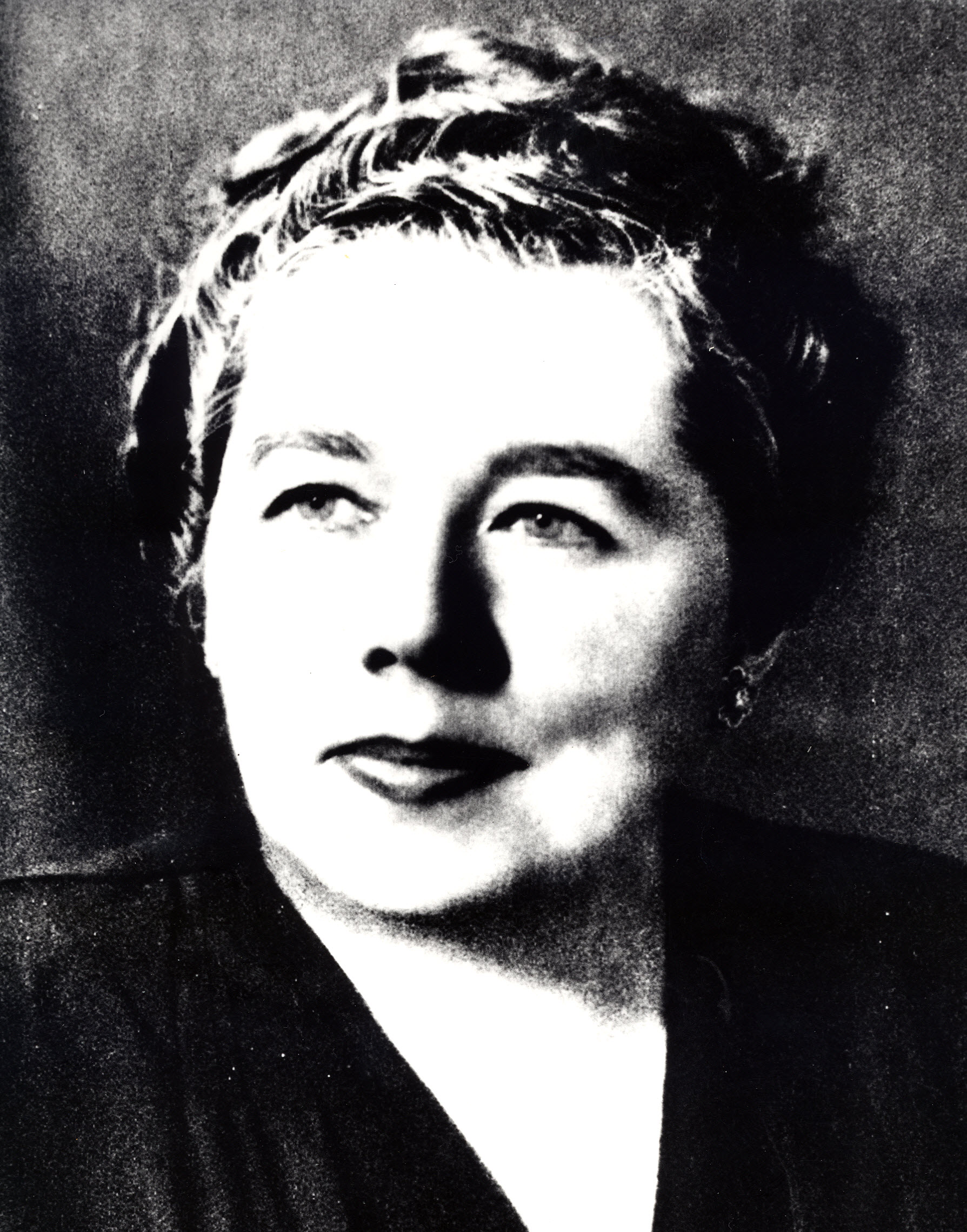

Member of the U.S. House of Representatives from Tennessee's 1st district
- In office May 16, 1961 – January 3, 1963
- Preceded by: Brazilla Carroll Reece
- Succeeded by: Jimmy Quillen

Personal details
- Born: Louise Goff; November 6, 1898 Milwaukee, Wisconsin
- Died: May 14, 1970 (aged 71) Johnson City, Tennessee
- Resting place: Monte Vista Memorial Park
- Party: Republican
- Spouse: Brazilla Carroll Reece

Louise Goff Reece (November 6, 1898 – May 14, 1970) was an American businesswoman and politician. She was a United States representative from Tennessee, succeeding her husband after his death.

== Early life ==
Born in Milwaukee, Wisconsin, Reece was a daughter of Guy D. Goff and granddaughter of Nathan Goff, both of whom were U.S. Senators from West Virginia. She was educated at Miss Treat's School, Milwaukee-Downer Seminary, and Miss Spence's School in New York City.

== Career ==
During the long service of her husband, Representative Brazilla Carroll Reece, she regularly campaigned with him, serving as his chauffeur since he didn't drive. She became as well known as her husband.

=== Congress ===
Reece was elected as a Republican to the Eighty-seventh Congress to fill the vacancy when her husband died. She served from May 16, 1961, until January 3, 1963. She was not a candidate for renomination in 1962 to the Eighty-eighth Congress.

=== Later career ===
Remaining active in State and national politics, Reece was a businesswoman with wide interests in Tennessee and West Virginia. She was a member of the board of the First Peoples Bank, Johnson City, Tennessee, and chairman of the board of Carter County Bank, Elizabethton, Tennessee. She was also proprietor and manager of Goff Properties in Clarksburg, West Virginia.

== Death ==
Reece died in Johnson City, Tennessee, on May 14, 1970 (age 71 years, 189 days). She is interred at Monte Vista Memorial Park.

== See also ==
- Women in the United States House of Representatives

Political offices
Preceded by B. Carroll Reece	Member of the U.S. House of Representatives from Tennessee's 1st congressional district 1961–1963	Succeeded by Jimmy Quillen
