= J. L. Pilcher =

American politician (1898–1981)

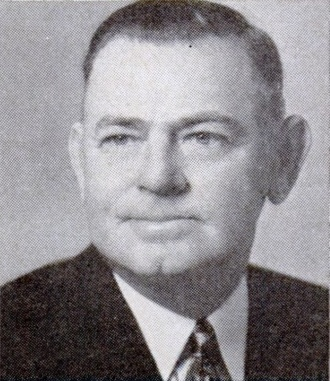

Member of the U.S. House of Representatives from Georgia's 2nd district
- In office February 4, 1953 – January 3, 1965
- Preceded by: E. Eugene Cox
- Succeeded by: Maston E. O'Neal, Jr.

Personal details
- Born: John Leonard Pilcher; August 27, 1898 Meigs, Georgia, U.S.
- Died: August 20, 1981 (aged 82) Meigs, Georgia, U.S.
- Party: Democratic
- Occupation: Businessman

John Leonard Pilcher (August 27, 1898 – August 20, 1981) was a U.S. Representative from Georgia.

Born on a farm near Meigs, Georgia, Pilcher attended public schools in the area. He engaged in agricultural pursuits for thirty-five years and operated a general mercantile business, a fertilizer manufacturing plant, a syrup canning plant, several warehouses, and a cotton gin. Pilcher served as mayor and councilman of Meigs, Georgia, and member of the board of education as well as county commissioner. He served as a member of the State House of Representatives. Pilcher served as a member of the State Senate from 1940 to 1944 and was a State purchasing agent in 1948 and 1949. He served as a delegate at each state and national Democratic Convention for thirty years.

Pilcher was elected as a Democrat to the Eighty-third Congress to fill the vacancy caused by the death of E. E. Cox. He was reelected to the Eighty-fourth and the four succeeding Congresses and served from February 4, 1953, to January 3, 1965.

A staunch segregationist, in 1956, Pilcher signed "The Southern Manifesto."

During his Congressional career, Pilcher had a mainly liberal voting record.

He was not a candidate for renomination in 1964 to the Eighty-ninth Congress. Resided in Meigs, Georgia, where he died August 20, 1981. He was interred in Meigs Sunset Cemetery.

U.S. House of Representatives
Preceded by E. Eugene Cox	Member of the U.S. House of Representatives from Georgia's 2nd congressional district February 4, 1953 – January 3, 1965	Succeeded by Maston E. O'Neal, Jr.
