= United States House Select Committee to Investigate Tax-Exempt Foundations and Comparable Organizations =

1952-1954 investigation

The Select Committee to Investigate Tax-Exempt Foundations and Comparable Organizations was an investigative committee of the United States House of Representatives between 1952 and 1954. The committee was originally created by House Resolution 561 during the 82nd Congress. The committee investigated the use of funds by tax-exempt organizations (non-profit organizations) to see if they were being used to support communism. The committee was alternatively known as the Cox Committee and the Reece Committee after its two chairmen, E. Eugene Cox and B. Carroll Reece.

== History ==
In April 1952, the Select Committee to Investigate Tax-Exempt Foundations and Comparable Organizations (or just the Cox Committee Investigation), led by E. Eugene Cox, of the House of Representatives began an investigation of the "educational and philanthropic foundations and other comparable organizations which are exempt from federal taxes to determine whether they were using their resources for the purposes for which they were established, and especially to determine which such foundations and organizations are using their resources for un-American activities and subversive activities or for purposes not in the interest or tradition of the United States."

In the fall of 1952 all foundations with assets of $10 million or more received a questionnaire covering virtually every aspect of their operations. The foundations cooperated willingly. In the committee's final report, submitted to Congress in January 1953, endorsed the loyalty of the foundations. "So far as we can ascertain, there is little basis for the belief expressed in some quarters that foundation funds are being diverted from their intended use," the report said.

Unhappy with the Cox Committee's conclusions, Rep. Reece pushed for a continuation of its work. In April 1954, the House authorized the Reece Committee. Unlike its predecessor, which limited its attention to generalities, the Reece Committee mounted a comprehensive inquiry into both the motives for establishing foundations and their influence on public life. The investigative inquiry was headed by Norman Dodd, a former banker.

== Members ==
Edward Eugene Cox of Georgia served as chairman of the committee until his death on December 24, 1952. Brooks Hays of Arkansas served as acting chairman after Chairman Cox's death.

Majority	Minority
E. Eugene Cox, Georgia, Chairman; Brooks Hays, Arkansas; Aime J. Forand, Rhode Island; Donald L. O'Toole, New York	Richard M. Simpson, Pennsylvania, Ranking Member; Angier L. Goodwin, Massachusetts; B. Carroll Reece, Tennessee

== Dodd report ==
The final report was submitted by Norman Dodd, and because of its provocative nature, the committee became subject to attack. In the Dodd report to the Reece Committee on Foundations, he gave a definition of the word "subversive", saying that the term referred to "Any action having as its purpose the alteration of either the principle or the form of the United States Government by other than constitutional means." He then argued that the Ford Foundation, Rockefeller Foundation, and Carnegie Endowment were using funds excessively on projects at Columbia, Harvard, University of Chicago and the University of California, in order to enable oligarchical collectivism. He stated, "The purported deterioration in scholarship and in the techniques of teaching which, lately, has attracted the attention of the American public, has apparently been caused primarily by a premature effort to reduce our meager knowledge of social phenomena to the level of an applied science."

He stated that his research staff had discovered that in "1933–1936, a change took place which was so drastic as to constitute a 'revolution'. They also indicated conclusively that the responsibility for the economic welfare of the American people had been transferred heavily to the Executive Branch of the Federal Government; that a corresponding change in education had taken place from an impetus outside of the local community, and that this 'revolution' had occurred without violence and with the full consent of an overwhelming majority of the electorate." He also stated that this revolution "could not have occurred peacefully, or with the consent of the majority, unless education in the United States had been prepared in advance to endorse it."

== Final report ==
Although the promotion of internationalism and moral relativism by foundations concerned the committee, it saw their concentrated power as the more central threat. Even if benign, this power posed a threat to democratic government. The Reece Committee's report, submitted in the midst of the ultimately successful efforts to censure Senator Joseph McCarthy, failed to attract much attention. McCarthy's fall led to a discrediting of all efforts that ' smacked of redbaiting '.

The report conceded that, with several exceptions "such as the Institute of Pacific Relations, foundations have not directly supported organizations which, in turn, operated to support communism." However, the report did conclude that

Some of the larger foundations have directly supported 'subversion' in the true meaning of that term--namely, the process of undermining some of our vitally protective concepts and principles. They have actively supported attacks upon our social and governmental system and financed the promotion of socialism and collectivist ideas.

The report had also proposed changes in law: a "rule against perpetuities" to limit the lives of non-institutional foundations, 10–25 years, a denial of tax exemption to a foundation holding more than 5%-10% of any business' capital or securities, and a ban on using foundation funds to support "socialism, collectivism or any other form of society or government which is at variance with the basic principles of ours" (existing law prohibited its use only for support of communism and fascism).

This final report was made up by the majority in the committee, three Republicans: Representatives B. Carroll Reece of Tennessee, chairman, Jesse P. Wolcott of Michigan and Angier L. Goodwin of Massachusetts. However, the two Democrats on the committee did not sign the final report and were extremely critical of it.

== Criticisms ==
Opponents criticized the committee as "investigating free thought".

The Republican Angier Goodwin added a note below his signature: "In signing this report, I do so with strong reservations and dissent from many of its findings and conclusions and with the understanding that I may file a supplementary statement to follow". In his supplementary statement he disagreed with the main points of the Reece Report and agreed with the diametrically opposite conclusions of the Cox Committee of which he had been a member.

The committee's two Democrats, Wayne L. Hays and Gracie Pfost, refused to sign the final report. The Hays-Pfost minority report charged that the foundations "have been indicted and convicted under procedures which can only be characterized as barbaric." The minority accused Chairman Reece and the committee staff of a "deep-seated antagonism toward foundations" which might "well be characterized as pathological."

According to the minority report: The majority and committee staff were guilty of "an evil disregard of fundamental American guarantees." Anti-foundation witnesses were heard in full and their testimony published but the hearings were concluded as soon as pro-foundation witnesses began to present their case. Reece said the foundations would be permitted to file statements and thereby get "a fair opportunity to put their best foot forward at the same time that they escaped the embarrassment of cross-examination." The committee staff, however, apparently "deliberately ignored" the statements in preparing the report. Judging by a pro-foundation witness allowed to testify, Dr. Pendleton Herring, Social Science Research Council president whose testimony was cut off "midway," public testimony "was far from embarrassing" and was "the one certain way that [those] accused by the staff ... could destroy the deadly inferences, innuendoes and charges." By contrast, the committee gave 3 days to the testimony of San Francisco attorney Aaron M. Sargent, whose political and economic thinking could be judged by his charge that the U.S. "income tax was part of a plot by Fabian Socialists operating from England to pave the way for socialism in this country." New York attorney Rene A. Wormser, who headed the staff, had proposed that "the inquiry be made without public hearings" or "the testimony of interested persons" and instead that the staff "devote its time to independent study and inquiry."
