= Senator Conroy (disambiguation) =

Stephen Conroy (born 1963) was an Australian Senator from Victoria from 1996 to 2016. Senator Conroy may also refer to:

- Edward T. Conroy (1929–1982), Maryland State Senate
- Joe Conroy (born 1934), Michigan State Senate
- Mary A. Conroy (1931–2014), Maryland State Senate
