= Senator Mathias (disambiguation) =

Charles Mathias (1922–2010) was a U.S. Senator from Maryland from 1969 to 1987. Senator Mathias may also refer to:

- James N. Mathias Jr. (born 1951), Maryland State Senate
- John P. T. Mathias (1848–1927), Maryland State Senate

== See also ==
- Senator Mathis (disambiguation)
