= Charles Mathias =

American politician (1922–2010)

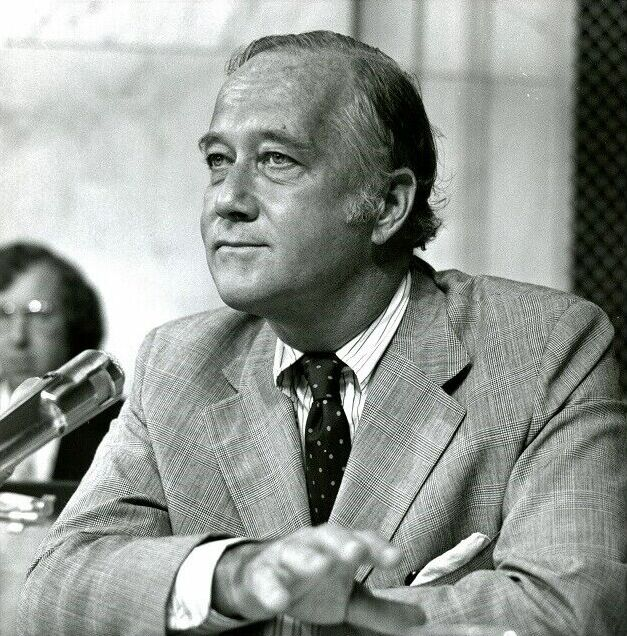

Chair of the Senate Rules Committee
- In office January 3, 1981 – January 3, 1987
- Preceded by: Claiborne Pell
- Succeeded by: Wendell Ford

United States Senator from Maryland
- In office January 3, 1969 – January 3, 1987
- Preceded by: Daniel Brewster
- Succeeded by: Barbara Mikulski

Member of the U.S. House of Representatives from Maryland's 6th district
- In office January 3, 1961 – January 3, 1969
- Preceded by: John R. Foley
- Succeeded by: J. Glenn Beall Jr.

Personal details
- Born: Charles McCurdy Mathias Jr. July 24, 1922 Frederick, Maryland, U.S.
- Died: January 25, 2010 (aged 87) Chevy Chase, Maryland, U.S.
- Resting place: Mount Olivet Cemetery; Frederick, Maryland, U.S.
- Party: Republican
- Spouse: Ann Bradford
- Relatives: John P. T. Mathias; Charles Edward Trail
- Education: Haverford College (BA); Yale University; University of Maryland, Baltimore (LLB)

Military service
- Allegiance: United States
- Branch/service: United States Navy
- Battles/wars: World War II

Charles McCurdy Mathias Jr. (July 24, 1922 – January 25, 2010) was an American politician and attorney from the U.S. state of Maryland. A member of the Republican Party, he served in both chambers of the United States Congress as a member of the United States House of Representatives from 1961 to 1969 and as a member of the United States Senate from 1969 to 1987. He was also a member of the Maryland House of Delegates from 1959 to 1961.

After studying law and serving in the United States Navy during World War II, Mathias worked as a lawyer and was elected to the state legislature in 1958. In 1960, he was elected to the U.S. House of Representatives from Western Maryland. He was re-elected three times (1962, 1964, 1966), serving in the House for eight years, where he aligned himself with the then-influential liberal wing of the Republican Party.

Mathias was elected to the Senate in 1968, unseating the incumbent Democrat, Daniel Brewster, who twenty years earlier had been his roommate while attending the University of Maryland School of Law. He continued his record as a liberal Republican in the Senate, and frequently clashed with the conservative wing of his party. For a few months in late 1975 and early 1976, Mathias considered running an insurgent presidential campaign in an attempt to stave off the increasing influence of conservative Republicans led by Ronald Reagan.

His confrontations with conservatives cost him several leadership positions in the Senate, including chairmanship of the Judiciary Committee. Despite isolation from his conservative colleagues, Mathias played an influential role in fostering African American civil rights, ending the Vietnam War, preserving the Chesapeake Bay, and constructing the Vietnam Veterans Memorial. He retired from the Senate in 1987, having served in Congress for twenty-six years (eight years in the U.S. House of Representatives and eighteen years in the U.S. Senate). As of 2024, he remains the last Republican to have served as a U.S. Senator from Maryland.

== Early life and career ==
Mathias was born in Frederick, Maryland, the son of Theresa (née Trail) and Charles McCurdy Mathias. His father was politically active, and he was a descendant of several Maryland legislators, including his grandfather John P. T. Mathias and Charles Edward Trail. After graduating from Frederick High School, Mathias graduated from Haverford College in Pennsylvania in 1944. He went on to attend Yale University and received a law degree from the University of Maryland School of Law in 1949.

In 1942, during World War II, Mathias enlisted in the United States Navy and served at the rank of seaman apprentice. He was promoted to ensign in 1944 and served sea duty in the Pacific Ocean, including the recently devastated Hiroshima, from 1944 until he was released from active duty in 1946. Following the war, Mathias rose to the rank of captain in the United States Naval Reserve.

Mathias briefly served as assistant Attorney General of Maryland from 1953 to 1954. From 1954 to 1959, he worked as the City Attorney of Frederick, where he supported civil rights for African Americans. He played a role in desegregating the local Opera House movie theater, which restricted African American seating to the back of the theater. Mathias also worked to relocate the Frederick post office and helped protect a park in the city. In 1958, he was elected to the Maryland House of Delegates, serving from 1959 to 1960. As a delegate, he voted in favor of Maryland ratifying the Fourteenth Amendment to the United States Constitution, which secured African American rights following the American Civil War. With his support, the legislature ratified the amendment in 1959, nearly 100 years after it was first introduced.

In 1958, Mathias married Ann Bradford, whom he met at a birthday party for his law school roommate Daniel Brewster. Ann Bradford (1928–2012) was the daughter of former Massachusetts governor Robert F. Bradford. Their children included sons Robert and Charles.

== U.S. House of Representatives ==
On January 4, 1960, Mathias declared his candidacy for the House seat of Maryland's 6th congressional district. He officially began his campaign in March, establishing public education and controls on government spending as two of his priorities should he be elected. In the primary elections of May 1960, Mathias handily defeated his two rivals, garnering a 3–1 margin of victory.

Mathias' opponent in the general election was John R. Foley, a former judge who had unseated DeWitt Hyde in a Democratic landslide in the state two years prior. Both candidates attacked each other's voting records, with Foley accusing Mathias of skipping more than 500 votes in the House of Delegates and having the "worst Republican record in Annapolis". Mathias previously accused Foley of voting "present" (a de facto abstention) in the House too often, and argued Foley's inaction led to inflation and higher taxes. Mathias prevailed over Foley on election day in November 1960, unseating the one-term incumbent and becoming the first representative from Frederick County since Milton Urner in 1883.

During his eight-year career in the House, Mathias established himself as a member of the liberal wing of the Republican Party, which was the most influential at the time. Mathias voted in favor of the Civil Rights Acts of 1964 and 1968, and the Voting Rights Act of 1965. He was the author of the "Mathias Amendment" to the unsuccessful 1966 civil rights bill on open housing, which would have excluded dwellings of four or fewer families from the proposed open housing law. Concerning environmental issues, Mathias sponsored legislation to make the Chesapeake and Ohio Canal a national park, and supported other conservation initiatives along the Potomac River. He also served on the Judiciary Committee and the Committee on the District of Columbia. As a member of the D.C. Committee, Mathias was a proponent of establishing home rule in the District of Columbia.

== U.S. Senate ==
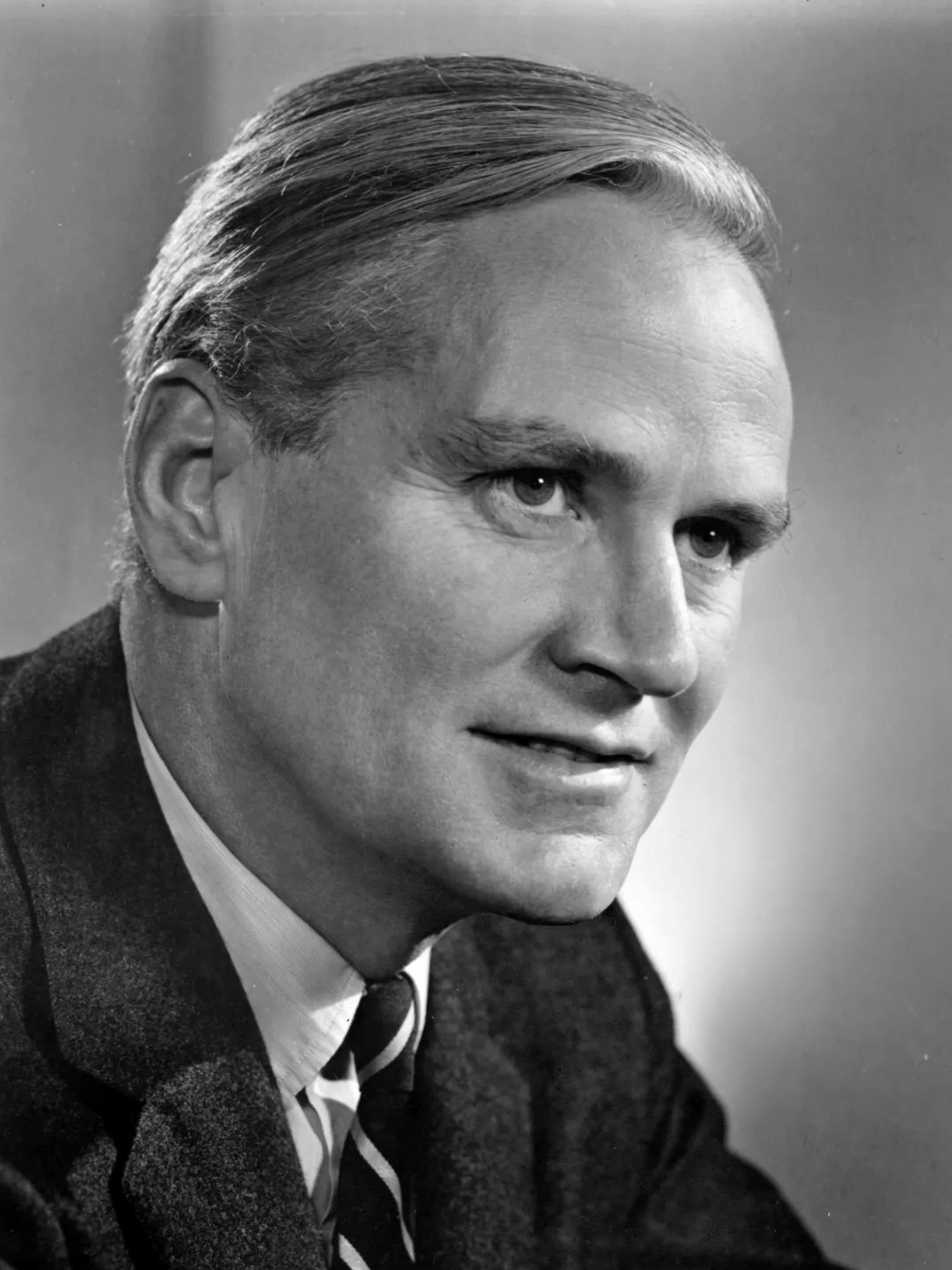
The incumbent Daniel Brewster, whom Mathias defeated despite the Democratic Party's 3–1 advantage in registered voters

=== Election of 1968: unseating Brewster ===
Leading up to the United States Senate elections of 1968, Mathias' name was frequently mentioned as a potential challenger to Democratic incumbent Daniel Brewster, his college roommate. Fellow Republican Congressman Rogers Morton of Maryland's 1st congressional district was also considering a run at Brewster's seat, but was dissuaded by Republican party leaders in the state in favor of a Mathias candidacy. Their decision was largely due to the geography of Mathias' seat. As representative of the 6th district, he already had established name recognition in both the Baltimore and Washington, D.C., metropolitan areas, the more densely populated and liberal areas of the state. Morton's seat was anchored in the more rural Eastern Shore. Mathias' seat was also more likely to stay in Republican hands. While Morton's seat had been in Republican hands for all but four years since 1947 due to its socially conservative bent, it still voted for Democrats downballot. Mathias had also established a more liberal voting record, which was argued to serve him better in a state with a 3-1 Democratic advantage in registered voters.

Mathias officially declared his candidacy for the Senate on February 10, 1968, calling for troop reductions in the Vietnam War, and identifying urban blight, racial discrimination, welfare reform, and improving public schools as major issues. As the campaign drew on, the two primary issues became the war and crime. Mathias argued that the extensive bombing campaigns in North Vietnam should be reduced, while Brewster had argued for increasing bombardment. Brewster adopted a hard line stance on law and order, while Mathias advocated addressing the precipitating causes of poverty and the low standard of living in urban ghettos. Campaign finances were also an issue, with controversy erupting over Brewster's receipt of $15,000 in campaign contributions from his Senate staff and their families. On November 5, 1968, Mathias was elected, garnering 48% of the vote to Brewster's 39% and perennial candidate George P. Mahoney's 13%.

=== First term (1969–1975): conflict with Nixon ===
Mathias began his first term in the Senate in January 1969 and laid out his legislative agenda soon thereafter. He was appointed to the District of Columbia committee, where he argued in favor of home rule in the district and providing D.C. residents full representation in both chambers of Congress. Both were positions he carried over from his career in the House. In December 1970, he finally gained passage of legislation creating the Chesapeake and Ohio Canal National Historical Park. He also served as chair of the Special Committee on Termination of the National Emergency from 1971 to 1977, which produced Senate Report 93-549.

Charles Mathias speaking before a Senate Committee.

Over the course of his first term, Mathias was frequently at odds with his conservative colleagues in the Senate and the Richard Nixon administration. In June 1969, Mathias joined with fellow liberal Republican Hugh Scott of Pennsylvania in threatening a "rebellion" unless the Nixon administration worked harder to protect African American civil rights. He also warned against Republicans using the "Southern strategy" of attracting conservative George Wallace voters at the expense of moderate or liberal voters. Mathias voted against two controversial Nixon Supreme Court nominees, Clement Haynsworth and G. Harrold Carswell, neither of whom was confirmed. Mathias was also an early advocate for setting a timetable for withdrawal of troops from Vietnam, and was against the bombing campaigns Nixon launched into Laos. In October 1972, Mathias became the first Republican on Ted Kennedy's Judiciary subcommittee and one of only a few in the nation to support investigation of the Watergate Scandal, which was still in its early stages.

Mathias' disagreements with the administration became well-known, causing columnists Rowland Evans and Robert Novak to name him the "new supervillain... in President Nixon's doghouse". Evans and Novak also commented that "not since [Charles Goodell] was defeated with White House connivance has any Republican so outraged Mr. Nixon and his senior staff as Mathias. The senator's liberalism and tendency to bolt party lines have bred animosity in the inner sanctum". Because of their differing ideologies, there was speculation that Mathias was going to be "purged" from the party by Nixon in a similar manner as Goodell in 1971, but these threats disappeared after the Watergate scandal escalated. By the numbers, Mathias sided with the Nixon administration 47% of the time, and voted with the majority of his Republican colleagues in the Senate 31% of the time, during his first term.

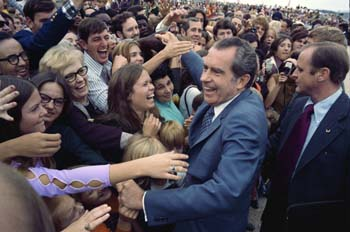
Mathias frequently clashed ideologically with the Richard Nixon Administration.

In early 1974, the group Americans for Democratic Action rated Mathias the most liberal member of the GOP in the Senate based on twenty key votes in the 1973 legislative session. At 90 percent, his score was higher than most Democrats in the Senate, and was fourth-highest amongst all members. Issues considered when rating senators included their positions on civil rights, mass transit, D.C. home rule, tax reform, and reducing overseas troop levels. The League of Women Voters gave Mathias a 100% on issues important to them, and the AFL-CIO agreed with Mathias on 32 out of 45 key labor votes. Conversely, the conservative group Americans for Constitutional Action stated Mathias agreed with their positions only 16% of the time.

=== Election of 1974: challenge from Mikulski ===
As a Republican representing heavily Democratic Maryland, Mathias faced a potentially difficult re-election bid for the 1974 election. State Democrats nominated Barbara Mikulski, then a Baltimore City Councilwoman who was well known to residents in her city as a social activist, but with limited name recognition in the rest of the state. Mathias was renominated by Republicans, fending off a primary election challenge from conservative doctor Ross Pierpont. Pierpont was never a substantial threat to Mathias, whose lack of competition was due in part to fallout from the Watergate scandal.

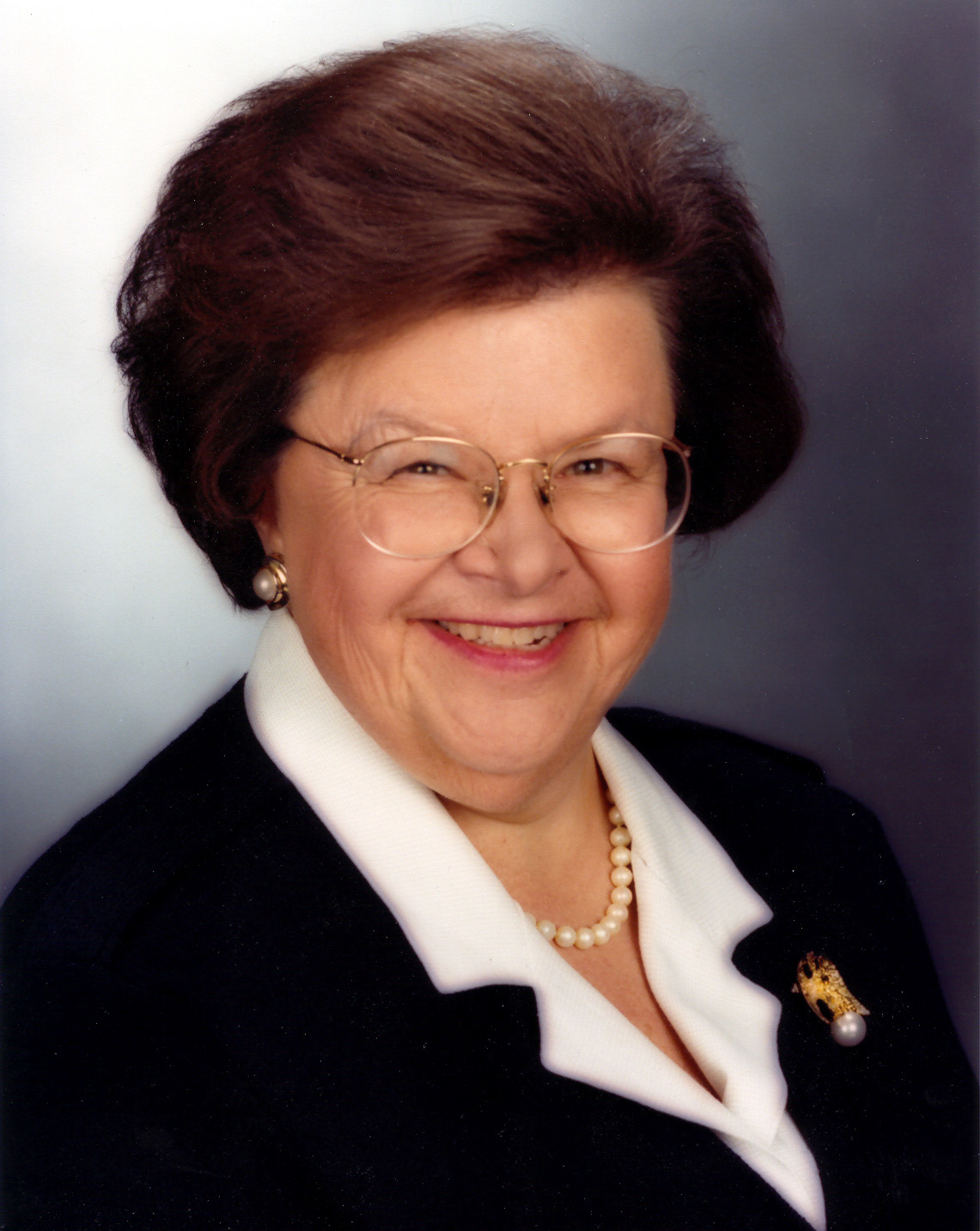
Barbara Mikulski challenged Mathias for his seat in 1974.

As an advocate for campaign finance reform, Mathias refused to accept any contribution over $100 to "avoid the curse of big money that has led to so much trouble in the last year". However, he still managed to raise over $250,000, nearly five times Mikulski's total. Ideologically, Mikulski and Mathias agreed on many issues, such as closing tax loopholes and easing taxes on the middle class. On two issues, however, Mathias argued to reform Congress and the U.S. tax system to address inflation and corporate price fixing, contrary to Mikulski. In retrospect, The Washington Post felt the election was "an intelligent discussion of state, national, and foreign affairs by two smart, well-informed people".

With Maryland voters, Mathias benefited from his frequent disagreements with the Nixon administration and his liberal voting record. On November 5, 1974, he was re-elected by a 57% to 43% margin, though he lost badly in Baltimore City and Baltimore County, where Mikulski was popular. Mikulski would win his seat 12 years later in 1986 as Mathias retired.

=== Second term (1975–1981): unease with the growth of conservatism ===
In 1975, Mathias co-introduced legislation with Illinois Senator Adlai Stevenson III that would prohibit foreign aid to South Vietnam after June 30, 1975.

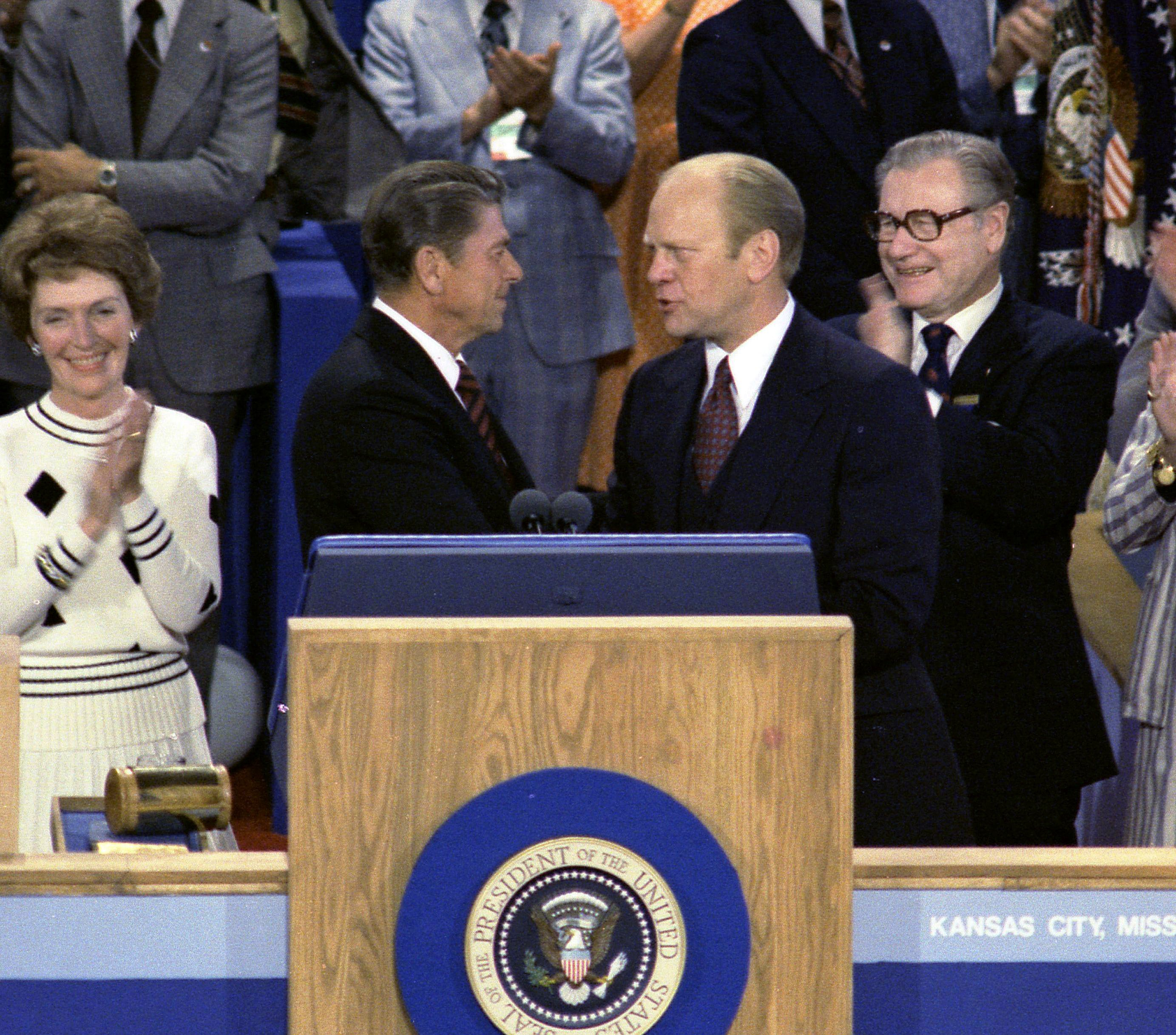
Mathias expressed concern over the growing influence of conservatives in the Republican Party during the 1976 campaign between Gerald Ford and Ronald Reagan.

Mathias expressed concerns with the state of his party leading up to the 1976 presidential election, specifically its shift further to the right. Referring to the nomination contest between Gerald Ford and Ronald Reagan, Mathias remarked that the party leadership was placed "in further isolation, in an extreme—almost fringe—position". On November 8, 1975, he hinted at entering some presidential primary elections to steer the party away from what he saw as a strong conservative trend. Over the next few months, Mathias continued to show signs of entering the election, but never campaigned aggressively and lacked any political organization. Columnist George Will commented that Mathias was "contemplating a race—a stroll, really—for the presidency", in reference to his staid campaign.

After four months of consideration, Mathias decided in March 1976 to not seek the presidency, and asked for his name to be withdrawn from the Massachusetts primary ballot, where it had been added automatically. He had also been considering an independent bid, but said raising money would be too difficult under campaign finance laws. Upon his withdrawal, Mathias stated he would work with the Republican Party in the upcoming elections. However, despite his pledge to support the Republican candidate, Mathias' criticism of the party did not wane, stating that "over and over again during the primaries, I have felt uncomfortably like a member of the chorus in a Greek tragedy". In a further criticism of his party's neglect of liberal voters, Mathias commented:

I've had to deal with some hard truths... People don't like to hear we've got only 18 percent of the electorate. They pretend it's not important that our following among blacks, and young people, and urban communities is not what it should be... But I feel it's of the greatest importance that if there's to be a Republican Party, we look these facts in the face.

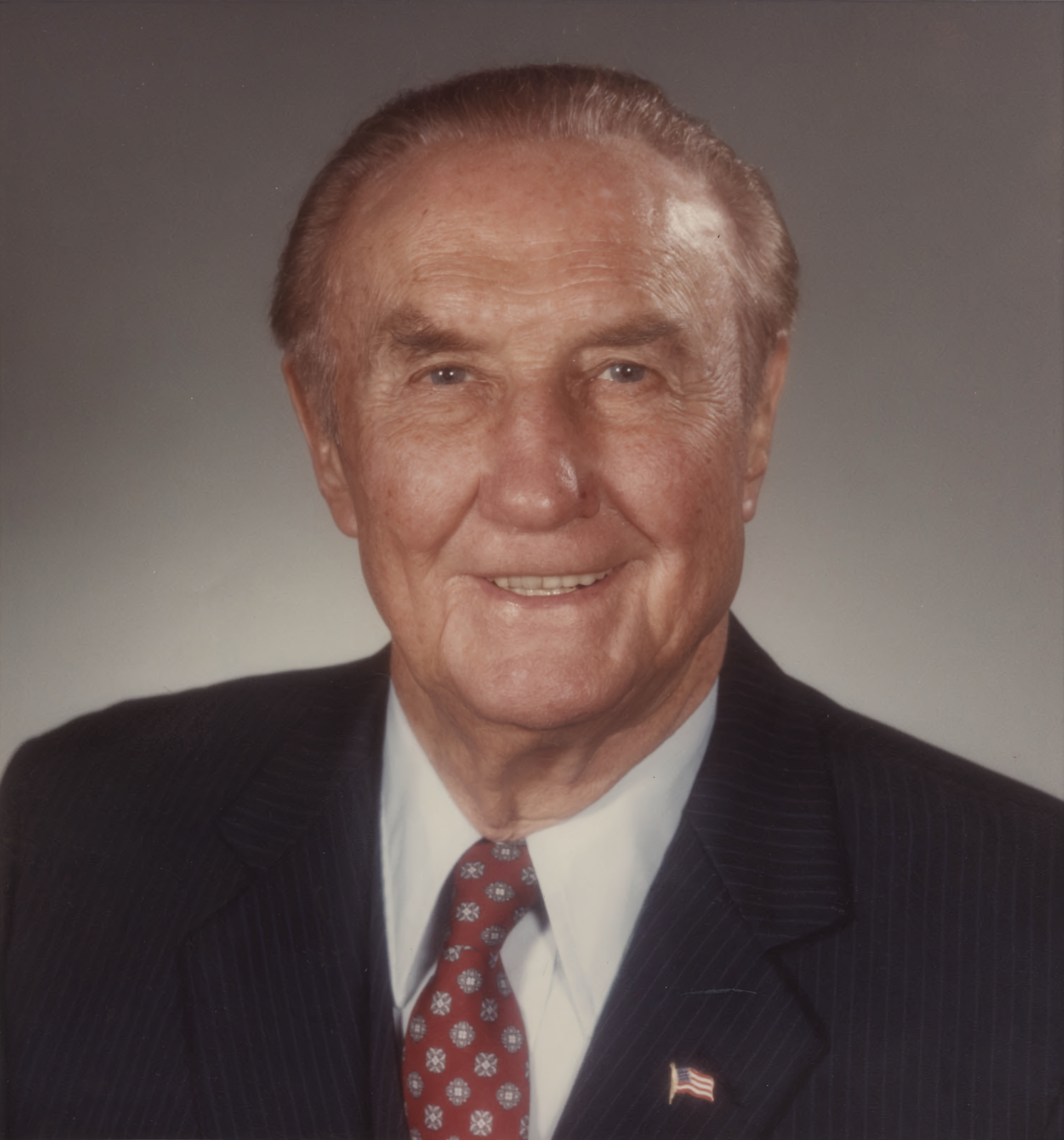
Strom Thurmond blocked Mathias from serving as ranking member of the Judiciary Committee.

Mathias' candidacy consideration did not endear him to the conservative wing of the Maryland Republican Party organization. In June 1976, he lost a vote by state Republicans to determine who would represent Maryland on the platform committee at the 1976 Republican National Convention. Instead, the group chose George Price, a conservative member of the Maryland House of Delegates from Baltimore County. At one point, Mathias was close to being denied attendance to the convention altogether as an at-large delegate, but a last minute compromise ensured all Republican congressional representatives seats as at-large delegates. Mathias maintained a low profile during the convention, and received harsh criticism from some of the conservative delegates from Maryland who attended.

At the beginning of the new Congress in 1977, Mathias was in line for several potential committee promotions to ranking member. However, Mathias' outspoken criticism of the party in the previous election cycle aroused enmity amongst his colleagues. On the Judiciary Committee, Mathias had the most seniority of any other member except Strom Thurmond of South Carolina, who already held another ranking membership on the Armed Services Committee. Only one ranking membership was allowed per senator, so Thurmond resigned his ranking membership on the Armed Services Committee to circumvent Mathias serving as ranking member of the Judiciary Committee. Mathias was also prevented from assuming leadership positions on the Government Operations Committee following a power struggle, and on the Judiciary Subcommittee on Constitutional Rights. On the latter subcommittee, Mathias had more seniority than any other member. However, party leaders were uneasy with the idea of allowing Mathias to team up with liberal Democrat and subcommittee chairman Birch Bayh, and voted instead for William L. Scott as ranking member.

=== Election of 1980: uncertain party renomination ===
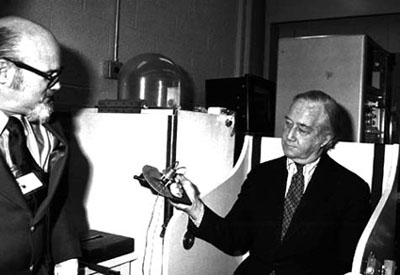
Senator Mathias exhibits his grip strength with a hand dynamometer during a tour of the Gerontology Research Center testing laboratories of the National Institutes of Health, 1980.

After these slights, speculation was raised that Mathias would leave the Republican Party, especially as the 1980 elections were approaching. Several prominent conservatives in the state, such as U.S. Representatives Marjorie Holt and Robert Bauman, were considering challenging Mathias for his seat. In contrast, the Democratic side of the aisle had fewer challengers, suggesting Mathias would win renomination more easily if he were to switch parties. However, Mathias chose to remain as a Republican, and teamed up with eight other Republican senators to express their dissatisfaction with the hard-line wing of the party. Mathias later stated that he had never seriously considered switching parties.

When it came time to nominate members to the 1980 Republican National Convention, Maryland Republicans voted for Mathias and Bauman as co-chairmen of the delegation to represent the liberal and conservative wings of the party, respectively. The 1980 nomination contest lacked the "fierce ideological bickering that marked the 1976 state convention", in which Mathias was nearly excluded as a delegate.

Despite initial concerns that a strong conservative would run in the 1980 Republican primary, Mathias did not face any major opposition for his seat. He easily won his party's nomination, and was re-elected by a substantial margin in November. His Democratic counterpart in the election, State Senator Edward T. Conroy, positioned himself as more conservative than Mathias. Conroy also made national defense the primary issue of his campaign, where he accused Mathias of being weak. Mathias countered, stating he had voted for over $1.1 trillion in defense spending during his career in the Senate. By winning easy re-election, Mathias became the first Maryland Republican to win election to a third Senate term, and also the only Republican to win the city of Baltimore up to that point. He also secured support from several precincts of Baltimore's Democratic political machine, and several labor unions.

=== Final term (1981–1987) ===
After Republicans gained control of the Senate in 1981, Mathias sought the chairmanship of the Judiciary Committee but was relegated to the relatively mundane chairmanship of the Rules Committee. He was also appointed chairman of the Government Operations Subcommittee on Government Efficiency and the District of Columbia, and accepted a seat on the influential Foreign Relations Committee, though he had to sacrifice his seat on the Appropriations Committee to do so. In 1982, Mathias chaired a bipartisan Senate inquiry into the methods used by the FBI in the Abscam corruption investigation, which found that dozens of officials had been named for accepting bribes without basis. He also served as co-chair of the Joint Committee on Printing from 1981 to 1983 and 1985 to 1987, and as a member of the Joint Committee on the Library from 1983 to 1987.

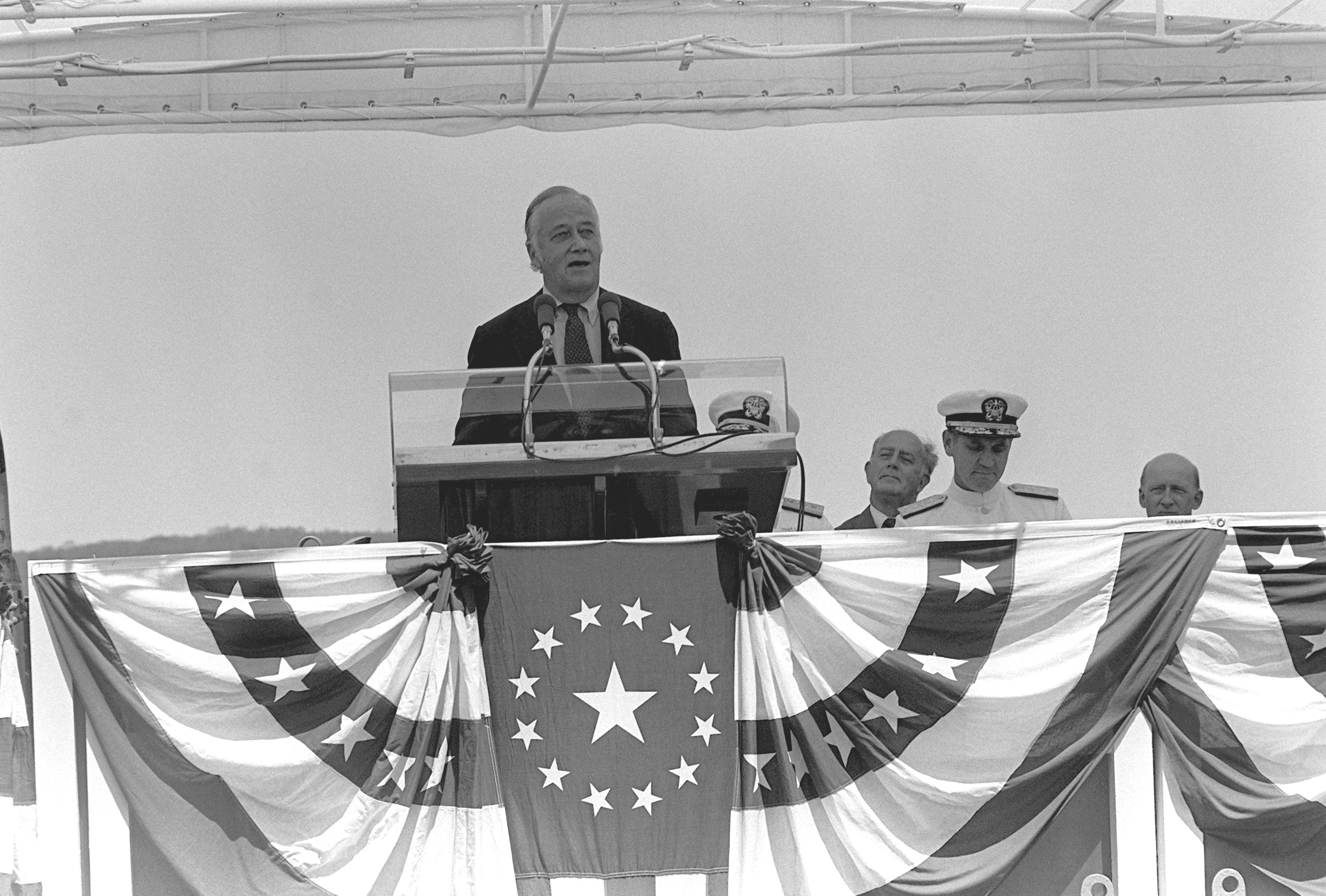
Mathias speaking at the commissioning ceremony for the USS Baltimore attack submarine, July 24, 1982.

Leading up to the 1986 elections, it was unclear whether Mathias would seek a fourth term. His support of President Reagan was lukewarm, which had further isolated him ideologically from his Republican colleagues. One delegate at the Maryland state party convention had even called Mathias "liberal swine" for his record. Additionally, his frequent difficulties in securing a committee chairmanship along with his low attendance rate were raising questions regarding his ability. However, Mathias was showing signs of seeking re-election in 1985, and dismissed any claims of ineffectiveness. Mathias claimed "within a matter of minutes, I can talk to any member of the Cabinet; and I could go see them within 24 hours.... It was no accident that the Chesapeake Bay was mentioned in the President's State of the Union address. That took a lot of hard work".

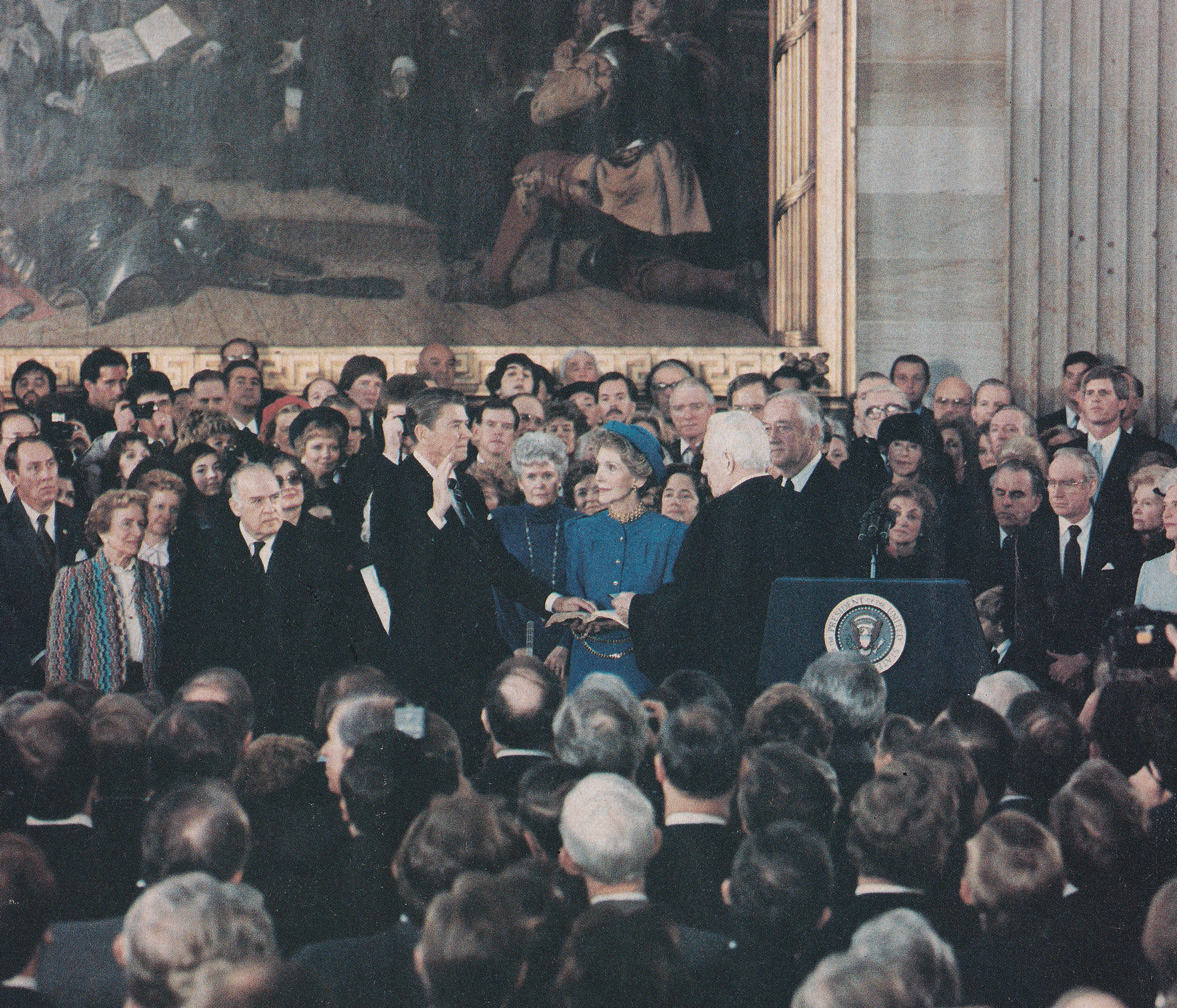
Senator Mathias attending President Reagan's swearing in.

During this term, Mathias was also president of the NATO Parliamentary Assembly from 1985 to 1986.

Despite initial indications otherwise, Mathias announced on September 27, 1985, that he would not seek a fourth term. His announcement concerned Republican party officials in the state, who feared that local Republicans had poorer election chances without Mathias at the top of the ticket. At the national level, Mathias' announcement came shortly after news that Republican Paul Laxalt of Nevada would be retiring as well. The departure of two Republican senators from swing or Democratic-leaning states was treated by Republican party leaders as a poor sign of the party's chances in the upcoming elections. Linda Chavez won the Republican primary for the Senate seat, but lost the general election in a landslide to Mikulski.

Mathias remained active in his final days in the Senate, playing an important role in removing a death penalty provision in a 1986 Senate drug bill after threatening filibuster, and in preparing impeachment trial proceedings against federal judge Harry E. Claiborne. Mathias' last day in the Senate was January 3, 1987, at which point he was succeeded by Mikulski.

=== Mathias and the American Space program ===
Mathias strongly supported the American Space program. The Jimmy Carter administration was fairly inactive on space issues, stating that it was "neither feasible nor necessary" to commit to an Apollo-style space program, and his space policy included only limited, short-range goals. With regard to military space policy, the Carter space policy stated, without much specification in the unclassified version, that "The United States will pursue Activities in space in support of its right of self-defense.".

Less than five months after he became president, on the date of June 9, 1977, Carter wrote the following in his White House Diary: "We continued our budget meetings. It's obvious that the space shuttle is just a contrivance to keep NASA alive, and that no real need for the space shuttle was determined before the massive construction program was initiated."

On NASA's own 50th anniversary website, space historian John Logsdon described the Carter presidency in less than flattering terms. "Jimmy Carter was perhaps the least supportive of US human space efforts of any president in the last half-century", Logsdon wrote.

Carter's Vice President, Walter Mondale, called the Space Shuttle a "senseless extravaganza" in 1972. A senator from Minnesota at the time, Mondale had vigorously opposed early funding measures to begin development of the shuttle. His views exemplified those who believed the United States had more pressing needs for its money than chasing the stars.

In 1979, when President Carter considered terminating the Space Shuttle program, given its technical and scheduling problems, Mathias, who was in his second term, played a major role in saving it.

In June 1982 he was approached by Larry Mihlon, a former member of President Kennedy's space team, with an idea of Bernard Le Grelle, who had been appointed by the French President François Mitterrand as Director of the National Air and Space 1983 Bicentennial Organisation, to set up a similar organization in the United States. Mathias accepted to be the Chairman of the United States Organizing Committee of the 1983 Air and Space Bicentennial.

The Bicentennial Committee also included President Ronald Reagan, Honorary Chairman and Vice-President George Bush, Honorary Vice-Chairman General Clifton von Kann (Director), President of the National Aeronautic Association, Anna Chennault, Senator John Glenn, Senator Barry Goldwater, Apollo 17 astronaut and Senator Harrison Schmitt, Scott Crossfield, Apollo 11 astronaut Michael Collins and Walter J. Boyne, Acting Director of the National Air and Space Museum.

On July 12, 1982, Senator Mathias introduced S.J.Res.270, a joint Congressional resolution to designate 1983 as the Bicentennial of Air and Space Flight. The Resolution passed the House by Unanimous Consent on December 20, 1982, and was signed in the Senate on December 21, 1982.

On January 3, 1983, President Ronald Reagan signed the Official Proclamation to designate the year beginning January 1, 1983 as the Bicentennial of Air and Space Flight, which became Public Law (No: 97-413).

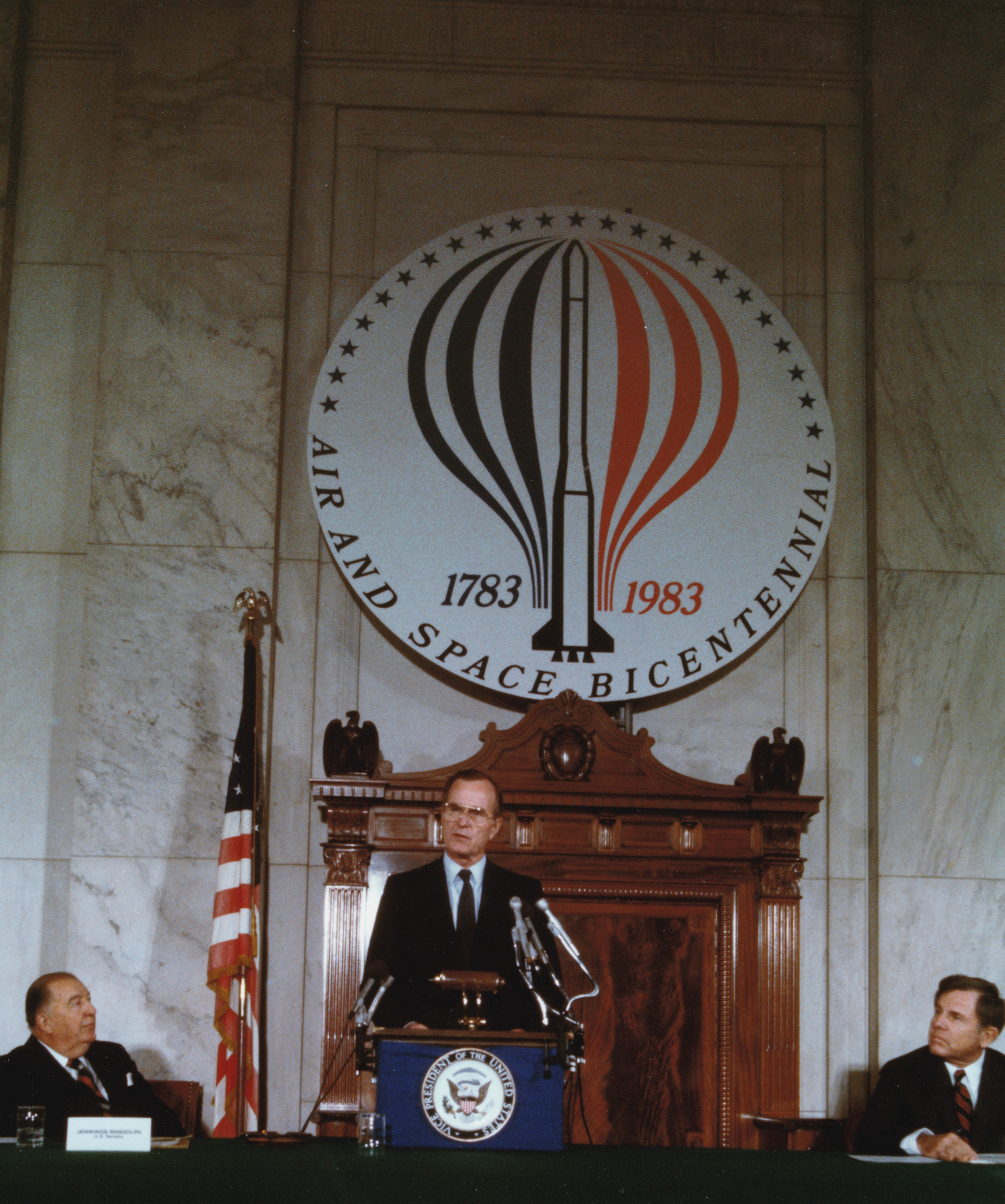
Vice-President Bush at the Caucus Room ceremony.

On November 9, 1982, Mathias, Mihlon and Le Grelle organized a ceremony in the Senate caucus room to launch the Bicentennial Year. The event, hosted by Vice President Bush, included a taped message from President Reagan and featured close-up coverage of Challenger via live remote from Cape Canaveral and last-minute preparation for the final test flight of Columbia. Jim Beggs of NASA, Lynn Helms of the FAA, Deputy Defense Secretary Frank Carlucci, Deputy Secretary of Commerce Guy Fiske, Don Fuqua, Chairman of the House Science and Technology Committee, Anna Chennault and General Clifton von Kann also participated.

The event was attended by senior executives of the Departments of Commerce and Defense, diplomats and nearly one hundred journalists. It included a live television link with Paris.

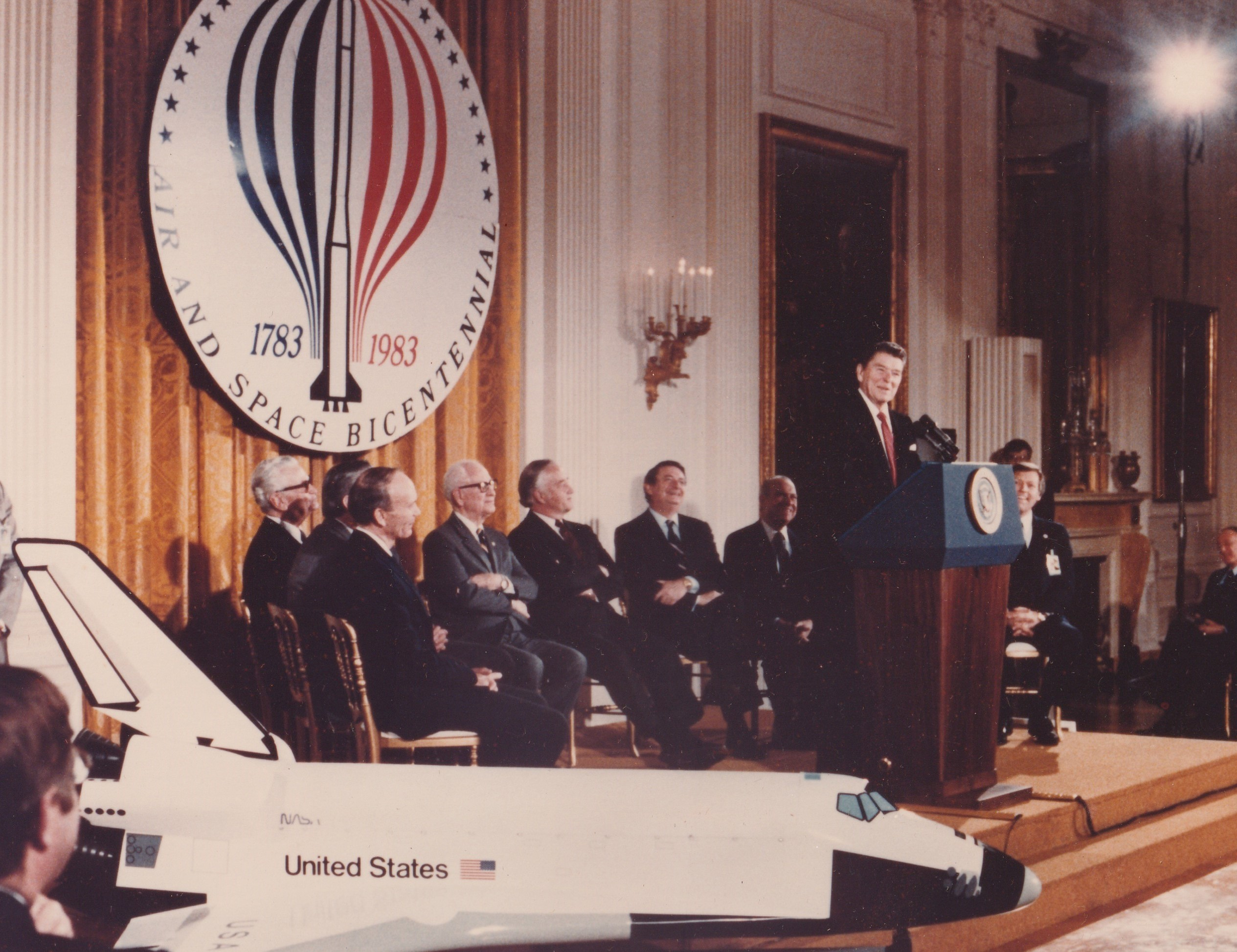
President Reagan's address in the East Room on February 7, 1983. Senator Mathias is behind the President looking sideways.

On the suggestion of Mihlon and Le Grelle, Mathias asked the White House to organize a ceremony for the Bicentennial with President Ronald Reagan. The White House ceremony commemorating the Bicentennial Year of Air and Space Flight was held on February 7, 1983. The President spoke at 1:15 p.m. in the East Room to a group of leading figures in aviation, government, diplomacy, the military, and business.

Some of President Reagan's remarks (inspired by Larry Mihlon) were similar to the style of President Kennedy's address at Rice University on the Nation's Space Effort on September 12, 1962 : "As we celebrate the many events for this bicentennial, let's remember we're celebrating more than the building of flying machines. We're making choices that are shaping the world in which our children will live. Our commitment to air and space is a pledge to them that the quality of our lives will be better and their horizons broader because of technology, of vision, of human qualities that we bring in our generation to conquering the endless cosmic frontier which stretches before us. I've always believed that mankind is capable of greatness. We haven't even come close yet to reaching our potential. But it depends on us. God gave angels wings. He gave mankind dreams. And with His help, there's no limit to what can be accomplished."

There was a large model of the Space Shuttle Columbia off to the side of the podium, and following his remarks, the President, escorted by Apollo 11 astronaut Michael Collins, inspected the model. Following the President's remarks, Senator Charles McC. Mathias Jr., Chairman of the Bicentennial Committee, presented Walter J. Boyne, Acting Director of the National Air and Space Museum, with the Air and Space Bicentennial symbol which flew in space with the Columbia shuttle mission STS-5 in November 1982. The logo, signed by all four astronauts, was the subject of the first televised commercial from space when mission commander Vance Brand displayed it for television and briefly told the bicentennial story. The logo is part of the Museum's space collection.

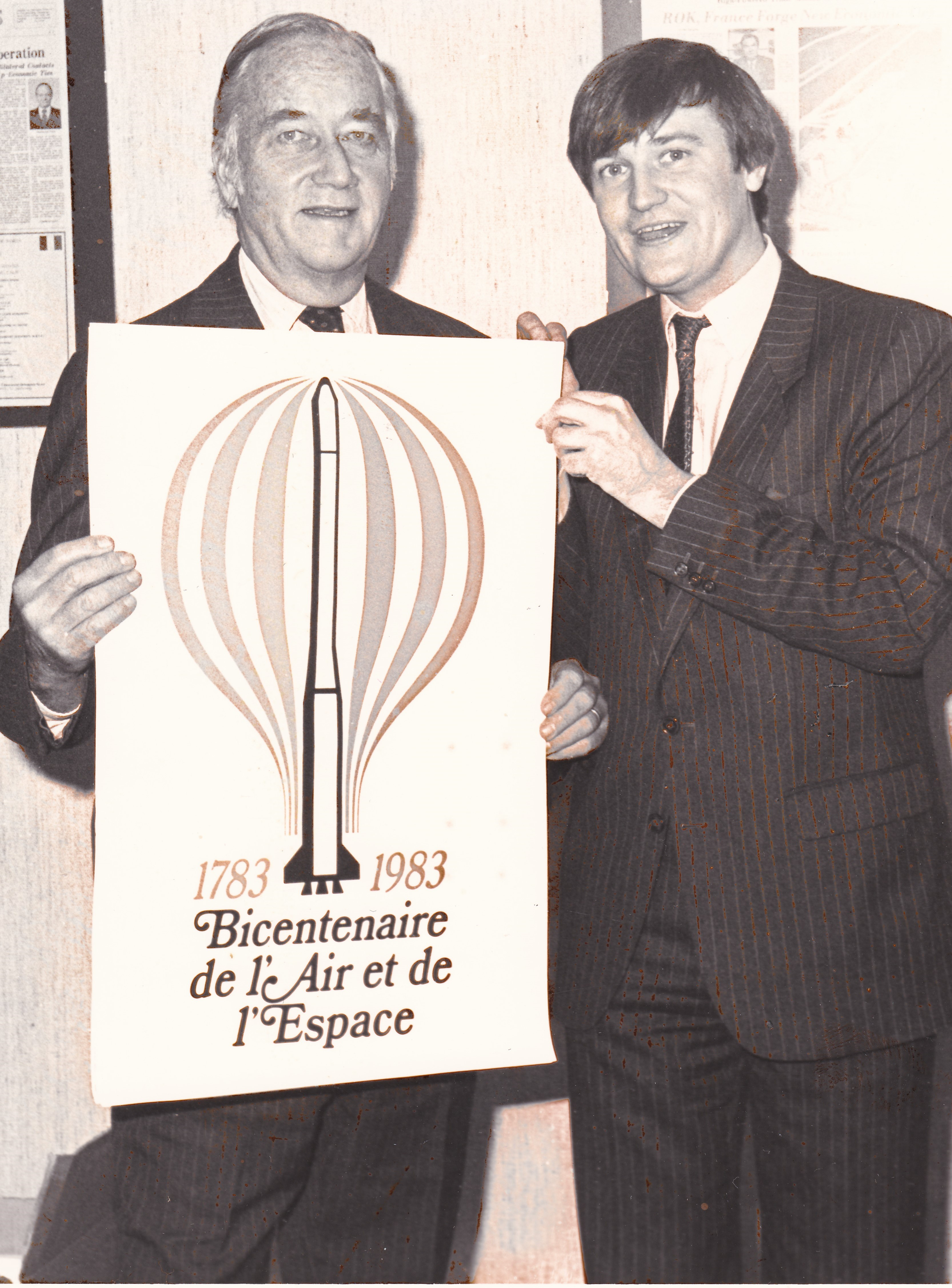
Senator Mathias with Bernard Le Grelle in the Paris Bicentennial Headquarters – December 1982

In December 1982, Senator Mathias as Chairman of the Senate Subcommittee on Patents, Copyrights and Trademarks of the Senate Judiciary Committee made an official visit to UNESCO in Paris. He had a private lunch with Le Grelle and his friend Daniel Jouve, during which they suggested the possibility to have a Space Shuttle at the 1983 Paris Air Show. Mathias found the idea excellent and wrote on December 27, 1982, to "the Honorable James M. Beggs", Administrator of the National Aeronautics and Space Administration : "Dear Jim, It has been suggested that the greatest advertisement for American Technology that could be conceived would be to have a Space Shuttle at the 1983 Paris Air Show as a part of the Air and Space Bicentennial. There are undoubtedly substantial costs involved, but also benefits even harder to calculate. My question at this time is not whether we can afford it, but whether it is physically possible. As ever [signature]."

On February 17, 1983, James M. Beggs wrote back: "Dear Senator Mathias: Having a Space Shuttle Orbiter at the 1983 Paris Air Show as you suggested in your letter of December 27, would, indeed, be a tremendous advertisement for American technology. ... The only Orbiter available is the Enterprise (CV-101), that was used for the approach and landing tests in 1977. Currently, it is planned to be used by the Air Force for certain ground tests at Vandenberg Air Force Base (VAFB) starting next year. Further, the present condition of the Enterprise would require some refurbishments to make it suitable for exhibit. This of course can be done at some cost. The 747 aircraft is required, however, for each shuttle mission, and thus its availability at the time of the Air Show is dependent on the schedule. We are in the process of reassessing the schedule in the wake of the recent problem with a hydrogen leak in the Challenger. That reassessment should be completed soon. In summary, it is physically possible to provide the Enterprise (OV-101), for the Paris Air Show. Other factors, as you are already aware, such as cost and schedules, would have to be considered in making a decision. Sincerely, James M. Beggs Administrator."

Thanks to Mathias, the space shuttle Enterprise prototype was flown, in June 1983, atop the 747 Shuttle Carrier Aircraft (SCA) during the 35th Paris International Air and Space Show.

The "Americans" fenced off the Space craft until the night of the opening, when they flew it around the city at 3.000 feet for all of Paris to see. It flew over Roland Garros during the French Open. John McEnroe, who was playing in the quarter-finals, stopped playing, fell to knees, put up his hands and saluted the Space Shuttle while the crowd cheered in a standing ovation.

In December 1982, during a luncheon in Washington, Mihlon and Le Grelle came up with an idea to make the U.S. space program popular again (the launches of the Space Shuttles being relegated to the eighth page of The New York Times, for example) and to convince the American taxpayer that the 211 billion dollar project was worthwhile. The idea was to send a female schoolteacher on the Shuttle, from which she would teach children a lesson from space, a lesson that would be relayed to all the schools in the United States via the public television network PBS. Mihlon and Le Grelle discussed the idea with Mathias, who enthusiastically sold the idea to Jim Beggs and the White House. That is how Mathias originated the Teacher in Space Project (TISP).

The project was announced by President Reagan on August 27, 1984. Not being members of NASA's Astronaut Corps, the teacher and other civilian members of the crew would fly as Payload Specialists and return to their civilian jobs after flight. More than 40,000 applications were mailed to interested teachers while 11,000 teachers sent completed applications to NASA. Each application included a potential lesson that would be taught from space while on the Space Shuttle and 114 applicants were notified of their selections and were gathered together for further a further selection process that narrowed the contenders down to ten finalists. These were then trained for a time, and in 1985 NASA selected Christa McAuliffe to be the first teacher in space, with Barbara Morgan as her backup. McAuliffe was a high school social studies teacher from Concord, New Hampshire. She planned to teach two 15-minute lessons from the Space Shuttle. McAuliffe died in the Space Shuttle Challenger disaster (STS-51-L) on January 28, 1986.

== Legacy and post-Senate life ==
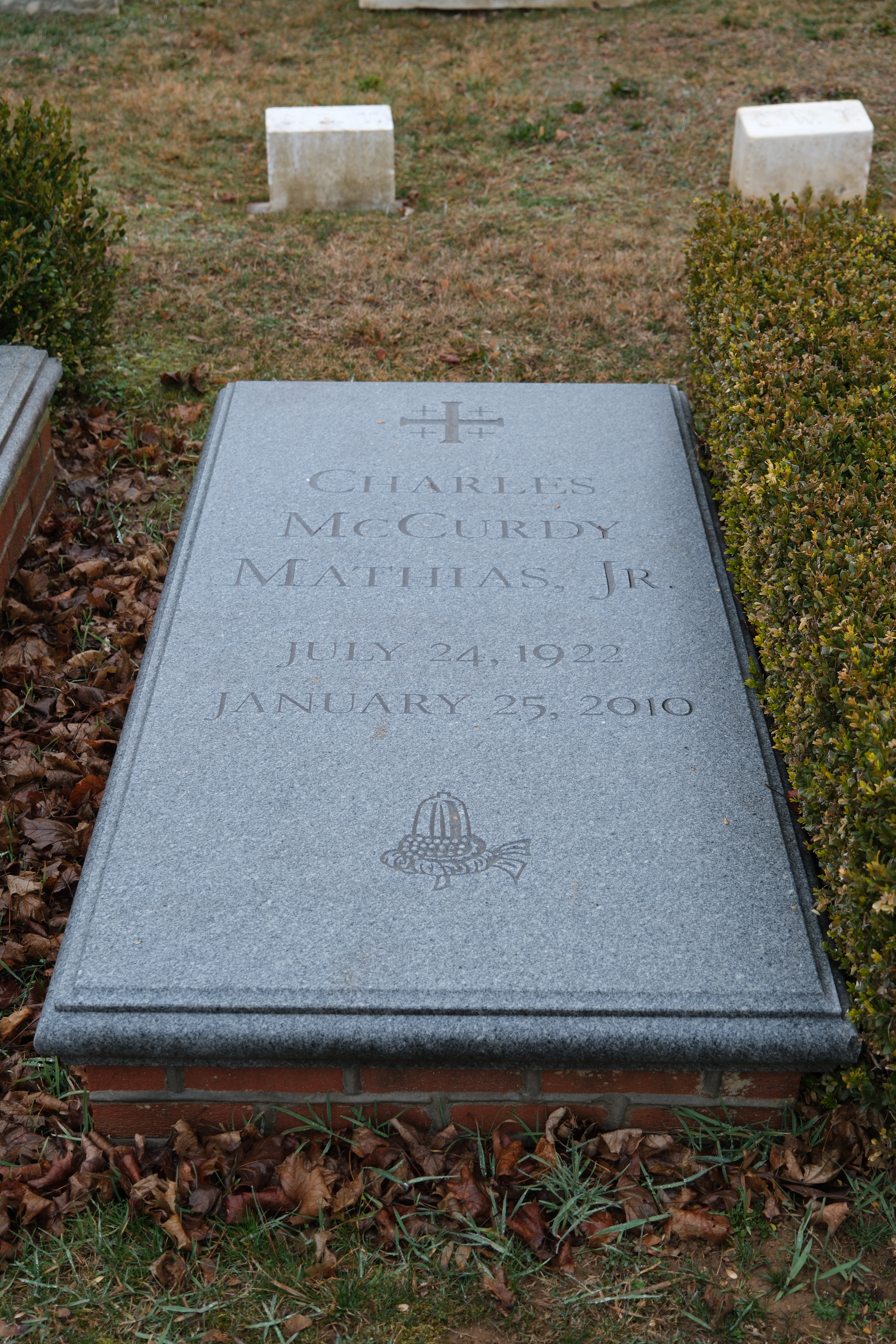
Grave of Mathias at Mount Olivet Cemetery

Mathias held a retirement party at the Baltimore Convention Center on July 14, 1986, which had over 1,200 attendees. The proceeds from the event, at $150 per person, were used to establish a foreign studies program at the Johns Hopkins University School of Advanced International Studies in his name. Mathias planned to teach at Johns Hopkins following his departure from the Senate.

Donald P. Baker of The Washington Post commented that Mathias' lasting reputation would be that of a maverick. Though he was elected to the House in 1960 as a moderate/conservative, his life in the Congress moved him to the center, and he frequently deviated from the party line and sided with Democrats. The fact that he "went out of his way to disassociate himself from [Ronald Reagan]" in the 1980 elections had hindered his chances at a chairmanship. Mathias also established a record on civil rights, having played an important role in passing a fair housing bill while he was in the House, and also in establishing a national holiday for Martin Luther King Jr. He held liberal views on abortion, defense spending, and the Equal Rights Amendment, and, along with Senator John Warner of Virginia, was one of the sponsors of a bill to authorize the construction of the Vietnam Veterans Memorial. In discussing Mathias' retirement, Tom Wicker of The New York Times commented that "he was fair, flexible, concerned, able to rise above partisanship but not above responsibility". When Wicker asked him which senators he respected the most, Mathias listed J. William Fulbright (D), Jacob Javits (R), John Sherman Cooper (R), Cliff Case (R), Phil Hart (D), Mike Mansfield (D), and George Aiken (R), because "each one of those people would take an issue on his own responsibility... They'd simply come to the conclusion that this was the right thing for the country."

Mathias was very troubled by the assassinations of President John F. Kennedy and his brother Senator Robert Kennedy. He was a member of the U.S. Senate, Select Committee to Study Governmental Operations with Respect to Intelligence Activities (the Church Committee). He played an important role in the Final Report, Book Five, "The Investigation of the Assassination of President John F. Kennedy : Performance of the Intelligence Agencies, 94th Congress, 2nd Session, 1976".

On environmental issues, Mathias established a record as a strong advocate of the Chesapeake Bay. After touring the bay shoreline in 1973, he sponsored legislation that led to a study by the United States Environmental Protection Agency (EPA) two years later, which was one of the first reports that made the public aware of harmful levels of nutrients and toxins in the waters. As a result, the report was one of the catalysts for cleanup efforts, and evolved into the Chesapeake Bay Program. In recognition, the Charles Mathias Laboratory, part of the Smithsonian Institution, was established in 1988 as a research facility to analyze human impact on the bay. In 1990, the Mathias Medal was established by Maryland Sea Grant at the University of Maryland Center for Environmental Science as further acknowledgment of Mathias' environmental record. In 2003, thirty years after he launched a study of the Chesapeake, Mathias was recognized by the Army Corps of Engineers for the influential role he played initiating restoration efforts.

From 1987 to 1993, Mathias was a partner at the law firm of Jones, Day, Reavis and Pogue. In 1991, Mathias was chosen by the U.S. Federal Reserve Board to lead a committee to supervise the operations of First American Bankshares, Inc. Prior to his arrival, First American had been secretly acquired by Bank of Credit and Commerce International, which resulted in a major banking scandal. Mathias was appointed chairman of the board of First American in November 1992, replacing former U.S. Attorney General Nicholas Katzenbach. He continued as chairman of First American until 1999.

After his retirement, Mathias served on numerous boards and committees. He was a member of the Governor's Commission on State Taxes and Tax Structure (1989–1990), a member of the Maryland Civil War Heritage Commission (1992–1995), a member of the Kaiser Commission on Medicaid and the Uninsured, co-chair of the Task Force on the Presidential Appointment and Senate Confirmation Process (1996), a member of the board of the George C. Marshall International Center, a member of the board of OpenSecrets, a member of the board of WorldSpace Satellite Radio, and board member emeritus of Brown University's Watson Institute for International Studies. Additionally, Mathias served on the Board of Trustees of Enterprise Foundation (now Enterprise Community Partners) from 1980 through 2001.

As of 2008, Mathias practiced law in Washington, D.C., and was a resident of Chevy Chase, Maryland. On October 28, 2008, Mathias endorsed Sen. Barack Obama in the 2008 presidential election.

Mathias died from complications of Parkinson's disease at his home on January 25, 2010, at age 87. He is buried in Mount Olivet Cemetery in Frederick.

U.S. House of Representatives
Preceded by John R. Foley	Member of the U.S. House of Representatives from Maryland's 6th congressional district 1961–1969	Succeeded by Glenn Beall
Party political offices
Preceded by Edward Tylor Miller	Republican nominee for U.S. Senator from Maryland (Class 3); 1968, 1974, 1980	Succeeded by Linda Chavez
U.S. Senate
Preceded by Daniel Brewster	U.S. Senator (Class 3) from Maryland; 1969–1987; Served alongside: Joseph Tydings, J. Glenn Beall Jr., Paul Sarbanes	Succeeded by Barbara Mikulski
Preceded by Claiborne Pell	Chair of the Senate Rules Committee; 1981–1987	Succeeded by Wendell H. Ford
