= 1980 United States Senate election in Maryland =

- November 4, 1980
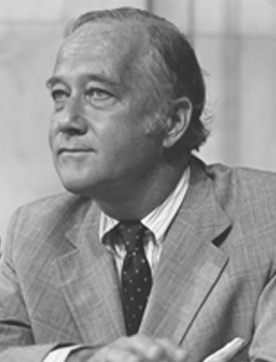

Nominee	Charles Mathias	Edward T. Conroy
Party	Republican	Democratic
Popular vote	850,970	435,118
Percentage	66.17%	33.83%
- County results Mathias: 50–60% 60–70% 70–80%
U.S. senator before election
Charles Mathias
Republican
Elected U.S. Senator
Charles Mathias
Republican

The 1980 United States Senate election in Maryland took place on November 4, 1980.

Incumbent Republican U.S Senator Charles Mathias won re-election to a third term in a landslide, defeating Democratic State Senator Edward T. Conroy.

As of 2026, this is the last time a Republican won a U.S. Senate election in Maryland. It is also the last time a Republican won Prince George's County and Baltimore City in a statewide election, and the last time a U.S. Senate candidate won every county in the state, although Barbara Mikulski won all but Garrett County in 1992 and 1998.

== Republican primary ==
=== Candidates ===
- Roscoe Bartlett
- John M. Brennan
- Jack Fortune Holden
- Charles Mathias, incumbent Senator
- V. Dallas Merrell
- Gerald G. Warren

=== Results ===
Republican Senate primary
Party	Candidate	Votes	%
Republican	Charles Mathias (incumbent)	82,430	54.96%
Republican	John M. Brennan	24,848	16.57%
Republican	V. Dallas Merrell	23,073	15.39%
Republican	Roscoe Bartlett	10,970	7.32%
Republican	Jack Fortune Holden	5,176	3.45%
Republican	Gerald G. Warren	3,476	2.32%
Total votes		149,973	100.00%

== Democratic primary ==
=== Candidates ===
- Frank J. Broschart, candidate for U.S. Representative in 1972
- Edward T. Conroy, State Senator from Bowie
- Mello Cottone
- Victor Crawford, State Senator from Silver Spring
- Robert L. Douglass, State Senator from Baltimore
- John A. Kennedy
- Dennis C. McCoy, Delegate from Baltimore
- R. Spencer Oliver, Chief of Staff of the Commission on Security and Cooperation in Europe
- David E. Shaw
- Kurt Summers
- Richard J. Taranto
- James A. Young

=== Results ===
Democratic Senate primary
Party	Candidate	Votes	%
Democratic	Edward T. Conroy	79,033	22.42%
Democratic	Victor Crawford	52,803	14.98%
Democratic	Robert L. Douglass	43,035	12.21%
Democratic	Dennis C. McCoy	40,510	11.49%
Democratic	R. Spencer Oliver	35,407	10.04%
Democratic	John A. Kennedy	20,255	5.75%
Democratic	Frank J. Broschart	19,455	5.52%
Democratic	James A. Young	17,364	4.93%
Democratic	Richard J. Taranto	12,375	3.51%
Democratic	Mello Cottone	11,461	3.25%
Democratic	David E. Shaw	10,869	3.08%
Democratic	Kurt Summers	9,952	2.82%
Total votes		352,519	100.00%

== General election ==
=== Results ===
1980 United States Senate election in Maryland
Party	Candidate	Votes	%	±%
Republican	Charles Mathias (Incumbent)	850,970	66.17%	▲8.84
Democratic	Edward T. Conroy	435,118	33.83%	▼8.84
Total votes		1,286,088	100.00%	
Republican hold		Swing		

=== Results by county ===
County	Charlies Mathias Republican		Edward T. Conroy Democratic		Margin		Total Votes Cast
County	#	%	#	%	#	%	Total Votes Cast
Allegany	18,700	73.25%	6,829	26.75%	11,871	46.50%	25,529
Anne Arundel	76,352	69.80%	33,028	30.20%	43,324	39.61%	109,380
Baltimore (City)	108,051	56.50%	83,176	43.50%	24,875	13.01%	191,227
Baltimore (County)	151,087	65.75%	78,694	34.25%	72,393	31.51%	229,781
Calvert	5,774	65.10%	3,096	34.90%	2,678	30.19%	8,870
Caroline	3,586	69.54%	1,571	30.46%	2,015	39.07%	5,157
Carroll	16,623	61.78%	10,285	38.22%	6,338	23.55%	26,908
Cecil	9,507	65.08%	5,101	34.92%	4,406	30.16%	14,608
Charles	11,308	63.32%	6,551	36.68%	4,757	26.64%	17,859
Dorchester	5,463	68.43%	2,520	31.57%	2,943	36.87%	7,983
Frederick	26,230	76.31%	8,143	23.69%	18,087	52.62%	34,373
Garrett	5,136	76.15%	1,609	23.85%	3,527	52.29%	6,745
Harford	32,805	72.31%	12,562	27.69%	20,243	44.62%	45,367
Howard	31,740	72.61%	11,970	27.39%	19,770	45.23%	43,710
Kent	3,331	70.13%	1,419	29.87%	1,912	40.25%	4,750
Montgomery	196,817	76.49%	60,506	23.51%	136,311	52.97%	257,323
Prince George's	87,311	52.33%	79,532	47.67%	7,779	4.66%	166,843
Queen Anne's	4,730	68.64%	2,161	31.36%	2,569	37.28%	6,891
St. Mary's	7,602	62.55%	4,551	37.45%	3,051	25.10%	12,153
Somerset	2,986	65.38%	1,581	34.62%	1,405	30.76%	4,567
Talbot	6,439	77.10%	1,912	22.90%	4,527	54.21%	8,351
Washington	22,460	68.73%	10,220	31.27%	12,240	37.45%	32,680
Wicomico	11,675	67.34%	5,663	32.66%	6,012	34.68%	17,338
Worcester	5,257	68.32%	2,438	31.68%	2,819	36.63%	7,695
Total	850970	66.17%	435,118	33.83%	415,852	32.33%	1,286,088

==== Counties that flipped from Democratic to Republican ====
- Baltimore (County)
- Baltimore (City)

== See also ==
- 1980 United States Senate elections
- 1980 United States elections
