= Parliamentary Assembly of the Organization for Security and Co-operation in Europe =

Parliamentary institution of the OSCE

- Logo
- Secretariat: Copenhagen, Denmark

Leaders
  - Secretary General: (Italy) Roberto Montella 2016–present
  - President: (Ukraine) Mykyta Poturaiev

Establishment
  - As the CSCE PA: 1992
  - Renamed OSCE PA: 1995
- Website www.oscepa.org

The Parliamentary Assembly of the OSCE (OSCE PA) is an institution of the Organization for Security and Co-operation in Europe. The primary task of the 323-member Assembly is to facilitate inter-parliamentary dialogue, an important aspect of the overall effort to meet the challenges of democracy throughout the OSCE area. The Parliamentary Assembly pursues objectives which are stated in the preamble of the Assembly's Rules of Procedure: assess the implementation of OSCE objectives by participating States; discuss subjects addressed during meetings of the Ministerial Council and summit meetings of OSCE Heads of State or Government; develop and promote mechanisms for the prevention and resolution of conflicts; support the strengthening and consolidation of democratic institutions in OSCE participating States; contribute to the development of OSCE institutional structures and of relations and co-operation between existing OSCE institutions.

To pursue these objectives, the OSCE Parliamentary Assembly employs a variety of means: a Final Declaration and a number of resolutions and recommendations are adopted each year at the Annual Session; committee work addresses important contemporary international issues; different programmes, including an extensive Election Observation Programme, and various seminars, have been designed to develop and strengthen democracy; and delegations are sent on special missions to areas of latent or active crisis.

The Parliamentary Assembly was originally established by the 1990 Paris Summit to promote greater involvement in the OSCE by national parliaments of the participating States. By passing resolutions and issuing formal recommendations to the OSCE's governmental side and to parliaments, it aims to pursue the implementation of OSCE objectives by participating States, including through legislative action.

In July 2024, the Russian State Duma and Federation Council voted to suspend participation in the Parliamentary Assembly.

== Parliamentary Committees and Groups ==
The three General Committees correspond to the three main sections of the Helsinki Final Act: the General Committee on Political Affairs and Security; the General Committee on Economic Affairs, Science, Technology and Environment; and the General Committee on Democracy, Human Rights and Humanitarian Questions.

The Standing Committee consists of Heads of National Delegations to the OSCE Parliamentary Assembly and the Members of the Bureau. The Standing Committee and the Bureau prepare the work of the Assembly between sessions and ensure the efficient operation of the Assembly.

Several other committees and groups address specific issues or areas that can benefit from parliamentary attention. The Standing Committee has approved the creation of bodies to work on problems in Belarus and Moldova as well as to address the need for greater transparency and accountability in the OSCE. Currently, there are two ad hoc committees of the Assembly: the Ad Hoc Committee on Countering Terrorism and the Ad Hoc Committee on Migration.

== Election observation ==
At the OSCE Parliamentary Assembly's Annual Session in Helsinki (1993) the then Chairperson-in-Office, Swedish Foreign Minister Baroness Margaretha af Ugglas, urged parliamentarians to actively participate in election observation and monitoring. In response to this call, the OSCE Parliamentary Assembly has developed a particularly active programme for observing elections in the OSCE area.

Since 1993, thousands of parliamentarians have observed elections in more than 30 countries.

== President of the Parliamentary Assembly of the OSCE ==
At each Annual Session the OSCE Parliamentary Assembly elects a president who acts as the highest representative of the Assembly, appoints Special Representatives on topics of concern, recommends to the OSCE Chairman-in-Office leaders of OSCE election observation missions, and presides over meetings of the Assembly. The president is elected for one year and can be re-elected for an additional one-year term. There have been 21 presidents of the Parliamentary Assembly, including the current president, Mykyta Poturaiev of Ukraine.

== Presidents and Secretaries General ==
Presidents

- (Finland) Ilkka Suominen (1992–1994)
- (Belgium) Frank Swaelen (1994–1996)
- (Spain) Javier Ruperez (1996–1998)
- (Denmark) Helle Degn (1998–2000)
- (Romania) Adrian Severin (2000–2002)
- (United Kingdom) Bruce George (2002–2004)
- (United States) Alcee L. Hastings (2004–2006)
- (Sweden) Göran Lennmarker (2006–2008)
- (Portugal) Joao Soares (2008–2010)
- (Greece) Petros Efthymiou (2010–2012)
- (Italy) Riccardo Migliori (2012–2013)
- (Austria) Wolfgang Grossruck (2013)
- (Montenegro) Ranko Krivokapić (2013–2014)
- (Finland) Ilkka Kanerva (2014–2016)
- (Austria) Christine Muttonen (2016–2017)
- (Georgia (country)) Gigi Tsereteli (2017–2020)
- (United Kingdom) Peter Lord Bowness (2020–2021)
- (Sweden) Margareta Cederfelt (2021–2023)
- (Finland) Pia Kauma (2023–2025)
- (Spain) Pere Joan Pons (2025-2026)
- (Ukraine) Mykyta Poturaiev (2026-)

Secretaries General

- (United States) Robert Spencer Oliver (1992–2015)
- (Italy) Roberto Montella (2016–)
