= Linda Chavez =

American politician (born 1947)

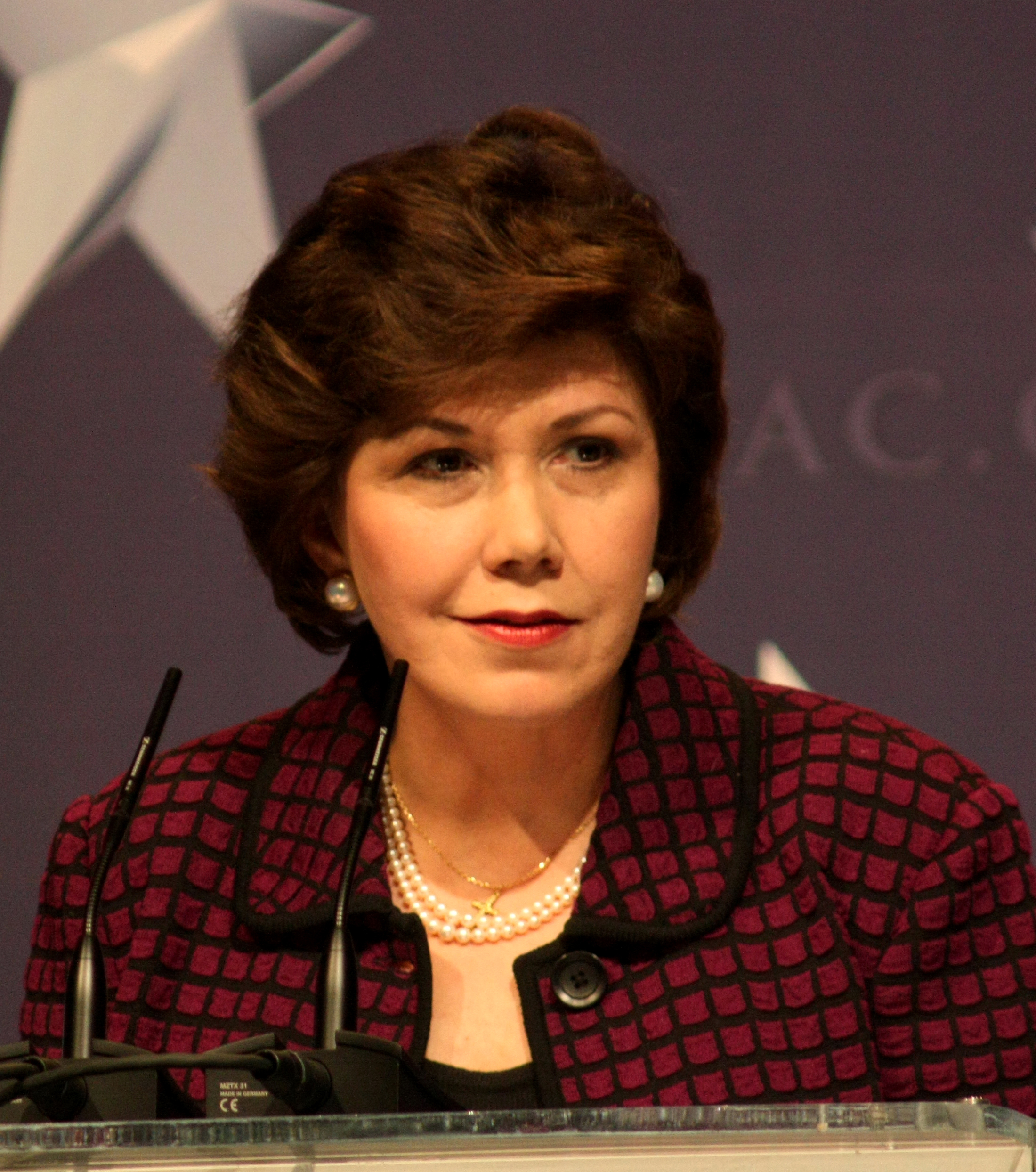

7th Director of the Office of Public Liaison
- In office April 8, 1985 – February 4, 1986
- President: Ronald Reagan
- Preceded by: Faith Whittlesey
- Succeeded by: Mari Maseng

Personal details
- Born: Linda Lou Chavez; June 17, 1947 (age 79) Albuquerque, New Mexico, U.S.
- Party: Democratic (before 1985); Republican (1985–2020); Independent (2020–present)
- Spouse: Christopher Gersten
- Children: 3
- Education: University of Colorado, Boulder (BA); University of California, Los Angeles (attended)

Linda Lou Chavez (born June 17, 1947) is an American author, commentator, and radio talk show host. She is also a Fox News analyst, chair of the Center for Equal Opportunity, has a syndicated column that appears in newspapers nationwide each week, and sits on the board of directors of two Fortune 500 companies: Pilgrim's Pride and ABM Industries. Chavez was the highest-ranking woman in President Ronald Reagan's White House, and was the first Latina ever nominated to the United States Cabinet, when President George W. Bush nominated her Secretary of Labor. She withdrew from consideration for the position when the media published allegations that she had employed an illegal immigrant a decade earlier. In 2000, Chavez was named a Living Legend by the Library of Congress. She is currently vice chair of the Renew Democracy Initiative, a cross-partisan non-profit.

== Early life and family ==
Chavez was born in Albuquerque, New Mexico, the daughter of Velma Lucy (née McKenna) and Rudolfo Enrique Chavez, a tail gunner in World War II who worked as a house painter. She is of Neomexicana descent on her father's side. Her father was descended from immigrants to New Spain from Spain in the 1500s; his family had lived in the New Mexico area for several hundred years, his ancestor Diego de Montoya (born in Texcoco, New Spain, in 1596) was the leader of an encomienda, an enslaved protectorate of Puebloan peoples in Pueblo San Pedro in New Mexico. Another ancestor of Chavez is Mexican politician and general Manuel Armijo who served as governor of the Mexican territory of New Mexico, then as a general of the Mexican Army, surrendering to U.S. forces in the Mexican–American War. Her mother was of English and Irish ancestry. Chavez earned a Bachelor of Arts degree from the University of Colorado in 1970. She attended graduate school at UCLA.

She is married to Christopher Gersten, former Bush Administration official, and is the mother of three adult sons, David, Pablo, and Rudy. She is a grandmother of nine and resides with her family in Boulder, Colorado. Chavez was raised Catholic and converted to Judaism on June 9, 1967, when marrying her husband. Chavez said in 1986 that she was never a practicing Jew, and that the conversion papers were signed simply to allow the wedding ceremony to take place. She said she was "an on-again, off-again practicing Catholic." Some of Chavez's distant paternal ancestors had been Conversos (Sephardic Jews who converted to Catholicism, usually under duress).

== Background with labor unions ==
Starting in 1975, Chavez was employed within the inner circles of the United States second largest teachers' union, the American Federation of Teachers, where she was responsible for editing that organization's publications. She was a confidante of Al Shanker, the AFT's president. While she believed in President Shanker's personal philosophy of trade unionism, she eventually came to feel that many in the organization were intent on moving the union in another direction after Shanker's inevitable departure. She later wrote that the more she learned about the goals of these newer union leaders, the less comfortable she felt in the organization. She left the AFT in 1983.

== Career in Republican administrations ==
Chavez has held a number of appointed positions, among them White House Director of Public Liaison (1985), under President Ronald Reagan; Staff Director of the U.S. Commission on Civil Rights (1983–1985) appointed by President Reagan; and Chairman of the National Commission on Migrant Education (1988–1992) under President George H. W. Bush. Concurrently with some of these positions she served as a member of the Administrative Conference of the United States (1984–1986) under President Reagan.

In 1992, Chavez was elected by the United Nations Human Rights Commission to serve a four-year term as U.S. Expert to the U.N. Sub-commission on the Prevention of Discrimination and Protection of Minorities. In August 1993, the sub-commission asked Chavez to study systematic rape, sexual slavery and slavery-like practices during wartime, including internal armed conflict. As Special Rapporteur, Chavez reported regularly for nearly four years to different sub-commission meetings. In May 1997, Chavez asked that the final report be finished and delivered by a colleague, and was granted permission to withdraw from the project. (On June 22, 1998, her successor, Gay McDougall, released the final version of "Contemporary Forms of Slavery".)

Chavez was the head of Governor George W. Bush's task force on immigration when he ran for president in 2000, and she later met with him on a number of occasions while he was president to discuss immigration reform.

=== Secretary of Labor nomination ===
In 2001, President George W. Bush nominated Chavez for Secretary of Labor. She was the first Hispanic woman nominated to a United States cabinet position.

However, she withdrew from consideration after it was revealed, through her neighbor Margaret "Peggy" Zwisler, that she had given money to Marta Mercado, an illegal immigrant from Guatemala who lived in her home more than a decade earlier. Mercado was given room and board in Chavez's Bethesda home, in addition she was said by columnist Roger Simon to have been given "$100 to $150... every few weeks" for performing household chores for Chavez such as "vacuuming, laundry, cleaning and child care." Chavez withdrew as President Bush's nominee but stated she never felt pressure from Bush's political team to do so. Chavez has always maintained that she knew Mercado was in the United States illegally, stating "I think I always knew."

== Run for U.S. Senate ==
In 1986, Chavez left her post as the highest ranking woman in Ronald Reagan's White House in an attempt to win the Senate seat in Maryland being vacated by retiring three-term liberal Republican Charles Mathias. She ran as a Republican against Democrat Barbara Mikulski. The election was the second time in modern U.S. history that two women faced each other in a statewide general election. The race was covered by national media, with observers noting that Chavez was very unlikely to win.

In the campaign, Chavez attacked Mikulski, a lifelong Baltimore resident, as a "San Francisco-style, George McGovern, liberal Democrat." Chavez was accused of making Mikulski's sexual orientation a central issue of the political campaign. Chavez wrote that the term referred to Jeane Kirkpatrick's 1984 Republican National Convention "Blame America First" speech, in which she coined the phrase "San Francisco Liberal" in reference to the Democratic National Convention in San Francisco. Using political advertisements and press conferences, Chavez attacked Mikulski's former aide Teresa Brennan as "anti-male" and a "radical feminist", a tactic that Victor Kamber observed to be implying that Brennan and Mikulski were radical lesbians, and that "fascist feminism" was Mikulski's political philosophy. Mikulski did not respond in kind to the barbs. She defeated Chavez with 61% of the vote.

== Columnist and commentator ==
Beginning July 1, 1990, Chavez was paired with Bonnie Erbé in the "Our Turn" op-ed column syndicated by Universal Press Syndicate. From opposing ideological viewpoints, the two columnists addressed topics of current interest, questions such as whether the glass ceiling was a myth, whether American women should serve in combat, and whether surrogate motherhood should be banned. In 1991, Erbé, Chavez and the "Our Turn" column were picked up by Creators Syndicate. They continued to field polarizing political questions related to women and gender such as whether men's clubs should continue to be allowed to exclude women.

External videos
- Booknotes interview with Chavez on Out of the Barrio, March 22, 1992, C-SPAN

Chavez published her first book, Out of the Barrio: Toward a New Politics of Hispanic Assimilation, in 1991. She wrote that American Hispanics should not have followed the same path as African Americans, seeking compensation for discrimination via affirmative action. She wrote that Hispanics should assimilate themselves and use the English language in mainstream society.

Chavez quit PBS's To the Contrary after a May 12, 2000, incident when the host, Erbé, made the claim on air that, at her age, Chavez was more likely to be hit by lightning than raped. The comment was made during a discussion on gun control and whether it was necessary for Chavez to obtain a gun to defend herself against a potential rape. Chavez produced statistics to show she was more likely to be raped than hit by lightning. Erbe responded: "I think your reaction (especially looking up the stats on lightning strikes) goes beyond histrionic ... I must say I'm shocked at your reaction. I thought you were a much bigger, more mature person than you're showing yourself to be." Chavez and Erbé argued on the opposite sides of the gun ownership issue. After an absence of more than seven years, Chavez returned to the program on January 18, 2008 and is listed as a panelist on its website.

In early January 2001 Chavez stopped writing her column because she was in consideration for the position of Secretary of Labor. After withdrawing under controversy, she resumed her affiliation with the syndicate. Richard Newcombe, president of Creators Syndicate, said that he thought the controversy and exposure would be good for Chavez's writing career.

Chavez is currently a syndicated columnist with Creators Syndicate and a Fox News political commentator. She frequently appears on a number of national news programs, including The O'Reilly Factor, the Glenn Beck show, Hannity and Colmes, The Rush Limbaugh Show, Good Morning America, The Newshour with Jim Lehrer, and Fox and Friends. She has previously been a regularly panelist on The McLaughlin Group, Crossfire, and Eye on Washington. She has guest-hosted several shows, including Hannity and Colmes, sitting in for Sean Hannity, and To the Contrary, sitting in for Erbé.

== Political action committees and non-profit foundations ==
In 1986, Chavez became president of U.S. English, a non-profit dedicated to establishing English as the official language of the United States. She resigned in 1988 following comments by co-founder John Tanton which she regarded as "anti-Hispanic" and "anti-Catholic".

Chavez is the founder and chairwoman of the Center for Equal Opportunity, a conservative think tank which focuses on three specific areas: affirmative action, immigration, and bilingual education. In 2007, the Washington Post reported that between 1997 and 2003, her salary from that foundation ranged from $125,000 to $136,000. In 2004, the last year for which records were available to the Post, she was paid $70,000; that year the foundation also paid her son David $83,000. From 1998 to 2001, her husband, Chris Gersten, was paid $64,000 a year from the Institute for Religious Values, another foundation she helped start. By comparison, between 2003 and 2006, the two foundations, plus two others founded by Chavez and her family, raised about $350,000 per year, combined. Chavez said that "I guess you could call it the family business."

The Post also reported that Chavez and her family, through political action committees they had created, including the Republican Issues Committee, the Latino Alliance, Stop Union Political Abuse, and the Pro-Life Campaign Committee had further family income. In 2001, the PACs paid Chavez's husband $77,000, her son Pablo $25,000, and her son David about $10,000. Then, from 2002 through 2006, the PACs paid Chavez and her family $261,000. The PACs raised $24.5 million from January 2003 to December 2006, with a total of $242,000 of that money being given to politicians.

According to campaign finance records, the Pro-Life Campaign Committee was fined $150,000 in May 2006 for failing to file accurate records with the Federal Election Commission (FEC). In 2006, Latino Alliance negotiated a $2,500 settlement with the FEC for filing incomplete records. In 2007, the Republican Issues Committee paid a $110,000 fine for failing to disclose hundreds of thousands of dollars in contributions and expenditures.

In January 2008, Chavez and her husband said that they planned to shut down all of their PACs.

== Affiliations ==
Chavez has been a Director of two Fortune 1000 companies, Pilgrim's Pride (to 2008) and ABM Industries. She is President of the Becoming American Institute. Pilgrim's Pride is the largest poultry producer in the United States, and ABM Industries is the 2nd largest property management company in the United States. Chavez is a past board member of Greyhound Lines as well as the Foundation for Teaching Economics.

Chavez sits on the Boards of several non-profit organizations, including the National Campaign to Prevent Teen Pregnancy, and was named to the advisory board of the Bruin Alumni Association.

== Awards and recognitions ==
In 2000, Chavez was named a Library of Congress Living Legend.

== Writings ==
- Out of the Barrio: Toward a New Politics of Hispanic Assimilation. Basic Books. 1991. ISBN 0-465-05431-5.
- An Unlikely Conservative: The Transformation of an Ex-Liberal (Or How I Became the Most Hated Hispanic in America). Basic Books. 2002. ISBN 0-4650-8903-8.
- With Gray, Daniel (2004). Betrayal: How Union Bosses Shake Down Their Members and Corrupt American Politics. Crown Forum. ISBN 1-4000-5259-9.
- "Donald Trump's America". Commentary Magazine: 13–19. October 13, 2015. ISSN 0010-2601. (PDF version)

== See also ==
- Unsuccessful nominations to the Cabinet of the United States

Political offices
Preceded by Faith Whittlesey	Director of the Office of Public Liaison; 1985–1986	Succeeded by Mari Maseng
Party political offices
Preceded by Charles Mathias	Republican nominee for U.S. Senator from Maryland (Class 3); 1986	Succeeded by Alan Keyes
