= Pia Kauma =

Finnish politician (born 1966)

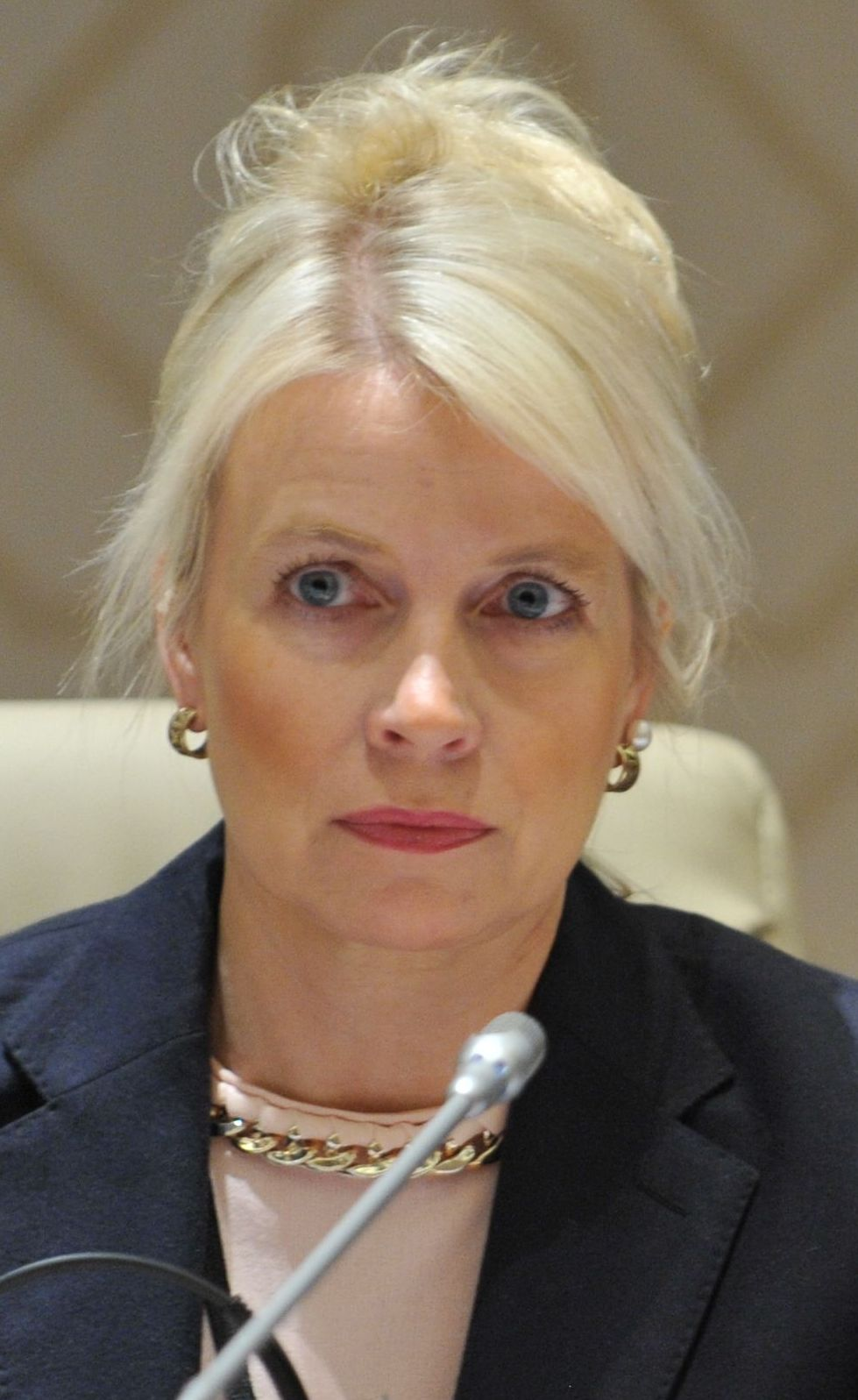
- Kauma in 2014
- Born: Pia Liisa Kauma; 20 October 1966 (age 59); Joensuu, Finland
- Occupation: Member of the Finnish parliament

Pia Liisa Kauma (born 20 October 1966) is a Finnish politician, who serves as a Member of the Finnish parliament. She also serves as a member of the City Council of Espoo, representing the National Coalition Party. Kauma is also a member of the Finnish delegation of the Parliamentary Assembly of the Organization for Security and Co-operation in Europe and currently serves as the president of the organization.

== Political career ==
Kauma was a member of the Finnish Parliament between 2011 and 2015, and was re-elected in 2017. With an education in economics and business, she has served in the Parliament on the Commerce Committee, the Social Affairs and Health Committee, the Grand Committee, the Constitutional Law Committee, and the Environment Committee.

In addition to her Presidency of the OSCE PA, Kauma was a member of the Finnish OSCE PA delegation between 2011 and 2015 and an alternate member between 2017 and 2019, and has been a member since 2019. She served as the rapporteur of the General Committee on Political Affairs and Security between 2013 and 2014, and has participated in numerous election observation missions.

Kauma was appointed as Special Representative on Central Asia Engagement in August 2021 and previously served as Special Representative on Civil Society Engagement.

Kauma also serves as the chairman of parliamentary friendship groups of the Finnish parliament for Spain and France.

== Other activities ==
Kauma is a member of the Stakeholder Advisory Board of Fortum, the Representative Council of HOK-Elanto and the management board of Fennia group.

== Personal life ==
Kauma is married to Jussi Kauma, with whom she has four children.
