= Senator Mathis =

Senator Mathis may also refer to:

- Liz Mathis (born 1958), Iowa State Senator
- Thomas A. Mathis (1869–1958), New Jersey State Senator and political boss
- W. Steelman Mathis (1898–1981), New Jersey State Senator

== See also ==
- Senator Mathias (disambiguation)
