= John R. Foley =

American politician

John Foley
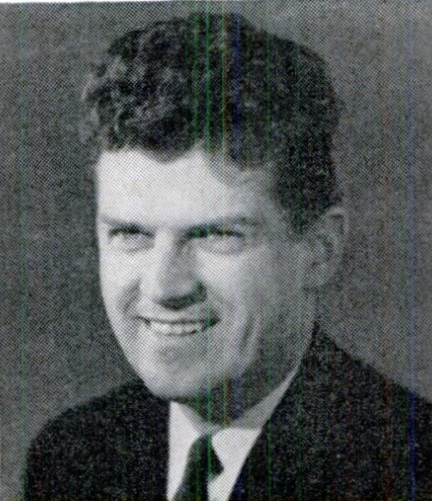

Member of the U.S. House of Representatives from Maryland's 6th district
- In office January 3, 1959 – January 3, 1961
- Preceded by: DeWitt Hyde
- Succeeded by: Charles Mathias

Personal details
- Born: John Robert Foley; October 16, 1917 Wabasha, Minnesota, U.S.
- Died: November 11, 2001 (aged 84) Kensington, Maryland, U.S.
- Party: Democratic
- Education: St. Thomas College (BA); Georgetown University (LLB); Catholic University (LLM)

Military service
- Branch/service: United States Army
- Years of service: 1941–1946
- Battles/wars: World War II

John Robert Foley (October 16, 1917 – November 11, 2001) was an American attorney and politician who served as a member of the United States House of Representatives for Maryland's 6th congressional district from 1959 to 1961.

== Early life and education ==
Foley was born in Wabasha, Minnesota, the grandson of Irish immigrants, and graduated from St. Felix High School in 1935. After he received his Bachelor of Arts degree from the St. Thomas College in 1940, he joined the United States Army following the start of World War II, serving from 1941 to 1946. He received his LL.B. degree from Georgetown University Law Center in 1947, and received his L.L.M. degree from Columbus School of Law in 1950.

== Career ==
After school, Foley became a lawyer in private practice. He was also a professor, and was elected judge of the Orphan's (Probate) Court of Montgomery County, Maryland, serving from 1954 to 1958. He was an unsuccessful Democratic candidate for election to Congress in 1956, but was elected as a Democrat to Congress two years later, serving one term from January 3, 1959, to January 3, 1961. Foley voted in favor of the Civil Rights Act of 1960. He tried two further times for election in 1960 and 1962, but was unsuccessful both times.

== Personal life ==
He died from a heart attack in Kensington, Maryland in November 2001.

U.S. House of Representatives
Preceded by DeWitt Hyde	Member of the U.S. House of Representatives from Maryland's 6th congressional district 1959 – 1961	Succeeded by Charles Mathias, Jr.
