= 1974 United States Senate election in Maryland =

- November 5, 1974
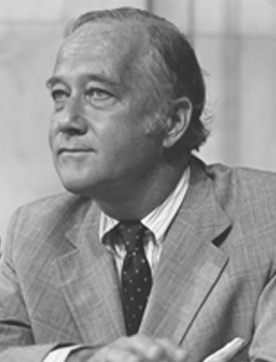

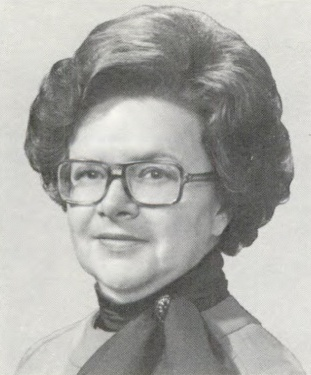
Nominee	Charles Mathias	Barbara Mikulski
Party	Republican	Democratic
Popular vote	503,223	374,663
Percentage	57.32%	42.68%
- County results Mathias: 50–60% 60–70% 70–80% Mikulski: 50–60%
U.S. senator before election
Charles Mathias Jr.
Republican
Elected U.S. Senator
Charles Mathias Jr.
Republican

The 1974 United States Senate election in Maryland was held on November 5, 1974, to elect one of Maryland's members to the United States Senate. Incumbent Republican U.S. Senator Charles Mathias Jr. won re-election to a second term, defeating Baltimore City Councilwoman Barbara Mikulski, who won the Senate election 12 years later for this same seat upon Mathias' retirement.

This election marks the last time either party won a race for Maryland's Class 3 US Senate seat with less than 60% of the vote.

== Background ==
As a Republican representing heavily Democratic Maryland, Mathias faced a potentially difficult re-election bid for the 1974 election. State Democrats nominated Barbara Mikulski, then a Baltimore city councilwoman who was well-known to residents in her city as a social activist, but with limited name recognition in the rest of the state. Mathias was renominated by Republicans, fending off a primary election challenge from conservative doctor Ross Pierpont. Pierpont was never a substantial threat to Mathias, whose lack of competition was due in part to fallout from the Watergate scandal.

As an advocate for campaign finance reform, Mathias refused to accept any contribution over $100 to "avoid the curse of big money that has led to so much trouble in the last year". However, he still managed to raise over $250,000, nearly five times Mikulski's total. Ideologically, Mikulski and Mathias agreed on many issues, such as closing tax loopholes and easing taxes on the middle class. On two issues, however, Mathias argued to reform Congress and the U.S. tax system to address inflation and corporate price fixing, contrary to Mikulski. In retrospect, The Washington Post felt the election was "an intelligent discussion of state, national, and foreign affairs by two smart, well-informed people".

== General election ==
=== Candidates ===
- Charles McCurdy Mathias, Jr. (R), incumbent U.S. senator
- Barbara A. Mikulski (D), Baltimore city councilwoman

=== Results ===
United States Senate election in Maryland, 1974
Party	Candidate	Votes	%
Republican	Charles Mathias (inc.)	503,223	57.3
Democratic	Barbara A. Mikulski	374,663	42.7
Invalid or blank votes			
Total votes		877,886	100.00
Turnout			
Republican hold			

=== Results by county ===
County	Charlies Mathias Republican		Barbara Mikulski Democratic		Margin		Total votes cast
County	#	%	#	%	#	%	Total votes cast
Allegany	15893	76.21%	4962	23.79%	10931	52.41%	20855
Anne Arundel	39180	57.97%	28404	42.03%	10776	15.94%	67584
Baltimore (City)	57331	40.10%	85625	59.90%	-28294	-19.79%	142956
Baltimore (County)	86651	49.09%	89866	50.91%	-3215	-1.82%	176517
Calvert	3023	60.81%	1948	39.19%	1075	21.63%	4971
Caroline	2034	61.75%	1260	38.25%	774	23.50%	3294
Carroll	10102	67.50%	4865	32.50%	5237	34.99%	14967
Cecil	5685	58.16%	4090	41.84%	1595	16.32%	9775
Charles	6270	60.53%	4088	39.47%	2182	21.07%	10358
Dorchester	3472	61.97%	2131	38.03%	1341	23.93%	5603
Frederick	16938	79.39%	4397	20.61%	12541	58.78%	21335
Garrett	4197	76.55%	1286	23.45%	2911	53.09%	5483
Harford	15182	53.72%	13077	46.28%	2105	7.45%	28259
Howard	14561	59.44%	9938	40.56%	4623	18.87%	24499
Kent	2824	64.43%	1559	35.57%	1265	28.86%	4383
Montgomery	114850	69.99%	49239	30.01%	65611	39.99%	164089
Prince George's	64443	57.85%	46961	42.15%	17482	15.69%	111404
Queen Anne's	2111	53.34%	1847	46.66%	264	6.67%	3958
St. Mary's	5012	61.21%	3176	38.79%	1836	22.42%	8188
Somerset	2631	57.28%	1962	42.72%	669	14.57%	4593
Talbot	3744	63.96%	2110	36.04%	1634	27.91%	5854
Washington	16690	74.09%	5837	25.91%	10853	48.18%	22527
Wicomico	7353	63.61%	4206	36.39%	3147	27.23%	11559
Worcester	3046	62.48%	1829	37.52%	1217	24.96%	4875
Total	503223	57.32%	374663	42.68%	128560	14.64%	877886

==== Counties that flipped from Democratic to Republican ====
- Charles
- St. Mary's

==== Counties that flipped from Republican to Democratic ====
- Baltimore (County)

== See also ==
- 1974 United States Senate elections
- 1974 United States elections
