= 1986 United States Senate election in Maryland =

- November 4, 1986
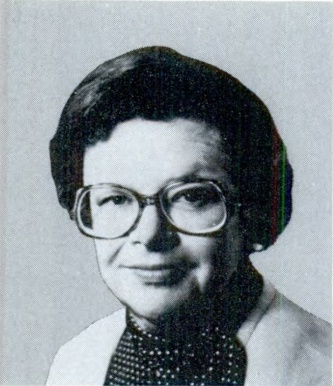

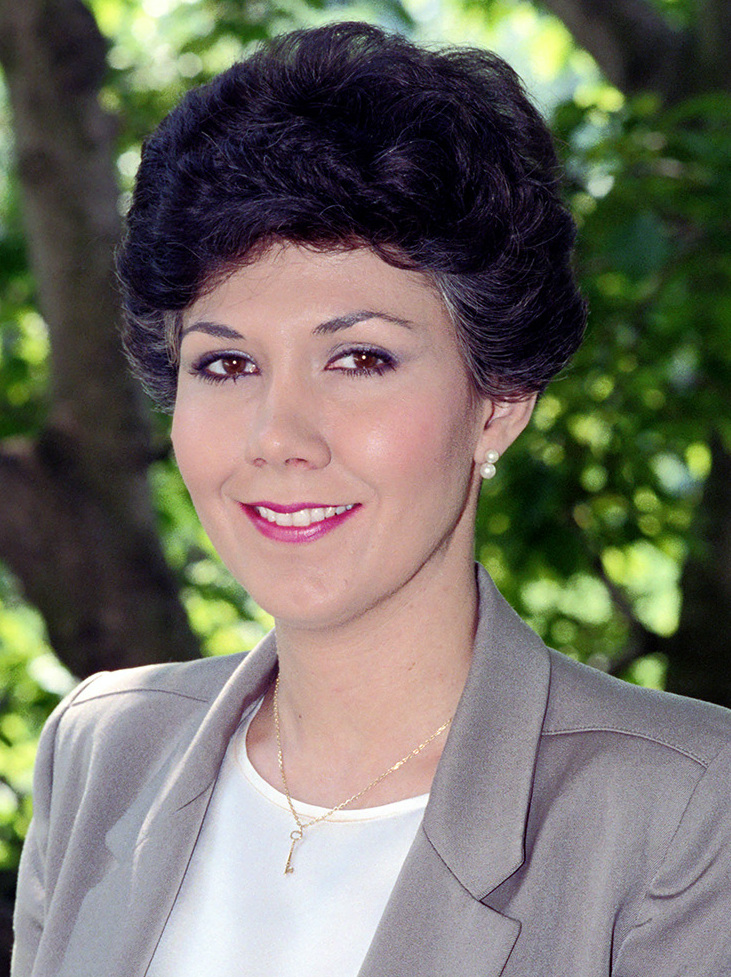
Nominee	Barbara Mikulski	Linda Chavez
Party	Democratic	Republican
Popular vote	675,225	437,411
Percentage	60.69%	39.31%
- County results Mikulski: 50–60% 60–70% 80–90% Chavez: 50–60% 60–70%
U.S. senator before election
Charles Mathias Jr.
Republican
Elected U.S. Senator
Barbara Mikulski
Democratic

The 1986 United States Senate election in Maryland was held on November 4, 1986. Incumbent Republican Senator Charles Mathias Jr. decided to retire instead of seeking a fourth term. Democratic U.S. Representative Barbara Mikulski defeated Reagan Administration official Linda Chavez for the open seat. Mikulski's swearing-in marked the first time since 1969 where Democrats held both Senate seats from Maryland.

== Democratic primary ==
=== Candidates ===
- Barbara Mikulski, U.S. Congresswoman and nominee for Senator in 1974
- Michael D. Barnes, U.S. Congressman
- Harry Hughes, Governor of Maryland
- Debra Hanania Freeman
- Edward M. Olszewski
- A. Robert Kaufman, social organizer
- Boyd E. Sweatt, perennial candidate
- Leonard E. Trout, Jr.

=== Results ===
Democratic primary results by county: Map legend: Mikulski—30–40%; Mikulski—40–50%; Mikulski—50–60%; Mikulski—60–70%; Barnes—30–40%; Barnes—40–50%; Barnes—70–80%; Hughes—30–40%

Democratic primary results
Party	Candidate	Votes	%
Democratic	Barbara A. Mikulski	307,876	49.50%
Democratic	Michael D. Barnes	195,086	31.37%
Democratic	Harry Hughes	88,908	14.30%
Democratic	Debra Hanania Freeman	9,350	1.50%
Democratic	Edward M. Olszewski	7,877	1.27%
Democratic	A. Robert Kaufman	6,505	1.05%
Democratic	Boyd E. Sweatt	3,580	0.58%
Democratic	Leonard E. Trout, Jr.	2,742	0.44%
Total votes		621,924	100.00%

== Republican primary ==
=== Candidates ===
- Linda Chavez, Assistant to the President for Public Liaison
- Mike Schaefer, former San Diego city councilman
- George Haley, former Kansas State Senator
- Melvin Perkins, perennial candidate
- Nicholas T. Nonnenmacher
- Richard Sullivan
- Howard D. Greyber, perennial candidate
- Monroe Cornish, perennial candidate
- Herbert Stone Rosenberg
- Horace Stuart Rich
- Abraham H. Kalish

=== Results ===
Republican primary results by county: Map legend: Chavez—70–80%; Chavez—80–90%; Chavez—>90%

Republican primary results
Party	Candidate	Votes	%
Republican	Linda Chavez	100,888	73.07%
Republican	Michael Schaefer	16,902	12.24%
Republican	George Haley	5,808	4.21%
Republican	Melvin Perkins	2,785	2.02%
Republican	Nicholas T. Nonnenmacher	2,751	1.99%
Republican	Richard Sullivan	2,328	1.69%
Republican	Howard D. Greyber	1,678	1.22%
Republican	Monroe Cornish	1,497	1.08%
Republican	Herbert Stone Rosenberg	1,337	0.97%
Republican	Horace Stuart Rich	1,199	0.87%
Republican	Abraham H. Kalish	901	0.65%
Total votes		138,074	100.00%

== General election ==
=== Candidates ===
- Linda Chavez (R), Assistant to the President for Public Liaison
- Barbara Mikulski (D), U.S. Congresswoman

=== Campaign ===
Mathias announced his retirement from politics. At the time of this announcement, it was expected that then-Governor Harry Hughes would run for the seat being vacated by retiring Senator Mathias. However, Hughes became caught up in the aftermath of the Maryland savings and loan crisis. He lost popularity with voters, opening the door for Mikulski's bid for the Senate.

Chavez won the primary handily, defeating several Republican challengers. Later, she made comments that some Mikulski supporters interpreted as an attempt to draw attention to the issue of Mikulski's sexual orientation. In an article quoting Chavez's claim that Mikulski was a "San Francisco-style, George McGovern, liberal Democrat", The Washington Post reported that Chavez was directly implying that the never-married Mikulski was a lesbian. Chavez was accused of making Mikulski's sexual orientation a central issue of the political campaign. In defending her use of the phrase, Chavez stated the line "San Francisco Democrats" was a reference to Jeane Kirkpatrick's 1984 Republican National Convention "Blame America First" speech, in which Kirkpatrick coined the phrase "San Francisco Liberal.". The phrase "San Francisco liberal" was common at the time.

Mikulski never directly responded to the issue and eventually won the race with 61 percent of the vote. She was the first female Democrat elected to the U.S. Senate in her own right (not appointed or filling a seat of a deceased husband).

=== Results ===
United States Senate election in Maryland, 1986
Party	Candidate	Votes	%	±%
Democratic	Barbara A. Mikulski	675,225	60.69%	+26.85%
Republican	Linda Chavez	437,411	39.31%	−26.85%
Majority		237,814	21.37%	−10.96%
Total votes		1,112,636	100.00%	
Democratic gain from Republican		Swing		

=== Results by county ===
County	Barbara A. Mikulski Democratic		Linda Chavez Republican		Margin		Total Votes Cast
County	#	%	#	%	#	%	Total Votes Cast
Allegany	8845	45.05%	10790	54.95%	-1945	-9.91%	19635
Anne Arundel	54936	54.14%	46536	45.86%	8400	8.28%	101472
Baltimore (City)	137775	82.65%	28926	17.35%	108849	65.30%	166701
Baltimore (County)	126914	62.30%	76785	37.70%	50129	24.61%	203699
Calvert	5420	50.23%	5371	49.77%	49	0.45%	10791
Caroline	2241	45.04%	2735	54.96%	-494	-9.93%	4976
Carroll	11659	43.20%	15329	56.80%	-3670	-13.60%	26988
Cecil	6879	48.47%	7312	51.53%	-433	-3.05%	14191
Charles	8958	50.82%	8670	49.18%	288	1.63%	17628
Dorchester	3562	47.18%	3988	52.82%	-426	-5.64%	7550
Frederick	13153	44.29%	16547	55.71%	-3394	-11.43%	29700
Garrett	1908	33.26%	3829	66.74%	-1921	-33.48%	5737
Harford	21534	52.91%	19168	47.09%	2366	5.81%	40702
Howard	25723	57.57%	18960	42.43%	6763	15.14%	44683
Kent	2791	54.13%	2365	45.87%	426	8.26%	5156
Montgomery	117058	59.26%	80469	40.74%	36589	18.52%	197527
Prince George's	85536	66.76%	42585	33.24%	42951	33.52%	128121
Queen Anne's	3915	49.14%	4052	50.86%	-137	-1.72%	7967
St. Mary's	6484	53.32%	5676	46.68%	808	6.64%	12160
Somerset	2566	43.65%	3312	56.35%	-746	-12.69%	5878
Talbot	3712	43.12%	4896	56.88%	-1184	-13.75%	8608
Washington	12181	44.81%	15005	55.19%	-2824	-10.39%	27186
Wicomico	7463	44.54%	9291	55.46%	-1828	-10.91%	16754
Worcester	4016	45.44%	4822	54.56%	-806	-9.12%	8838
Total	675229	60.69%	437419	39.31%	237810	21.37%	1112648

==== Counties that flipped from Republican to Democratic ====
- Anne Arundel
- Baltimore (County)
- Baltimore (City)
- Calvert
- Charles
- Harford
- Howard
- Kent
- Montgomery
- Prince George's
- St. Mary's

== See also ==
- 1986 United States Senate elections
- 1986 United States elections
