= Roberto Montella =

Secretary General of the OSCE Parliamentary Assembly

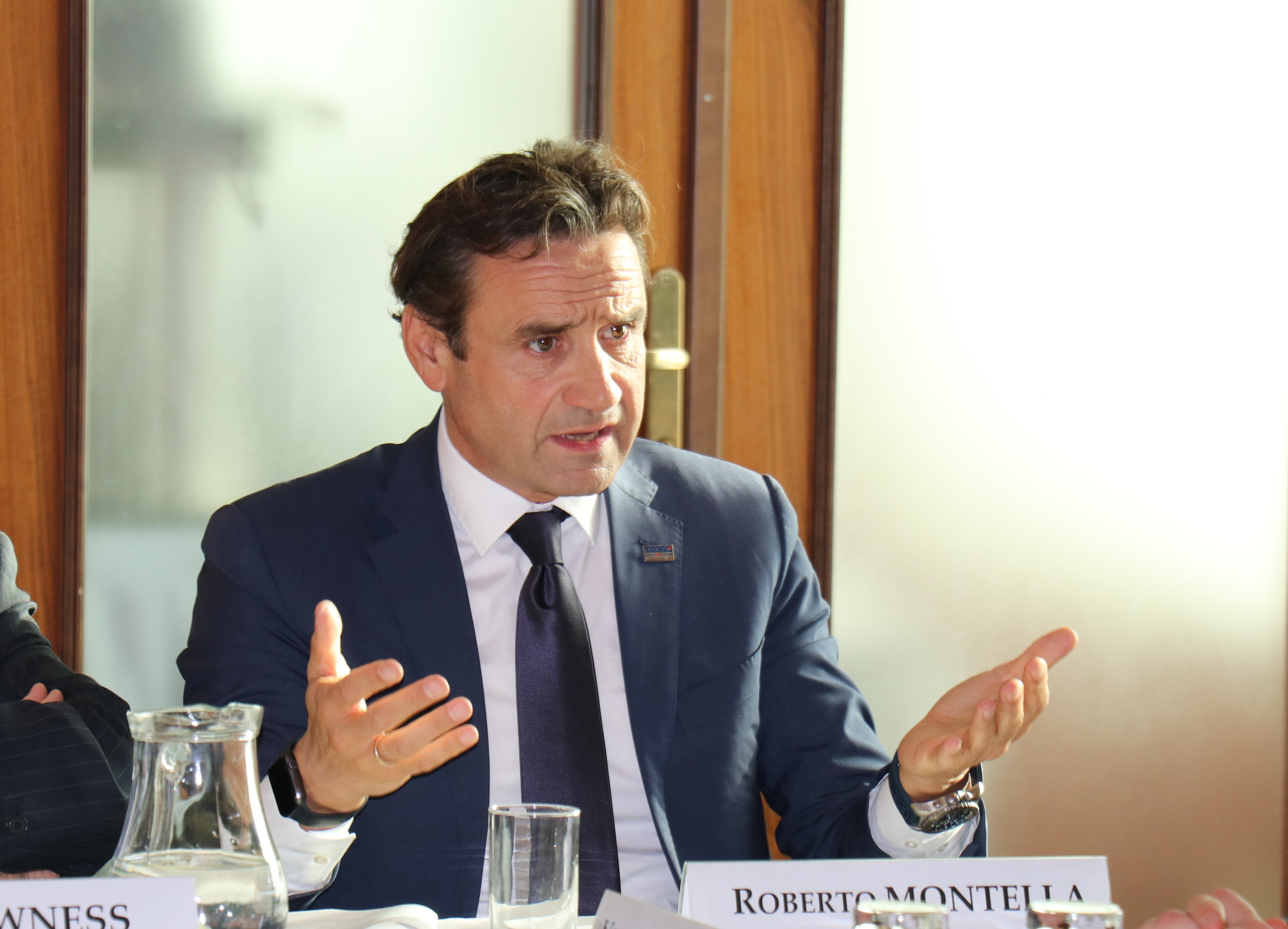
Roberta Montella, Bratislava, December 2019

Roberto Montella (born 1969) serves as the Secretary General of the OSCE Parliamentary Assembly, with his upcoming third term scheduled to begin in 2026 and end 31 December 2030. He started in this position in 2016.

Throughout his career, Montella has worked extensively with OSCE field operations across the Balkans, including missions in Bosnia and Herzegovina, Kosovo, and Serbia and Montenegro. In these roles, he provided advisory services and led peace-building initiatives while taking on various management responsibilities. His leadership positions included serving as Head of the OSCE's South Serbia Regional Office and directing the European Centre for Minority Issues in Kosovo.

As an elections expert, Montella has participated in numerous election observation missions throughout the OSCE region and Middle East. Notable among these was his role as Long Term Election Observers Coordinator for The Carter Center in 2009. His advisory experience includes serving as a political advisor to an Italian senator who was also a Vice-President of PACE. Beyond his diplomatic and advisory work, Montella has accumulated experience in both campaign operations and corporate environments. According to his own biography, Montella holds a Master’s degree in Political Science / International Affairs (1992 - 1996) from the Universita Cattolica Milano, and Bachelor’s degree in Language Interpretation and Translation 1989 - 1992 from the Scuola Superior Interpreti e Traduttori.

In his role, he oversees and coordinates everyday work of the parliamentary assembly of the OSCE and is also in charge of an office in Denmark. Montella has been criticized for facilitating the hiring and promoting of a Russian national who had previously served as Vladimir Putin's interpreter into key roles at the OSCE and for accepting the invitation of Tbilisi's mayor, Kakha Kaladze, to an event organized by the ruling party during his election observation mission.
