= Mary A. Conroy =

American politician

Member of the Maryland Senate from the 24 district
- In office 1982–1983
- Preceded by: Edward T. Conroy
- Succeeded by: Tommie Broadwater

Member of the Maryland House of Delegates from the 23a district
- In office May 1986 – January 10, 2007

Personal details
- Born: December 25, 1931 New York, New York
- Died: August 9, 2014 (aged 82) Annapolis, Maryland
- Party: Democrat
- Spouse: State Senator Edward T. Conroy
- Children: Edward J. Conroy, Sr., Kevin Conroy

Mary Ann Conroy (née O'Connor) was a Democratic State Senator in Maryland representing District 23A, Prince George's County from 1982-1983 and a member of the Maryland House of Delegates, from May 1986 to January 10, 2007. She was born in 1931 in New York City and died in 2014 in Annapolis of hepatitis.

== Committees ==
- 2003-2007 Deputy Majority Leader
- 2003-2007 Economic Matters Committee
- 1986-1993, 1999-2003 Ways and Means Committee
- 1998 Judiciary Committee
- 1994-1997 Commerce and Government Matters Committee
- 1994-2007 Rules and Executive Nominations Committee
- 2004-2007 Joint Committee on Federal Relations
