= R. Spencer Oliver =

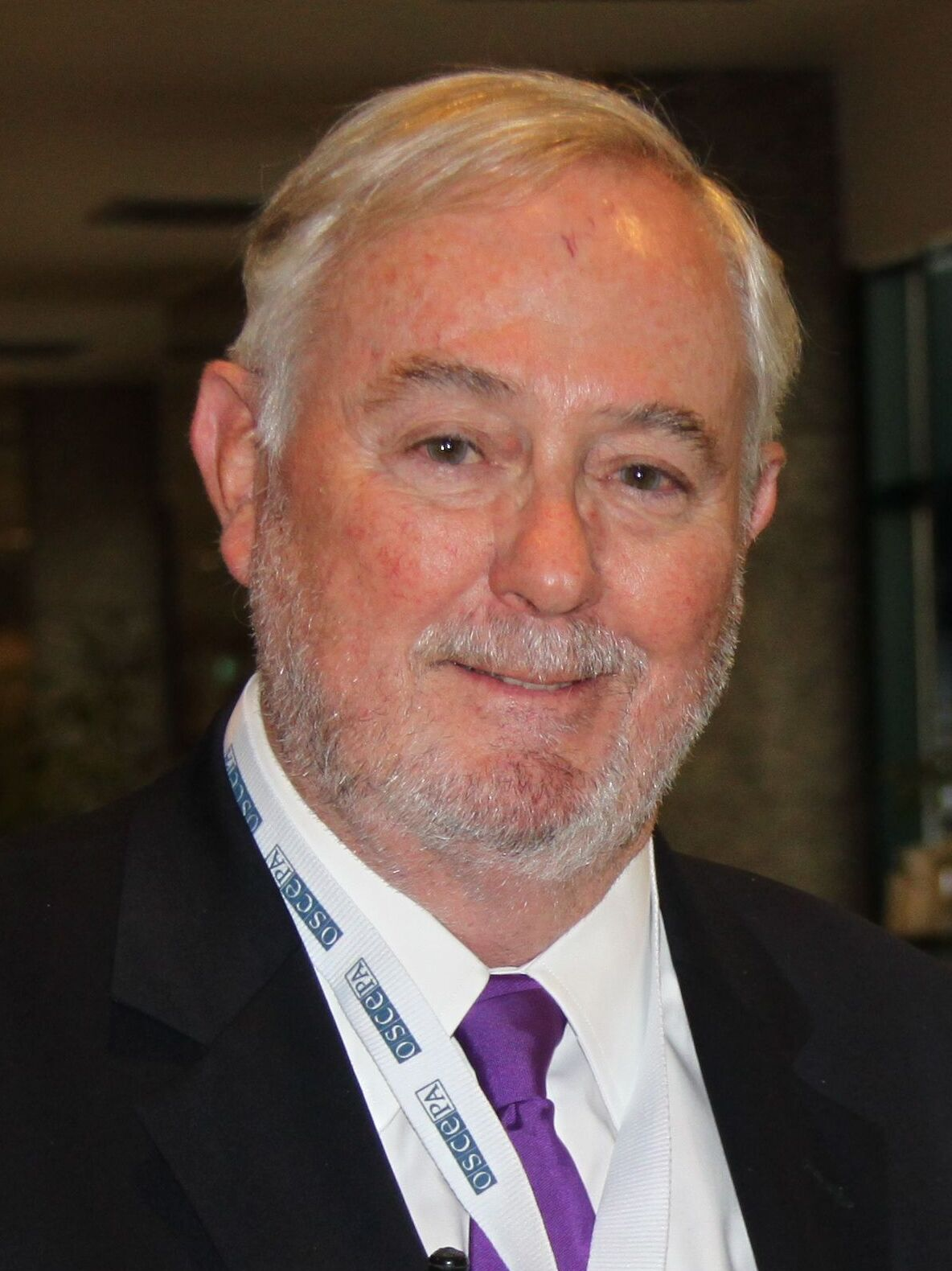
- Oliver in 2013

Secretary General Parliamentary Assembly of the Organization for Security and Co-operation in Europe
- In office 1992–2015
- Succeeded by: Roberto Montella

R. Spencer Oliver (born 1937) was the first Secretary General of the Organization for Security and Co-operation in Europe's Parliamentary Assembly (OSCE PA). A lawyer by training, Oliver previously served 22 years as a staff member in the U.S. Congress, including as Chief of Staff of the U.S. Helsinki Commission from 1976 to 1985 and as Chief Counsel of the Foreign Affairs Committee of the U.S. House of Representatives until January 1993. He also served in several senior diplomatic positions on U.S. delegations to CSCE Review and Expert Meetings between 1977 and 1993. Long active in Democratic Party politics, Oliver's phone was tapped during Operation Gemstone in the Watergate scandal. (Note: The other telephone line that was tapped during Operation Gemstone by The Plumbers also called the Room 16 Project, ODESSA, which worked for the a secret organization named the Special Investigations Unit (SIU), was conducted on June 16, 1972, to replace the malfunctioning "bugs" that had been placed on May 28, 1972, as surveillance devices, was Lawrence O’Brien, who was the chairman of the Democratic Party.)

== Watergate ==
During the first of the two Watergate burglaries, two phones inside the offices of the Democratic National Committee headquarters had wiretaps placed inside them. One of those phones was the phone of Spencer Oliver who at the time was working as the executive director of the Association of State Democratic Chairmen, the other was the phone of the secretary of Democratic National Chairman Larry O'Brien. The tap on Oliver's phone was the only one that worked, but primarily revealed only that Oliver "was quite the ladies' man: he spent a lot of time on the phone lining up cross-country trysts."

== OSCE Parliamentary Assembly ==
R. Spencer Oliver had been the secretary general of the Parliamentary Assembly of the Organization for Security and Co-operation in Europe since its inception, having been chosen as the Assembly's first general secretary by the Bureau in a meeting of the OSCE Parliamentary Assembly in October 1992. He was elected by the standing committee of the organization in January 1993, and was reelected in 1995, 2000, 2005, and 2010. He did not seek reelection in 2015, and retired at the end of that year. The Secretary General's mandate includes responsibility for managing the affairs of the Assembly, ensuring the efficiency of the Secretariat, and carrying out the decisions of the Bureau, the Standing Committee and the Assembly. He reports to the President, the Bureau, the Standing Committee and the Annual Session. Although Oliver was criticized by the former Minister of Defense of Latvia, who ran against him in 2010, Oliver was reelected with more than 95% of the vote.
