= Mykyta Poturaiev =

Ukrainian politician (born 1970)

Mykyta Poturaev
- Микита Потураєв
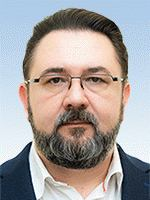

Member of the Verkhovna Rada
- Incumbent
- Assumed office 29 August 2019

Personal details
- Born: Mykyta Ruslanovych Poturayev; 4 September 1970 Dnipropetrovsk, Ukraine, Soviet Union
- Party: Servant of the People

Mykyta Ruslanovych Poturaiev (Ukrainian: Микита Русланович Потураєв; born on 4 September 1970), is a Ukrainian politician, and former political and media consulting commentator who had served as the member of the Verkhovna Rada.

First entering parliament on 29 August 2019, he became the chairman of the Verkhovna Rada Committee on Humanitarian and Information Policy starting 17 June 2020. On 16 July 2026, Poturaiev announced his resignation from parliament due to fundamental disagreements with the ruling coalition. While explicitly stated as not his main reason, the dismissal of Mykhailo Fedorov was mentioned heavily in his resignation letter.

== Biography ==
Mykyta Ruslanovych Poturaiev was born in Dnipro on 4 September 1970.

He is the grandson of the Soviet Ukrainian mechanical scientist, academician of the Academy of Sciences of the Ukrainian SSR, Valentyn Mykytovych, from on his mother's side, and the son of the Ukrainian mechanical scientist Ruslan Palladyovych.

He is a co-founder of the public organization "Quantum Future Lab". He has worked in management positions in the media holding Stalight Media, and was the director of Focus Media. From 2000 to 2001, he was the first deputy chairman of the National Council of Ukraine on Television and Radio Broadcasting.

In the beginning of 2019, was an advisor to President Volodymyr Zelenskyy on political issues.

Poturaiev was a candidate for People's Deputies from the Servant of the People party, elected in 2019, No. 97 on the list. At the time of the elections, he was the director of Focus Media LLC, and independent, and lived in Dnipro.

On 29 August 2019, Poturaiev became the Deputy Chairman of the Committee on Humanitarian and Information Policy, while he was the Chairman of the Subcommittee on Information Policy.

He is the chairman of the Verkhovna Rada Committee on Humanitarian and Information Policy since 17 June 2020.

He was elected Vice-President of the Assembly of OSCE at the 30th Annual Session in Vancouver and was re-elected in The Hague in July 2026.

== Views ==
In 2015, in Surkov's hacked correspondence with the Russian agency, Poturaiev appears as an "entry point" – a person who can be of interest to the Kremlin and promote Russian interests in Ukraine, it is indicated that preliminary conversations were held with him about the problem of a pro-Russian position in Ukraine, and this topic aroused his interest, he is interested in cooperation and is ready to propose ideas and projects.

President Zelenskyy signed the bill into law, banning the Russian Orthodox Church and its affiliations in Ukraine, and according to Poturaiev, the Kremlin was spreading propaganda through the church.
