= John P. T. Mathias =

American politician

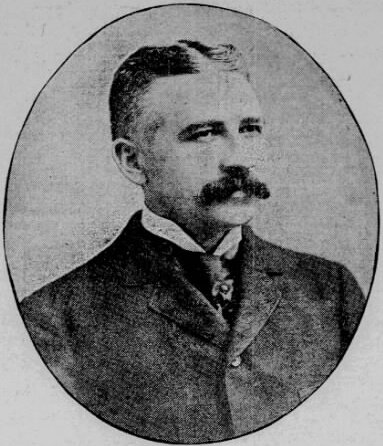
- Mathias in a 1908 newspaper

Member of the Maryland Senate from the Frederick County district
- In office 1908–1916
- Preceded by: David M. Devilbliss
- Succeeded by: George L. Kaufman

Member of the Maryland House of Delegates from the Frederick County district
- In office 1902–1903 Serving with William H. Harry, Thomas Hightman, Augustus W. Nicodemus, James W. Smith
- Preceded by: Simon L. Bast, Samuel R. Brown, D. Princeton Buckey, William H. Lakin, Charles C. Waters
- Succeeded by: Lewis D. Crawford, Eugene L. Harrison, William H. Harry, Philip L. Hiteshew, James W. Smith

Personal details
- Born: John Philip Thomas Mathias; September 7, 1848 near Creagerstown, Frederick County, Maryland, U.S.
- Died: January 20, 1927 (aged 78) Walkersville, Maryland, U.S.
- Party: Republican
- Spouse: Elizabeth Agnes McCurdy (m. 1879)
- Relations: Charles McCurdy Mathias Jr. (grandson)
- Children: 1
- Occupation: Politician; businessman

John Philip Thomas Mathias (September 7, 1848 – January 20, 1927) was an American politician and businessman from Maryland. He served as a member of the Maryland House of Delegates, representing Frederick County, in 1902. He later represented Frederick County in the Maryland Senate from 1908 to 1914.

== Early life ==
John Philip Thomas Mathias was born on September 7, 1848, at a farm near Creagerstown, Frederick County, Maryland, as one of 10 children to Eleanor Carmack (née Stimmel) and Philip Mathias. His grandfather Griffith Mathias was a recruiting officer in the Revolutionary War. He attended public and private schools in Frederick County.

== Career ==
Mathias worked as a clerk at the store of Lewis Wachter at Lewistown and later for O. T. Zimmerman of Lewistown. He then worked as a traveling salesman for Adams, Buck & Company, wholesale hatters of Baltimore. He then formed a partnership with Irvin A. Buck and they started the wholesale hat firm Buck & Mathias in Baltimore. He retired in 1893. He then engaged in real estate and owned farmland in Frederick County, Maryland, and in Jefferson County, West Virginia. In 1898, he was one of the incorporators of the Washington, Frederick, and Gettysburg Railway Company. He was a member of the board of directors of the Citizen Savings Bank in Thurmont (later a branch of the Central Trust Company Inc. of Frederick). He later served as president of the board of directors.

Mathias was a Republican. He served as a member of the Maryland House of Delegates, representing Frederick County, in 1902. He was a member of the education and printing committees. He was vice president of the Maryland delegation to the 1908 Republican National Convention. He served as a member of the Maryland Senate, representing Frederick County, from 1908 to 1916. He was a member of the commission that supervised remodeling of the State House. He was also a member of the commission that built the State Armory in Baltimore.

== Personal life ==
Mathias married Elizabeth Agnes McCurdy, daughter of Amanda (née Wysong) and Charles McCurdy, of Charles Town, West Virginia, on July 2, 1879. They had one son, Charles McCurdy. His grandson was congressman Charles McCurdy Mathias Jr.

Mathias was an elder of St. John's Lutheran Church. He was president of the Frederick County chapter of the Christian Endeavor Society for four years. He was a member of the Acacia Ledge, No. 155, A. F. and A. M. of Thurmont, Jerusalem Council of the Royal Arch Chapter, No. 109 of Baltimore, No. 8 Knights of Templar of Baltimore, and the Knights of Pythias. He was friends with judge John C. Motter. After 1893, Mathias moved back to Frederick County and settled at Thurmont.

Mathias died on January 20, 1927, at the home of his nurse in Walkersville.
