= DeWitt Hyde =

American politician from Maryland

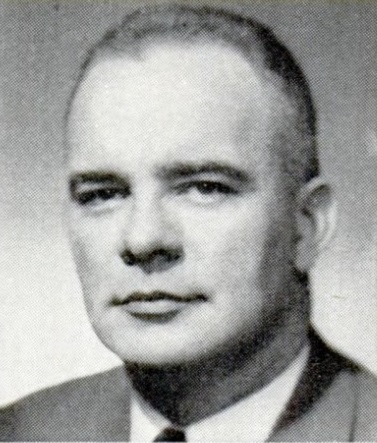

Member of the U.S. House of Representatives from Maryland's 6th district
- In office January 3, 1953 – January 3, 1959
- Preceded by: James Glenn Beall
- Succeeded by: John R. Foley

Member of the Maryland Senate
- In office 1951–1952

Member of the Maryland House of Delegates
- In office 1947–1950

Personal details
- Born: DeWitt Stephen Hyde; March 21, 1909 Washington, District of Columbia, U.S.
- Died: April 25, 1986 (aged 77) Bethesda, Maryland, U.S.
- Resting place: Arlington National Cemetery
- Party: Republican
- Spouse: Mildred Ruth Sullivan
- Education: George Washington University (JD)
- Profession: Attorney

Military service
- Branch/service: United States Navy
- Battles/wars: World War II

DeWitt Stephen Hyde (March 21, 1909 – April 25, 1986) was an American attorney and politician who served as a member of the United States House of Representatives for Maryland's 6th congressional district from 1953 to 1959.

== Early life and education ==
Born in Washington, D.C., Hyde attended the public schools as a youth. He went on to George Washington University, where he received his Juris Doctor in 1935.

== Career ==
Hyde was admitted to the District of Columbia Bar the same year he graduated and commenced the practice of law in Washington, D.C. He worked with the Farm Credit Administration for three years before moving to Maryland in 1938, where he continued law work.

=== Military service ===
In March 1943, during World War II, Hyde entered the United States Navy as a lieutenant, junior grade. He served in the South Pacific, and was separated from the service as a lieutenant commander in May 1946. After the war, he served as an instructor of law at Benjamin Franklin University in Washington, D.C. from 1946 to 1951.

=== Political career ===
Hyde began his political career with service in the Maryland House of Delegates from 1947 to 1950. He was later a member of the Maryland Senate in 1951 and 1952. In 1952, Hyde was elected as a Republican to the Eighty-third, Eighty-fourth, and Eighty-fifth Congresses, where he served from January 3, 1953, to January 3, 1959.

Hyde did not sign the 1956 Southern Manifesto and voted in favor of the Civil Rights Act of 1957. He was an unsuccessful candidate for reelection in 1958 to the Eighty-sixth Congress, and returned to the practice of law. In 1959, he was appointed as an associate judge of the District of Columbia Court of General Sessions, which became the Superior Court of the District of Columbia in 1971. Hyde served until 1979, when he retired.

== Personal life ==
He was a resident of Bethesda, Maryland, where he died in 1986. he was buried at Arlington National Cemetery.

U.S. House of Representatives
Preceded by James Glenn Beall	Member of the U.S. House of Representatives from Maryland's 6th congressional district 1953–1959	Succeeded by John R. Foley
