= Edward T. Conroy =

American politician

Member of the Maryland Senate from the 24 district
- In office 1966–1982
- Succeeded by: Mary A. Conroy

Personal details
- Born: January 31, 1929 New York City
- Died: May 24, 1982 (aged 53) Walter Reed Army Medical Center, Washington D.C.
- Party: Democratic
- Spouse: State Senator Mary A. Conroy
- Children: Edward J. Conroy, Sr., Kevin Conroy

Edward T. Conroy (January 31, 1929 – May 24, 1982) was an attorney, United States Army officer, and state senator in Maryland. A veteran of the Korean War, he lost his left hand and suffered severe burns during combat which ended his intended career as a physician. He was the recipient of the Silver Star and the Purple Heart. While in office as a politician, he supported labor unions and was an advocate for the rights of people with disabilities; including but not limited to support of the Disabled American Veterans organization.

== Life and career ==
Conroy was born in New York City and educated at Xavier High School where he received military-training. He studied medicine at Fordham University and served as a first lieutenant in the United States Army during the Korean War. He was seriously wounded at the Battle of Heartbreak Ridge; losing his left hand in addition to suffering severe burns of his skin. He was awarded the Silver Star and two Purple Hearts.

The loss of his hand ended his career prospects in medicine, and Conroy reoriented his career toward the law; earning a degree from Georgetown University Law Center. In 1962 he was elected to the Maryland House of Delegates; serving one term. He was first elected to the Maryland Senate in 1966 which remained his political home until his death from cancer in 1982. In 1980, he was the Democratic Party candidate for U.S. Senate.

He served as National Commander of the Disabled American Veterans from 1971 to 1972.

== Legacy ==
The Edward T. Conroy Memorial Scholarship Program was created in his memory.

Party political offices
Preceded by Barbara Mikulski	Democratic nominee for U.S. Senator from Maryland (Class 3); 1980	Succeeded by Barbara Mikulski
