= List of colleges and universities in Washington =

List of colleges and universities in Washington may refer to:

- List of colleges and universities in Washington (state)
- List of colleges and universities in Washington, D.C.
