= Gladys Spellman =

American politician (1918–1988)

Gladys Noon Spellman
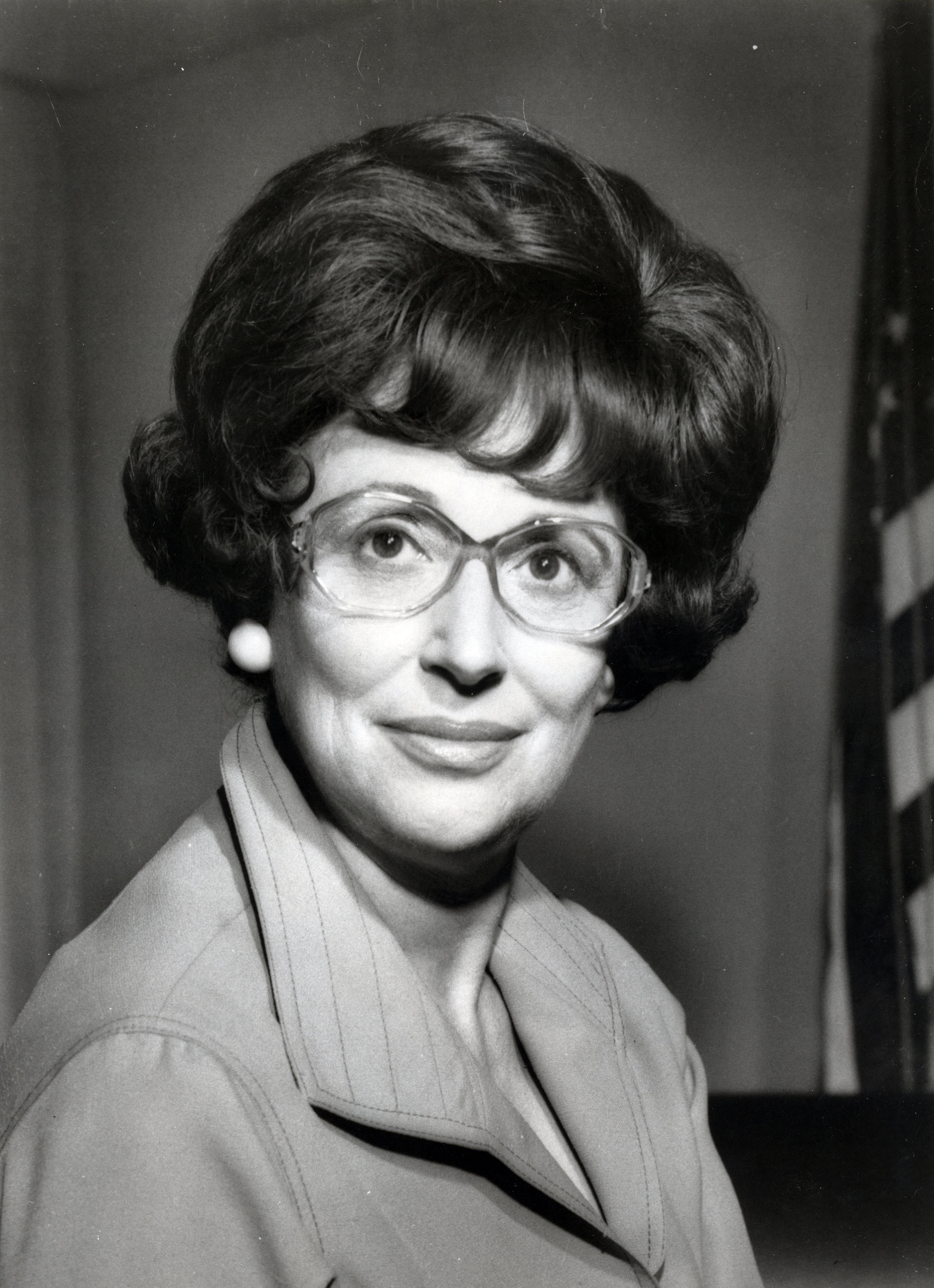

Member of the U.S. House of Representatives from Maryland's 5th district
- In office January 3, 1975 – February 24, 1981
- Preceded by: Lawrence Hogan
- Succeeded by: Steny Hoyer

Personal details
- Born: Gladys Blossom Noon; March 2, 1918 New York City, U.S.
- Died: June 19, 1988 (aged 70) Rockville, Maryland, U.S.
- Resting place: Arlington National Cemetery
- Party: Democratic
- Spouse: Reuben Spellman
- Children: 3
- Education: George Washington University; Graduate School USA

Gladys Noon Spellman (born Gladys Blossom Noon; March 2, 1918 – June 19, 1988) was an American educator who served as the U.S. representative for Maryland's 5th congressional district from January 3, 1975, to February 24, 1981, when her seat was declared vacant after she fell into a coma the previous year. She was a member of the Democratic Party.

== Early life ==
Spellman was born Gladys Blossom Noon in New York City and attended Eastern High School and Roosevelt High School in Washington, D.C. She graduated from George Washington University and the graduate school within the United States Department of Agriculture.

Spellman began her career as an elementary school teacher, teaching in Prince George's County, Maryland, schools. A consummate politician, Spellman was part of the wave of young, new suburban dwellers who moved to Prince George's County from Washington and elsewhere in the years after World War II, and that group remained her constituency throughout her political career.

== Teacher and county politician ==
During the 1950s and 1960s, Spellman was a teacher and president of the PTA for Happy Acres Elementary School (renamed the Gladys Noon Spellman Elementary School in 1991), a civic association activist as a young mother and housewife in Cheverly as well as chairwoman of the National Mental Health Study Center. Her activities led to leadership positions in the reform movement that seized control of the Prince George's County government during the 1960s, ousting the old guard Democratic organization that had managed affairs in Prince George's for decades.

Spellman was active in the fight for a home rule charter form of government for Prince George's. In 1962, running on a reform slate, she served as a member of the Prince George's County Board of Commissioners from 1962 to 1970. She served two years as chairman, effectively the head of the county's government. After the establishment of the County Council, Spellman served as councilwoman at large from 1971 to 1974. She was appointed by President Lyndon B. Johnson to the Advisory Commission on Intergovernmental Relations in 1967 and was awarded the highest honor that could be bestowed by county officials nationwide when she became the first woman elected president of the National Association of Counties in 1972.

== Congress ==
Spellman easily won the Democratic primary nomination in September 1974 for Maryland's fifth congressional seat, and went on to defeat the Republican, John B. Burcham, Jr., in the general election. While in Congress, she served on the Committee on Banking, Currency and Housing, the Democratic Steering and Policy Committee, and the Committee on Post Office and Civil Service (including serving as chairperson of the Subcommittee on Compensation and Employee Benefits). Almost 40 percent of the work force in her district was employed by the federal government – the highest percentage of any congressional district in the nation.

In 1977, Spellman favored legislation to establish a bank to make loans to cooperatives owned by consumers as well as legislation to extend the federal revenue-sharing program. She also voted for the 1975 proposal authorizing $7 billion to loan guarantees for the financially troubled New York City. Spellman also resisted placing restrictions on hiring or promotion of federal employees and opposed Jimmy Carter's plan to reform the civil service system in 1978.

== Honors ==
In 1979, the Supersisters trading card set was produced and distributed; one of the cards featured Spellman's name and picture. In 1985, Spellman was an inductee to the Maryland Women's Hall of Fame, part of its inaugural class.

The Baltimore–Washington Parkway, a scenic north–south highway in Maryland, is dedicated to Spellman, as is Gladys Noon Spellman Elementary School, located in Cheverly, Maryland.

== Personal life ==
Spellman lived in Laurel, Maryland, with husband Reuben Spellman, with whom she had three children: Stephen, Richard, and Dana Spellman O’Neill. She was Jewish.

=== Coma and aftermath ===
On October 31, 1980, Spellman was judging a Halloween costume contest at the Laurel Mall when she had an incapacitating heart attack. Her heart briefly stopped beating. Five days later, on November 4, she was re-elected to Congress with 80% of the vote against a little-known Republican opponent, but it soon became clear that she would be comatose for the rest of her life.

In the first weeks of the 97th Congress, the House passed a resolution providing for Spellman's pay as if she had been seated, and for her Congressional office to be supported as if a member of Congress had died or resigned. When it became clear she was permanently incapacitated and unlikely to recover, the House passed an act declaring the 5th District seat vacant. As a result, Spellman's pay and administrative support was scheduled to be terminated upon the election of someone to her seat. It is the only time that medical reasons have resulted in the House of Representatives declaring a seat vacant. Thirty-two candidates from both parties entered the race, including her husband, Reuben. He was defeated for the Democratic nomination by Steny Hoyer, who won the special election on May 19 against the Republican nominee, Bowie mayor Audrey Scott. Hoyer would serve as House Majority Leader, and continued to be re-elected until 2026 when he announced he would not seek another term.

Spellman never regained consciousness and died in a Maryland nursing home on June 19, 1988, after nearly eight years in a coma. She and her husband are buried at Arlington National Cemetery.

== See also ==
- List of Jewish members of the United States Congress
- List of United States representatives from Maryland
- Women in the United States House of Representatives

U.S. House of Representatives
Preceded by Lawrence Hogan	Member of the U.S. House of Representatives from Maryland's 5th congressional district January 3, 1975 – February 24, 1981	Succeeded by Steny Hoyer
