= List of colleges and universities in Washington, D.C. =

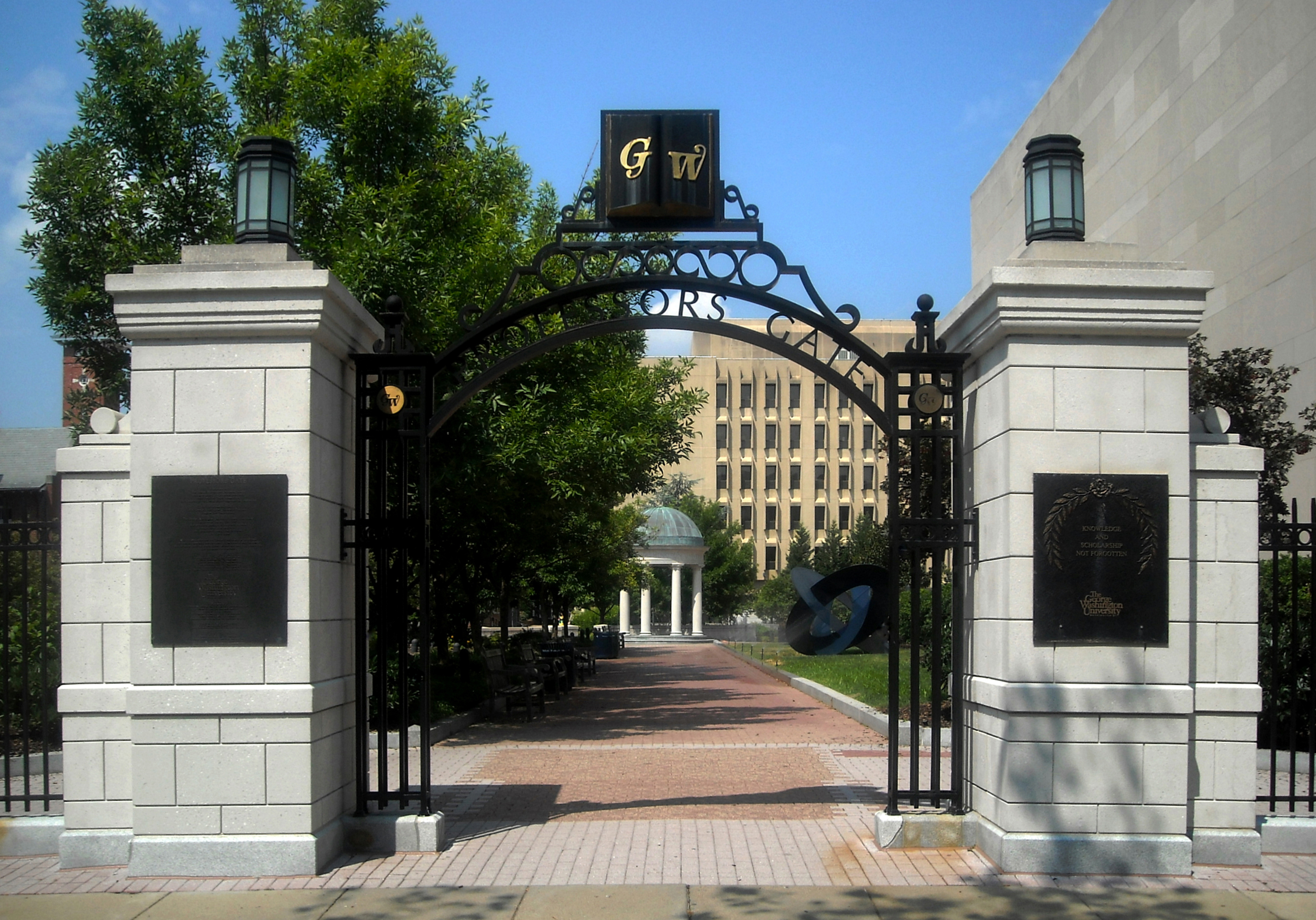
Midcampus of George Washington University

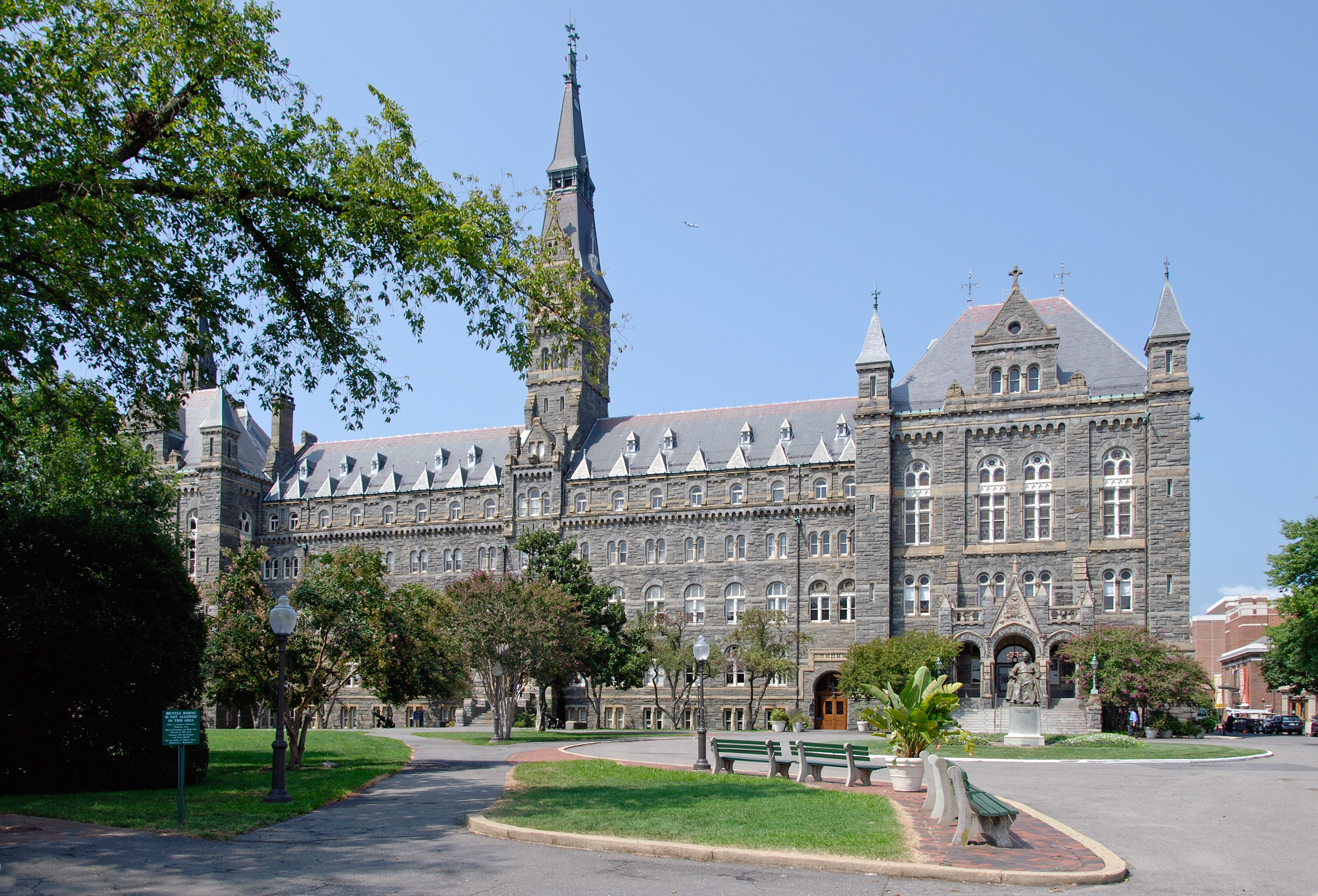
Healy Hall at Georgetown University

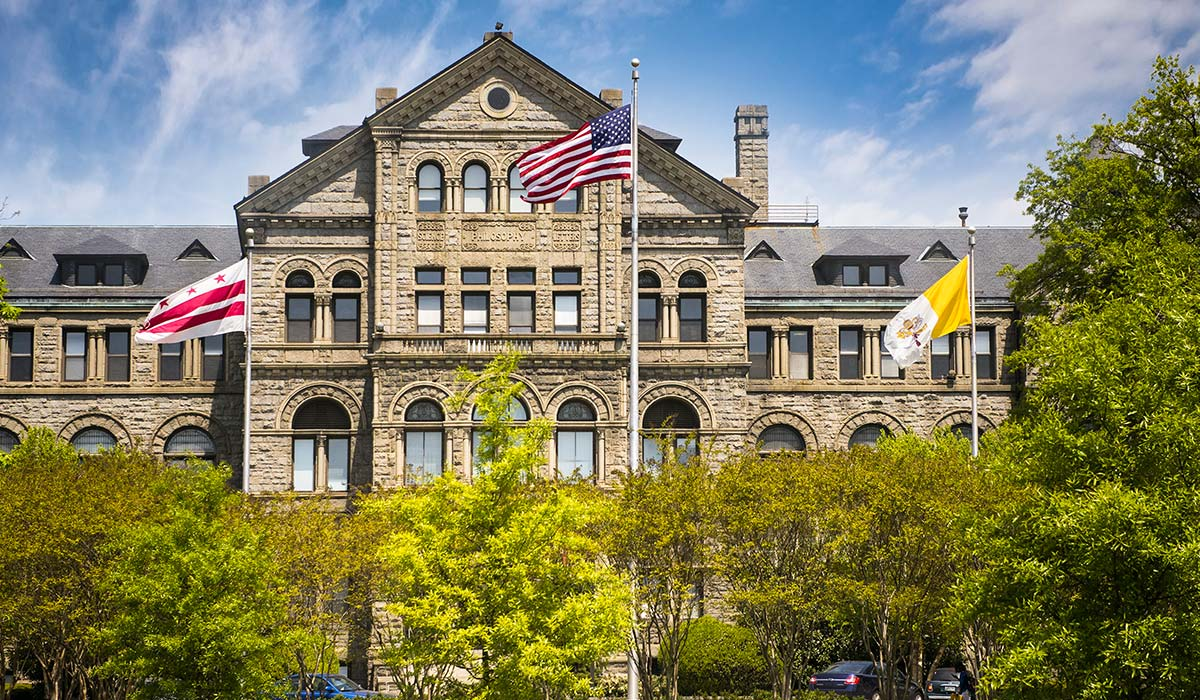
McMahon Hall at the Catholic University of America

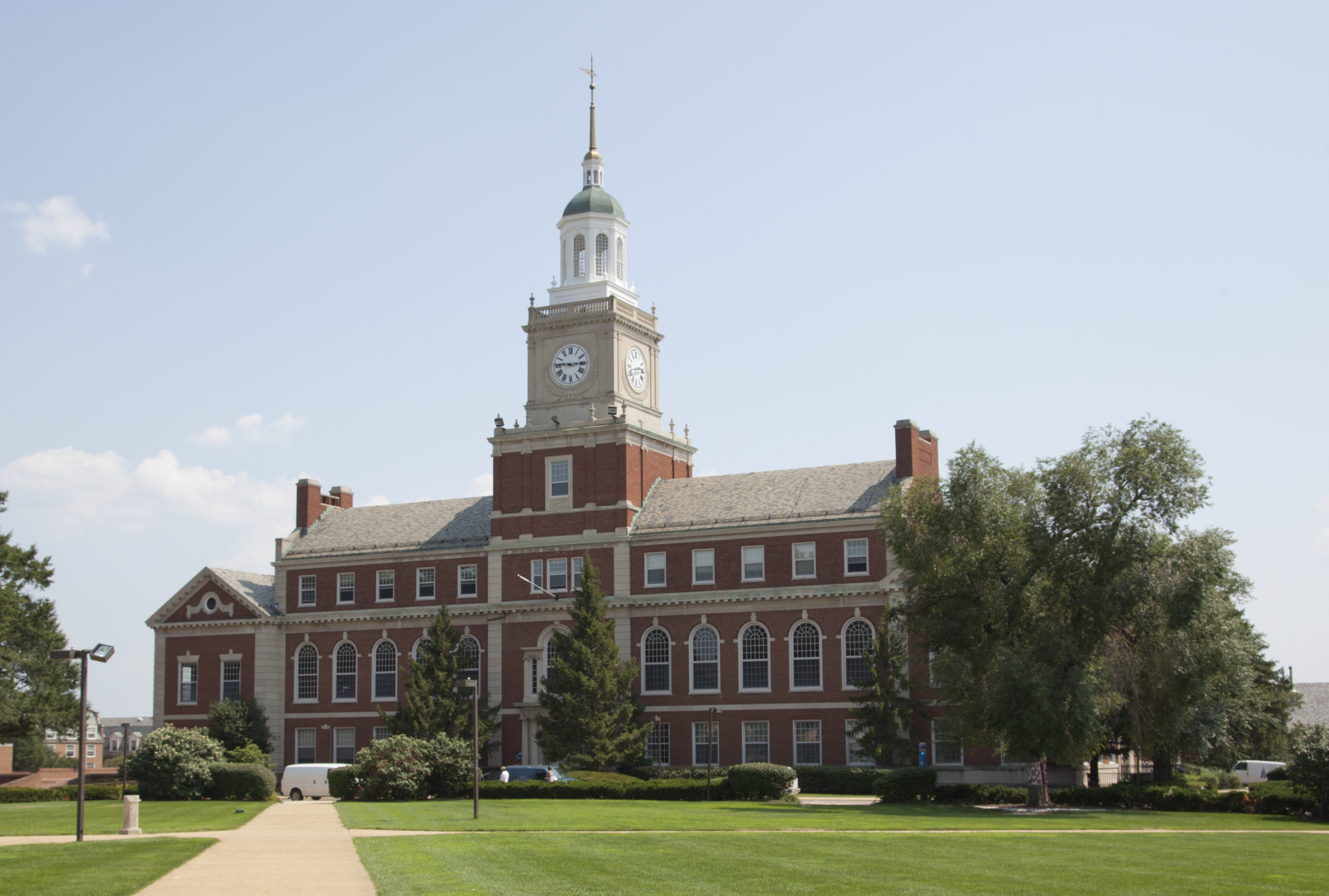
Founders Library at Howard University

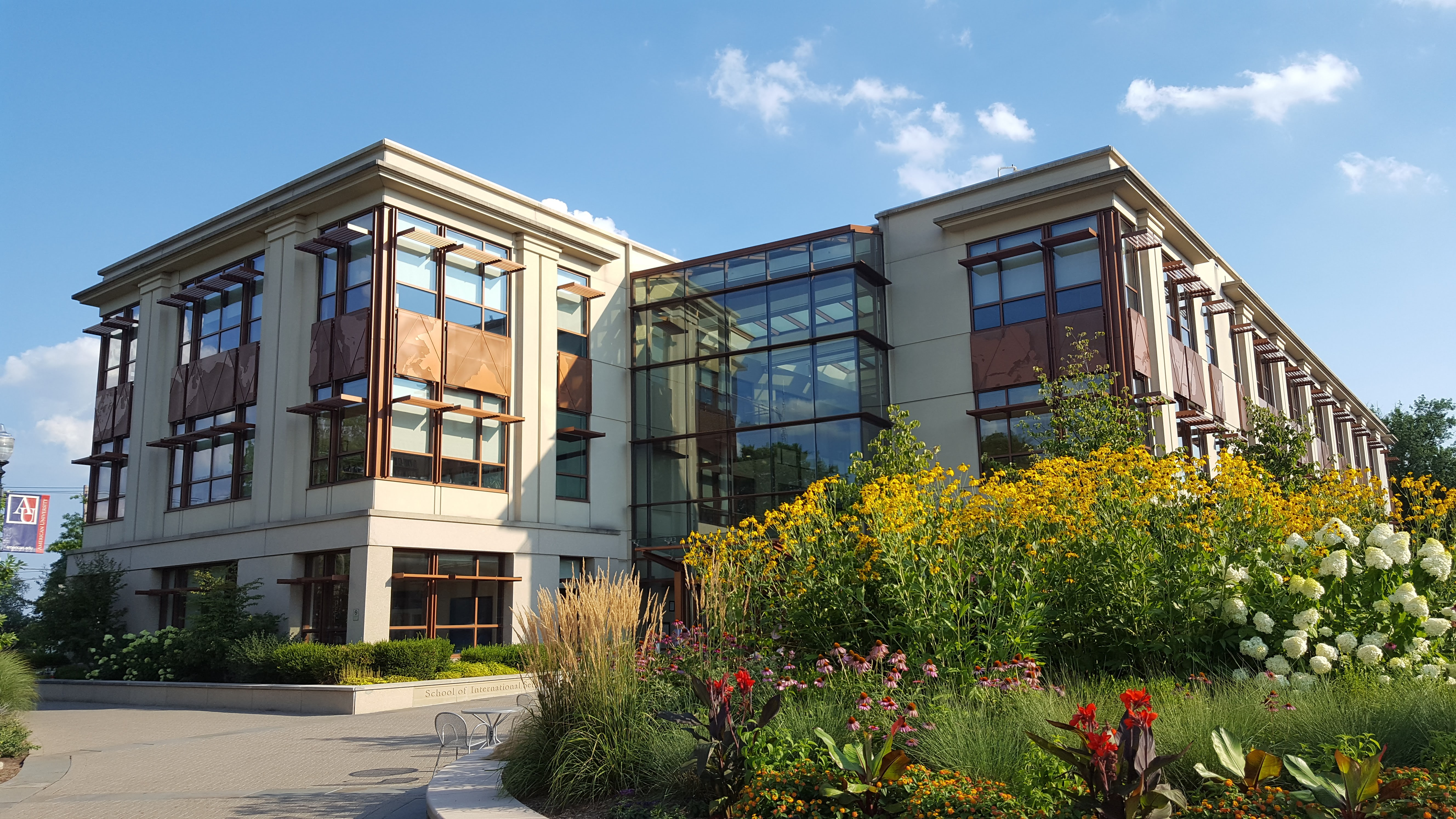
School of International Service at American University

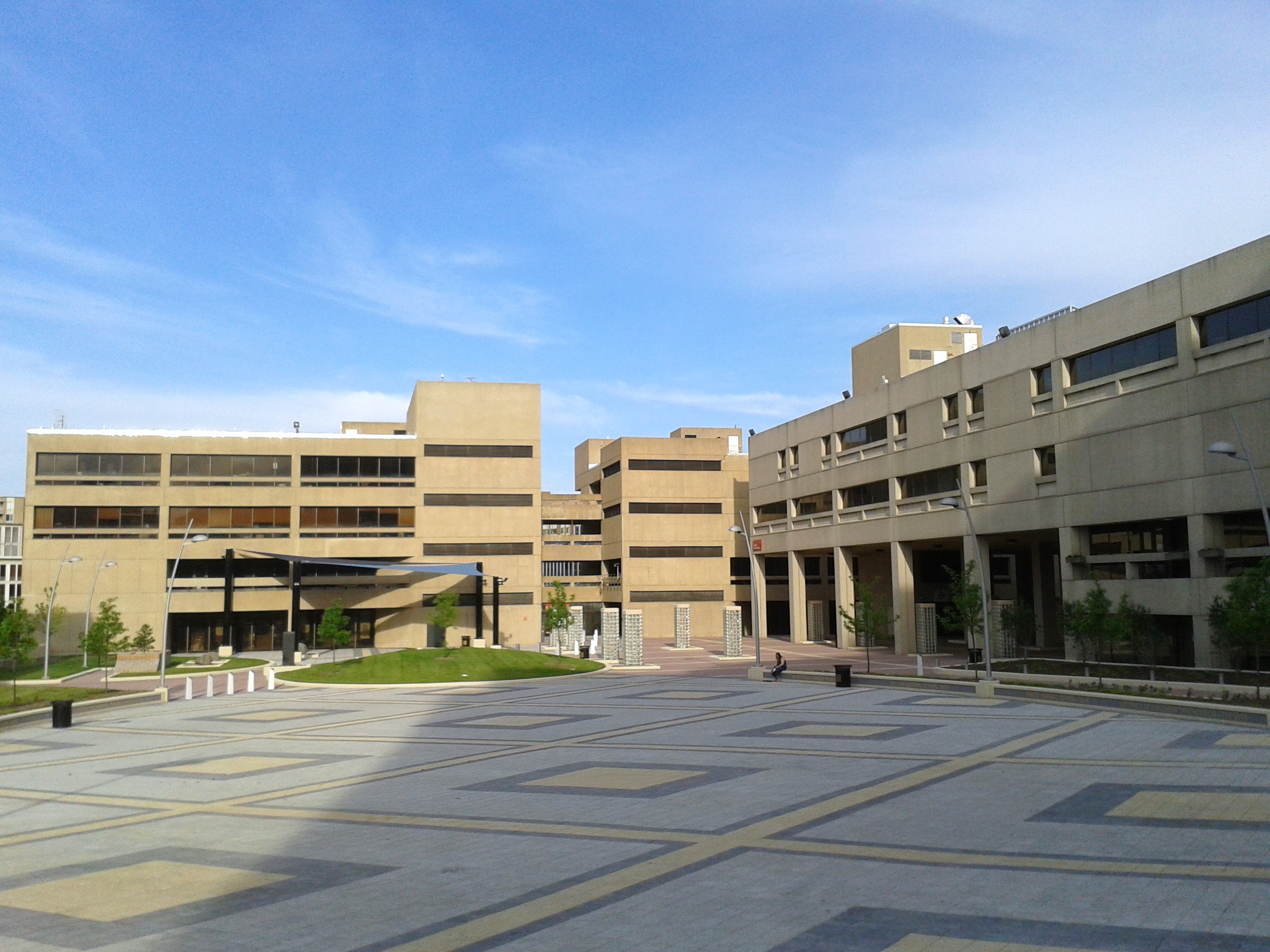
Founders' Plaza at the University of the District of Columbia

There are nineteen colleges and universities in Washington, D.C., that are listed under the Carnegie Classification of Institutions of Higher Education. (Note: National Defense University, the Paul H. Nitze School of Advanced International Studies, and St. Paul's College are not listed under the Carnegie Classification of Institutions of Higher Education or by the United States Department of Education Institute of Education Sciences.) These institutions include five research universities, four master's universities, and ten special-focus institutions. Sixteen of Washington, D.C.'s post-secondary institutions are private, of which three are for-profit. Only three of the city's post-secondary institutions listed under the Carnegie Classification of Institutions of Higher Education are public. In addition to the institutions listed under the Carnegie Classification of Institutions of Higher Education, Washington, D.C., has four additional private not-for-profit post-secondary institutions (Bay Atlantic University, Johns Hopkins University's Paul H. Nitze School of Advanced International Studies, NewU University, and St. Paul's College) and two additional public post-secondary institutions (National Defense University and the Inter-American Defense College).

Washington, D.C.'s oldest post-secondary institution is Georgetown University, founded in 1789. Georgetown University is also the oldest Jesuit and Catholic university in the United States. Founded in 1821, George Washington University is the city's largest institution of higher learning in terms of enrollment, as it had 25,653 students as of the spring of 2013. George Washington left shares to endow a university in D.C. which became George Washington University According to the United States Department of Education Institute of Education Sciences, Washington Theological Union is the city's smallest with an enrollment of 80.

In total, there are six Catholic post-secondary institutions listed under the Carnegie Classification of Institutions of Higher Education in Washington, D.C.: Catholic University of America, Georgetown University, the Dominican House of Studies, the Pontifical John Paul II Institute for Studies on Marriage and Family at The Catholic University of America, Trinity Washington University, and the Washington Theological Union.

In addition, Gallaudet University is a post-secondary institution for the deaf and hard of hearing, and its curriculum is officially bilingual in both English and American Sign Language.

The University of the District of Columbia is Washington, D.C.'s largest public university (with an enrollment of 5,110 students) and its oldest historically black university. It is also DC's sole land-grant university. The other HBCU in the district, a member of the Thurgood Marshall College Fund alongside UDC, is Howard University, one of the top-ranked HBCUs in the nation.

Washington, D.C., has three medical schools: George Washington University School of Medicine & Health Sciences, Georgetown University School of Medicine, and Howard University College of Medicine. There are six law schools that are accredited by the American Bar Association (ABA): the University of the District of Columbia David A. Clarke School of Law, Columbus School of Law (Catholic University of America), Howard University School of Law, George Washington University Law School, Georgetown University Law Center, and Washington College of Law (American University). Four international relations schools in Washington, D.C., are members of the Association of Professional Schools of International Affairs (APSIA): Georgetown University's Edmund A. Walsh School of Foreign Service, Johns Hopkins University's Paul H. Nitze School of Advanced International Studies, George Washington University's Elliott School of International Affairs, and American University's School of International Service.

Eighteen of Washington, D.C.'s post-secondary institutions are officially recognized by the Middle States Association of Colleges and Schools (MSA). Most are accredited by multiple agencies, such as the American Psychological Association (APA), the American Speech–Language–Hearing Association (ASHA), the Association of Theological Schools in the United States and Canada (ATS), the Commission on Collegiate Nursing Education (CCNE), and the National Council for Accreditation of Teacher Education (NCATE).

== Institutions ==
List of active institutions
School	Control (Note: School control and type is based on the Carnegie Classification of Institutions of Higher Education.)	Type (Note: School control and type is based on the Carnegie Classification of Institutions of Higher Education.)	Enrollment (Fall 2024)	Founded	Accreditation
American University	Private not-for-profit	Doctoral/research university	12,321	1893	ABA, APA, CEPH, MSCHE
Bay Atlantic University	Private not-for-profit	Not Classified		2014	NECHE
Catholic University of America	Private not-for-profit	Research university	5,243	1887	ACEN, ABA, APA, ATS, CCNE, MSCHE, NASM
Gallaudet University	Private not-for-profit	Doctoral university	1,335	1864	APA, ASHA, CEA, MSCHE
George Washington University	Private not-for-profit	Research university	25,374	1821	ACME, ABA, APTA, APA, ASHA, CCNE, CEPH, CPE, LCME, MSCHE, NASAD
Georgetown University	Private not-for-profit	Research university	20,031	1789	ACME, ABA, CCNE, CEA, COA, CPE, LCME, MSCHE
Howard University	Private not-for-profit	Research university	14,890	1867	ACPE, ABA, ADA, AND, AOTA, APTA, APA, ASHA, ATS, CCNE, JRCERT, LCME, MSCHE, NASAD, NASM, NAST
Institute of World Politics	Private not-for-profit	Special-focus institution	173	1990	MSCHE
NewU University	Private not-for-profit	Special-focus institution	34	2019	MSCHE
Pontifical Faculty of the Immaculate Conception at the Dominican House of Studies	Private not-for-profit	Special-focus institution	74	1902	ATS, MSCHE
Pontifical John Paul II Institute for Studies on Marriage and Family (Note: The Pontifical John Paul II Institute for Studies on Marriage and Family at The Catholic University of America, while affiliated with Catholic University of America, is not a division of the university.)	Private not-for-profit	Special-focus institution	65	1988	MSCHE
Strayer University–District of Columbia	Private for-profit	Master's university	12,286	1904	CCNE, MSCHE
Trinity Washington University	Private not-for-profit	Master's university	1,948	1897	AOTA, CCNE, MSCHE
University of the District of Columbia	Public	Master's university	4,202	1851	ACEN, ABFSE, AND, ASHA, JRCERT, MSCHE
University of the Potomac–Washington DC Campus	Private for-profit	Special-focus institution	1,241	1989	MSCHE
Wesley Theological Seminary	Private not-for-profit	Special-focus institution	374	1882	ATS, MSCHE

=== Other active institutions ===
List of other active institutions (Note: These institutions are not listed under the Carnegie Classification of Institutions of Higher Education or by the United States Department of Education Institute of Education Sciences.)
School	Control	Founded	Accreditation
Quantic School of Business and Technology	Private for-profit	2014	DEAC
Human Resources University	Public (U.S. Government)	2011	N/A
Inter-American Defense College	Public (Organization of American States and the Inter-American Defense Board)	1962	MSCHE
National Defense University	Public (U.S. Government & Armed Forces)	1976	MSA
National Intelligence University (Note: National Intelligence University is not listed by the United States Department of Education Institute of Education Sciences.)	Public (U.S. Government and U.S. Armed Forces)	1962	MSCHE
Johns Hopkins University Carey Business School	Private not-for-profit	2007	AACSB
Johns Hopkins University Paul H. Nitze School of Advanced International Studies	Private not-for-profit	1943	N/A (Note: The Paul H. Nitze School of Advanced International Studies is not independently accredited, as it is a division of Johns Hopkins University.)
St. Paul's College	Private not-for-profit	1914	None

=== Active institutions with satellite programs ===
List of active institutions with satellite programs
School
Arizona State University
Brown University
The College of William & Mary
Cornell University
Hillsdale College
Johns Hopkins University
New York University
Pepperdine University
Marquette University
Stanford University
Texas A&M University
University of California, Washington Center
University of Maryland
University of Texas at Austin

== Defunct institutions ==
List of defunct institutions in Washington, D.C.
School	Control	Founded	Closed	Notes
Benjamin Franklin University	Private not-for-profit	1925	1987	Merged with George Washington University in 1987
Corcoran College of the Arts and Design	Private not-for-profit	1878	2014	Absorbed into George Washington University
Dunbarton College of the Holy Cross	Private not-for-profit	1935	1973	Campus acquired by Howard University in 1974 to serve as the campus for Howard University School of Law
Graduate School USA	Private not-for-profit	1921	Still open	No longer offering academic degree programs or for-credit courses
Mount Vernon Seminary and College	Private not-for-profit	1875	1999	Merged with George Washington University in 1999, and currently serves as the institution's Mount Vernon Campus
Southeastern University	Private not-for-profit	1879	2009	Acquired by Graduate School USA in 2010

== See also ==
- Higher education in the United States
- List of college athletic programs in Washington, D.C.
- List of recognized higher education accreditation organizations
- Lists of American institutions of higher education

== Bibliography ==
- Fogle, Jeanne (2009). A Neighborhood Guide to Washington, D.C.'s Hidden History. Charleston, South Carolina: The History Press. ISBN 9781596296527. OCLC 314841198 – via Google Books.
- McGregor, James Harvey (2007). Washington from the Ground Up. Cambridge, Massachusetts: Harvard University Press. ISBN 9780674026049. OCLC 80358360 – via Internet Archive.
- O'Neill, Paul R.; Williams, Paul K. (2003). Georgetown University. Charleston, South Carolina: Arcadia Publishing. ISBN 9780738515090. OCLC 52615222 – via Google Books.
