= 1982 United States Senate election in Maryland =

- November 2, 1982
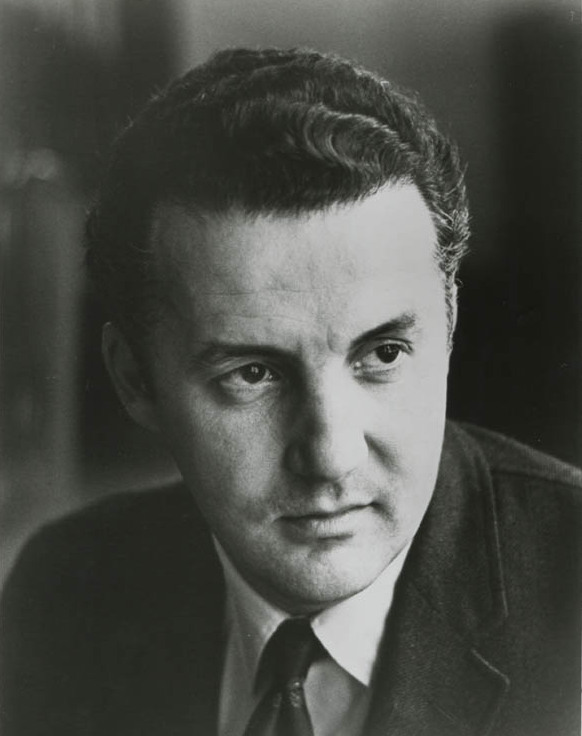

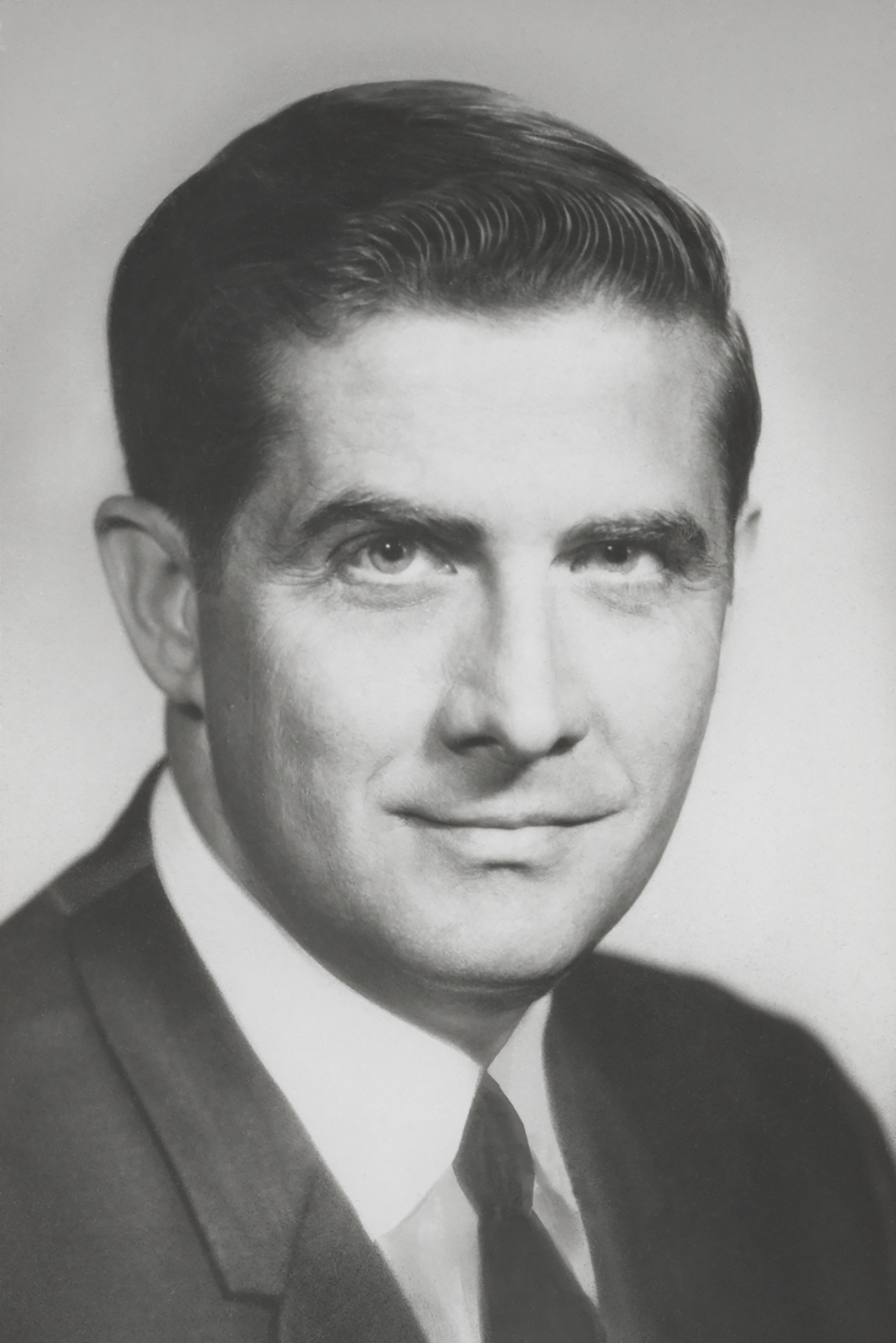
Nominee	Paul Sarbanes	Lawrence Hogan
Party	Democratic	Republican
Popular vote	707,356	407,334
Percentage	63.46%	36.54%
- County results Sarbanes: 50–60% 60–70% 80–90% Hogan: 50–60%
U.S. senator before election
Paul Sarbanes
Democratic
Elected U.S. Senator
Paul Sarbanes
Democratic

The 1982 United States Senate election in Maryland took place on November 2, 1982, simultaneously with other elections for seats in the U.S. Senate and House of Representatives in addition to gubernatorial openings. Incumbent Democratic Senator Paul Sarbanes won reelection to a second term in office. He defeated the Republican nominee, former Representative from Maryland's 5th district and Prince George's County Executive Lawrence Hogan.

Sarbanes carried Garrett County, the state's westernmost county and one which is so strongly Republican that it has never voted for a Democratic presidential candidate as of 2026. Sarbanes would repeat this feat six years later in 1988, but no Democrat has won Garrett County in a Senate election since then.

Forty-two years later, Hogan's son Larry Hogan became the Republican nominee for the same seat.

== Major candidates ==
=== Democratic ===
- Paul Sarbanes, incumbent U.S. Senator since 1977.

=== Republican ===
- Lawrence Hogan, former U.S. Representative from Maryland's 5th congressional district from 1969 to 1975.

== Results ==
General election results
Party	Candidate	Votes	%
Democratic	Paul Sarbanes (incumbent)	707,356	63.46%
Republican	Lawrence Hogan	407,334	36.54%
Turnout		1,114,690	
Democratic hold			

=== Results by county ===
County	Paul S. Sarbanes Democratic		Lawrence Hogan Republican		Margin		Total Votes Cast
County	#	%	#	%	#	%	Total Votes Cast
Allegany	12056	53.44%	10503	46.56%	1553	6.88%	22559
Anne Arundel	52875	54.47%	44199	45.53%	8676	8.94%	97074
Baltimore (City)	160318	82.98%	32881	17.02%	127437	65.96%	193199
Baltimore (County)	118305	59.41%	80834	40.59%	37471	18.82%	199139
Calvert	5768	61.48%	3614	38.52%	2154	22.96%	9382
Caroline	3046	57.66%	2237	42.34%	809	15.31%	5283
Carroll	10752	43.71%	13844	56.29%	-3092	-12.57%	24596
Cecil	8275	58.00%	5992	42.00%	2283	16.00%	14267
Charles	9266	57.40%	6878	42.60%	2388	14.79%	16144
Dorchester	4540	59.15%	3136	40.85%	1404	18.29%	7676
Frederick	13115	47.96%	14230	52.04%	-1115	-4.08%	27345
Garrett	3801	55.34%	3067	44.66%	734	10.69%	6868
Harford	20024	52.42%	18175	47.58%	1849	4.84%	38199
Howard	20819	59.24%	14322	40.76%	6497	18.49%	35141
Kent	3153	59.69%	2129	40.31%	1024	19.39%	5282
Montgomery	121589	63.86%	68818	36.14%	52771	27.71%	190407
Prince George's	94619	69.17%	42172	30.83%	52447	38.34%	136791
Queen Anne's	3957	54.56%	3296	45.44%	661	9.11%	7253
St. Mary's	7265	61.63%	4524	38.37%	2741	23.25%	11789
Somerset	3218	56.26%	2502	43.74%	716	12.52%	5720
Talbot	4124	50.06%	4114	49.94%	10	0.12%	8238
Washington	13126	47.18%	14696	52.82%	-1570	-5.64%	27822
Wicomico	9240	55.15%	7515	44.85%	1725	10.30%	16755
Worcester	4105	52.89%	3656	47.11%	449	5.79%	7761
Total	707356	63.46%	407334	36.54%	300022	26.92%	1114690

==== Counties that flipped from Republican to Democratic ====
- Allegany
- Caroline
- Garrett
- Talbot
- Worcester

== See also ==
- 1982 United States Senate elections
- 1982 United States elections
