= 1994 United States Senate election in Maryland =

- November 8, 1994
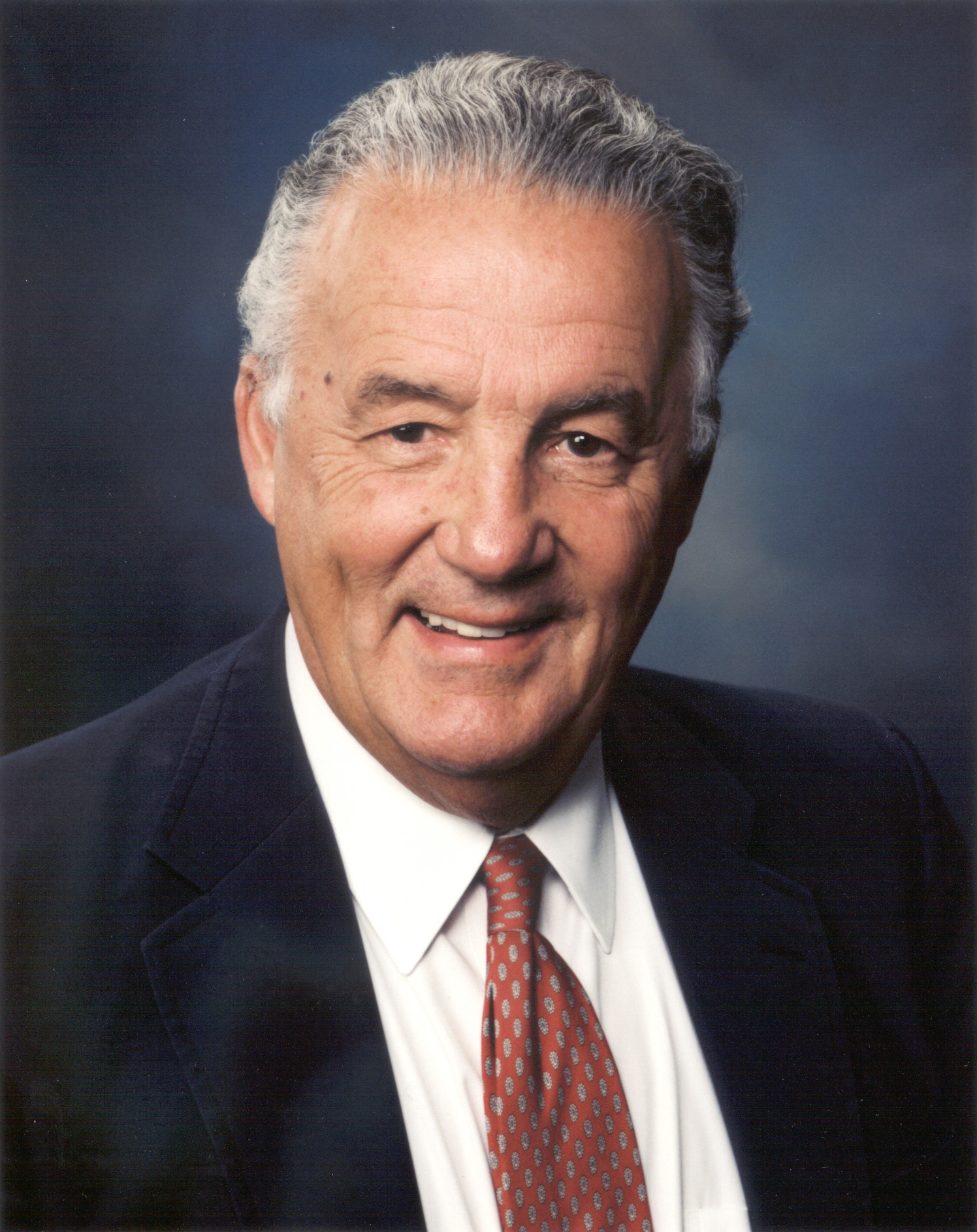

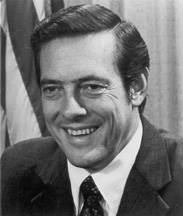
Nominee	Paul Sarbanes	Bill Brock
Party	Democratic	Republican
Popular vote	809,125	559,908
Percentage	59.10%	40.90%
- County results Sarbanes: 50–60% 60–70% 70–80% 80–90% Brock: 50–60%
U.S. senator before election
Paul Sarbanes
Democratic
Elected U.S. Senator
Paul Sarbanes
Democratic

The 1994 United States Senate Election in Maryland was held November 8, 1994. Incumbent Democratic Senator Paul Sarbanes won re-election to a fourth term.

== Campaign ==
=== Major candidates ===
==== Democratic ====
- Paul Sarbanes, incumbent U.S. Senator

==== Republican ====
- Bill Brock, former U.S. Secretary of Labor and former U.S. Senator from Tennessee

=== Polling ===
Source	Date	Sarbanes (D)	Brock (R)
The Baltimore Sun	October 2, 1994	56%	33%

== Results ==
General election results
Party	Candidate	Votes	%
Democratic	Paul Sarbanes (incumbent)	809,125	59.10%
Republican	Bill Brock	559,908	40.90%
Independent	Terri Tilghman Deakyne (Write In)	71	0.01%
Total votes		1,369,104	100.0%
Democratic hold			

=== Results by county ===
County	Paul S. Sarbanes Democratic		Bill Brock Republican		Terri T. Deakyne Independent		Margin		Total Votes Cast
County	#	%	#	%	#	%	#	%	Total Votes Cast
Allegany	11185	54.90%	9190	45.10%	0	0.00%	1995	9.79%	20375
Anne Arundel	66138	48.13%	71255	51.86%	14	0.01%	-5117	-3.72%	137407
Baltimore (City)	118796	81.69%	26632	18.31%	3	0.00%	92164	63.37%	145431
Baltimore (County)	126189	56.08%	98813	43.91%	33	0.01%	27376	12.17%	225035
Calvert	8978	50.23%	8896	49.77%	0	0.00%	82	0.46%	17874
Caroline	3089	47.52%	3411	52.48%	0	0.00%	-322	-4.95%	6500
Carroll	18386	42.46%	24913	57.53%	4	0.01%	-6527	-15.07%	43303
Cecil	9140	50.57%	8935	49.43%	0	0.00%	205	1.13%	18075
Charles	12986	51.70%	12131	48.30%	0	0.00%	855	3.40%	25117
Dorchester	4377	52.91%	3896	47.09%	0	0.00%	481	5.81%	8273
Frederick	21402	45.44%	25695	54.55%	3	0.01%	-4293	-9.11%	47100
Garrett	3273	42.30%	4465	57.70%	0	0.00%	-1192	-15.40%	7738
Harford	32269	50.38%	31779	49.62%	2	0.00%	490	0.77%	64050
Howard	40106	55.23%	32513	44.77%	1	0.00%	7593	10.46%	72620
Kent	3746	57.21%	2802	42.79%	0	0.00%	944	14.42%	6548
Montgomery	157737	62.61%	94197	37.39%	2	0.00%	63540	25.22%	251936
Prince George's	116485	73.20%	42650	26.80%	0	0.00%	73835	46.40%	159135
Queen Anne's	5370	48.77%	5637	51.19%	4	0.04%	-267	-2.42%	11011
St. Mary's	10484	55.95%	8255	44.05%	0	0.00%	2229	11.89%	18739
Somerset	3372	55.13%	2744	44.87%	0	0.00%	628	10.27%	6116
Talbot	4490	42.79%	6004	57.21%	0	0.00%	-1514	-14.43%	10494
Washington	13085	41.56%	18395	58.43%	3	0.01%	-5310	-16.87%	31483
Wicomico	11261	52.25%	10291	47.75%	0	0.00%	970	4.50%	21552
Worcester	6781	51.40%	6409	48.58%	2	0.02%	372	2.82%	13192
Total	809125	59.10%	559908	40.90%	71	0.01%	249217	18.20%	1369104

== See also ==
- 1994 United States Senate elections
- 1994 United States elections
