= Human Resources University =

- Established: February 08, 2011
- Affiliations: US Federal Government, OPM
- Provost: Kathryn M. Medina, Dr. Sydney Smith-Heimbrock
- Students: 50,000 registered
- Location: Washington, DC, USA; 38.894719°N 77.044150°W
- Address: 1900 E Street NW, Washington, D.C.
- Nicknames: HRU; HR University
- Website: HRU Website

The Human Resources University (commonly referred to as HR University or HRU) was a learning and development platform created as part of the United States Office of Personnel Management which serves as the national focal point for the development and delivery of human resources training to enhance the capabilities of the Federal workforce. HRU provided services to Federal human resources contractor personnel as well. HRU had more than 50,000 registered students from across the Federal government. In 2014, HRU received recognition for saving the federal government over $100 million in cost savings in training costs.

HRU’s mission was to offer a learning environment to develop qualified human resources professionals across the United States Federal Government. HRU was the primary training organization for the Federal Human Resources Workforce, and provided formal and informal training for students both in the classroom and on the job.

== History ==
The Human Resource University is managed by the Office of Personnel Management and is affiliated with the Chief Human Capital Officers (CHCO) Council.

HRU was created as a result of critical necessity, identified in high-level studies by the Chief Human Capital Officers (CHCO) Council in 2009. This governance organization wanted to provide a professional career path and consistency of training content and opportunities for the Federal Human Resources Workforce. In 2011, HRU was founded by the CHCO Council, OPM, and with the assistance of the Executive Human Resources Community Leadership across the Federal Government. HRU was managed by a Provost who reports to the Director of the Office of Personnel Management.

The founding Provost, who was also a co-creator of HRU, was Kathryn Medina and she served in this capacity from 2011 to 2012, overseeing the successful launch of HRU. In its first two years, HRU had an impact on the government’s HR workforce, earning honors and recognition for the innovative platform that pooled government HR training together to reduce redundancy and waste.

=== Present day ===
As of September 14, 2018, HR University (HRU.gov) is no longer an active website. Users will still be able to access available resources via OPM.gov and Telework.gov.

== Leadership ==
HRU has had two provosts lead it throughout HRU's history:

- Kathryn Medina (2011–2012)
- Dr. Sydney Smith-Heimbrock (2012–present)

== Background information ==
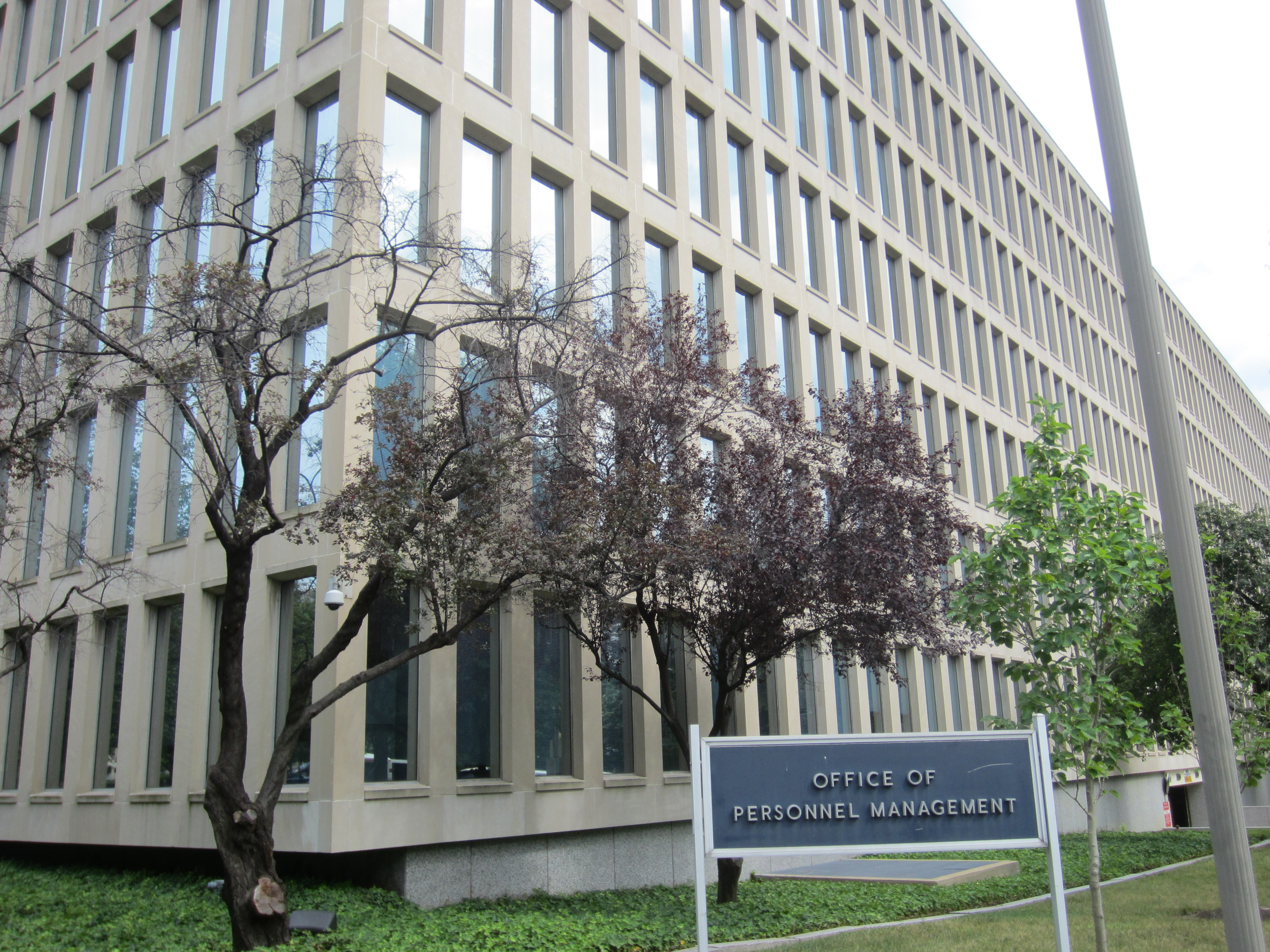
The Human Resources University is located within OPM Headquarters in Washington, D.C.

HRU was located at the United States Office of Personnel Management headquarters in Washington, DC. HRU served members of the Federal Human Resources Workforce who are located around the country and world. HRU was responsible for the training and career development of the more than 50,000 registered students, with an extensive virtual presence online.

== Strategic partnerships ==
HRU had strategic partnerships with American University, George Mason University, University of Maryland University College, and The Catholic University of America.

== See also ==
- United States Federal Government
- Office of Personnel Management
- List of colleges and universities in Washington, D.C.
