= Lawrence Hogan =

American politician from Maryland (1928–2017)

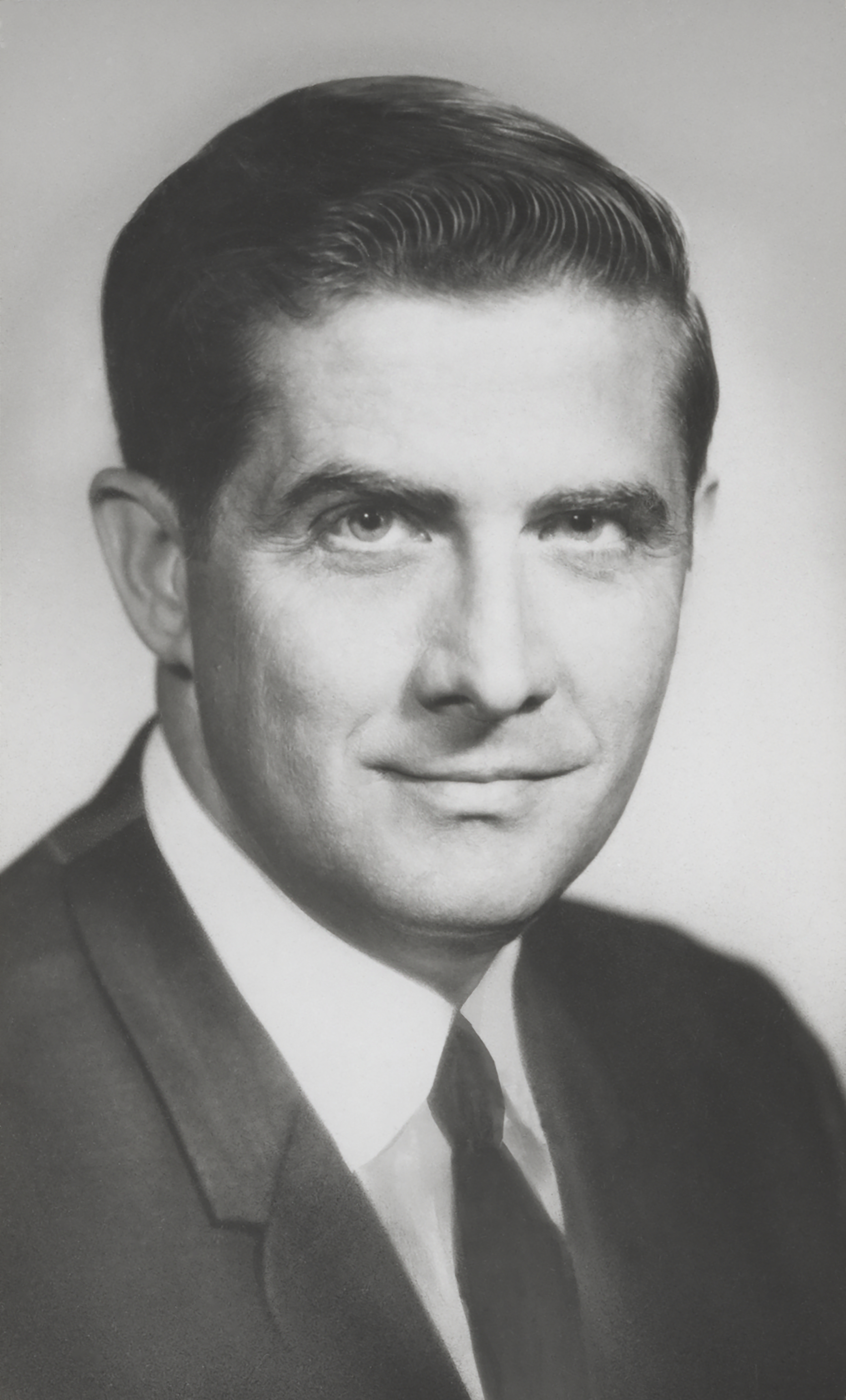

3rd Executive of Prince George's County
- In office March 9, 1978 – April 6, 1982
- Preceded by: Winfield M. Kelly Jr.
- Succeeded by: Parris Glendening

Member of the U.S. House of Representatives from Maryland's 5th district
- In office January 3, 1969 – January 3, 1975
- Preceded by: Hervey Machen
- Succeeded by: Gladys Spellman

Personal details
- Born: Lawrence Joseph Hogan; September 30, 1928 Boston, Massachusetts, U.S.
- Died: April 20, 2017 (aged 88) Annapolis, Maryland, U.S.
- Party: Republican
- Spouses: Nora Maguire (m. 1945; div. 1972); Ilona Modly (m. 1974)
- Children: 6, including Larry and Patrick
- Education: Georgetown University (BA, JD); San Francisco State University; American University (MA); University of Maryland, College Park

Lawrence Joseph Hogan Sr. (September 30, 1928 – April 20, 2017) was an American politician who served as a Republican U.S. representative for the 5th congressional district of Maryland from January 3, 1969, to January 3, 1975. In 1974, he was the only Republican representative to vote to recommend all three House articles of impeachment against President Richard Nixon. He was the father of the 62nd governor of Maryland, Larry Hogan.

Hogan did not run for re-election in 1974 and was unsuccessful that year in his candidacy for the Republican nomination for governor. He became county executive for Prince George's County, Maryland, in 1978 and served until 1982.

To date, he is the last Republican to have served as representative from Maryland's 5th congressional district.

== Early life and education ==
Born in Boston, on September 30, 1928, Hogan was raised in Washington, D.C., and attended Gonzaga College High School. He received his bachelor's degree from Georgetown University in 1949, J.D. from Georgetown in 1954, and was admitted to the Bar in the same year. While a college student, he worked for the Washington Times-Herald. He joined the FBI in 1948 and became a full-time agent while attending law school. He later was enrolled in graduate studies at San Francisco State College, 1956–1957, received a master's degree from American University in 1965, and continued studies at the University of Maryland, 1966–1967.

== Career ==
Hogan's private career included practicing law and public relations. His Larry Hogan Associates business was making $1 million a year before he sold it to enter politics.

In 1968, Hogan won against incumbent Hervey Machen to represent Maryland's 5th congressional district, and was re-elected in 1970 and 1972. Hogan was the only Republican on the House Judiciary Committee to vote for all three articles of impeachment against Richard Nixon when they were adopted in committee during the impeachment process against Nixon. Hogan pointedly said during the televised committee hearings:

The thing that's so appalling to me is that the President, when this whole idea was suggested to him, didn't, in righteous indignation, rise up and say, "Get out of here, you're in the office of the President of the United States. How can you talk about blackmail and bribery and keeping witnesses silent? This is the Presidency of the United States." But my President didn't do that. He sat there and he worked and worked to try to cover this thing up so it wouldn't come to light.

Hogan entered Maryland's 1974 gubernatorial race when polls showed him a strong challenger to incumbent Governor Marvin Mandel. Hogan's abandonment of Nixon, however, contributed to his loss in the Republican primary to Louise Gore, who in turn lost to Mandel. Political observers also attributed Hogan's loss to Gore's "genteel, low-key nature". Gladys Spellman was elected to take Hogan's former seat in Congress.

After his 1974 defeat, Hogan and his wife Ilona opened the law firm Hogan and Hogan, with offices in Forestville, Maryland, and Washington, D.C. In 1976, Hogan was elected a Maryland National Republican Committeeman, and in January 1977 he began working as executive vice-president of the Associated Builders and Contractors trade association. When he left the position to re-enter politics, he was being paid between $70,000 and $100,000 a year, equivalent to $494,000 in 2025.

In 1978, Hogan challenged incumbent Prince George's County Executive Win Kelly amid a 'tax revolt' and won the office with 60% of the vote. County voters passed a tax reform measure known as "TRIM" that same year.

Hogan challenged first-term Democratic Senator Paul Sarbanes (who was his House Judiciary Committee colleague during the Nixon impeachment) in 1982 and lost heavily. Parris Glendening was elected as county executive in his place, and Hogan's political career was over. He returned to practicing law, taught, and wrote books. His Legal Aspects of the Fire Service is used at training academies across the U.S. as of 2014.

== Personal life and death ==
Hogan married Ilona Maria Modly in 1974 after his first marriage to Nora Maguire ended with divorce in 1972 after 27 years. Ilona was elected to the Board of County Commissioners in Frederick County after they moved there, serving from 1994 to 2001. Two of Hogan's six children are also politically involved in the state of Maryland. Patrick N. Hogan was formerly a Republican Delegate representing Maryland's District 3A. Hogan's eldest son, Larry Hogan, was the Governor of Maryland from 2015 to 2023 after defeating then Lieutenant Governor Anthony Brown in 2014 by a margin of 3.78%, and then securing reelection in 2018 against former NAACP Executive Director Ben Jealous with a margin of 11.5%, becoming the first Republican since 1954 to win reelection as Governor. Larry Hogan was also the Republican nominee for the 2024 US Senate election in Maryland, running against Prince George's County Executive Angela Alsobrooks.

On April 15, 2017, Hogan had a severe stroke and died five days later, on April 20, at a hospital in Annapolis, Maryland, aged 88.

U.S. House of Representatives
Preceded by Hervey Machen	Member of the U.S. House of Representatives from Maryland's 5th congressional district 1969–1975	Succeeded by Gladys Spellman
Political offices
Preceded by Winfield M. Kelly Jr.	Executive of Prince George's County; 1978–1982	Succeeded by Parris Glendening
Party political offices
Preceded by John Beall	Republican nominee for U.S. Senator from Maryland (Class 1); 1982	Succeeded by Alan Keyes
