= Bill Brock =

American politician (1930–2021)

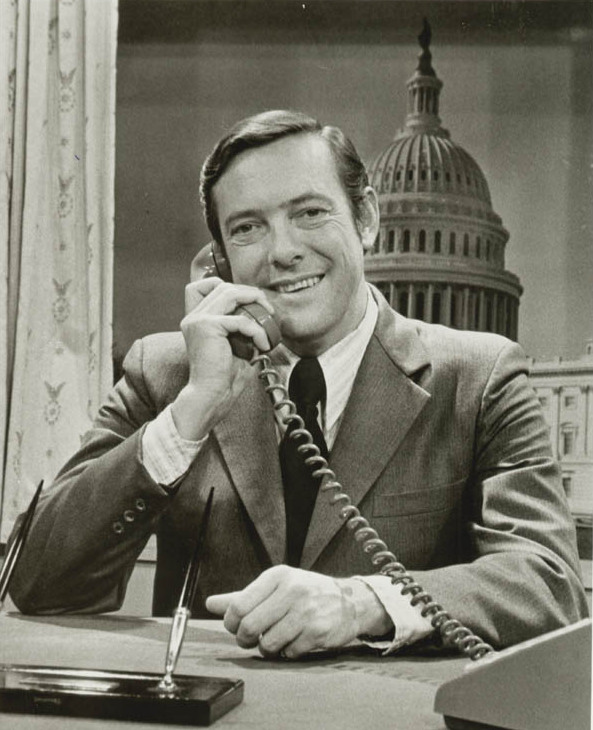

18th United States Secretary of Labor
- In office April 29, 1985 – October 31, 1987
- President: Ronald Reagan
- Preceded by: Raymond J. Donovan
- Succeeded by: Ann McLaughlin Korologos

8th United States Trade Representative
- In office January 23, 1981 – April 29, 1985
- President: Ronald Reagan
- Preceded by: Reubin Askew
- Succeeded by: Clayton Yeutter

50th Chair of the Republican National Committee
- In office January 14, 1977 – January 20, 1981
- Preceded by: Mary Louise Smith
- Succeeded by: Richard Richards

United States Senator from Tennessee
- In office January 3, 1971 – January 3, 1977
- Preceded by: Albert Gore Sr.
- Succeeded by: Jim Sasser

Member of the U.S. House of Representatives from Tennessee's 3rd district
- In office January 3, 1963 – January 3, 1971
- Preceded by: James B. Frazier Jr.
- Succeeded by: LaMar Baker

Personal details
- Born: William Emerson Brock III; November 23, 1930 Chattanooga, Tennessee, U.S.
- Died: March 25, 2021 (aged 90) Fort Lauderdale, Florida, U.S.
- Party: Republican
- Spouse(s): Laura Handly (m. 1957; died 1985) Sandra Schubert (m. 2000)
- Relations: William E. Brock (grandfather); John Kruesi (great-grandfather)
- Children: 4
- Education: Washington and Lee University (BA)

Military service
- Allegiance: United States
- Branch/service: United States Navy
- Years of service: 1953–1956

William Emerson Brock III (November 23, 1930 – March 25, 2021) was an American politician from Tennessee who served in both chambers of the United States Congress as a member of the United States House of Representatives for four terms representing Tennessee's 3rd congressional district from 1963 to 1971 and as a member of the United States Senate for one term from 1971 to 1977. He later served as the 50th Chair of the Republican National Committee from 1977 to 1981 and in the Cabinet of the United States from 1981 to 1987 under President of the United States Ronald Reagan as the 8th United States Trade Representative from 1981 to 1985 and as the 18th United States Secretary of Labor from 1985 to 1987. He was the grandson of William E. Brock, a member of the Democratic Party who served as a member of the U.S. Senate from the state of Tennessee from 1929 to 1931. Though the elder William Brock was a Democrat, the younger was a member of the Republican Party.

== Early life and career ==
Brock was born on November 23, 1930, in Chattanooga, Tennessee, where his family owned a well-known candy company. He was the son of William Emerson Brock Jr. and Myra (Kruesi). Brock is named after his grandfather, William E. Brock, who also served in the United States Senate. His maternal great-grandfather was John Kruesi, a machinist and close Thomas Edison associate who was originally from Appenzell, a historic canton in Switzerland.

Brock was a 1949 graduate of The McCallie School and a 1953 graduate of Washington and Lee University in Lexington, Virginia, in 1953 and subsequently served in the United States Navy until 1956. He then worked in his family's candy business. Brock had been reared as a Democrat, but became a Republican in the 1950s. In 1962, he was elected to Congress from Tennessee's 3rd congressional district, based in Chattanooga. The 3rd had long been the only Democratic outpost in traditionally heavily Republican East Tennessee; indeed, Brock's victory ended 40 years of Democratic control in the district.

Underlining the district's conservative bent, Brock was re-elected in 1964 by over nine points amid Lyndon B. Johnson's 44-state landslide. He was again re-elected in 1966 and 1968. During Brock's tenure in the House, he voted in favor of the Civil Rights Act of 1968 but voted against the Civil Rights Act of 1964 and the Voting Rights Act of 1965.

== U.S. Senator ==
Brock served four terms in the U.S. House of Representatives and then won the Republican nomination to face three-term incumbent U.S. Senator Albert Gore Sr. in 1970, defeating country music singer Tex Ritter in the primary election. Brock's campaign successfully made an issue of Gore's friendship with the Kennedy family and Gore's voting record, which was liberal by Southern standards, and defeated him.

While in the Senate, Brock was a darling of the conservative movement but was less popular at home; his personality was somewhat distant by the standards of most politicians. As a freshman U.S. Senate member, he accomplished a great deal even as a minority Republican. He was the original author of the Congressional Budget Act (S. 3984, 92nd Congress and S. 40, 93rd Congress) and as ranking minority of Committee on Government Operations, Subcommittee on Budgeting, Management, and Expenditures led the crafting of the Congressional Budget Bill. He sponsored credit legislation (Title V - Equal Credit Opportunity, H.R. 11211, 93rd Congress), memorialized by a National Archives and Records Administration exhibit, that provides woman's access to credit, including credit cards, by requiring financial institutions and other firms engaged in the extension of credit to make credit equally available to all and not to discriminate on the "basis of sex or marital status." He was co-chair of the Stevenson/Brock Committee (S. Res. 109, Temporary Select Committee to Study the Senate Committee System) with U.S. Senate member Adlai Stevenson III from Illinois, which sponsored establishment of the U.S. Senate Energy Committee as well as workload, scheduling, and staffing reforms and importantly reorganization of committee jurisdictions.

As a member of the Senate Finance Committee he promoted upgrading unemployment benefits, review of cash and non-cash benefits for low income, analysis of negative income tax experiments, transparency of markups, amendments to tax code, and introduced the first Senate tax indexing bill. Brock was a member of Paperwork Commission which according to Science's "Commission on Paperwork" editorial (September 23, 1977) issued 25 reports and 750 recommendations for cutting paperwork saving $3.5 million annually. He also drafted a 1975 resolution providing personal committee staffing for junior members (S. Res 60). In all, he worked closely with a broad coalition of Democrats and Republicans to bring those with widely ranging views together. That was appreciated by professional committee staff and members. His efforts contributed greatly to Congress's "Era of Cooperation" between 1971 and 1977 during which major reforms were accomplished including the Clean Water Act, Endangered Species Act of 1973, Safe Drinking Water Act of 1974, and Congressional Budget and Impoundment Control Act of 1974, all of which passed without opposition votes in the Senate.

He was considered vulnerable in the 1976 election cycle, and several prominent Democrats ran in the 1976 Democratic Senate primary for the right to challenge him. The most prominent and best-known name, at least initially, was probably 1970 gubernatorial nominee John Jay Hooker; somewhat surprisingly to most observers, the winner of the primary was Jim Sasser, who had managed Gore Sr.'s 1970 reelection campaign.

Sasser exploited lingering resentment of the Watergate scandal, which had concluded only about two years earlier. However his most effective campaign strategy was to emphasize how the affluent Brock, through skillful use of the tax code by his accountants, had paid less than $2,000 in income tax the previous year, an amount considerably less than that paid by many Tennesseans of far more modest means. Sasser was also aided by the popularity of the Democratic presidential candidate, Jimmy Carter, in Tennessee; the former Governor of Georgia who served from 1971 to 1975 would win the state by a double-digit margin. Although Brock had started with a 30-point lead in polls over Sasser, Brock lost his re-election bid by a 52% to 47% margin.

Prior to his Senate re-election run, Brock was among those considered to replace Nelson Rockefeller as President Gerald Ford's running mate in the 1976 election.

== Later career ==
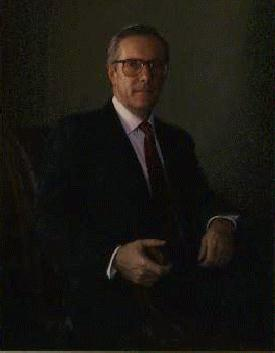
The official portrait of William E. Brock hangs in the Department of Labor

After leaving the Senate, Brock became the new chairman of the Republican National Committee, a position he held from 1977 to 1981.

=== Reagan cabinet ===
Upon the election of Ronald Reagan as U.S. president, Brock was appointed United States Trade Representative, a position he maintained until 1985, when he was made United States Secretary of Labor.

=== Dole campaign ===
Brock resigned his cabinet post in late 1987 to serve as the campaign manager for Kansas U.S. Senate member Bob Dole's presidential campaign. Dole, the runner-up to Vice President George H. W. Bush, was seen as a micromanager, who needed a strong personality like Brock to guide his campaign.

Brock's late start, in the fall of 1987, left little time to help find an avenue to cut into Bush's substantial lead in national polls. Additionally, many viewed Brock as an imperious and inadequate manager, who badly misspent campaign funds largely on national headquarters staff and left Dole without adequate money for a Super Tuesday media buy. Dole and Brock had a public falling-out, and Brock publicly fired two of Dole's favored consultants and ordering them off the campaign plane. Dole dropped out of the race in late March 1988 after he had lost key primaries in New Hampshire, the South, and Illinois.

=== Senate campaign ===
Brock became a consultant in the Washington, D.C., area. By that point, he had become a legal resident of Maryland. In 1994 he won the Republican U.S. Senate primary in Maryland over the future convict Ruthann Aron but was soundly defeated 59% to 41% in the general election by the Democratic incumbent, Paul Sarbanes.

=== Awards and affiliations ===
In 1990, Brock was awarded the New Zealand 1990 Commemoration Medal. Brock was a member of the ReFormers Caucus of Issue One.

== Personal life ==
Brock married Laura Handly in 1957. They had four children and remained married until her death from cancer in 1985. He later married Sandra Schubert.

== Death ==
Brock died from pneumonia in Fort Lauderdale, Florida, on March 25, 2021, at age 90.

U.S. House of Representatives
Preceded by James Frazier	Member of the U.S. House of Representatives from Tennessee's 3rd congressional district 1963–1971	Succeeded by LaMar Baker
Party political offices
Preceded by Dan Kuykendall	Republican nominee for U.S. Senator from Tennessee (Class 1); 1970, 1976	Succeeded by Robin Beard
Preceded by Peter Dominick	Chair of the National Republican Senatorial Committee; 1973–1975	Succeeded by Ted Stevens
Preceded by Mary Louise Smith	Chair of the Republican National Committee; 1977–1981	Succeeded by Richard Richards
Preceded by Alan Keyes	Republican nominee for U.S. Senator from Maryland (Class 1); 1994	Succeeded by Paul Rappaport
U.S. Senate
Preceded by Albert Gore Sr.	U.S. Senator (Class 1) from Tennessee; 1971–1977; Served alongside: Howard Baker	Succeeded by Jim Sasser
New office	Co-Chair of the Senate Committee System Study Committee; 1976–1977; Served alongside: Adlai Stevenson III	Succeeded by Bob Packwood
Political offices
Preceded by Reubin Askew	United States Trade Representative; 1981–1985	Succeeded by Clayton Yeutter
Preceded by Raymond J. Donovan	United States Secretary of Labor; 1985–1987	Succeeded by Ann McLaughlin
