= Richard Lankford =

American politician (1914–2003)

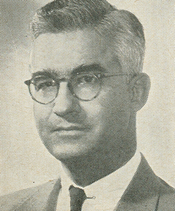

Member of the U.S. House of Representatives from Maryland's 5th district
- In office January 3, 1955 – January 3, 1965
- Preceded by: Frank Small, Jr.
- Succeeded by: Hervey Machen

Member of the Maryland House of Delegates
- In office 1948–1954

Personal details
- Born: July 22, 1914 Wilmington, Delaware, U.S.
- Died: September 22, 2003 (aged 89) Easton, Maryland, U.S.
- Party: Democratic

Richard Estep Lankford (July 22, 1914 – September 22, 2003) represented the fifth district of the state of Maryland in the United States House of Representatives for five terms from 1955 to 1965.

Lankford was born in Wilmington, Delaware, and attended private schools in Baltimore, Maryland, and at Episcopal High School in Alexandria, Virginia. He received his B.S. degree from the University of Virginia at Charlottesville in 1937, and his LL.B. degree from the University of Maryland, Baltimore in 1940. He was employed as a lawyer in private practice, and engaged in active management of tobacco and cattle farms.

During World War II, Lankford served in the United States Naval Reserve from 1942 to 1946. After the war, he was a member of the Maryland House of Delegates from 1948 to 1954, and was an unsuccessful Democratic candidate for election to the U.S. Congress in 1952.

He served on the Maryland Legislative Council in 1953, and was a delegate to the Democratic National Convention of 1956 before being elected to the U.S. Congress in 1954. He served from January 3, 1955, to January 3, 1965, but was not a candidate for renomination in 1964. Lankford did not sign the 1956 Southern Manifesto, and voted in favor of the Civil Rights Acts of 1957 and 1960, as well as the 24th Amendment to the U.S. Constitution, but voted present on the Civil Rights Act of 1964. During his time in Congress, Lankford had a predominantly liberal voting record, based on his votes on key issues.

He died in Easton, Maryland, aged 89.

U.S. House of Representatives
Preceded by Frank Small, Jr.	Member of the U.S. House of Representatives from Maryland's 5th congressional district 1955-1965	Succeeded by Hervey Machen
