= William C. Bilo =

United States Army general

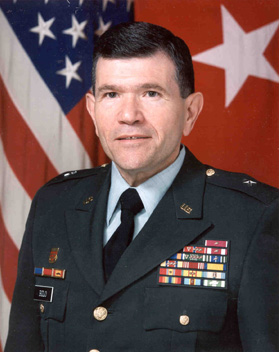
- Brigadier General William Bilo, Deputy Director of the Army National Guard
- Born: November 15, 1944 (age 81); Washington, D.C., U.S.
- Military career
- Branch: United States Army
- Service years: 1964–1997
- Rank: Brigadier general
- Unit: Army National Guard
- Commands: Battery B, 4th Battalion, 41st Artillery Regiment; Battery B, 77th Artillery Regiment; Service Battery, 30th Field Artillery, 1st Cavalry Division; 29th Division Support Command (DISCOM)
- Awards: Distinguished Service Medal (U.S. Army); Legion of Merit; Bronze Star Medal; Meritorious Service Medal; Air Medal; Army Commendation Medal; Army Achievement Medal

William C. Bilo (born November 15, 1944) is a retired United States Army Brigadier General who served as deputy director of the Army National Guard.

== Early life ==
William C. Bilo was born in Washington, D.C., on November 15, 1944. He enlisted in the Army in 1964 and received his commission as a Second Lieutenant of Artillery after graduation from Officer Candidate School at Fort Sill.

Bilo was qualified on Pershing missiles. After serving as an instructor at the Artillery school, Bilo served in West Germany, including command of B Battery, 1st Battalion, 41st Field Artillery Regiment.

== Vietnam War ==
Bilo served two tours in Vietnam, first as Commander of Battery B, 77th Artillery Regiment and then as Commander of Service Battery, 30th Field Artillery, 1st Cavalry Division.

== Post Vietnam War ==
After the war Bilo continued his military career as a member of the National Guard in Oklahoma, Virginia and Maryland. In 1984 he was one of the officers who helped organize the reactivation of the 29th Infantry Division, and he was the division's chief of staff until 1987. He subsequently served as Chief of Staff of the Maryland Army National Guard and commander of the 29th Division Support Command (DISCOM).

== Deputy Director, Army National Guard ==
In 1993 Bilo was selected to serve as deputy director of the Army National Guard and promoted to Brigadier General. He served until retiring in 1997. He was succeeded by Michael J. Squier.

== Education ==
Bilo completed a Bachelor of Arts Degree in History from Cameron University, and a master's degree in Business and Public Administration from Southeastern University.

His military education includes the United States Army Command and General Staff College and the United States Army War College.

== Awards and decorations ==
Bilo's awards include:

Distinguished Service Medal (U.S. Army)

Legion of Merit with one bronze oak leaf cluster

Bronze Star Medal with three bronze oak leaf clusters and "V" device

Meritorious Service Medal with one bronze oak leaf cluster

Air Medal

Army Commendation Medal with four oak leaf clusters and "V" device

Army Achievement Medal with one bronze oak leaf cluster

Selective Service System Meritorious Service Medal

Army Good Conduct Medal

Army Reserve Components Achievement Medal with three bronze oak leaf clusters

National Defense Service Medal with one bronze service star

Vietnam Service Medal with two bronze service stars

Armed Forces Reserve Medal with Silver hourglass device

Army Service Ribbon

Overseas Service Ribbon with numeral 1

Republic of Vietnam Campaign Medal

=== Other awards ===
Bilo is a member of the Fort Sill Officer Candidate School Hall of Fame and a Distinguished Alumnus of Cameron University.

== Later career ==
After retiring from the Bilo operated a consulting firm, Rainbow Enterprises and resided in the suburbs of Baltimore, Maryland. He has been a member of several government task forces and advisory panels, primarily those involved with veterans' benefits and veterans' memorials. He was also active in several professional organizations, including serving as a Vice President of the Field Artillery Association.

== Legacy ==
The Field Artillery Association presents the William C. Bilo Support Forward Award to recognize a soldier in any component of the Army who best represents the qualities of leadership, teamwork, and caring for soldiers.
