= Hervey Machen =

American politician

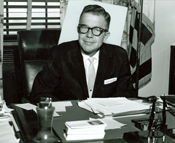

Member of the U.S. House of Representatives from Maryland's 5th district
- In office January 3, 1965 – January 3, 1969
- Preceded by: Richard E. Lankford
- Succeeded by: Lawrence Hogan

Member of the Maryland House of Delegates
- In office 1954-1962

Personal details
- Born: October 14, 1916 Washington, D.C., U.S.
- Died: November 29, 1994 (aged 78) Annapolis, Maryland, U.S.
- Party: Democratic

Hervey Gilbert Machen (October 14, 1916 – November 29, 1994) represented the fifth district of the state of Maryland in the United States House of Representatives for two terms from 1965 to 1969.

== Early life and education ==
Machen was born in Washington, D.C., and graduated from Hyattsville High School in nearby Hyattsville, Maryland. He received his B.A. degree from the University of Maryland, College Park, his LL.B. degree and LL.M. degree from Southeastern University (Washington, D.C.) in 1939 and 1941 respectively.

== Career ==
During World War II, Machen served in the United States Army from 1941 to 1946. After the War, he became a banker and a lawyer, later serving as a member of the Maryland House of Delegates from 1954 to 1962. He served as assistant attorney in the Office of the Maryland State's Attorney of Prince George's County, Maryland from 1947 to 1951. He was city attorney for Cheverly, Maryland and Hyattsville from 1949 to 1958.

Machen was elected as a Democrat to the U.S. Congress in 1964, serving two terms from January 3, 1965, to January 3, 1969. Machen voted in favor of the Voting Rights Act of 1965 and the Civil Rights Act of 1968. He was an unsuccessful candidate for re-election in 1968, and an unsuccessful candidate for nomination to Congress again in 1970. He died in Annapolis, Maryland, and is interred in St. Barnabas Episcopal Church Cemetery of Temple Hills, Maryland.

U.S. House of Representatives
| Preceded by Richard Lankford | Member of the U.S. House of Representatives from Maryland's 5th congressional district 1965 – 1969 | Succeeded by Lawrence Hogan |
