= 2000 United States Senate election in Maryland =

- November 7, 2000
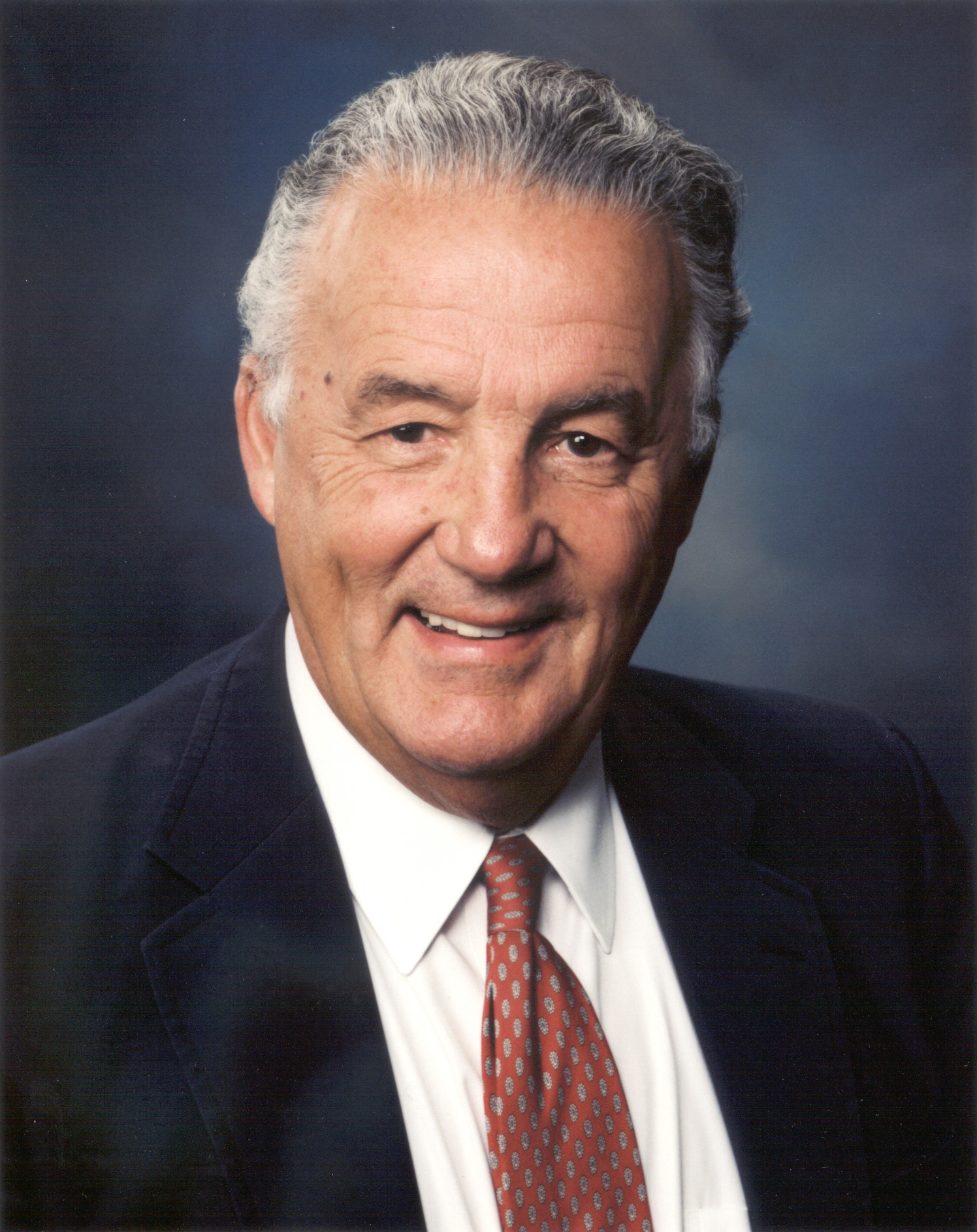

Nominee	Paul Sarbanes	Paul Rappaport
Party	Democratic	Republican
Popular vote	1,230,013	715,178
Percentage	63.18%	36.73%
- County results Sarbanes: 50–60% 60–70% 80–90% Rappaport: 50–60% 60–70%
U.S. senator before election
Paul Sarbanes
Democratic
Elected U.S. Senator
Paul Sarbanes
Democratic

The 2000 United States Senate election in Maryland was held on November 7, 2000. Democratic incumbent Paul Sarbanes was re-elected to a fifth term over former Howard County police chief Paul Rappaport.

== Republican primary ==
=== Candidates ===
- Robin Ficker, former state delegate from Montgomery County and perennial candidate
- Ross Z. Pierpont
- Paul H. Rappaport, former Howard County police chief and 1994 nominee for lieutenant governor
- Rob Sobhani, Georgetown University adjunct professor of political economy
- John Stafford, 1998 candidate for Senate
- Kenneth R. Timmerman, journalist covering the American military and Middle East affairs
- Kenneth Wayman

=== Results ===
Rappaport won through a grassroots movement with a plurality of just 23 percent of the vote.

== General election ==
=== Candidates ===
- Paul Sarbanes, incumbent U.S. senator since 1977
- Paul H. Rappaport, former Howard County police chief and 1994 nominee for lieutenant governor

=== Debates ===
Rappaport, a major underdog, pushed for three debates. Sarbanes agreed to one debate on October 26.

=== Polling ===
Poll source	Date(s)	Sample size	Margin of error	Paul Sarbanes (D)	Paul Rappaport (R)	Other / undecided (Note: Calculated by taking the difference of 100% and all other candidates combined.)
Harris Insights & Analytics	November 3, 2000	5,198	—	62%	37%	1%
Gonzales Research & Marketing Strategies Inc.	October 27, 2000	627	—	63%	30%	7%
Mason-Dixon Polling & Strategy	October 26, 2000	625	—	59%	30%	11%
Rasmussen Reports	October 26, 2000	696	—	57%	37%	6%

=== Results ===
General election results
Party	Candidate	Votes	%	±%
Democratic	Paul Sarbanes (incumbent)	1,230,013	63.18%	+4.08%
Republican	Paul Rappaport	715,178	36.73%	−4.17%
Other	Write Ins	1,594	0.08%	
Independent	Corrogan R. Vaughn (Write In)	113	0.01%	
Total votes		1,946,898	100.0%	
Democratic hold				

==== Results by county ====
County	Paul S. Sarbanes Democratic		Paul H. Rappaport Republican		Corrogan R. Vaughn Independent		Write-ins Independent		Margin		Total Votes Cast
County	#	%	#	%	#	%	#	%	#	%	Total Votes Cast
Allegany	12638	59.03%	8768	40.96%	0	0.00%	2	0.01%	3870	18.08%	21408
Anne Arundel	101627	51.44%	95737	48.46%	17	0.01%	177	0.09%	5890	2.98%	197558
Baltimore (City)	158260	86.75%	24019	13.17%	5	0.00%	157	0.09%	134241	73.58%	182441
Baltimore (County)	175551	58.82%	122601	41.08%	0	0.00%	302	0.10%	52950	17.74%	298454
Calvert	15305	52.87%	13618	47.04%	4	0.01%	24	0.08%	1687	5.83%	28951
Caroline	4239	48.62%	4472	51.29%	1	0.01%	7	0.08%	-233	-2.67%	8719
Carroll	23781	37.97%	38790	61.94%	0	0.00%	59	0.09%	-15009	-23.96%	62630
Cecil	14168	50.33%	13955	49.58%	1	0.00%	24	0.09%	213	0.76%	28148
Charles	25278	57.95%	18321	42.00%	1	0.00%	24	0.06%	6957	15.95%	43624
Dorchester	5724	57.24%	4276	42.76%	0	0.00%	0	0.00%	1448	14.48%	10000
Frederick	37315	48.83%	39031	51.07%	3	0.00%	76	0.10%	-1716	-2.25%	76425
Garrett	4319	42.44%	5858	57.56%	0	0.00%	0	0.00%	-1539	-15.12%	10177
Harford	41679	46.27%	48322	53.65%	8	0.01%	68	0.08%	-6643	-7.37%	90077
Howard	62636	56.66%	47786	43.23%	22	0.02%	97	0.09%	14850	13.43%	110541
Kent	4346	55.50%	3481	44.45%	0	0.00%	4	0.05%	865	11.05%	7831
Montgomery	250664	69.42%	109911	30.44%	41	0.01%	447	0.12%	140753	38.98%	361063
Prince George's	204622	83.63%	40033	16.36%	5	0.00%	13	0.01%	164589	67.27%	244673
Queen Anne's	7539	46.19%	8775	53.76%	2	0.01%	7	0.04%	-1236	-7.57%	16323
St. Mary's	4681	64.84%	2536	35.13%	0	0.00%	2	0.03%	2145	29.71%	7219
Somerset	15273	53.31%	13357	46.62%	0	0.00%	21	0.07%	1916	6.69%	28651
Talbot	6996	47.14%	7820	52.70%	1	0.01%	23	0.15%	-824	-5.55%	14840
Washington	22362	48.94%	23291	50.98%	2	0.00%	35	0.08%	-929	-2.03%	45690
Wicomico	18946	60.74%	12234	39.22%	0	0.00%	14	0.04%	6712	21.52%	31194
Worcester	12064	59.54%	8186	40.40%	0	0.00%	11	0.05%	3878	19.14%	20261
Total	1230013	63.18%	715178	36.73%	113	0.01%	1594	0.08%	514835	26.44%	1946898

===== Counties that flipped from Republican to Democratic =====
- Anne Arundel (largest municipality: Annapolis)

===== Counties that flipped from Democratic to Republican =====
- Harford (largest municipality: Aberdeen)

== See also ==
- 2000 United States Senate elections
- 2000 United States elections
