= 1988 United States Senate election in Maryland =

- November 8, 1988
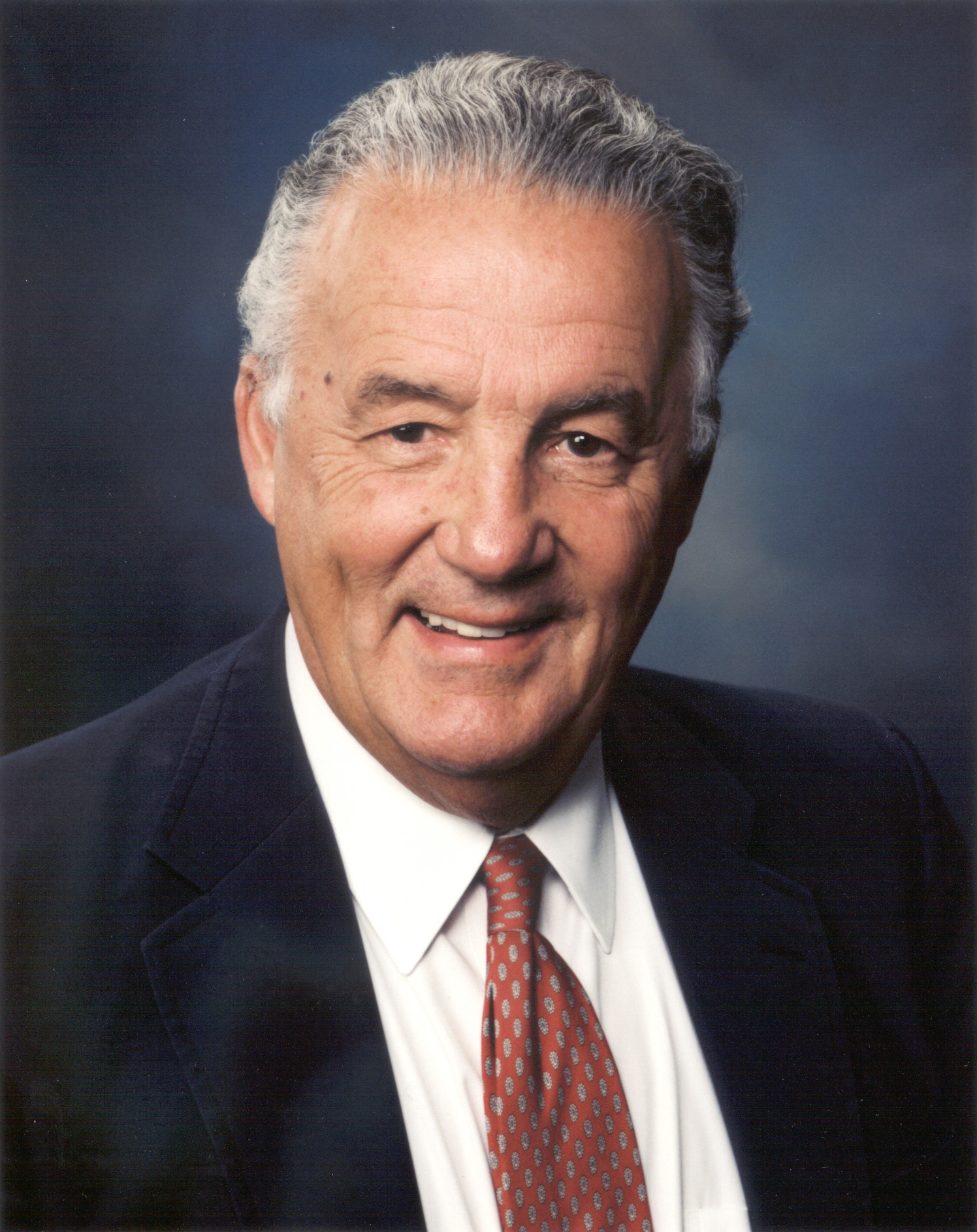

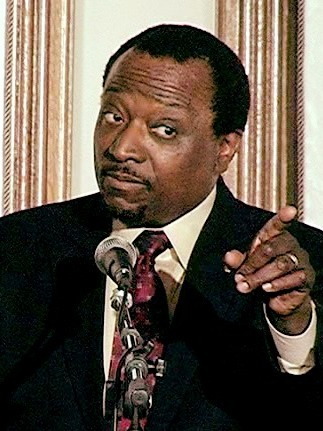
Nominee	Paul Sarbanes	Alan Keyes
Party	Democratic	Republican
Popular vote	999,166	617,537
Percentage	61.79%	38.19%
- County results Sarbanes: 50–60% 60–70% 70–80% Keyes: 50–60%
U.S. senator before election
Paul Sarbanes
Democratic
Elected U.S. Senator
Paul Sarbanes
Democratic

The 1988 United States Senate election in Maryland was held on November 8, 1988. Incumbent Democratic U.S. Senator Paul Sarbanes was reelected to a third term in a landslide. As in 1982, Sarbanes won strongly Republican Garrett County, which has never supported a Democratic presidential candidate and has not voted Democratic in a Senate election since this election. This is the last time that Maryland voted for a Senate candidate and a presidential candidate of different political parties.

== Candidates ==
=== Democratic ===
- Paul Sarbanes, incumbent U.S. Senator

=== Republican ===
- Alan Keyes, former Assistant Secretary of State for International Organization Affairs

== Results ==
General election results
Party	Candidate	Votes	%
Democratic	Paul Sarbanes (incumbent)	999,166	61.79%
Republican	Alan Keyes	617,537	38.19%
Independent	Imad A. Ahmad (Write-in)	349	0.02%
Independent	Rashaad Ali (Write-in)	13	0.00%
Total votes		1,617,065	100.0%
Democratic hold			

=== Results by county ===
County	Paul S. Sarbanes Democratic		Alan Keyes Republican		Rashaad Ali Independent		Imad A. Ahmad Independent		Margin		Total Votes Cast
County	#	%	#	%	#	%	#	%	#	%	Total Votes Cast
Allegany	14991	59.38%	10254	40.62%	0	0.00%	0	0.00%	4737	18.76%	25245
Anne Arundel	77647	54.41%	65053	45.58%	2	0.00%	7	0.00%	12594	8.82%	142709
Baltimore (City)	175059	79.82%	44231	20.17%	6	0.00%	22	0.01%	130828	59.65%	219318
Baltimore (County)	157701	58.63%	111251	41.36%	1	0.00%	15	0.01%	46450	17.27%	268968
Calvert	7915	50.08%	7890	49.92%	0	0.00%	0	0.00%	25	0.16%	15805
Caroline	3543	55.50%	2841	44.50%	0	0.00%	0	0.00%	702	11.00%	6384
Carroll	19305	46.12%	22551	53.87%	1	0.00%	3	0.01%	-3246	-7.75%	41860
Cecil	10607	56.92%	8022	43.05%	0	0.00%	7	0.04%	2585	13.87%	18636
Charles	16238	56.35%	12580	43.65%	0	0.00%	0	0.00%	3658	12.69%	28818
Dorchester	4979	56.20%	3881	43.80%	0	0.00%	0	0.00%	1098	12.39%	8860
Frederick	23997	49.55%	24423	50.43%	0	0.00%	10	0.02%	-426	-0.88%	48430
Garrett	3882	51.41%	3669	48.59%	0	0.00%	0	0.00%	213	2.82%	7551
Harford	33192	54.25%	27992	45.75%	0	0.00%	4	0.01%	5200	8.50%	61188
Howard	43521	54.30%	36602	45.67%	2	0.00%	18	0.02	6919	8.63%	80143
Kent	3488	59.76%	2349	40.24%	0	0.00%	0	0.00%	1139	19.51%	5837
Montgomery	198484	62.45%	119155	37.49%	0	0.00%	206	0.06%	79329	24.96%	317845
Prince George's	143485	69.65%	62476	30.33%	1	0.00%	56	0.03%	81009	39.32%	206018
Queen Anne's	5636	53.01%	4996	46.99%	0	0.00%	0	0.00%	640	6.02%	10632
St. Mary's	10478	58.98%	7285	41.01%	0	0.00%	1	0.01%	3193	17.97%	17764
Somerset	3200	52.08%	2944	47.92%	0	0.00%	0	0.00%	256	4.17%	6144
Talbot	5523	50.40%	5435	49.60%	0	0.00%	0	0.00%	88	0.80%	10958
Washington	17513	49.77%	17674	50.23%	0	0.00%	0	0.00%	-161	-0.46%	35187
Wicomico	12468	52.22%	11406	47.78%	0	0.00%	0	0.00%	1062	4.45%	23874
Worcester	6314	53.10%	5577	46.90%	0	0.00%	0	0.00%	737	6.20%	11891
Total	999166	61.67%	620537	38.30%	13	0.00%	349	0.02%	378629	23.37%	1620065

== See also ==
- 1988 United States Senate elections
- 1988 United States elections
