= Paul Sarbanes =

American politician and attorney (1933–2020)

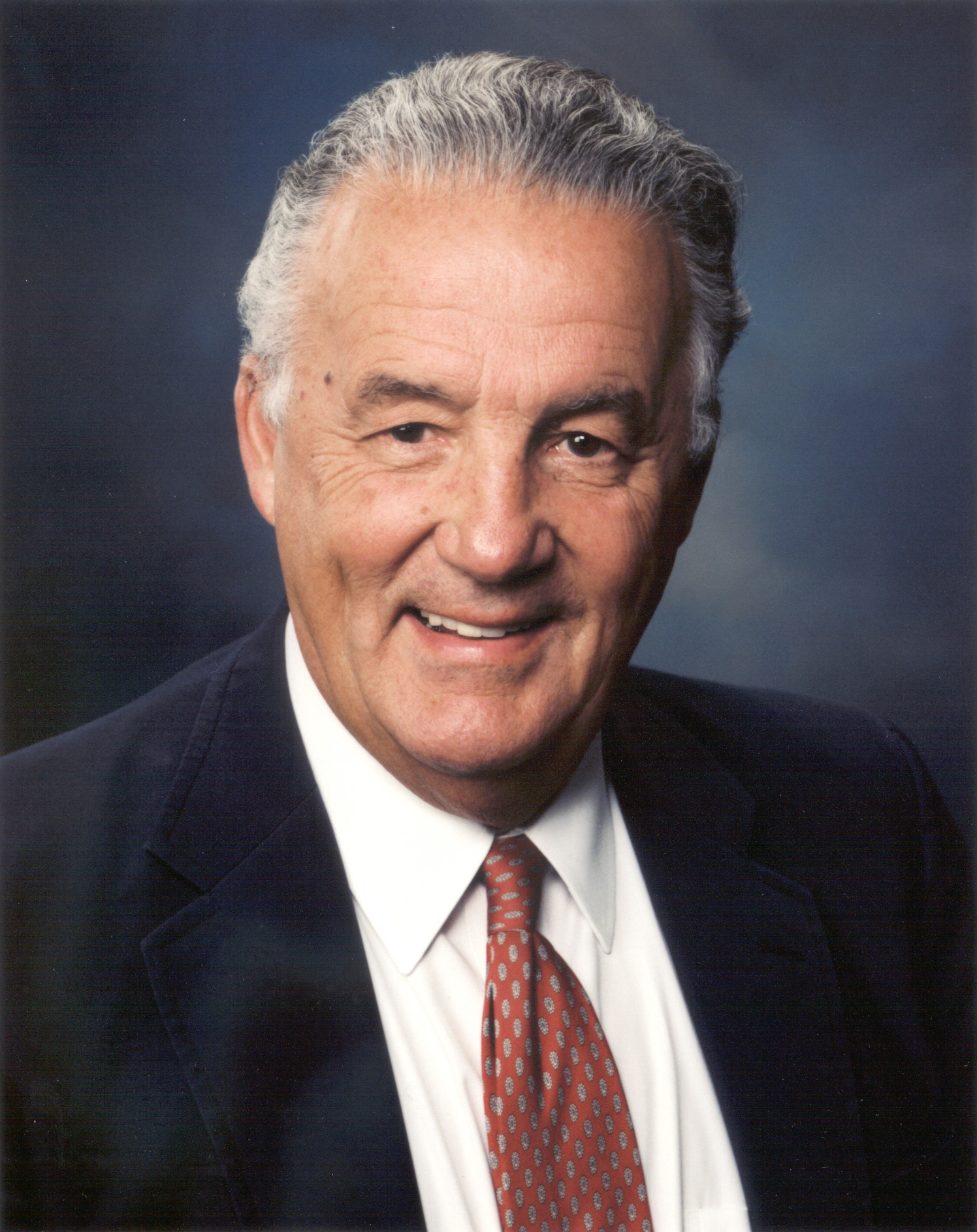

United States Senator from Maryland
- In office January 3, 1977 – January 3, 2007
- Preceded by: J. Glenn Beall Jr.
- Succeeded by: Ben Cardin

Chair of the Senate Banking Committee
- In office January 3, 2001 – January 20, 2001
- Preceded by: Phil Gramm
- Succeeded by: Phil Gramm
- In office June 6, 2001 – January 3, 2003
- Preceded by: Phil Gramm
- Succeeded by: Richard Shelby

Member of the U.S. House of Representatives from Maryland
- In office January 3, 1971 – January 3, 1977
- Preceded by: George Hyde Fallon
- Succeeded by: Barbara Mikulski
- Constituency: 4th district (1971–1973); 3rd district (1973–1977)

Member of the Maryland House of Delegates from the 2nd district
- In office January 18, 1967 – January 13, 1971

Personal details
- Born: Paul Spyros Sarbanes; February 3, 1933 Salisbury, Maryland, U.S.
- Died: December 6, 2020 (aged 87) Baltimore, Maryland, U.S.
- Party: Democratic
- Spouse: Christine Dunbar (m. 1960; died 2009)
- Children: 3, including John
- Education: Princeton University (BA); Balliol College, Oxford (BA); Harvard University (LLB)
- Sarbanes's voice Sarbanes delivers his opening statement on the first day of the Iran–Contra hearings Recorded May 5, 1987

Paul Spyros Sarbanes (/ˈsɑːrbeɪnz/; February 3, 1933 – December 6, 2020) was an American politician and attorney from Maryland. A member of the Democratic Party, he served in both chambers of the United States Congress as a member of the United States House of Representatives from 1971 to 1977 and as a member of the United States Senate from 1977 to 2007. Sarbanes was the longest-serving senator in the history of Maryland until he was surpassed by Barbara Mikulski by a single day when her term ended on January 3, 2017. (Note: Both Sarbanes and Mikulski served five terms (thirty years) in the Senate. However, due to a differing number of leap days over their tenures, Mikulski finished with 10,958 days of Senate service, to Sarbanes's 10,957 days.) He was the first Greek American senator.

Born in Salisbury, Maryland, Sarbanes was a graduate of Princeton University; Balliol College, Oxford; and Harvard Law School. Elected to the Maryland House of Delegates in 1966, he went on to serve two terms in the Maryland House from 1967 to 1971. In 1970 he won a seat in the United States House of Representatives, representing Maryland's 4th congressional district and later Maryland's 3rd congressional district from 1971 to 1977.

In 1976 he ran for the United States Senate, defeating Republican incumbent J. Glenn Beall Jr. with 59% of the vote. Sarbanes was re-elected four times, each time receiving no less than 59% of the vote. He did not seek re-election in 2006, when he was succeeded by fellow Democrat Ben Cardin. Sarbanes was known for his low-key style, often shunning the limelight over his thirty-year Senate career. He was a coauthor of the Sarbanes–Oxley Act, which is generally noted as his most important piece of legislation.

== Early life ==
Sarbanes was born on Maryland's Eastern Shore in the city of Salisbury to Greek immigrant parents, Matina (née Tsigounis) and Spyros P. Sarbanes, who had emigrated from Laconia, Greece and owned a Salisbury restaurant.

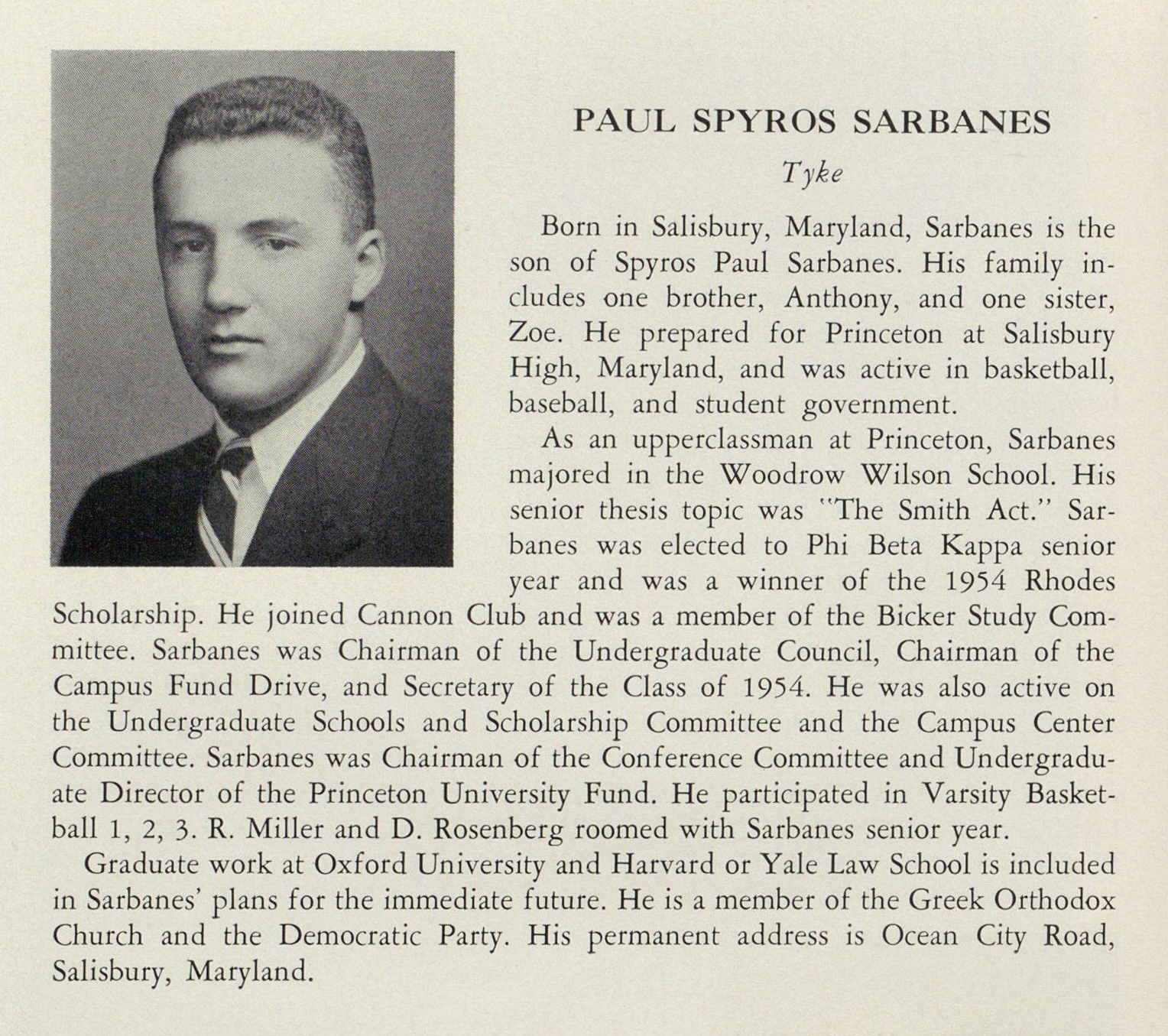
Sarbanes in the Princeton University yearbook, 1954

A graduate of Wicomico High School in Salisbury, Maryland, Sarbanes attended Princeton University, where he played basketball and earned a bachelor's degree in 1954 from the Princeton School of Public and International Affairs after completing a senior thesis titled "The Smith Act: A Denial of American Freedoms". At Princeton, Sarbanes was a member of the American Whig–Cliosophic Society. As a senior, he received the Moses Taylor Pyne Honor Prize, Princeton's highest undergraduate honor. He also was awarded a Rhodes Scholarship that brought him to Balliol College of the University of Oxford in Oxford, England. He graduated with a First Class degree in 1957. Sarbanes then returned to the United States and attended Harvard Law School.

After graduating in 1960, he clerked for Federal Judge Morris Ames Soper before entering private practice with two Baltimore law firms.

== Political career ==
=== State legislature ===
In 1966, Sarbanes ran for the Maryland House of Delegates in Baltimore and won. During his four years as a State delegate in Annapolis, Maryland, he served on both the Judiciary and the Ways and Means Committees.

=== U.S. House of Representatives ===
Sarbanes was elected to the United States House of Representatives in 1970 from Maryland's 4th congressional district and was reelected in 1972 and 1974 from Maryland's 3rd congressional district. While in the House, Sarbanes served on the Judiciary Committee, the Merchant Marine and Fisheries Committee, and the Select Committee on House Reorganization.

As a member of the Judiciary Committee, he participated in the impeachment process against Richard Nixon. On July 26, 1974, he introduced the first articles of impeachment against President Nixon for obstruction of justice.

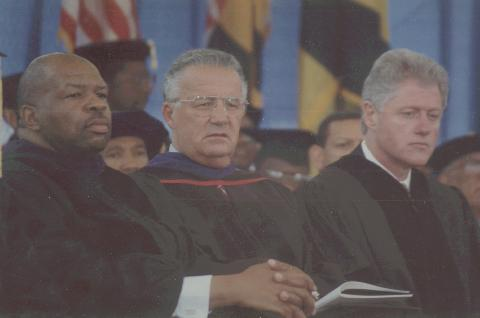
Sarbanes (center) with President Bill Clinton (his left) and Representative Elijah Cummings at the Morgan State University graduation in May 1997

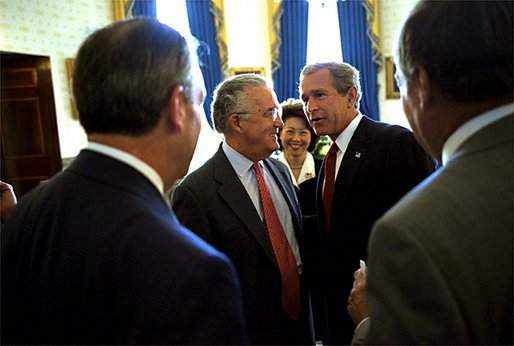
Before signing the Sarbanes–Oxley Act on July 30, 2002, President George W. Bush (right) met with Senator Sarbanes (left), Secretary of Labor Elaine Chao and other dignitaries in the Blue Room of the White House.

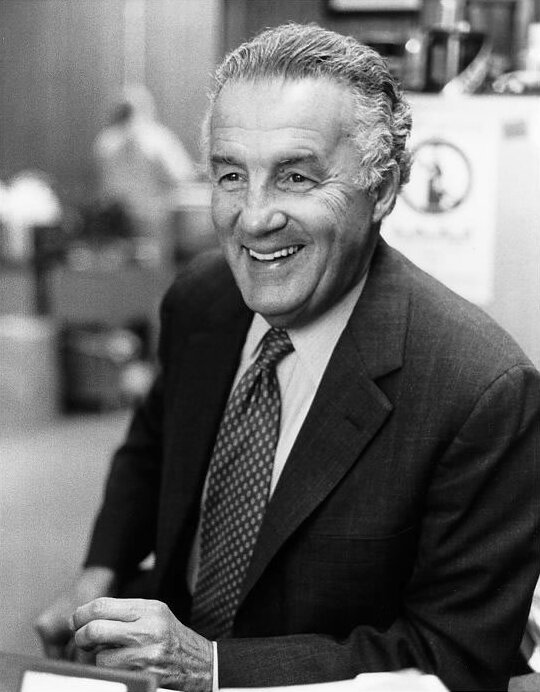
An earlier photograph of Senator Sarbanes

=== U.S. Senate ===
Sarbanes was elected to the United States Senate in 1976. He was re-elected in 1982, 1988, 1994, and 2000. In 2002, he was the U.S. Senate sponsor of the Sarbanes–Oxley Act of 2002, which reformed federal securities laws in the wake of the 2002 accounting scandals.

Sarbanes served on the following Senate committees:

- Ranking Member, Banking, Housing and Urban Affairs
- Ranking Member, Special Whitewater
- Senior Member, Foreign Relations
- Senior Member, Budget
- Senior Member, Joint Economic

By 1981, Sarbanes had become noted as a frequent critic of military budgets. In spite of this, in May of that year he voted in favor of approving a Reagan administration-backed $136.5 billion military authorization bill. In December, he voted in favor of an amendment to President Ronald Reagan's MX missiles proposal that would divert the silo system by $334 million as well as earmark further research for other methods that would allow giant missiles to be based. While the military authorization bill was seen as supporting the administration, the December vote was viewed as a rebuff of Reagan.

On March 11, 2005, Sarbanes, the longest-serving senator in Maryland history, announced at a news conference his decision not to seek reelection in 2006. Colleagues of Sarbanes said that the reason for his retirement from the Senate was due to his annoyance with not having any leadership roles on committees.

Sarbanes received the Foreign Language Advocacy Award in 2007 from the Northeast Conference on the Teaching of Foreign Languages in recognition of his lifelong commitment to the values, languages, and cultures of the ancient world in service to the modern world.

== Personal life and death ==
In June 1960 Sarbanes married Christine Dunbar of Brighton, England; they had three children (John Sarbanes, Michael Anthony Sarbanes, and Janet Matina Sarbanes) and seven grandchildren. Christine Sarbanes died of cancer on March 22, 2009. Sarbanes held the highest lay office in the Greek Orthodox Church, "Order of St. Andrew, Archon of the Ecumenical Patriarchate" and was a member of the Greek Orthodox Cathedral of the Annunciation in Baltimore.

His son, John Sarbanes, won the general election for Maryland's 3rd congressional district in 2006, the district that Paul Sarbanes represented prior to his election as senator.

In 2008, construction began on the Paul S. Sarbanes Transit Center in downtown Silver Spring, Maryland. The transit center opened in 2015.

Paul Sarbanes died at his home in Baltimore on December 6, 2020, at the age of 87.

In April 2021 Wicomico Public Libraries announced that the library in downtown Salisbury would be renamed after Sarbanes.

== Election history ==
Year	Office sought	Election	Subject	Party	Votes	%	Opponent	Party	Votes	%
1970	Maryland's 4th congressional district	General	Paul Sarbanes	Democratic	93,093	69.7%	David Fentress	Republican	40,442	30.3%
1972	Maryland's 3rd congressional district	General	Paul Sarbanes	Democratic	93,218	83.8%	William Matthews	Republican	17,967	16.2%
1974	Maryland's 3rd congressional district	General	Paul Sarbanes	Democratic	54,936	70.1%	William H. Mathews	Republican	23,491	29.9%
1976	U.S. Senator, Class 1	General	Paul Sarbanes	Democratic	772,101	59.3%	John Glenn Beall, Jr. (incumbent)	Republican	530,439	40.7%
1982	U.S. Senator, Class 1	General	Paul Sarbanes	Democratic	707,356	63.5%	Lawrence Hogan	Republican	407,334	36.5%
1988	U.S. Senator, Class 1	General	Paul Sarbanes	Democratic	999,166	61.8%	Alan Keyes	Republican	617,537	38.2%
1994	U.S. Senator, Class 1	General	Paul Sarbanes	Democratic	809,125	59.1%	Bill Brock	Republican	559,908	40.9%
2000	U.S. Senator, Class 1	General	Paul Sarbanes	Democratic	1,230,013	63.2%	Paul Rappaport	Republican	715,178	36.8%

== Publications ==
- "The premise of the U. S. Constitutional system", Perspectives on culture and society, vol. 1 (1988), 119–126

== Notes and references ==
U.S. House of Representatives
Preceded by George Hyde Fallon	Member of the U.S. House of Representatives from Maryland's 4th congressional district 1971–1973	Succeeded by Marjorie Holt
Preceded by Edward Garmatz	Member of the U.S. House of Representatives from Maryland's 3rd congressional district 1973–1977	Succeeded by Barbara Mikulski
Party political offices
Preceded by Joseph Tydings	Democratic nominee for U.S. Senator from Maryland (Class 1); 1976, 1982, 1988, 1994, 2000	Succeeded by Ben Cardin
Vacant Title last held by Ted Stevens; John Rhodes	Response to the State of the Union address 1982; Served alongside: Robert Byrd, Alan Cranston, Al Gore, Gary Hart, Bennett Johnston, Ted Kennedy, Tip O'Neill, Don Riegle, Jim Sasser	Succeeded by Les AuCoin, Joe Biden, Bill Bradley, Robert Byrd, Tom Daschle, Bill Hefner, Barbara B. Kennelly, George Miller, Tip O'Neill, Paul Tsongas, Tim Wirth
U.S. Senate
Preceded by John Glenn Beall Jr.	U.S. Senator (Class 1) from Maryland; 1977–2007; Served alongside: Charles Mathias, Barbara Mikulski	Succeeded by Ben Cardin
Preceded by Al D'Amato	Ranking Member of the Senate Banking Committee; 1995–2001	Succeeded by Phil Gramm
Preceded by Phil Gramm	Chair of the Senate Banking Committee; 2001–2003	Succeeded by Richard Shelby
Preceded by Phil Gramm	Ranking Member of the Senate Banking Committee; 2003–2007	Succeeded by Richard Shelby
