= St. Paul's College, Washington, D.C. =

Coordinates: 38°55.68′N 76°59.93′W

St. Paul's College
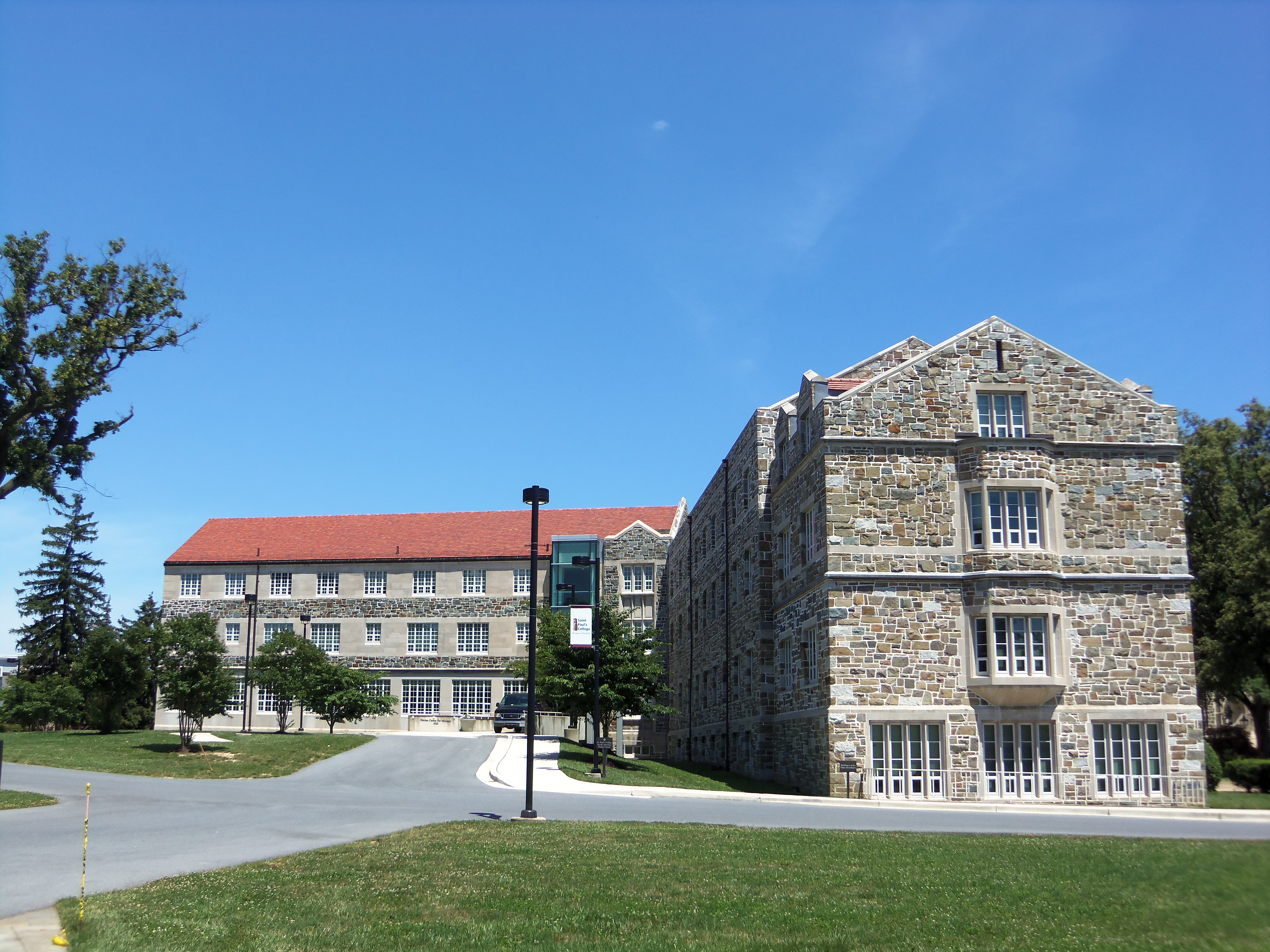
- Washington, D.C. United States

Information
- Type: Catholic Seminary
- Established: 1914; 112 years ago
- Rector: Father Paul D. Huesing, CSP
- Website: St. Paul's College

St. Paul's College in Washington, D.C. was the house of formation for the Paulist Fathers, founded by Isaac Hecker. As the home of Paulists who served the local and national Catholic Church through a variety of apostolates including education, evangelization, ecumenism, and mass communications, the college was an associate member of the Washington Theological Consortium.

== History ==
Established in 1914 within the boundaries of D.C.'s Edgewood neighborhood, St. Paul's College is the house of studies for Paulist seminarians. The Paulist Fathers maintain their formation program at St. Paul's College and seminarians attend the Catholic University of America for their graduate studies in theology. Prior to 2012, seminarians could choose between the Catholic University of America and Washington Theological Union for graduate study, but the latter institution closed that year due to lack of financial resources.

The present building was expanded through additions between 1942 and 1955, and a new library wing was dedicated in honor of Msgr. John J. Burke, CSP on January 15, 1958. Renovations of the original wing and the 1958 wing were completed in 1987. Other wings were renovated by February 2007, and parts of the college were designated as the North American Paulist Center and the Hecker Center for Ministry.

=== Closure ===
In March 2016, it was announced that the college's buildings had been sold to real estate developer Boundary Companies. Though the development proposal was still very much in the preliminary planning phase, the Paulists were expected to relocate to a smaller building on the same site. They later moved into St. Joseph's Seminary with the Josephites, and relocated to the new Hecker House near the former property in fall 2022.

== Recognition ==
The campus was listed on the National Register of Historic Places in 2018.
