= Graduate School USA =

Private school offering training programs

Coordinates: 38.88653°N 77.02030°W

- Type: Private school
- Established: 1921
- President: Steve Somers
- Location: Washington, D.C., United States
- Website: www.graduateschool.edu

Graduate School USA (formerly the Graduate School, USDA) is a private school headquartered in Washington, D.C., with regional campuses around the United States. It offers only training programs; it does not offer academic degree programs or for-credit courses. It was purchased by American Public Education, Inc. in 2021.

Its stated mission is to "develop people and to make government more efficient and effective by offering a wide variety of classes and programs, ranging from government-based specialties such as governmental accounting and auditing, human capital management and acquisition to foreign languages, economics, leadership and landscape design." It has approximately 200,000 participants per year with over 600 courses, including 300 evening and weekend courses. The school is accredited by the Accrediting Council for Continuing Education and Training.

== History ==
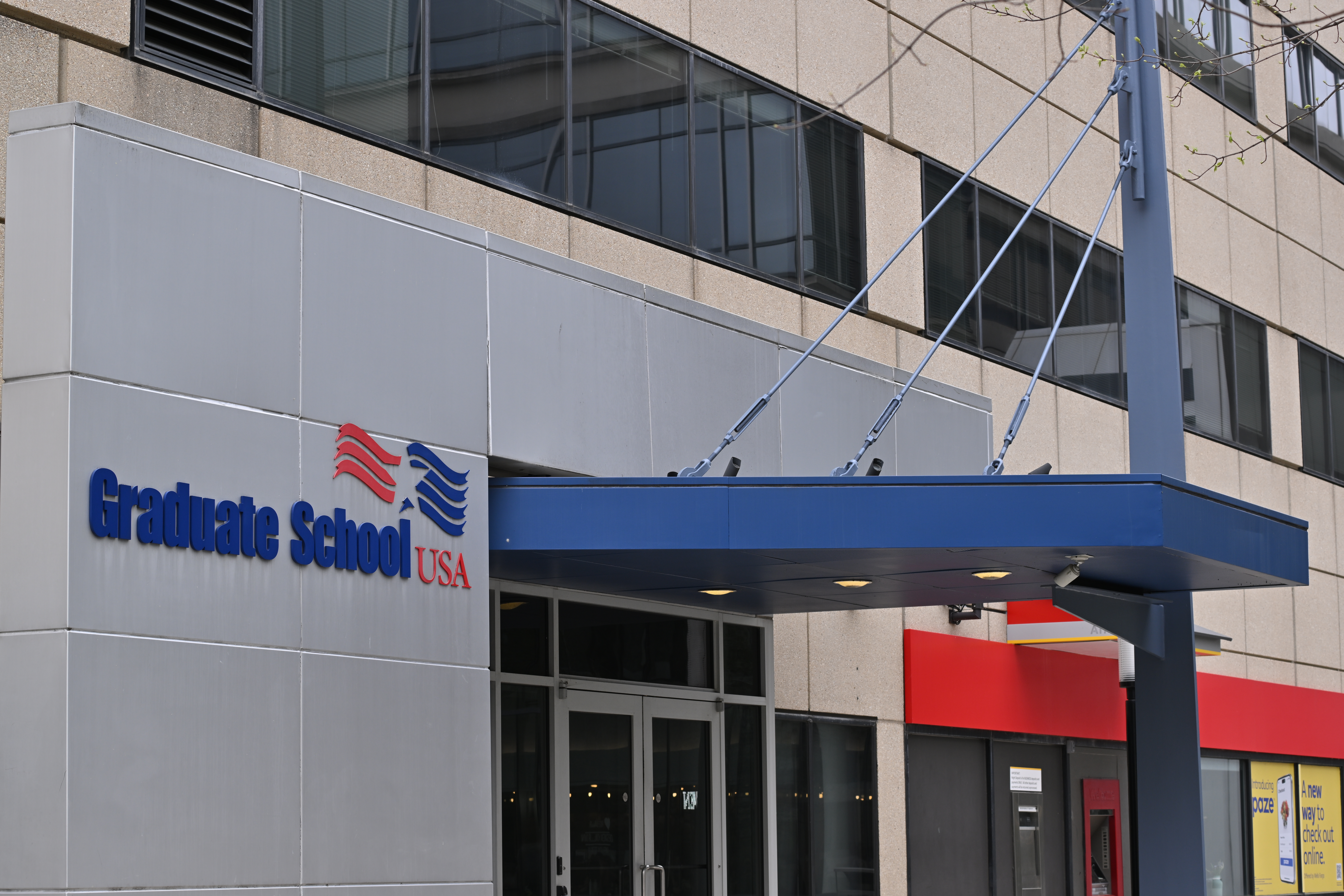
Graduate School USA sign and entrance, Washington, DC

The Graduate School was created in 1921 by the U.S. Department of Agriculture to provide adult continuing education. The Graduate School remained a part of the USDA as a Nonappropriated Fund Instrumentality (NAFI) until February 2009. At that time the school severed ties with the Department of Agriculture and became a private, nonprofit institution. Following the privatization, the school announced it would seek accreditation that would allow it to award bachelor's and master's degrees.

Nearby Southeastern University began seeking proposals for a merger in summer 2008. Southeastern was facing financial difficulties and a possible loss of accreditation. In March 2009, Southeastern announced that it would be purchased by Graduate School USA. Southeastern asked the Middle States Commission on Higher Education to delay any adverse action on accreditation pending the merger with Graduate School USA. The request was denied, and Southeastern was stripped of its accreditation for a number of administrative failures, including a lack of strategic planning, financial resources, and data systems. There was a delay in the purchase until Southeastern made a final agreement with Federal officials for fines the university had incurred. The asset purchase was completed in March 2010.

In March 2011, Graduate School USA announced plans to open a new campus in a planned redevelopment of Washington D.C.'s Southwest waterfront. Plans called for the school to be a major anchor in the redevelopment known as The Wharf, with the school leasing 190,000 square feet (18,000 m^{2}) of space at the corner of Maine Avenue and Ninth Street SW for its new campus. In October 2013, the school announced it would pull out of the new campus project "due to government cutbacks and budget uncertainty."

The institution was purchased by American Public Education, Inc., the owner of the American Public University System and other for-profit educational institutions, in 2021. The purchase was completed in early 2022.

== Programs and divisions ==
=== Center for Leadership and Management ===
The Center for Leadership and Management conducts leadership and management courses, long term leadership programs, and leadership effectiveness assessments. Most leadership development programs are geared specifically toward federal government leaders.

- Aspiring Leader Program, for federal employees at the GS 4-6 levels
- New Leader Program, a six-month development program for federal employees at GS 7-11 levels
- Executive Leadership Program, a nine-month development program for high-performing federal employees at the GS 11-13 levels
- Executive Potential Program, a year-long development program for senior-level public service employees at the GS 13-15 levels
- SES Development Seminars, a series of seminars designed to prepare GS-14 and GS-15 level federal employees for positions in the Senior Executive Service

=== The International Institute ===
The International Institute, as "the global arm of the Graduate School," administers grant programs on behalf of the International Visitor Leadership Program of the U.S. Department of State, the Open World program of the Library of Congress, the Pacific Islands Training Initiative and the Virgin Islands Training Initiative of the U.S. Department of the Interior, the Africa Growth and Opportunity Act (AGOA), and USAID staff development.

== See also ==
- List of colleges and universities in Washington, D.C.
