= Southeastern University (Washington, D.C.) =

Defunct American university

- Type: Private
- Active: 1879–2009
- Location: 501 I Street SW, Washington, D.C., U.S. 38°52′46.7″N 77°1′10.2″W
- Campus: Urban
- Degrees offered: Associate, Bachelor, Masters
- Colors: Burgundy, Gold
- Mascot: Hawk
- Website: seu.edu (archive) southeastern.edu (archive)

Southeastern University was a private, non-profit undergraduate and graduate institution of higher education located in southwestern Washington, D.C. The university lost its accreditation from the Middle States Commission on Higher Education on August 31, 2009. The Commission reported that the college lacked rigor and was losing faculty, enrollment, and financial stability. The 130-year-old school ceased offering classes after an extended summer session in 2009.

Southeastern University was established by YMCA and chartered by an Act of Congress in 1879. It had degree programs in Criminal Justice, Child Development, Public Administration, Business Management, Accounting, Finance, Liberal Studies, Computer Science, and Allied Health, a program initiated in 2006 at Greater Southeast Community Hospital. There were also certificate programs in entrepreneurship, property management, real estate, Web development, and others. It was a member of the Consortium of Universities of the Washington Metropolitan Area but lost this affiliation after the Fall 2009 semester.

Through the spring of 2009, Southeastern University had a total enrollment of about 870 students, with 222 of those students pursuing postgraduate degrees. About 77% were locally based, and a majority (60%) were female, but there was also a significant international enrollment. International enrollment had been in decline after the September 11, 2001 terrorist attacks, when the student population shifted from international students to primarily low-income District residents. The university employed approximately 140 faculty and staff before the university was notified of its loss of accreditation.

== History ==
Southeastern began as a series of classes offered by YMCA of the District of Columbia in 1879. The Washington School of Accountancy was added in 1907. In 1923, the university incorporated under the authority of the District of Columbia as "Southeastern University of YMCA of the District of Columbia". An August 19, 1937 federal charter from Congress renamed the institution "Southeastern University". The university afterward added other colleges. In 1977, the university received accreditation from the Middle States Commission on Higher Education. During the 1980s, two university officials were fired due to misappropriation of funds, and SEU's student loan default rate reached 42% by 1987. In 1989, the federal government temporarily cut off the university's loan funds. Enrollment declined from 1800 to 500 in the early 1990s.

== Closure ==
Three months before the university was notified it would lose accreditation, Southeastern received $1.5 million from the District of Columbia to fund improvements intended to prevent the school's loss of accreditation. Efforts by the D.C. government to recover the funding after the school lost accreditation were unsuccessful.

Elaine Ryan replaced Charlene Drew Jarvis as university president on March 31, 2009, after Jarvis had been president for 13 years. Prior to losing accreditation, the university was negotiating a merger with Graduate School USA (formerly Graduate School, USDA), also based in Washington, D.C.

In May 2014, the Shakespeare Theatre Company announced plans to redevelop the former site of Southeastern University at 501 Eye Street SW into an actors' campus. These plans fell through. The campus building was demolished and the space became a vacant lot.

== Notable alumni ==
- Tolulope Akande-Sadipe (born 1966), Nigerian Congresswoman
- Mohammed Barkindo (1959–2022), Secretary General of OPEC
- William Ralph Basham (born 1943), Commissioner of U.S. Customs and Border Protection, Director of U.S. Secret Service
- William C. Bilo (born 1944), United States Army Brigadier General, deputy director of the Army National Guard
- Howard Carwile (1911–1987), Virginia attorney and politician
- Gülden Ilkman (born 1970), Chief of Staff - Turkish Republic of Northern Cyprus
- Apirat Kongsompong (born 1960), Commander in Chief of the Royal Thai Army
- Hervey Gilbert Machen (1916–1994), Maryland Congressman
- Faisal Shahzad (born 1979), terrorist convicted of the 2010 Times Square car bomb attempt
