= 2010 Maryland elections =

Elections were held in Maryland on Tuesday, November 2, 2010. Primary elections were held on September 14, 2010.

== Federal ==
=== United States Senate ===
Incumbent Democratic Senator Barbara Mikulski ran for re-election against Republican Eric Wargotz and many third-party and independent candidates. She previously won senate elections in 1986, 1992, 1998, and 2004 by margins of 21, 42, 41 and 31 percentage points, respectively. She won the Democratic primary with token opposition and defeated Republican Eric Wargotz 62%-38%. With her victory and service to the end of her term in January 2017, Mikulski tied Paul Sarbanes as the longest-serving senator in state history, and also becoming the longest-serving female senator in history.

=== United States House ===
All eight of Maryland's seats in the United States House of Representatives were up for election in 2010. As of 2021, this is the last time that Republicans won more than one congressional district in Maryland.

=== By district ===
Results of the 2010 United States House of Representatives elections in Maryland by district:

District	Democratic		Republican		Others		Total		Result
District	Votes	%	Votes	%	Votes	%	Votes	%	Result
District 1	120,400	41.98%	155,118	54.08%	11,294	3.94%	286,812	100.0%	Republican gain
District 2	134,133	64.21%	69,523	33.28%	5,248	2.51%	208,904	100.0%	Democratic hold
District 3	147,448	61.07%	86,947	36.01%	7,034	2.91%	241,429	100.0%	Democratic hold
District 4	160,228	83.44%	31,467	16.39%	325	0.17%	192,020	100.0%	Democratic hold
District 5	155,110	64.26%	83,575	34.62%	2,698	1.12%	241,383	100.0%	Democratic hold
District 6	80,455	33.22%	148,820	61.45%	12,914	5.33%	242,189	100.0%	Republican hold
District 7	152,669	75.18%	46,375	22.84%	4,024	1.98%	203,068	100.0%	Democratic hold
District 8	153,613	73.27%	52,421	25.00%	3,633	1.73%	209,667	100.0%	Democratic hold
Total	1,104,056	60.48%	674,246	36.94%	47,170	2.58%	1,825,472	100.0%	

==== District 1 ====
Incumbent Democrat Frank Kratovil ran for re-election against state senator Andy Harris (politician) and Libertarian Richard Davis. Harris defeated Kratovil and Davis, 54%-42%-4%.

==== District 2 ====
Incumbent Democrat Dutch Ruppersberger ran for re-election against Republican Marcelo Cardarelli, a physician. He won 64%-33%.

==== District 3 ====
Incumbent Democrat John Sarbanes, son of former senator Paul Sarbanes, ran against Republican Jim Wilhelm. He defeated him, 61%-36%.

==== District 4 ====
Incumbent Democrat Donna Edwards ran for re-election against Republican Robert Broadus and won in a landslide, 83%-16%.

==== District 5 ====
Incumbent Democrat and House Majority Leader Steny Hoyer ran for re-election. He has represented this district since 1981. He was challenged by Republican Charles Lollar, the Chairman of the Charles County Republican Party. He won 64%-35%.

==== District 6 ====
Incumbent Republican Roscoe Bartlett ran for re-election against Democrat Andrew Duck. Bartlett was re-elected with 61% of the vote to Duck's 33%. This would be the last time a Republican would represent the 6th District, as well as the last time any Republican other than Andy Harris won a federal election in Maryland. Bartlett's district would be redrawn after the 2010 United States redistricting cycle. The composition of the district changed drastically, and he lost to John Delaney (Maryland politician).

==== District 7 ====
Incumbent Democrat Elijah Cummings ran for re-election, having represented the district since 1996. He defeated Republican Frank Mirabile 75%-23%.

==== District 8 ====
Incumbent Democrat Chris Van Hollen ran for re-election, having represented the district since 2003. He defeated Michael Lee Philips 73%-25%.

== State ==
=== Governor and Lieutenant Governor ===
Incumbent Democratic Governor Martin O'Malley ran for re-election against Republican challenger and former Governor Robert Ehrlich, as well as many third-party and independent candidates. Ehrlich had previously lost reelection to O'Malley in 2006. O'Malley defeated Ehrlich on election day, 56%-42%, a wider margin than his 53%-46% victory over incumbent Ehrlich. O'Malley and Brown became the first gubernatorial ticket in Maryland history to receive more than one million votes.

=== Comptroller ===
Democratic incumbent Peter Franchot ran for re-election against Republican challenger William Henry Campbell. Franchot defeated Campbell, 61%-39%.

=== Attorney General ===
Democratic incumbent Douglas Gansler ran unopposed for re-election. He received all but 1.82% of votes in the general election, to write-in candidates.

=== State Senate ===
All forty-seven seats of the Maryland Senate were up for election in 2010. Democrats entered the election with a 33-14 supermajority. They maintained this supermajority, winning an additional two seats.

=== State House of Delegates ===
All 141 seats in the Maryland House of Delegates were up for election in 2010. Democrats entered the election with a 104-37 supermajority. They lost six seats in the election.

=== Judicial positions ===
Multiple judicial positions were up for election in 2010.

- Maryland judicial elections, 2010 at Judgepedia

=== Ballot measures ===
Three measures were certified for the 2010 ballot.

- Maryland 2010 ballot measures at Ballotpedia

== Local ==
Many elections for county and city offices were also held on November 2, 2010.
