= 2010 United States Senate election in Maryland =

- November 2, 2010
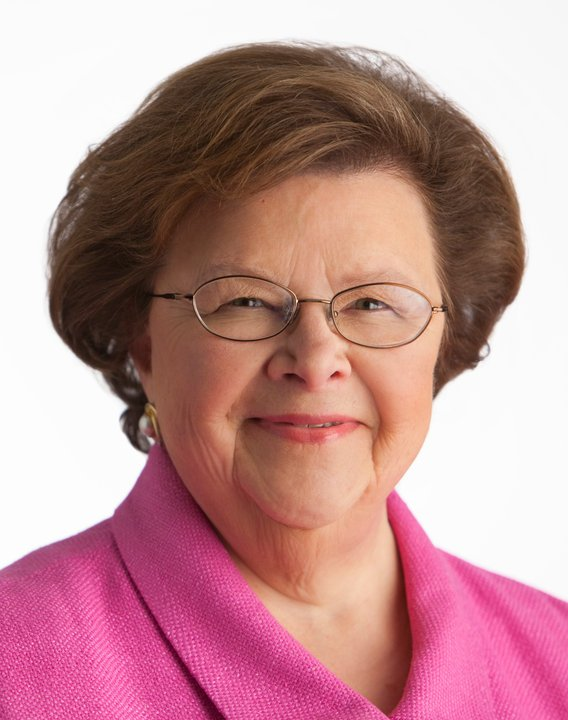

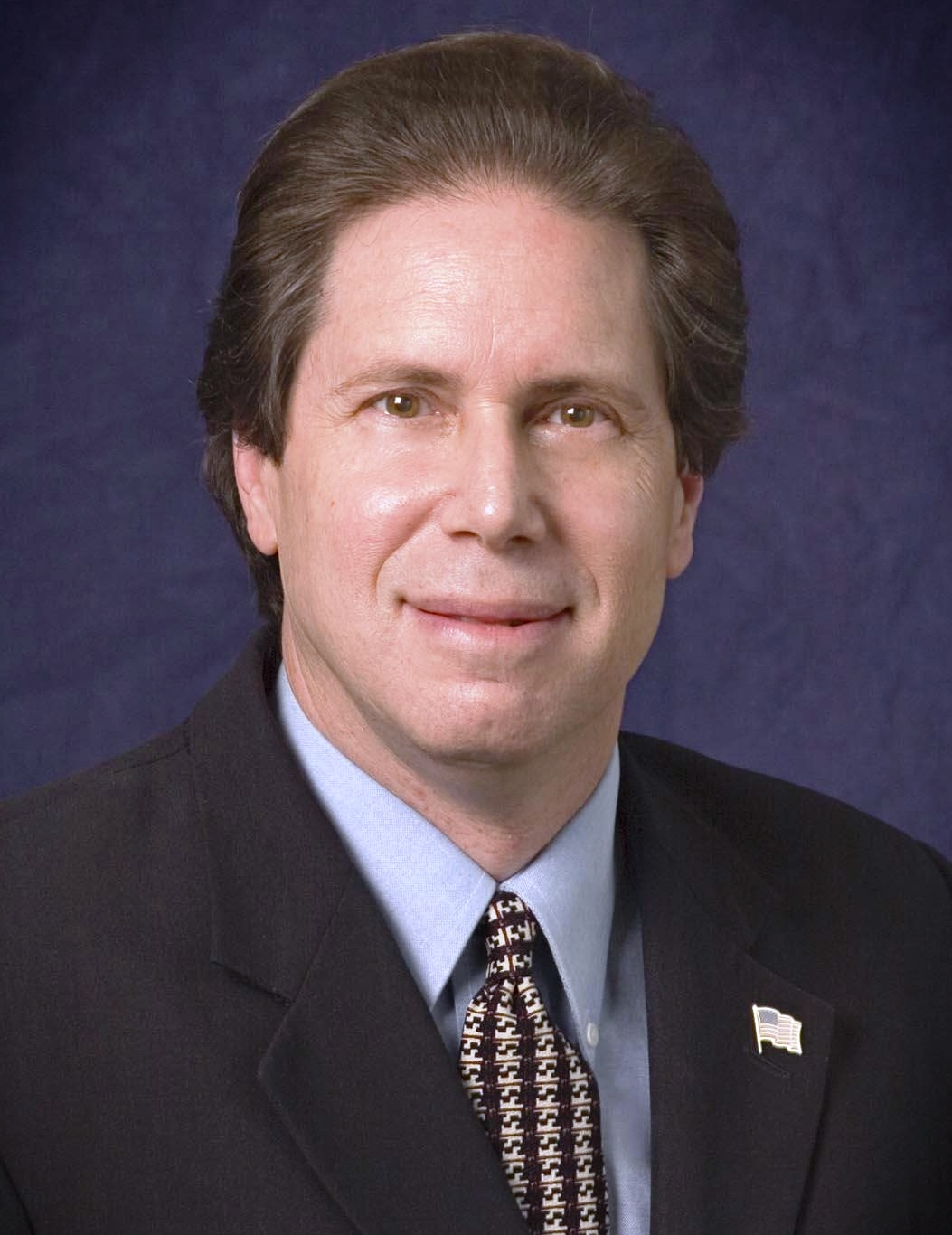
Nominee	Barbara Mikulski	Eric Wargotz
Party	Democratic	Republican
Popular vote	1,140,531	655,666
Percentage	62.19%	35.75%
- Mikulski: 40–50% 50–60% 60–70% 70–80% 80–90% >90% Wargotz: 40–50% 50–60% 60–70% 70–80% Tie: 40–50% 50%
U.S. senator before election
Barbara Mikulski
Democratic
Elected U.S. Senator
Barbara Mikulski
Democratic

The 2010 United States Senate election in Maryland was held on November 2, 2010. Primary elections were held on September 14, 2010. Incumbent Democratic U.S. Senator Barbara Mikulski won re-election to a fifth term.

According to The Baltimore Sun columnist David Nitkin, Mikulski had indicated she planned to seek re-election to a fifth term. If Mikulski were to win re-election and serve the full term, she would tie Paul Sarbanes as the longest-serving senator in state history, and also becoming the longest-serving female senator in history, turning 80 years old in the process. On February 15, 2010, rumors began to circulate that Mikulski would not seek reelection; however, these were denied by Democratic sources soon after.

She previously won senate elections in 1986, 1992, 1998, and 2004 by margins of 21, 42, 41 and 31 percentage points, respectively. Additionally, in the general election, state parties were expected to focus much of their attention on the seats of Governor Martin O'Malley and first-term Congressman Frank Kratovil, the latter of whom won a surprise victory in a conservative district of the state. Nitkin and Larry Sabato's Crystal Ball considered her seat as overwhelmingly "safe."

== Democratic primary ==
Results by county: Mikulski—80–90% Mikulski—70–80% Mikulski—60–70%

Democratic primary results
Party	Candidate	Votes	%
Democratic	Barbara Mikulski (Incumbent)	388,868	82.32%
Democratic	Christopher J. Garner	35,579	7.53%
Democratic	A. Billy Bob Jaworski	15,131	3.20%
Democratic	Blaine Taylor	10,787	2.28%
Democratic	Theresa C. Scaldaferri	7,913	1.68%
Democratic	Sanquetta Taylor	7,365	1.56%
Democratic	Lih Young	6,733	1.43%
Total votes		472,376	100.00%

== Republican primary ==
=== Nominee ===
- Eric Wargotz, Queen Anne's County Commission President

=== Eliminated in primary ===
- Joseph Alexander
- Barry Steve Asbury, newspaper publisher
- Neil Cohen, dentist
- Stephens Dempsey
- Samuel R. Graham Sr.
- John B. Kimble, perennial candidate
- Gregory Kump
- Daniel W. McAndrew
- Jim Rutledge, attorney
- Eddie Vendetti, engineer

=== Results ===
Results by county: Wargotz—60–70% Wargotz—50–60% Wargotz—40–50% Wargotz—<40% Rutledge—<40% Rutledge—40–50%

Republican primary results
Party	Candidate	Votes	%
Republican	Eric Wargotz	92,464	38.57%
Republican	Jim Rutledge	73,311	30.58%
Republican	Joseph Alexander	14,026	5.85%
Republican	Neil H. Cohen	13,613	5.68%
Republican	Stephens Dempsey	9,325	3.89%
Republican	Daniel W. McAndrew	8,460	3.53%
Republican	John B. Kimble	8,081	3.37%
Republican	Samuel R. Graham, Sr.	6,600	2.75%
Republican	Barry Steve Asbury	5,900	2.46%
Republican	Eddie Vendetti	5,046	2.10%
Republican	Gregory Kump	2,931	1.22%
Total votes		239,757	100.00%

== General election ==
=== Candidates ===
==== Major ====
- Barbara Mikulski (D), incumbent U.S. Senator
- Eric Wargotz (R), Queen Anne's County, Maryland Commission President (elected) and physician

==== Minor ====
- Don Kaplan (Independent)
- Richard Shawver (Constitution)
- Kenniss Henry (Green)
- Natasha Pettigrew (deceased) was the Green Party candidate. On September 19, while cycling, Pettigrew was hit by an SUV driver. Her mother, Kenniss Henry, was chosen by the Green Party to replace Pettigrew on the ballot.

=== Campaign ===
Wargotz released two television ads, in the first he created and introduced the term "insidersaurus": comparing Mikulski to a dinosaur by calling her a political "insidersaurus" being in Washington for over thirty years (a long-term political incumbent.) A second ad showed a hammer hitting a brick wall, breaking it down and citing criticisms of Mikulski's record as a U.S. Senator. Mikulski released advertisements emphasizing education and job creation.

Despite Wargotz's limited campaign and resources he received the highest percentage of votes against Mikulski as an incumbent U.S. Senator (over 20 years.)

=== Debates ===
Despite repeated requests by the Wargotz Campaign formal debate was declined by the incumbent U.S. Senator Mikulski. The two candidates did appear together on Maryland Public Television (MPT) fielding common questions posed to both by the moderator but no formal debate was held.

=== Predictions ===
Source	Ranking	As of
Cook Political Report	Solid D	October 26, 2010
Rothenberg	Safe D	October 22, 2010
RealClearPolitics	Safe D	October 26, 2010
Sabato's Crystal Ball	Safe D	October 21, 2010
CQ Politics	Safe D	October 26, 2010

=== Polling ===
Poll source	Date(s) administered	Sample size	Margin of error	Barbara Mikulski (D)	Eric Wargotz (R)	Other	Undecided
Rasmussen Reports (report)	July 8, 2010	500	± 4.5%	58%	33%	2%	7%
Public Policy Polling (report)	July 10–12, 2010	569	± 4.1%	59%	27%	––	14%
Rasmussen Reports (report)	August 20, 2010	750	± 4.0%	55%	39%	3%	3%
Rasmussen Reports (report)	September 15, 2010	750	± 4.0%	54%	38%	4%	4%
Gonzales Research & Marketing Strategies, Inc. (report)	October 11–16, 2010	816	± 3.5%	55%	38%	––	7%
Baltimore Sun/OpinionWorks (report)	October 15–20, 2010	798	± 3.5%	59%	32%	––	8%
Rasmussen Reports (report)	October 24, 2010	750	± 4.0%	56%	38%	2%	4%

=== Fundraising ===
Candidate (party)	Receipts	Disbursements	Cash on hand	Debt	Cash minus debt
Barbara Mikulski (D)	$3,690,724	$2,792,437	$1,772,774	$0	$1,772,774
Eric Wargotz (R)	$1,210,327	$743,392	$466,931	$459,600	$-7331.
Source: Federal Election Commission

=== Results ===

United States Senate election in Maryland, 2010
Party	Candidate	Votes	%	±%
Democratic	Barbara Mikulski (incumbent)	1,140,531	62.19%	−2.61%
Republican	Eric Wargotz	655,666	35.75%	+2.05%
Green	Kenniss Henry	20,717	1.13%	+0.06%
Constitution	Richard Shawver	14,746	0.80%	+0.42%
Write-in		2,213	0.11%	+0.05%
Total votes		1,833,873	100.0%	
Democratic hold				

==== By county ====
County	Barbara A. Mikulski Democratic		Eric Wargotz Republican		Kennis Henry Green		Richard Shawver Constitution		Other Other		Margin		Total Votes Cast
County	#	%	#	%	#	%	#	%	#	%	#	%	Total Votes Cast
Allegany	9639	44.60%	11350	52.52%	288	1.33%	319	1.48%	16	0.07%	-1711	-7.92%	21612
Anne Arundel	102511	51.17%	92994	46.42%	2766	1.38%	1868	0.93%	214	0.11%	9517	4.75%	200353
Baltimore (City)	138312	86.59%	18336	11.48%	2094	1.31%	831	0.52%	167	0.10%	119976	75.11%	159740
Baltimore (County)	165678	58.27%	112670	39.62%	3426	1.20%	2233	0.79%	343	0.12%	53008	18.64%	284350
Calvert	15247	48.44%	15569	49.46%	364	1.16%	275	0.87%	21	0.07%	-322	-1.02%	31476
Caroline	4508	45.46%	5142	51.86%	120	1.21%	127	1.28%	19	0.19%	-634	-6.39%	9916
Carroll	21632	34.38%	39312	62.48%	834	1.33%	1040	1.65%	101	0.16%	-17680	-28.10%	62919
Cecil	13132	44.22%	15600	52.53%	443	1.49%	485	1.63%	40	0.13%	-2468	-8.31%	29700
Charles	30106	64.88%	15598	33.62%	348	0.75%	321	0.69%	28	0.06%	14508	31.27%	46401
Dorchester	6481	55.96%	4910	42.39%	99	0.85%	87	0.75%	5	0.04%	1571	13.56%	11582
Frederick	34913	46.67%	38013	50.81%	876	1.17%	905	1.21%	107	0.14%	-3100	-4.14%	74814
Garrett	3361	35.76%	5750	61.17%	117	1.24%	164	1.74%	8	0.09%	-2389	-25.41%	9400
Harford	40712	43.50%	50513	53.98%	1082	1.16%	1171	1.25%	106	0.11%	-9801	-10.47%	93584
Howard	63738	59.71%	40853	38.27%	1239	1.16%	794	0.74%	125	0.12%	22885	21.44%	106749
Kent	4549	56.04%	3405	41.95%	81	1.00%	74	0.91%	8	0.10%	1144	14.09%	8117
Montgomery	204005	70.67%	79582	27.57%	3353	1.16%	1393	0.48%	351	0.12%	124423	43.10%	288684
Prince George's	204441	89.11%	22607	9.85%	1472	0.64%	752	0.33%	164	0.07%	181834	79.25%	229436
Queen Anne's	8575	43.64%	10561	53.75%	195	0.99%	284	1.45%	35	0.18%	-1986	-10.11%	19650
St. Mary's	14669	46.86%	15911	50.83%	320	1.02%	377	1.20%	26	0.08%	-1242	-3.97%	31303
Somerset	4082	53.98%	3363	44.47%	48	0.63%	67	0.89%	2	0.03%	719	9.51%	7562
Talbot	7968	49.28%	7946	49.15%	147	0.91%	95	0.59%	12	0.07%	22	0.14%	16168
Washington	17356	43.71%	20873	52.57%	579	1.46%	653	1.64%	247	0.62%	-3517	-8.86%	39708
Wicomico	14668	49.88%	14189	48.25%	243	0.83%	278	0.95%	30	0.10%	479	1.63%	29408
Worcester	10248	48.28%	10619	50.03%	183	0.86%	153	0.72%	23	0.11%	-371	-1.75%	21226
Total	1140531	62.19%	655666	35.75%	20717	1.13%	14746	0.80%	2198	0.12%	484865	26.44%	1833858

Counties that flipped from Democratic to Republican

- Allegany (largest municipality: Cumberland)
- Calvert (largest municipality: Chesapeake Beach)
- Caroline (largest municipality: Denton)
- Frederick (largest municipality: Frederick)
- St. Mary's (largest municipality: California)
- Worcester (largest municipality: Ocean Pines)

== See also ==
- 2010 United States Senate elections
- 2010 United States elections
