= EHHS =

EHHS may refer to

- Eagle Harbor High School
- East Hall High School
- East Hardy High School
- East Haven High School
- East Hollywood High School
- Eastern Hills High School
- Eastern Hancock High School
- Engineering Heritage Hallmark Scheme
