= West Valley City, Utah =

City in Utah, United States

- City
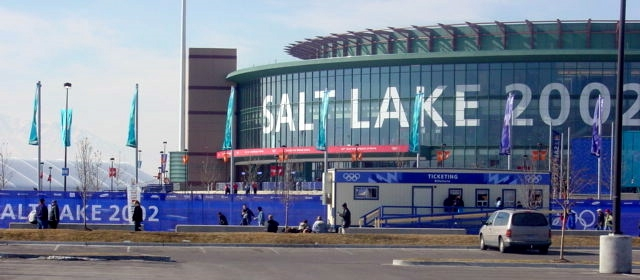
- The Maverik Center in West Valley City, home of the Salt Lake City Stars basketball team.

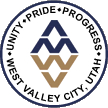
- Flag Seal
- Motto: "Progress as promised."
- Location within Salt Lake County

- Location within Utah Location within the United States
- Coordinates: 40°41′21″N 111°59′38″W
- Country: United States
- State: Utah
- County: Salt Lake
- Settled: 1847
- Incorporated: 1980

Government
  - Mayor: Karen Lang

Area
  - Total: 35.88 sq mi (92.92 km^{2})
  - Land: 35.83 sq mi (92.79 km^{2})
  - Water: 0.054 sq mi (0.14 km^{2})
- Elevation: 4,304 ft (1,312 m)

Population (2020)
  - Total: 140,230
  - Density: 3,913.76/sq mi (1,511.11/km^{2})
- Time zone: UTC−7 (Mountain (MST))
  - Summer (DST): UTC−6 (MDT)
- Area codes: 385, 801
- FIPS code: 49-83470
- GNIS feature ID: 1437843
- Website: www.wvc-ut.gov

West Valley City is a city in Salt Lake County and an inner suburb of Salt Lake City in the U.S. state of Utah. The population was 140,230 at the 2020 census, making it the second-most populous city in Utah after Salt Lake City. The city incorporated in 1980 from a large, quickly growing unincorporated area, combining the four communities of Granger, Hunter, Chesterfield, and Redwood. It is home to the Maverik Center and Utah First Credit Union Amphitheatre.

== History ==
The earliest known residents of the western Salt Lake Valley were Native American bands of the Ute and Shoshoni tribes.

The first European people to live in the area were the Latter-day Saints. The Euro-Americans arrived in the Salt Lake Valley in 1847. The area was first staked out by settler Joseph Harker and his family in the area they named as "over Jordan" (referring to the land west of the Jordan River, which runs through the valley).

The Granger area was settled by Welsh pioneers who came to Utah with Dan Jones in 1849. Irrigation systems and agriculture were developed in the area, and Elias Smith proposed the area's name on account of its successful farming. The population of Granger and its vicinity was about 1,000 people in 1930.

Hunter was not settled until 1876. This settlement was started by Rasmus Nielson, Edward Rushton, August Larsen and about seven others along with their families. Irrigation began in 1881 and the main crop was fruit trees.

The city began to experience rapid growth in the 1970s, when the area that is now West Valley City consisted of the four separate communities of Hunter, Granger, Chesterfield, and Redwood. These four unincorporated areas merged in 1980 to form the present-day city. During the 2002 Olympic Winter Games, West Valley City was the official venue for men's and women's ice hockey.

Plans to create a vibrant downtown district for the city were launched in 2011, including housing, commercial, and entertainment venues centered around Fairbourne Station (named after Joseph Fairbourne, an early settler who operated a weigh station in the area in the late 19th century), a civic center (consisting of city hall, a courthouse, police headquarters, and a library), hotels, a plaza, and public transport hub for the TRAX Green Line and the 3500 South MAX bus rapid transit line. Valley Fair Mall, West Valley Performing Arts Center, and the Maverik Center are located nearby, as is I-215.

Serial killer Ted Bundy was arrested in Granger on August 16, 1975, on a routine traffic stop.

== Geography ==
According to the United States Census Bureau, the city has a total area of 35.5 square miles (91.8 km^{2}), of which 35.4 square miles (91.7 km^{2}) is land and 0.1 square miles (0.2 km^{2}) (0.17%) is water.

West Valley is located on the northwest side of the Salt Lake Valley between Salt Lake City on the north, South Salt Lake on the east, Magna on the west, and Taylorsville and Kearns Township on the south. The Oquirrh Mountains loom over the city to the west, while the Jordan River marks the eastern boundary.

=== Neighborhoods ===
==== Chesterfield, Redwood, Westshire, East Granger (84119) ====
The Eastern side of West Valley City consists of the Redwood, Chesterfield and East Granger neighborhoods. The neighborhood population in 2013 was 54,832. This area of West Valley City has a median household income of $42,512, which is lower when compared to the rest of the city and region. The neighborhood's racial makeup was 51.17% White, 35.08% Hispanic or Latino, 4.73% Asian, 3.24% Native Hawaiian and Other Pacific Islander and 2.51% African-American.

Much of Eastern West Valley's residential architecture is based on common brick ranch styles from the 1960s and 1970s. To the north of Parkway Boulevard exists a significant number of light industrial development. South of Parkway is mostly residential and commercial, including Valley Fair Mall and the Maverik Center. The Westshire neighborhood is located directly south of Valley Fair Mall and consists of 160 homes built by modernist architect Ron Molen. This neighborhood is unique in that all homes were built in the 1960s and 1970s in the Mid-Century Modern style and are excellent examples of modernist residential architecture. West Valley City planners are currently developing a planned mass-transit anchored Downtown area near the Valley Fair Mall with the emergence of the Fairbourne Station as a gathering place and revitalization of the mall.

==== West Granger, Hunter, Lakepark (84120) ====
The Central portion of West Valley City consists of the West Granger and Hunter, south of 3100 South, with the Lakepark and Westlake Business Park commercial and office developments taking up the majority of the space north of 3100 South. The neighborhood population in 2013 was 49,107. This area of West Valley City has a median household income of $55,087, which is typical for the state of Utah and Northern Salt Lake County. The neighborhood's racial makeup was 53.82% White, 32.11% Hispanic or Latino, 5.04% Asian, 4.54% Native Hawaiian and Other Pacific Islander and 1.57% African-American.

Much of Central West Valley's residential architecture is based on common brick ranch styles from the 1960s and 1970s. The Highbury planned development is currently being established in the northwestern portion of this area. This is a large planned mixed residential and commercial area with a large pond and many casual restaurants in a walk-able district near 5600 West.

==== West Hunter, Woodhaven, Oquirrh (84128) ====
The western portion of West Valley City consists of the West Hunter, Woodhaven, and Oquirrh neighborhoods. The neighborhood population in 2013 was 28,475. This area of West Valley City has a median household income of $64,356, which is slightly higher than the median for both the state of Utah and Salt Lake County. The neighborhood's racial makeup was 60.65% White, 29.62% Hispanic or Latino, 3.15% Asian, 2.37% Native Hawaiian and Other Pacific Islander and 1.39% African-American.

Much of western West Valley's residential architecture is based on 1990s and 2000s planned developments. The majority of the neighborhood is residential, with the exception of many strip-mall style commercial developments along its eastern border of 5600 West. The city's master plan calls for a Hunter Town Center development near the intersection of 5600 West and 3500 South, but no structures have yet been developed specifically for this. This side of West Valley City is also home to USANA Amphitheater, though it technically shares the 84118 zip code with Kearns and Taylorsville, rather than West Valley City.

== Demographics ==
Historical population
Census	Pop.	Note	%±
1980	72,299		—
1990	86,976		20.3%
2000	108,896		25.2%
2010	129,480		18.9%
2020	140,230		8.3%

=== Racial and ethnic composition ===
West Valley City, Utah – Racial and ethnic composition Note: the US Census treats Hispanic/Latino as an ethnic category. This table excludes Latinos from the racial categories and assigns them to a separate category. Hispanics/Latinos may be of any race.
Race / Ethnicity (NH = Non-Hispanic)	Pop. 2000	Pop. 2010	Pop. 2020	% 2000	% 2010	% 2020
White alone (NH)	76,545	69,498	61,004	70.29%	53.67%	43.50%
Black or African American alone (NH)	1,090	2,254	3,720	1.00%	1.74%	2.65%
Native American or Alaska Native alone (NH)	1,014	1,137	1,231	0.93%	0.88%	0.88%
Asian alone (NH)	4,614	6,303	7,920	4.24%	4.87%	5.65%
Pacific Islander alone (NH)	3,118	4,647	6,334	2.86%	3.59%	4.52%
Other race alone (NH)	75	284	443	0.07%	0.22%	0.32%
Mixed race or Multiracial (NH)	2,314	2,465	4,300	2.12%	1.90%	3.07%
Hispanic or Latino (any race)	20,126	42,892	55,278	18.48%	33.13%	39.42%
Total	108,896	129,480	140,230	100.00%	100.00%	100.00%

=== 2020 census ===
As of the 2020 census, West Valley City had a population of 140,230. The median age was 31.3 years. 29.4% of residents were under the age of 18 and 9.5% of residents were 65 years of age or older. For every 100 females there were 102.0 males, and for every 100 females age 18 and over there were 100.9 males age 18 and over.

100.0% of residents lived in urban areas, while 0.0% lived in rural areas.

There were 40,774 households in West Valley City, of which 45.1% had children under the age of 18 living in them. Of all households, 52.6% were married-couple households, 17.2% were households with a male householder and no spouse or partner present, and 22.5% were households with a female householder and no spouse or partner present. About 16.4% of all households were made up of individuals and 5.7% had someone living alone who was 65 years of age or older.

There were 42,001 housing units, of which 2.9% were vacant. The homeowner vacancy rate was 0.8% and the rental vacancy rate was 4.3%.

Racial composition as of the 2020 census
Race	Number	Percent
White	69,400	49.5%
Black or African American	3,915	2.8%
American Indian and Alaska Native	2,596	1.9%
Asian	8,031	5.7%
Native Hawaiian and Other Pacific Islander	6,454	4.6%
Some other race	31,493	22.5%
Two or more races	18,341	13.1%
Hispanic or Latino (of any race)	55,278	39.4%

=== 2010 census ===
As of the 2010 census, there were 129,480 people, 38,535 households, and 34,900 families residing in the city. The population density was 3,647.32 people per square mile (2,266.35/km^{2}). There were 38,978 housing units at an average density of 1,097.97 per square mile (682.25/km^{2}).

The racial makeup of the city was 65.37% White, 1.96% African American, 1.26% Native American, 4.97% Asian, 3.64% Pacific Islander, 18.96% from other races, and 3.85% from two or more races. Hispanic or Latino of any race were 33.13% of the population.

There were 38,535 households, out of which 47.1% had children under the age of 18 living with them, 61.3% were married couples living together, 13.2% had a female householder with no husband present, and 19.6% were non-families. 14.7% of all households were made up of individuals, and 3.9% had someone living alone who was 65 years of age or older. The average household size was 3.36 and the average family size was 3.71.

In the city, the population was spread out, with 33.7% under the age of 18, 12.9% from 18 to 24, 30.7% from 25 to 44, 17.4% from 45 to 64, and 5.4% who were 65 years of age or older. The median age was 27 years. For every 100 females, there were 102.3 males. For every 100 females age 18 and over, there were 100.5 males.

The median income for a household in the city was $45,773, and the median income for a family was $48,593. Males had a median income of $32,116 versus $22,693 for females. The per capita income for the city was $15,031. About 6.7% of families and 8.7% of the population were below the poverty line, including 11.0% of those under age 18 and 3.5% of those age 65 or over.

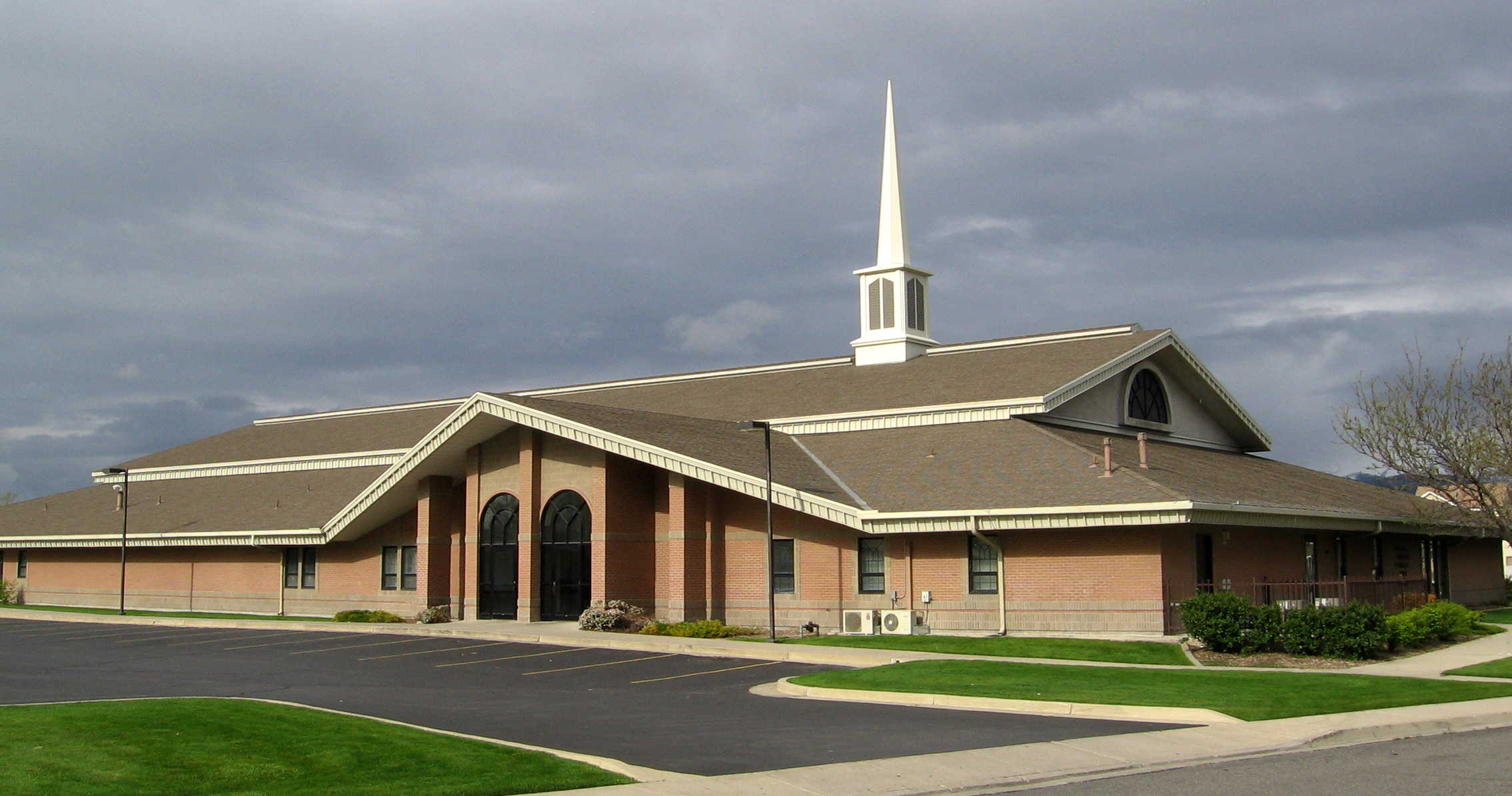
A stake center of the Church of Jesus Christ of Latter-day Saints in West Valley, Utah.

== Economy ==
Companies based in West Valley City include Backcountry.com, Black Rifle Coffee Company, C.R. England, FranklinCovey, and USANA Health Sciences.

=== Top employers ===
According to the City's 2017 Comprehensive Annual Financial Report, these are the top employers in the city:

#	Employer	# of Employees
1	Discover Financial	4,200
2	United Parcel Service	1,320
3	Swift Transportation	1,118
4	Select Portfolio Servicing	987
5	Hexcel	953
6	Verizon Wireless	916
7	West Valley City	909
8	Sutter Health	804
9	USANA Health Sciences	778
10	Walmart	629
11	Jacobsen Construction	616
12	Pride Transport	606
13	Six Continents	587
14	C.R. England	544
15	Wheeler CAT	520
16	ATK Launch Systems	452
17	Old Dominion Freight Line	441
18	Jordan Valley Medical	418
19	Zions Bank Commercial	414
20	Freightliner of Utah	402
21	Hunt Electric	397
22	Federal Express	396
23	Zions Bank Data	366
24	YRC Worldwide	360
25	ADP	338

== Parks and recreation ==
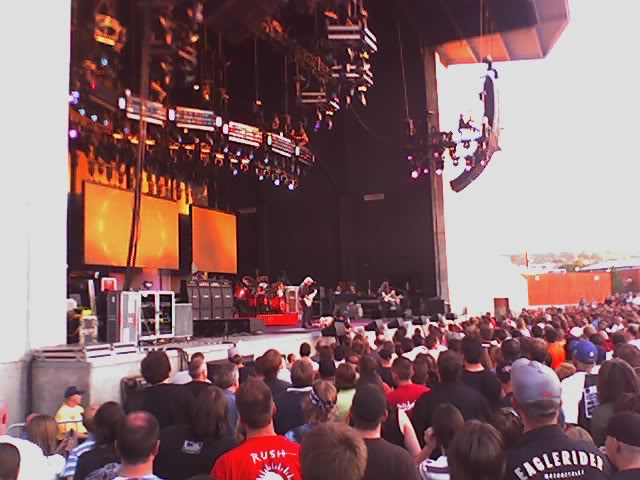
Rush playing at the USANA Amphitheatre in 2007.

West Valley City is home to the Maverik Center and the Salt Lake City Stars of the NBA G League. It is also home to the Utah Cultural Celebration Center, Stonebridge Golf Course, The Ridge Golf Course, Rocky Mountain Raceways, USANA Amphitheatre, and the Valley Fair Mall. West Valley City is also home to The Drive-in.

== Government ==
The mayor and six councilors are elected to four-year terms. Mayoral elections are held the same year as three of the councilors. The other three councilors are staggered two years from the mayoral. Two council seats are at-large, or citywide, and the remaining four seats represent districts of approximately 28,000 residents. Officials are not subject to term limits.

In the Utah State Legislature, West Valley City is situated within Senate Districts 10, 11, and 12, represented by Luz Escamilla (Democrat), Daniel Thatcher (Forward Party), and Karen Kwan (Democrat); and House Districts 25, 26, 27, 30, and 31, represented by Angela Romero (Democrat), Matt MacPherson (Republican), Anthony Loubet (Republican), Jake Fitisemanu (Democrat), and Verona Mauga (Democrat). Federally, West Valley City lies in the 2nd and 4th congressional districts, represented by Republicans Chris Stewart and Burgess Owens.

West Valley City has a nonpartisan, strong city manager form of government, which means that the city manager is analogous to a corporation's CEO, while the mayor fills a role similar to chairman of the board, with the City Council acting as the "board". The mayor is a voting member of the City Council.

== Education ==
The city lies in the Granite School District. It has 21 elementary schools, four junior high schools, and two high schools — Granger Senior High, which opened in 1958, and Hunter, which opened in 1990. The city also contains multiple charter schools: East Hollywood High School, a charter school specializing in film education; American Preparatory Academy; and Monticello Academy.

== Infrastructure ==
=== Transportation ===
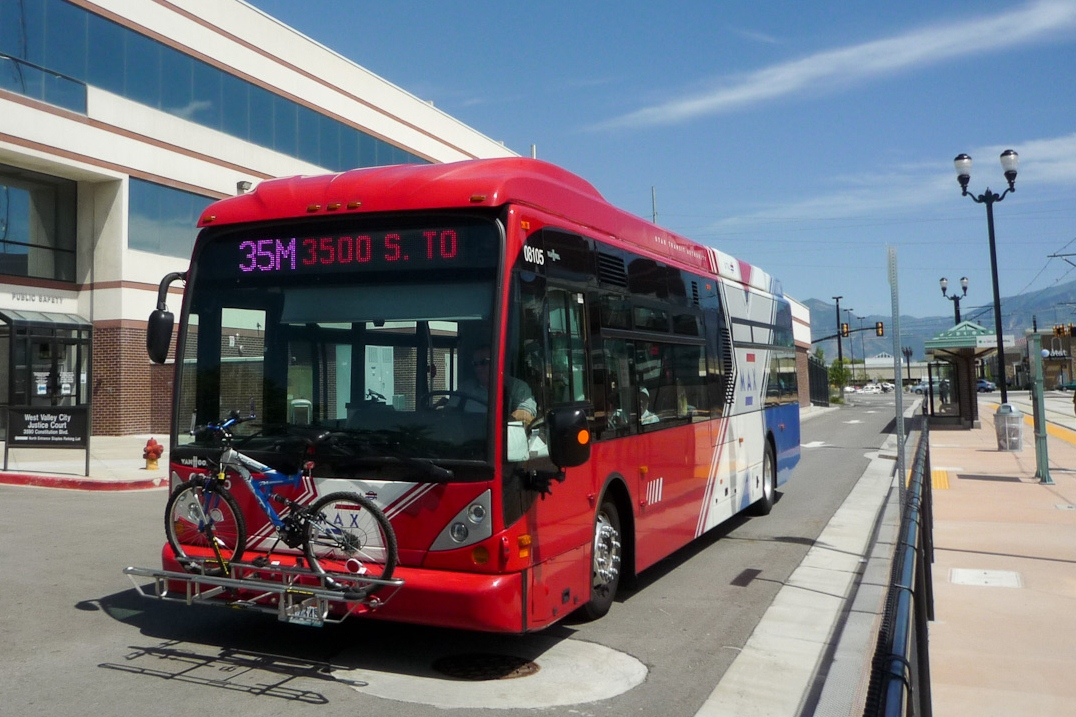
The West Valley Central Green Line station.

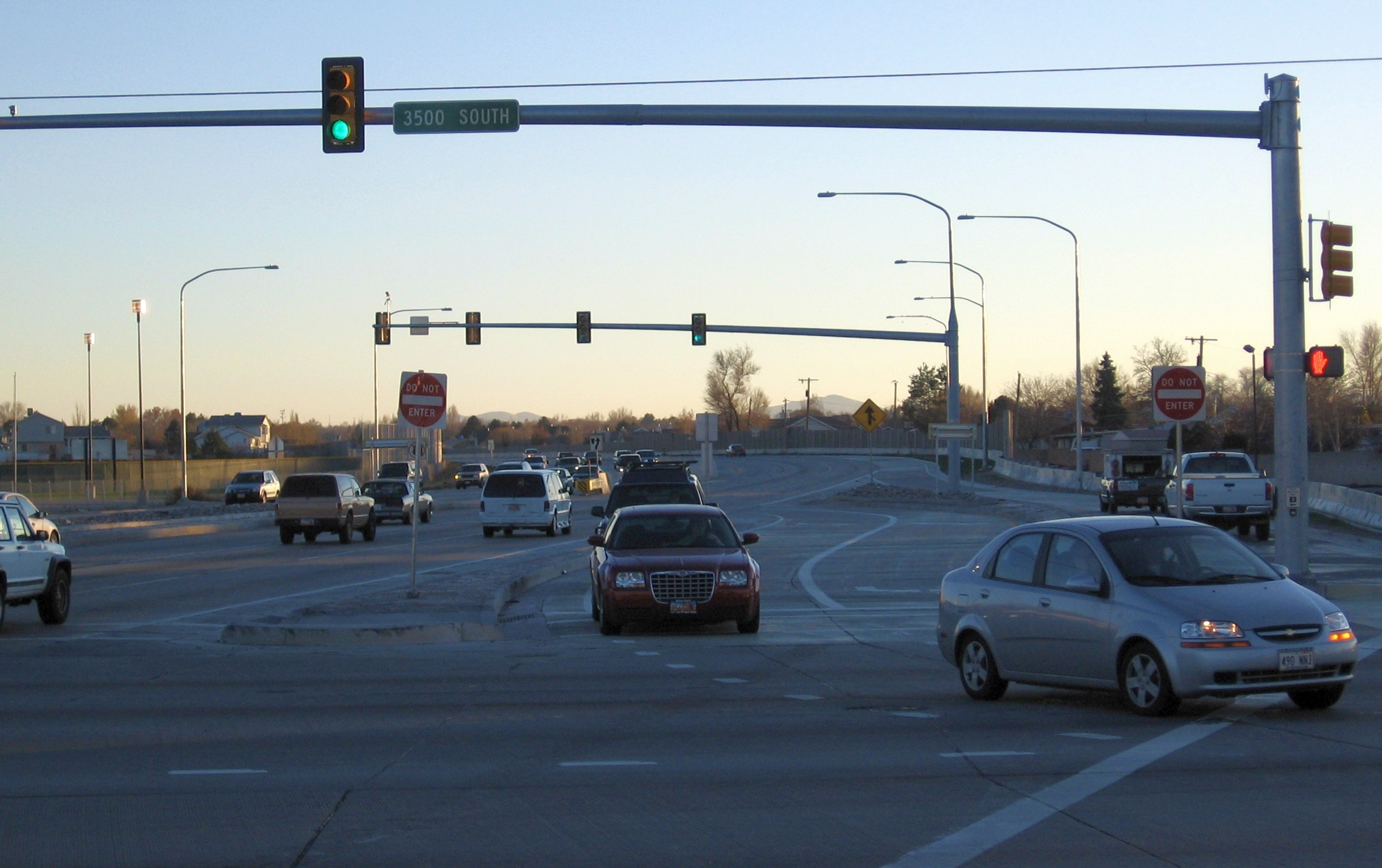
A continuous-flow intersection on the Bangerter Highway in West Valley City.

Highways:

- I-215
- SR-201
- Bangerter Highway
- Mountain View Corridor

Transit:

- Utah Transit Authority. An intermodal transportation hub is located in the city.
- West Valley Central station is served by the TRAX light rail's Green Line
- The Midvalley Express bus rapid transit serves West Valley Central in addition to stops along 2700 West (Constitution Boulevard) before entering Taylorsville en route to Murray Central station

=== Police ===
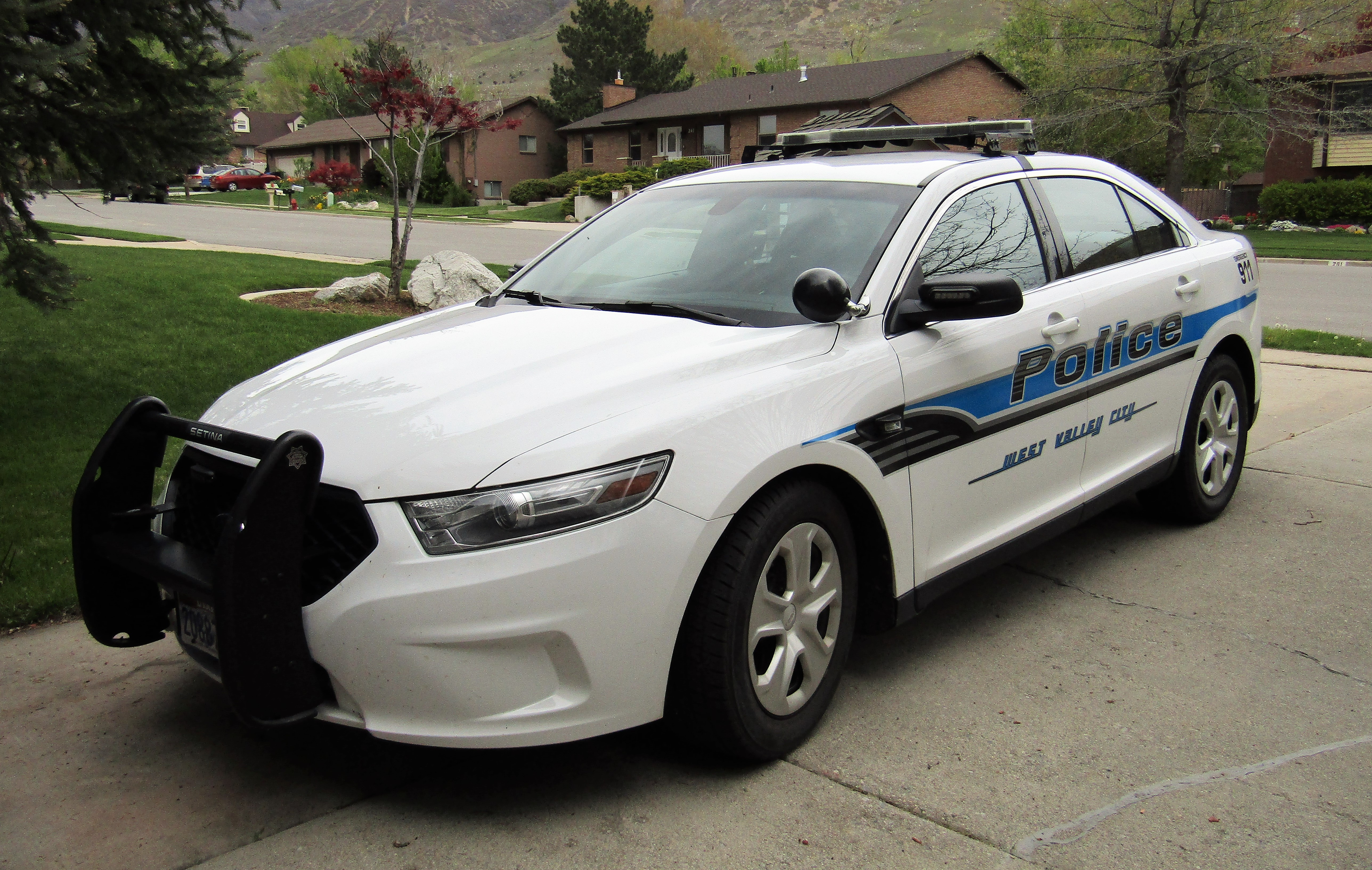
West Valley City police car

The West Valley City Police Department provides law enforcement services to the city. There are 218 sworn officers and 47 support staff.

== Notable people ==
- Ray Feinga, professional football player; NFL offensive tackle
- Tadd Gadduang, finalist, So You Think You Can Dance
- Zavier Gozo, soccer player
- Naufahu Tahi, professional football player; NFL fullback, Minnesota Vikings
- Khyiris Tonga, professional football player; nose tackle for the Atlanta Falcons

== See also ==
- Salt Lake City metropolitan area
- Granger-Hunter, a census-designated place delineated within the area in 1970.
