= Barbara Mikulski =

American politician (born 1936)

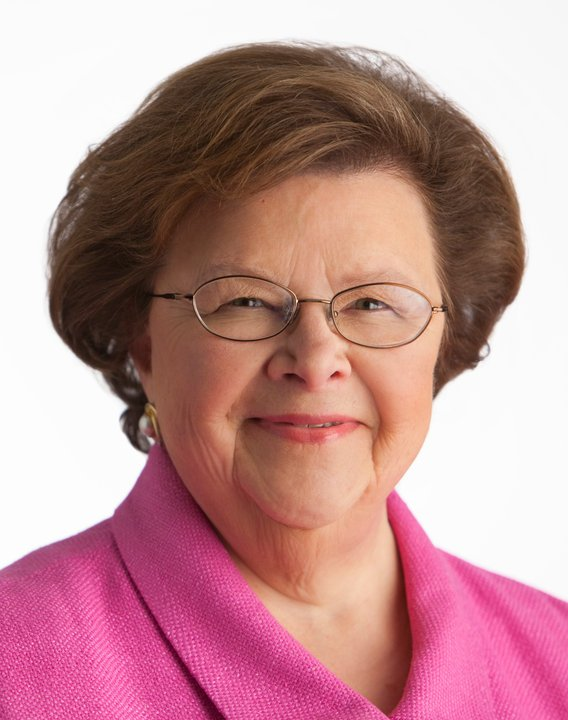
- Official portrait, 2011

United States Senator from Maryland
- In office January 3, 1987 – January 3, 2017
- Preceded by: Charles Mathias
- Succeeded by: Chris Van Hollen
Senate positions
Chair of the Senate Appropriations Committee
In office December 17, 2012 – January 3, 2015
Preceded by	Dan Inouye
Succeeded by	Thad Cochran

Member of the U.S. House of Representatives from Maryland's 3rd district
- In office January 3, 1977 – January 3, 1987
- Preceded by: Paul Sarbanes
- Succeeded by: Ben Cardin

Personal details
- Born: Barbara Ann Mikulski; July 20, 1936 (age 90) Baltimore, Maryland, U.S.
- Party: Democratic
- Education: Mount Saint Agnes College (BA); University of Maryland, Baltimore (MSW)
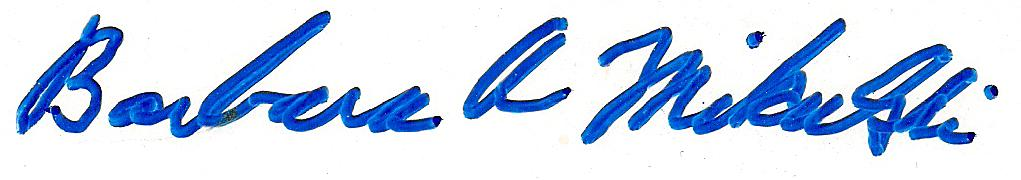
- Signature
- Mikulski's voice Mikulski reflecting on her legislative career upon becoming the longest-serving woman in Congress. Recorded March 21, 2012

Barbara Ann Mikulski (/mɪˈkʌlski/ mih-KUL-skee; born July 20, 1936) is an American politician and social worker who served as a United States senator from Maryland from 1987 to 2017. A member of the Democratic Party, she also served in the United States House of Representatives from 1977 to 1987. Mikulski is the third-longest-serving female United States senator, and the longest-serving U.S. senator in Maryland history. (Note: Mikulski and Paul Sarbanes each served five terms (30 years) in the Senate. However, due to a differing number of leap days over their respective tenures, Sarbanes finished with 10,957 days of Senate service to Mikulski's 10,958 days.)

Born and raised in the Highlandtown neighborhood of East Baltimore, Mikulski attended Mount Saint Agnes College and the University of Maryland School of Social Work. Originally a social worker and community organizer, she was elected to the Baltimore City Council in 1971 after delivering a highly publicized address on the "ethnic movement" in America. She was elected to the House of Representatives in 1976, and in 1986, she became the first woman elected to the United States Senate from Maryland.

From the death of Senator Daniel Inouye in December 2012 until 2015, Mikulski chaired the Senate Appropriations Committee. She was the first woman and first Marylander to hold the position. At her retirement, she was the ranking minority member of the committee. She also served on the Health, Education, Labor, and Pensions Committee and the Select Committee on Intelligence.

On March 2, 2015, Mikulski announced that she would retire after five terms in the Senate and would not seek reelection in 2016. In January 2017, Mikulski joined Johns Hopkins University as a professor of public policy and advisor to University President Ronald J. Daniels.

== Early life, education, and career ==
Mikulski was born and raised in the Highlandtown neighborhood of East Baltimore, the eldest of the three daughters of Christine Eleanor (née Kutz) and William Mikulski. Her parents were both of Polish descent; her immigrant great-grandparents had owned a bakery in Baltimore. During her high school years at the Institute of Notre Dame, she worked in her parents' grocery store, delivering groceries to elderly neighbors who were unable to leave their homes.

Mikulski graduated with a Bachelor of Arts in sociology from Mount Saint Agnes College (now a part of Loyola University Maryland) in 1958. She earned her Master of Social Work from the University of Maryland, Baltimore in 1965. She worked as a social worker for Catholic charities and Baltimore's Department of Social Services, helping at-risk children and educating seniors about the Medicare program. Mikulski became an activist social worker when she heard about plans to build Interstate 95 through Baltimore's Fells Point and Canton neighborhoods. She helped organize communities on both sides of the city and successfully fought to stop the construction of the road. Her efforts to prevent the highway from running through Southeast Baltimore also resulted in the establishment of the Southeast Community Organization, a non-profit which worked to improve Baltimore neighborhoods.

== Early political career ==
Mikulski first received national attention in 1970 because of her remarks at a conference at The Catholic University of America regarding "Ethnic Americans" convened by Msgr. Geno Baroni. Her message became one of the major documents of the "ethnic movement". Mikulski's remarks included the following:

America is not a melting pot. It is a sizzling cauldron for the ethnic American who feels that he has been politically courted and legally extorted by both government and private enterprise. The ethnic American is sick of being stereotyped as a racist and dullard by phony white liberals, pseudo black militants and patronizing bureaucrats. He pays the bill for every major government program and gets nothing or little in the way of return. Tricked by the political rhetoric of the illusionary funding for black-oriented social programs, he turns his anger to race—when he himself is the victim of class prejudice.

[He] has worked hard all his life to become a 'good American;' he and his sons have fought on every battlefield—then he is made fun of because he likes the flag. The ethnic American is overtaxed and underserved at every level of government. He does not have fancy lawyers or expensive lobbyists getting him tax breaks on his income. Being a home owner, he shoulders the rising property taxes—the major revenue source for the municipalities in which he lives. Yet he enjoys very little from these unfair and burdensome levies.

... [T]he ethnic American also feels unappreciated for the contribution he makes to society. He resents the way the working class is looked down upon. In many instances he is treated like the machine he operates or the pencil he pushes. He is tired of being treated like an object of production. The public and private institutions have made him frustrated by their lack of response to his needs. At present he feels powerless in his daily dealings with and efforts to change them. Unfortunately, because of old prejudices and new fears, anger is generated against other minority groups rather than those who have power. What is needed is an alliance of white and black, white collar, blue collar and no collar based on mutual need, interdependence and respect, an alliance to develop the strategy for new kinds of community organization and political participation.

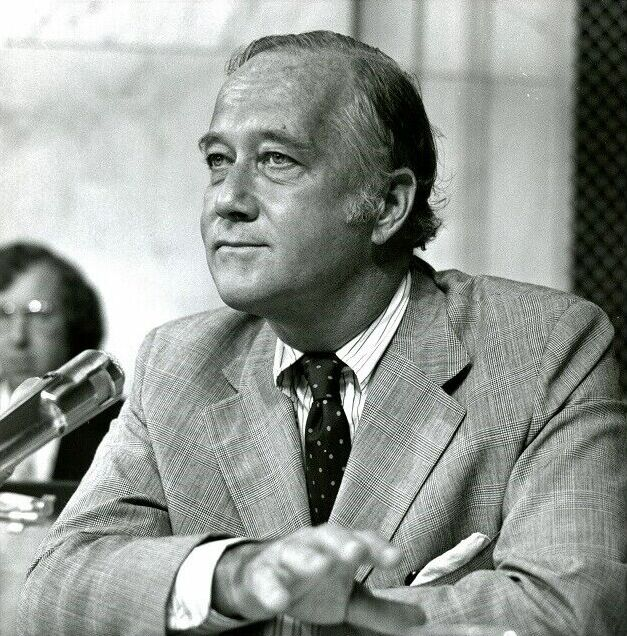
Mikulski challenged Charles Mathias for his Senate seat in 1974.

Mikulski's activism led to a seat on the Baltimore City Council in 1971. In 1973 incoming Chairperson of the Democratic National Committee Robert S. Strauss appointed then Baltimore City Councilperson Mikulski to chair the Democratic Party Commission on New Delegate Selection and Party Structure. She was instrumental in solidifying democratizing reforms to the national delegate selection process.

== U.S. House of Representatives (1977–1987) ==
In 1976, Paul Sarbanes gave up his seat in Maryland's 3rd congressional district to make a successful run for the Senate. Mikulski won a crowded seven-way Democratic primary—the key election given a heavily Democratic district—and won easily in the November elections. She was reelected four more times, never facing substantial opposition.

== U.S. Senate (1987–2017) ==
=== Elections ===
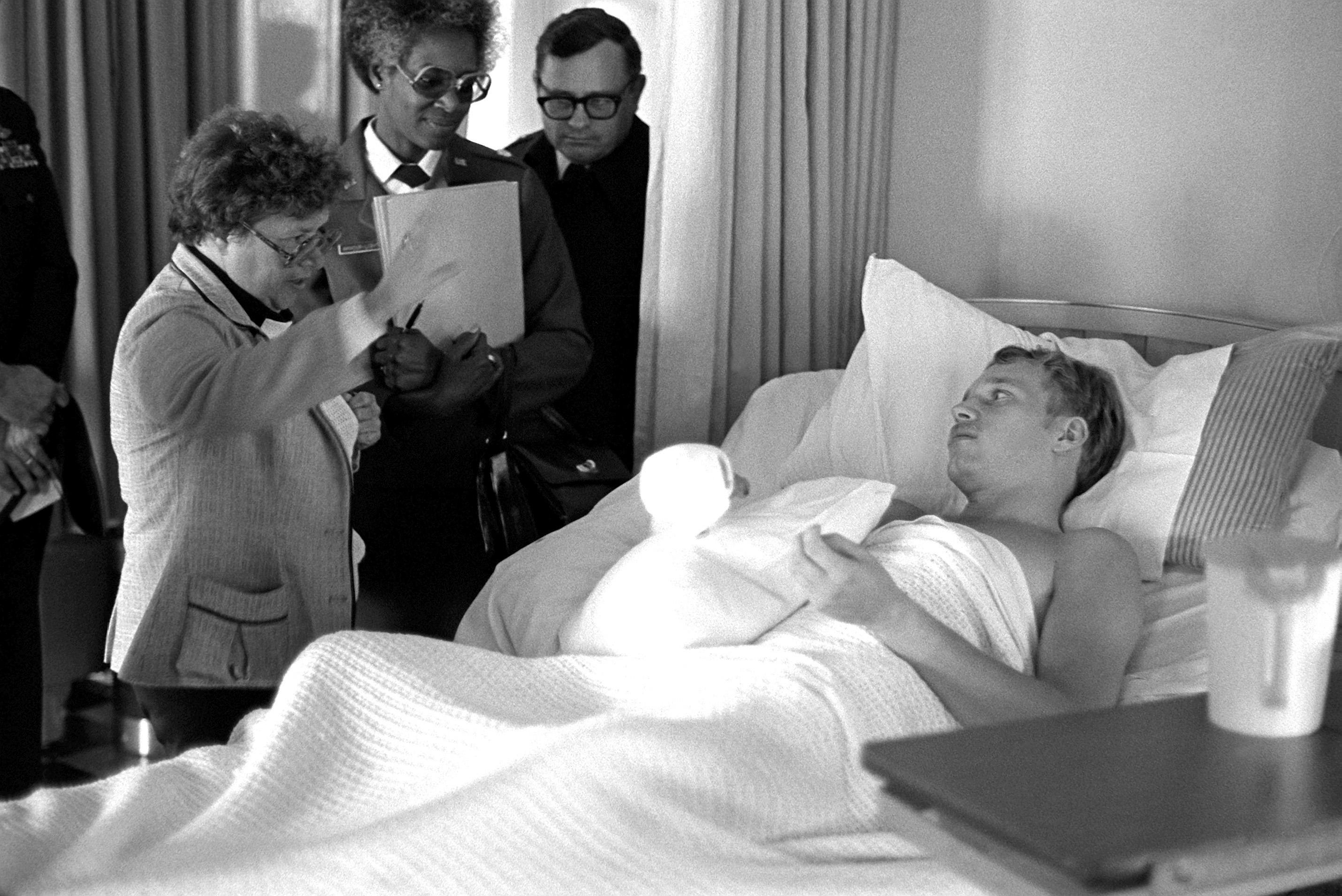
Mikulski speaking to a patient at a military hospital, 1980.

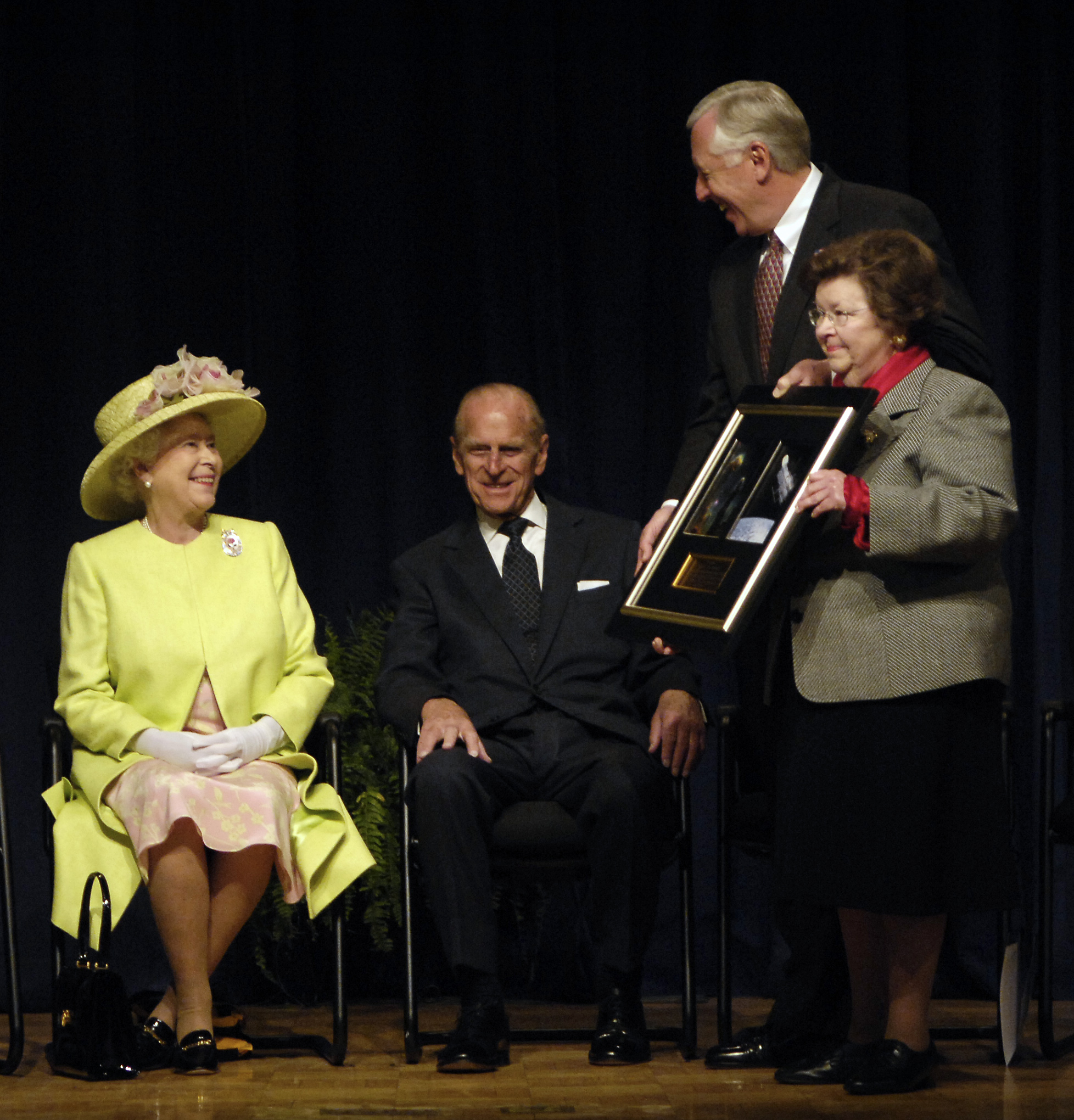
Mikulski with Steny Hoyer presenting a photo to Queen Elizabeth II and Prince Philip in Greenbelt, Maryland

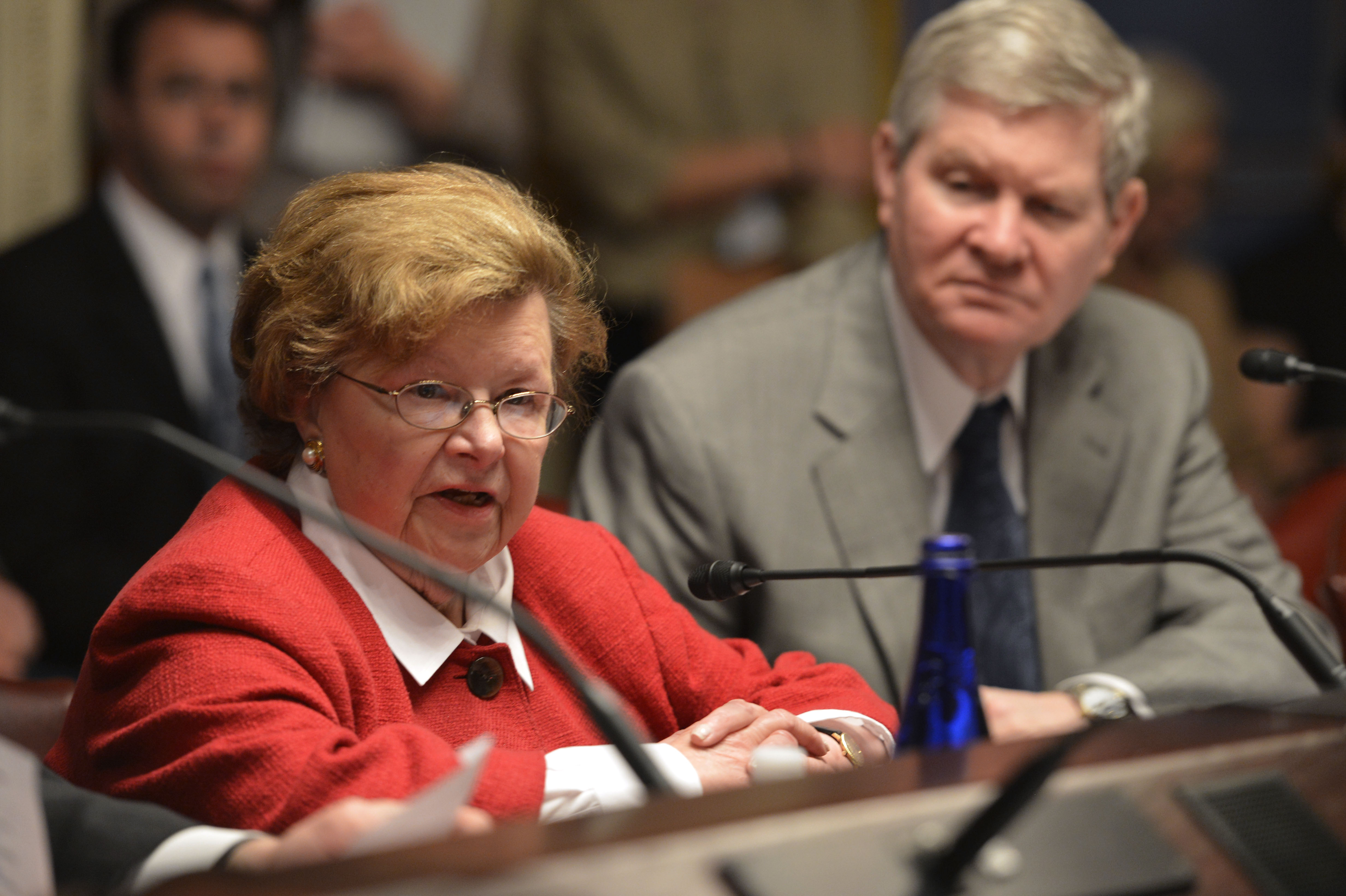
Mikulski at a press conference

Mikulski first ran for the United States Senate in 1974, winning the Democratic nomination to face Republican incumbent Charles Mathias. Although she was well known to residents in her city, Mikulski had limited name recognition in the rest of the state.

As an advocate for campaign finance reform, Mathias refused to accept any contribution over $100 to "avoid the curse of big money that has led to so much trouble in the last year". However, he still managed to raise over $250,000, nearly five times Mikulski's total. Ideologically, Mikulski and Mathias agreed on many issues, such as closing tax loopholes and easing taxes on the middle class. On two issues, however, Mathias argued to reform Congress and the U.S. tax system to address inflation and corporate price fixing, contrary to Mikulski. In retrospect, The Washington Post felt the election was "an intelligent discussion of state, national, and foreign affairs by two smart, well-informed people".

With Maryland voters, Mathias benefited from his frequent disagreements with the Richard Nixon administration and his liberal voting record. On November 5, 1974, he was re-elected by a 57% to 43% margin, though he lost badly in Baltimore City and Baltimore County, where Mikulski was popular. This election is the only election that Mikulski has ever lost.

Mathias announced his retirement before the 1986 election. At the time of this announcement, it was expected that then-Governor Harry Hughes would be the favorite to succeed Mathias. However, Hughes became caught up in the aftermath of the Maryland savings and loan crisis. He lost popularity with voters, opening the door for Mikulski's bid for the Senate. The Republican nominee was Linda Chavez, who left her post as Assistant to the President for Public Liaison in an attempt to win the seat. The election was the second time in modern U.S. history that two women faced each other in a statewide general election. The race was covered by national media, with observers noting that Chavez was very unlikely to win.

In the campaign, Chavez attacked Mikulski, a lifelong Baltimore resident, as a "San Francisco-style, George McGovern, liberal Democrat". Chavez was accused of making Mikulski's sexual orientation a central issue of the political campaign. Chavez wrote that the term referred to Jeane Kirkpatrick's 1984 Republican National Convention "Blame America First" speech, in which she coined the phrase "San Francisco Liberal" in reference to the Democratic National Convention in San Francisco. Using political advertisements and press conferences, Chavez attacked Mikulski's former aide Teresa Brennan as "anti-male" and a "radical feminist", implying that Brennan and Mikulski were radical lesbians and that "fascist feminism" was Mikulski's political philosophy. Brennan had not been part of Mikulski's staff for five years, but Chavez implied Brennan was still working on Mikulski's campaign. Mikulski did not respond in kind to the attacks. She defeated Chavez with 61% of the vote. She also served alongside Paul Sarbanes, the man she'd succeeded in the House.

Mikulski, popularly known as "Senator Barb", was re-elected with large majorities in 1992, 1998, 2004, and 2010. Having won re-election in 2010, she surpassed Margaret Chase Smith as the longest-serving female senator. ABC News named Mikulski its Person of the Week for that milestone. On March 17, 2012, she became the longest-serving female member of Congress in the history of the United States, surpassing the previous record-holder, Rep. Edith Nourse Rogers of Massachusetts, who served from 1925 to 1960.

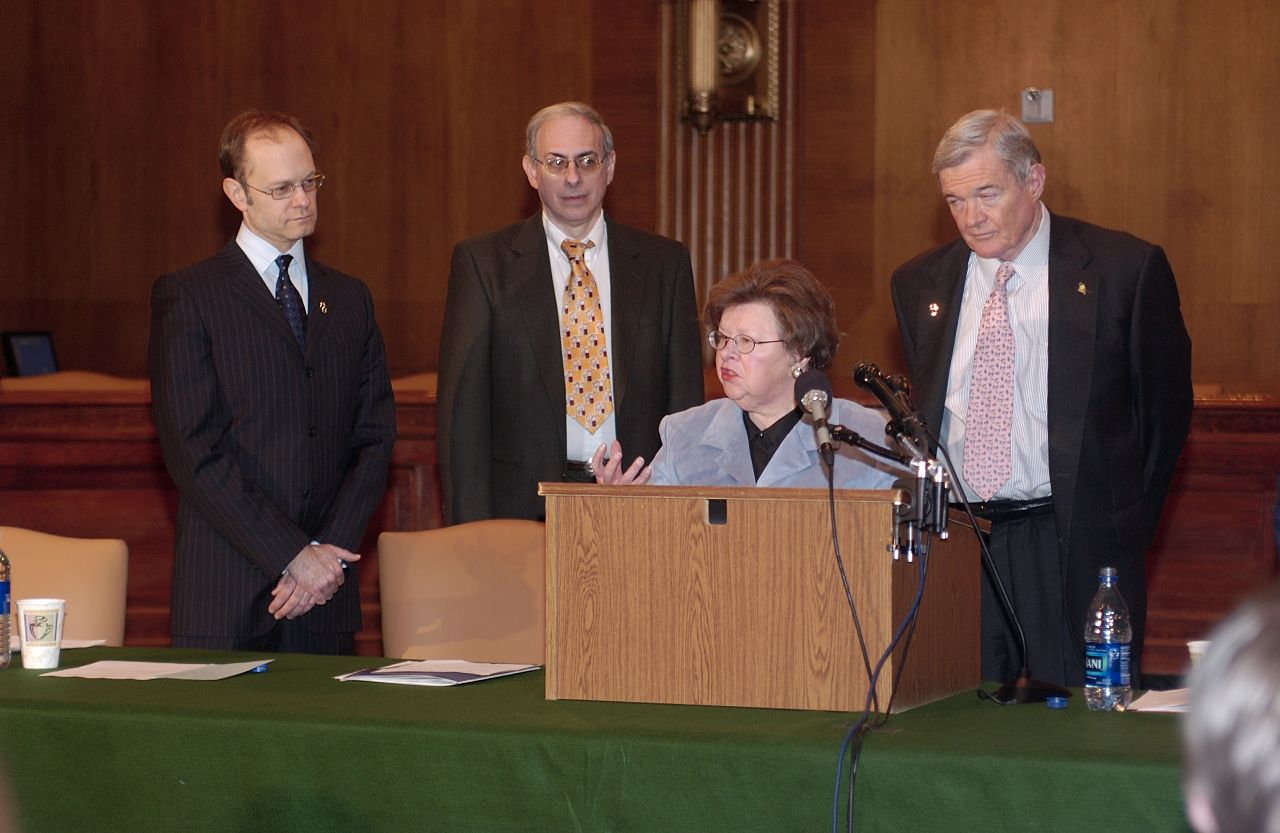
Senator Mikulski joins Senator Kit Bond and actor David Hyde Pierce in promoting awareness of Alzheimer's disease.

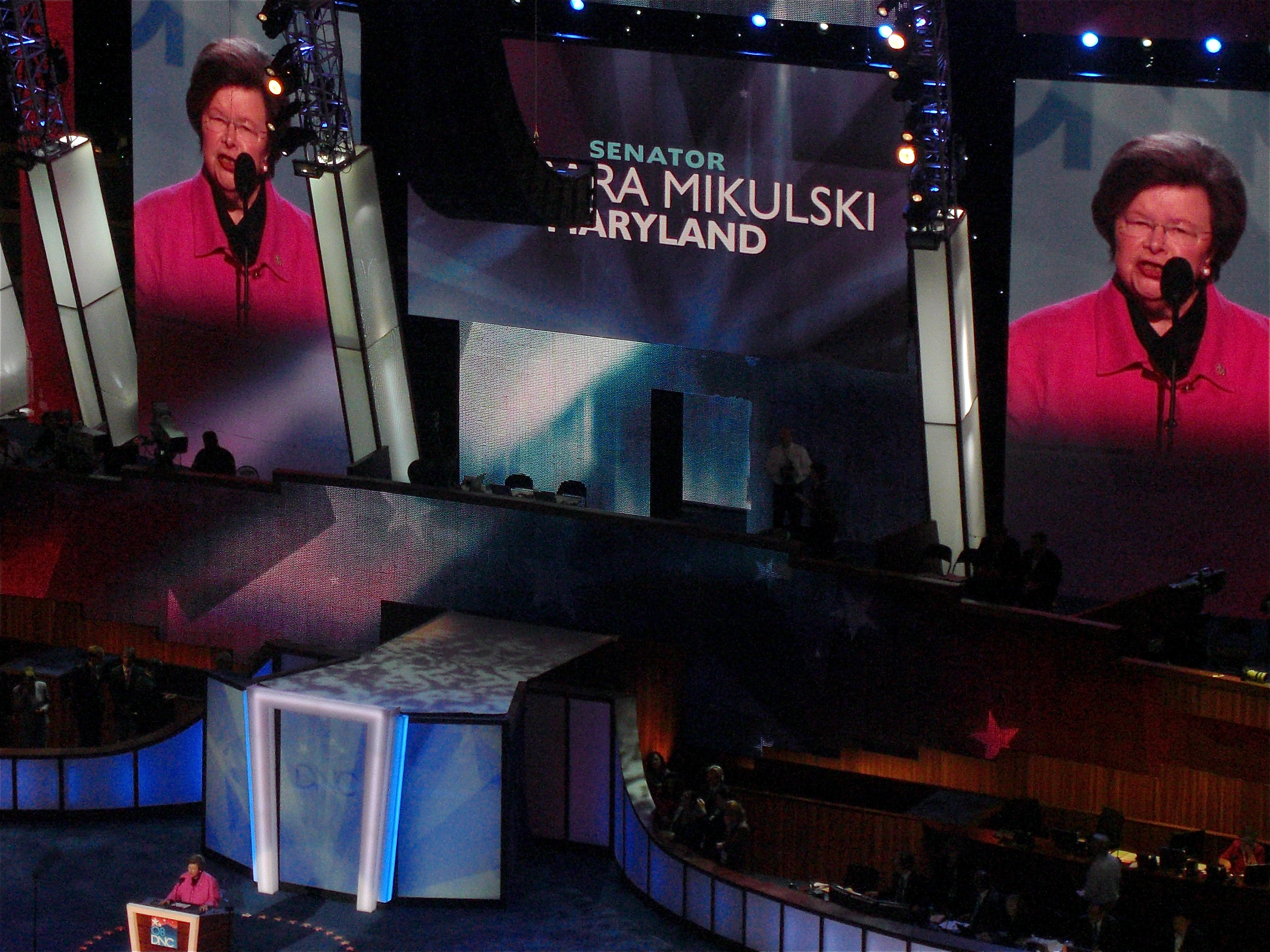
Mikulski speaks at the 2008 Democratic National Convention.

In September 2009, the "tell-all" book The Clinton Tapes revealed that during the 2000 presidential election, President Bill Clinton suggested Mikulski as a running mate for Al Gore, who instead chose his colleague Joe Lieberman. In 2007, Mikulski endorsed her colleague, Sen. Hillary Clinton (D-NY), for President of the United States, praising her as a leader and citing her desire to break the "glass ceiling" by electing the first woman president. Senator Mikulski nominated Hillary Clinton for President of the United States at the Democratic National Convention on July 26, 2016.

From 2007 to 2017, Mikulski served alongside Ben Cardin, who succeeded her in the 3rd District and held it for 20 years until succeeding Sarbanes in the Senate.

=== Legislation ===
On June 3, 2013, Mikulski introduced the Child Care and Development Block Grant Act of 2013 (S. 1086; 113th Congress), which passed in the Senate. The bill would reauthorize the Child Care and Development Block Grant Act of 1990 to provide block grants to the states to help low-income parents find child care for their children. In addition to reauthorizing the program, it also makes amendments to the law to try to improve it. Some of those improvements include required background checks on grant recipients and annual inspections. Mikulski argued that "this bill ensures that all children get the care they need and deserve."

On April 1, 2014, Mikulski introduced the Paycheck Fairness Act (S. 2199; 113th Congress), a measure that aims to strengthen the Fair Labor Standards Act's protections against pay inequalities based on gender. It is a bill that "punishes employers for retaliating against workers who share wage information, puts the justification burden on employers as to why someone is paid less and allows workers to sue for punitive damages of wage discrimination". Mikulski said that "it brings tears to my eyes to know women are working so hard and being paid less" and that "it makes me emotional when I hear that... I get angry, I get outraged and I get volcanic".

=== Committee assignments ===
In the 114th Congress, Mikulski served on the following Senate committees (standing committees in bold):

- **Committee on Appropriations** (Ranking Member)
  - Subcommittee on Commerce, Justice, Science, and Related Agencies (Ranking Member)
  - Subcommittee on Defense
  - Subcommittee on Labor, Health and Human Services, Education, and Related Agencies
  - Subcommittee on State, Foreign Operations, and Related Programs
  - Subcommittee on Transportation, Housing and Urban Development, and Related Agencies
  - As Ranking Member of the full committee, Mikulski may serve as an ex officio member of any subcommittee of which she is not a full member
- **Committee on Health, Education, Labor, and Pensions**
  - Subcommittee on Children and Families
  - Subcommittee on Primary Health and Aging
- **Select Committee on Intelligence**

=== Other ===
Women were not allowed to wear pants on the U.S. Senate floor until 1993. In 1993, Senators Mikulski and Carol Moseley Braun wore pants onto the floor in defiance of the rule, and female support staff followed soon after, with the rule being amended later that year by Senate Sergeant-at-Arms Martha Pope to allow women to wear pants on the floor so long as they also wore a jacket.

In 2014, Mikulski was voted the "meanest senator" in Washingtonian's survey of congressional staffers.

== Political positions ==
Mikulski was one of 11 senators to vote against both the 1991 and 2002 resolutions authorizing the use of force in Iraq.

Mikulski has opposed predatory lending, and has been an outspoken opponent of Fairbanks Capital (now Select Portfolio Servicing), alleged to have illegally foreclosed on over 100 homes in Maryland.

Mikulski has been an outspoken advocate for the Equal Rights Amendment. She has also spoken in support of abortion rights and has stated she does not view the opposition to this issue as being misogynistic.

On October 1, 2008, Mikulski voted in favor of HR1424, the Senate version of the Emergency Economic Stabilization Act of 2008, which provided a $700 billion bailout to the United States financial market.

In October 2013, Mikulski sponsored a bill honoring naturopathic medicine.

== Electoral history ==
1974 U.S. Senate general election in Maryland
Party	Candidate	Votes	%
Republican	Charles Mathias (inc.)	503,223	57.3
Democratic	Barbara A. Mikulski	374,663	42.7
Invalid or blank votes			
Total votes		877,886	100.00
Turnout			
Republican hold			

1986 U.S. Senate Democratic primary in Maryland
Party	Candidate	Votes	%
Democratic	Barbara A. Mikulski	307,876	49.50%
Democratic	Michael D. Barnes	195,086	31.37%
Democratic	Harry Hughes	88,908	14.30%
Democratic	Debra Hanania Freeman	9,350	1.50%
Democratic	Edward M. Olszewski	7,877	1.27%
Democratic	A. Robert Kaufman	6,505	1.05%
Democratic	Boyd E. Sweatt	3,580	0.58%
Democratic	Leonard E. Trout, Jr.	2,742	0.44%
Total votes		621,924	100.00%

1986 U.S. Senate general election in Maryland
Party	Candidate	Votes	%	±%
Democratic	Barbara A. Mikulski	675,225	60.69%	+26.85%
Republican	Linda Chavez	437,411	39.31%	−26.85%
Majority		237,814	21.37%	−10.96%
Total votes		1,017,151	100.00%	
Democratic gain from Republican		Swing		

1992 U.S. Senate Democratic primary in Maryland
Party	Candidate	Votes	%
Democratic	Barbara A. Mikulski (Incumbent)	376,444	76.75%
Democratic	Thomas M. Wheatley	31,214	6.36%
Democratic	Walter Boyd	26,467	5.40%
Democratic	Don Allensworth	19,731	4.02%
Democratic	Scott David Britt	13,001	2.65%
Democratic	James Leonard White	12,470	2.54%
Democratic	B. Emerson Sweatt	11,150	2.27%
Total votes		490,477	100.00%

1992 U.S. Senate general election in Maryland
Party	Candidate	Votes	%	±%
Democratic	Barbara A. Mikulski (Incumbent)	1,307,610	71.02%	+10.33%
Republican	Alan L. Keyes	533,688	28.98%	−10.33%
Majority		773,922	42.03%	+20.66%
Total votes		1,841,298	100.00%	
Democratic hold		Swing		

1998 U.S. Senate Democratic primary in Maryland
Party	Candidate	Votes	%
Democratic	Barbara A. Mikulski (Incumbent)	349,382	84.36%
Democratic	Ann L. Mallory	43,120	10.41%
Democratic	Kauko H. Kokkonen	21,658	5.23%
Total votes		414,160	100.00%

1998 U.S. Senate general election in Maryland
Party	Candidate	Votes	%	±%
Democratic	Barbara A. Mikulski (Incumbent)	1,062,810	70.50%	−0.51%
Republican	Ross Z. Pierpont	444,637	29.50%	+0.51%
Majority		618,173	41.01%	−1.02%
Total votes		1,507,447	100.00%	
Democratic hold		Swing		

2004 U.S. Senate Democratic primary in Maryland
Party	Candidate	Votes	%
Democratic	Barbara A. Mikulski (Incumbent)	408,848	89.88%
Democratic	A. Robert Kaufman	32,127	7.06%
Democratic	Sid Altman	13,901	3.06%
Total votes		454,876	100.00%

2004 U.S. Senate general election in Maryland
Party	Candidate	Votes	%	±%
Democratic	Barbara A. Mikulski (Incumbent)	1,504,691	64.80%	−5.70%
Republican	E. J. Pipkin	783,055	33.72%	+4.23%
Green	Maria Allwine	24,816	1.07%	
Constitution	Thomas Trump	9,009	0.39%	
Write-ins		360	0.02%	
Majority		721,636	31.08%	−9.93%
Total votes		2,321,931	100.00%	
Democratic hold		Swing		

2010 U.S. Senate Democratic primary in Maryland
Party	Candidate	Votes	%
Democratic	Barbara Mikulski (Incumbent)	388,868	82.32%
Democratic	Christopher J. Garner	35,579	7.53%
Democratic	A. Billy Bob Jaworski	15,131	3.20%
Democratic	Blaine Taylor	10,787	2.28%
Democratic	Theresa C. Scaldaferri	7,913	1.68%
Democratic	Sanquetta Taylor	7,365	1.56%
Democratic	Lih Young	6,733	1.43%
Total votes		472,376	100.00%

2010 U.S. Senate general election in Maryland
Party	Candidate	Votes	%	±%
Democratic	Barbara Mikulski (Incumbent)	1,140,531	62.19%	−2.61%
Republican	Eric Wargotz	655,666	35.75%	+2.05%
Green	Kenniss Henry	20,717	1.13%	+0.06%
Constitution	Richard Shawver	14,746	0.80%	+0.42%
Write-ins		2,213	0.11%	+0.05%
Majority		484,865	26.44%	
Total votes		1,833,873	100.00%	
Democratic hold		Swing		

== Awards and honors ==
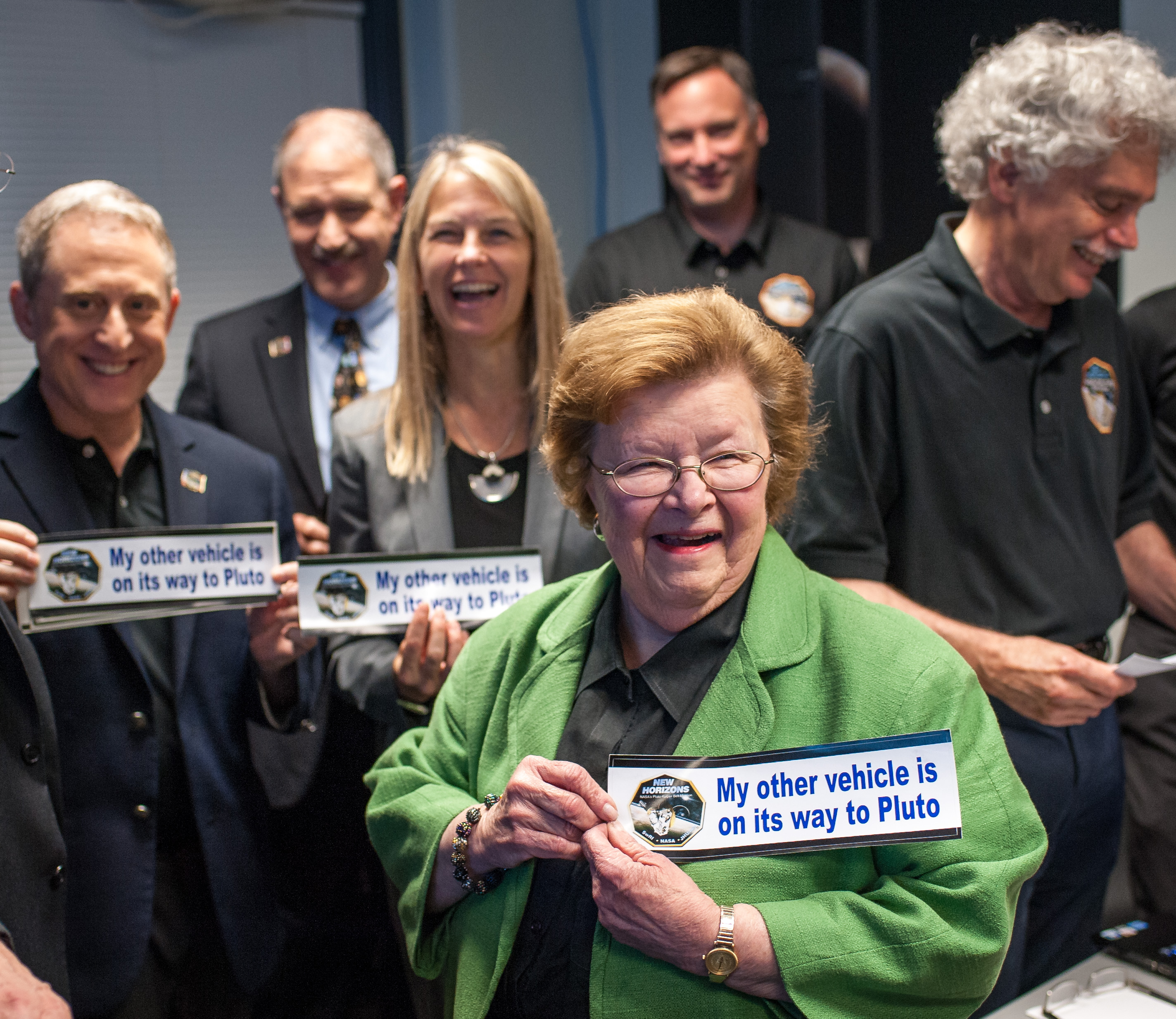
Senator Mikulski at New Horizons Pluto Flyby, 2015

In 1979, the Supersisters trading card set was produced and distributed; one of the cards featured Mikulski's name and picture.

The NASA-funded Space Telescope Science Institute (STScI) in Baltimore named one of the world's largest astronomy databases after Mikulski (Barbara A. Mikulski Archive for Space Telescopes), as she was a long time champion of the Hubble and James Webb space telescopes.

In 2011, Mikulski was inducted into the National Women's Hall of Fame.

In 2012, when NASA discovered an exploding star, they named it "Supernova Mikulski" in her honor. Also in 2012, Mikulski was presented the Harriet Ross Tubman Lifetime Achievement Award by the Maryland African American Tourism Council.

On August 22, 2013 the President of Poland Bronisław Komorowski honored Mikulski with a Commander's Cross with Star of the Order of Polonia Restituta for "outstanding achievements in the development of Polish-American cooperation and activity for Poles living in the United States".

In November 2015, Mikulski was awarded the Presidential Medal of Freedom by President Barack Obama at a ceremony in the White House.

In 2020, the Senator Barbara A. Mikulski Room, with mementos and Mikulski’s Presidential Medal of Freedom, was opened in the Enoch Pratt Free Library.

On June 8, 2022, a room in the United States Capitol was named after Mikulski. It is the Barbara Mikulski room, S-115, located on the first floor of the side of the Capitol where the Senate is. It is one of the first two rooms in the Capitol to be named after women who were senators, the other being the Margaret Chase Smith room, which was named on the same day.

== Personal life ==
Mikulski has never married and has no children. She stands at 4 ft 11 in (150 cm) tall and often jokingly said: "I may be short, but I won't be overlooked". She is a Roman Catholic. Raised in a Polish-American and devoutly Catholic family, Mikulski attended the Mount Saint Agnes College in Baltimore and considered joining Sisters of Mercy, but ultimately decided against it. Discussing her decision to remain a laywoman, she stated: "The vow of obedience did not have great appeal for me. Poverty was one thing, and I could go along with chastity. But it was obedience. I thought, 'My God, all my life there could be someone telling me what to do and where to go!' And inside me beats the heart of a protestor."

== See also ==
- Virginia S. Baker
- Women in the United States House of Representatives
- Women in the United States Senate

Party political offices
Preceded by Daniel Brewster	Democratic nominee for U.S. Senator from Maryland (Class 3); 1974	Succeeded by Edward Conroy
Preceded by Edward Conroy	Democratic nominee for U.S. Senator from Maryland (Class 3); 1986, 1992, 1998, 2004, 2010	Succeeded by Chris Van Hollen
Preceded by David Pryor	Secretary of the Senate Democratic Conference; 1995–2005	Succeeded by Debbie Stabenow
U.S. House of Representatives
Preceded by Paul Sarbanes	Member of the U.S. House of Representatives from Maryland's 3rd congressional district 1977–1987	Succeeded by Ben Cardin
U.S. Senate
Preceded by Charles Mathias	U.S. Senator (Class 3) from Maryland; 1987–2017; Served alongside: Paul Sarbanes, Ben Cardin	Succeeded by Chris Van Hollen
Preceded by Dan Inouye	Chair of the Senate Appropriations Committee; 2012–2015	Succeeded by Thad Cochran
Preceded by Richard Shelby	Ranking Member of the Senate Appropriations Committee; 2015–2017	Succeeded by Patrick Leahy
U.S. order of precedence (ceremonial)
Preceded by Chris Dodd as Former U.S. Senator	Order of precedence of the United States as Former U.S. Senator	Succeeded by Tom Harkin as Former U.S. Senator
