= East Hollywood High School =

Location
- 2185 S 3600 W West Valley City, Utah 84119; 40°43′20″N 111°58′40″W

Information
- Type: Charter school
- Founded: 2004
- Founder: Eric Lindsey
- Principal: Katrina Walker
- Faculty: 16
- Teaching staff: 13.57 (FTE)
- Grades: 9–12
- Enrollment: 271 (2023–2024)
- Student to teacher ratio: 19.97
- Colors: Blue and gold
- Mascot: [Hollywood] Star (2004–2011), ManBear (since 2011)
- Website: East Hollywood High School website

East Hollywood High School (EHHS) is an accredited public charter school in West Valley City, Utah, United States. It specializes in film production training for students grades 9–12. As of 2013, the school principal is Katrina Walker. Chartered directly through the Utah State Office of Education, EHHS enrolls approximately 350 students each year.

== Academics ==
The student body is fewer than 350 and average class sizes are smaller than 25 students.

Many students take advantage of the school's Concurrent Enrollment partnership with Snow College, through which they can receive college credit without leaving EHHS.

=== Three-period day ===
Students at East Hollywood take only three classes at a time, allowing them to focus their attention and participate in project-based learning. Classes are approximately two hours daily. Each grading term is only six weeks long with six grading periods per school year.

This schedule provides many benefits:

- Students can earn 9 credits in a school year.
- Extended time in class allows students to complete schoolwork in class while the teachers provide individual support.
- Only three classes to focus on at a time prevents students from becoming overwhelmed with too many teachers and assignments.
- Teachers know each student and their individual needs because they teach fewer students at a time with only three classes.
- Six-week terms prevent students from falling too far behind and they are generally able to catch up quickly.
- Six grading periods allow students the opportunity for a fresh start every six weeks.

== Programs ==
- Film
- Special effects makeup
- Music composition and sound recording
- Visual arts
- Career and technical education: business and marketing, hospitality and tourism, family and consumer sciences, video/audio production
- Free credit recovery
- Specialized instruction
- Advisory
- Athletics
- Snow College live interactive concurrent enrollment
- Night school

== Clubs and organizations ==
- SkillsUSA
- DECA
- Family, Career and Community Leaders of America

== Arts ==
=== Film ===
In previous years, film production classes have produced a weekly school news program. The weekly news program is no longer being produced.

School film projects include:

- 2008–2009 Shakespeare's Macbeth
- 2009–2010 Shakespeare's Much Ado About Nothing
- 2010–2011 Shakespeare's Hamlet
- 2011–2012 Paradise High
- 2012–2013 Backup Copy: A Paradise High Film
- 2013–2014 Step Larpers: A Quest for Unity
- 2015–2016 Benevolent Boys
- 2017–2018 Worst Prom Ever
- 2019–2020 Graduation Sucks
