= 1998 United States Senate election in Maryland =

- November 3, 1998
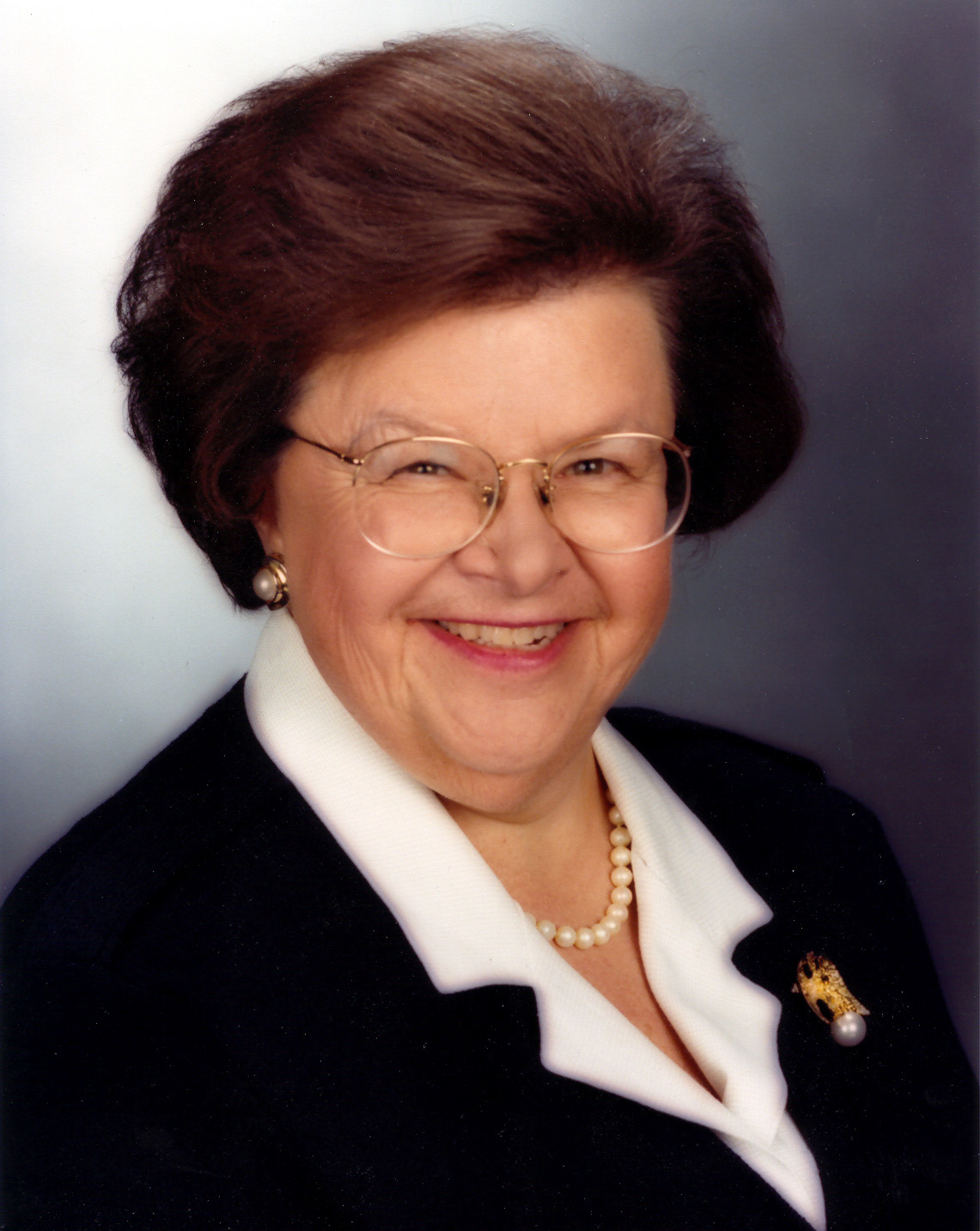

Nominee	Barbara Mikulski	Ross Pierpont
Party	Democratic	Republican
Popular vote	1,062,810	444,637
Percentage	70.50%	29.50%
- County results Mikulski: 50–60% 60–70% 70–80% 80–90% Pierpont: 50–60%
U.S. senator before election
Barbara Mikulski
Democratic
Elected U.S. Senator
Barbara Mikulski
Democratic

The 1998 United States Senate election in Maryland was held November 3, 1998. Democratic incumbent Barbara Mikulski won re-election to a third term.

== Democratic primary ==
=== Candidates ===
- Kauko H. Kokkonen
- Ann L. Mallory
- Barbara Mikulski, incumbent U.S. Senator

=== Results ===
Democratic primary results by county: Mikulski—70–80% Mikulski—80–90% Mikulski—90–100%

Democratic Primary results
Party	Candidate	Votes	%
Democratic	Barbara A. Mikulski (incumbent)	349,382	84.36%
Democratic	Ann L. Mallory	43,120	10.41%
Democratic	Kauko H. Kokkonen	21,658	5.23%
Total votes		414,160	100.00%

== Republican primary ==
=== Candidates ===
- Barry Steve Asbury
- Michael Gloth
- Howard David Greyber
- George Liebmann
- Bradlyn McClanahan
- Ross Pierpont, retired surgeon
- John Stafford, U.S. Department of the Interior administrative law judge
- John Taylor
- Scott Thomas
- Kenneth Wayman

=== Results ===
Republican Primary results
Party	Candidate	Votes	%
Republican	Ross Z. Pierpont	32,691	18.40%
Republican	John Taylor	22,855	12.87%
Republican	Michael Gloth	19,926	11.22%
Republican	Kenneth Wayman	16,505	9.29%
Republican	Bradlyn McClanahan	16,439	9.25%
Republican	Howard David Greyber	16,177	9.11%
Republican	John Stafford	15,031	8.46%
Republican	George Liebmann	14,440	8.13%
Republican	Barry Steve Asbury	11,881	6.69%
Republican	Thomas Scott	11,707	6.59%
Total votes		177,652	100.00%

== General election ==
=== Candidates ===
- Barbara Mikulski, incumbent U.S. senator since 1987
- Ross Pierpont, retired surgeon

=== Polling ===
Poll source	Date(s) administered	Sample size (Note: Key: A – all adults RV – registered voters LV – likely voters V – unclear)	Margin of error	Barbara Mikulski (D)	Ross Pierpont (R)	Undecided
Harris Insights & Analytics	October 20, 1998	911	—	67%	27%	6%
Mason-Dixon Polling & Strategy	October 15–17, 1998	821 (LV)	± 3.5%	67%	26%	7%
Mason-Dixon Polling & Strategy	September 18–20, 1998	804 (LV)	± 3.5%	69%	19%	12%

=== Results ===
United States Senate election in Maryland, 1998
Party	Candidate	Votes	%	±%
Democratic	Barbara A. Mikulski (incumbent)	1,062,810	70.50%	−0.51%
Republican	Ross Z. Pierpont	444,637	29.50%	+0.51%
Majority		618,173	41.01%	−1.02%
Total votes		1,507,447	100.00%	
Democratic hold		Swing		

=== Results by county ===
County	Barbara A. Mikulski Democratic		Ross Pierpont Republican		Margin		Total Votes Cast
County	#	%	#	%	#	%	Total Votes Cast
Allegany	13077	67.33%	6344	32.67%	6733	34.67%	19421
Anne Arundel	97955	64.11%	54834	35.89%	43121	28.22%	152789
Baltimore (City)	135726	89.73%	15539	10.27%	120187	79.45%	151265
Baltimore (County)	162324	67.81%	77048	32.19%	85276	35.62%	239372
Calvert	14057	63.64%	8031	36.36%	6026	27.28%	22088
Caroline	4089	60.11%	2714	39.89%	1375	20.21%	6803
Carroll	24200	51.47%	22815	48.53%	1385	2.95%	47015
Cecil	12593	61.91%	7749	38.09%	4844	23.81%	20342
Charles	20175	63.98%	11356	36.02%	8819	27.97%	31531
Dorchester	6007	69.55%	2630	30.45%	3377	39.10%	8637
Frederick	30235	56.98%	22829	43.02%	7406	13.96%	53064
Garrett	3708	46.25%	4309	53.75%	-601	-7.50%	8017
Harford	43938	60.69%	28462	39.31%	15476	21.38%	72400
Howard	55493	67.19%	27099	32.81%	28394	34.38%	82592
Kent	4689	69.82%	2027	30.18%	2662	39.64%	6716
Montgomery	199461	73.06%	73543	26.94%	125918	46.12%	273004
Prince George's	158184	83.72%	30753	16.28%	127431	67.45%	188937
Queen Anne's	8103	61.82%	5004	38.18%	3099	23.64%	13107
St. Mary's	14440	67.14%	7067	32.86%	7373	34.28%	21507
Somerset	4037	66.18%	2063	33.82%	1974	32.36%	6100
Talbot	6938	59.85%	4655	40.15%	2283	19.69%	11593
Washington	19228	56.51%	14798	43.49%	4430	13.02%	34026
Wicomico	13679	63.49%	7867	36.51%	5812	26.97%	21546
Worcester	10471	67.24%	5101	32.76%	5370	34.48%	15572
Total	1062807	70.50%	444637	29.50%	618170	41.01%	1507444

== See also ==
- 1998 United States Senate elections
- 1998 United States elections
