= John Stafford (American politician) =

American politician (1940–2011)

John Stafford (December 18, 1940 – June 29, 2011) was an American politician and member of the Republican party from Maryland. He was the Chief Administrative Law Judge for the U.S. Department of the Interior in the first Reagan administration and was a candidate for Senate District 21 in the 2006 Maryland Senate election.

== Biography ==
John Stafford was born December 18, 1940, to a United States Marine Corps family at Parris Island, South Carolina. His paternal ancestors were Irish Catholic migrants from County Wexford, and claim links to the Dukes of Buckingham. His maternal ancestors were from Sweden and Bohemia.

Stafford was educated at the University of Maryland, College Park. In 1961, he represented the Student Government Association (S.G.A.) on the Campus Chest Committee which oversaw the charity projects of student organizations. He also served on the Calendar Committee for the S.G.A. in that year. Now-U.S. House Majority Leader Steny Hoyer was elected VP on that same ballot. He was a member of Omicron Delta Kappa, in 1962 and 1963.

Stafford contributed to many of the University of Maryland's media publications. He worked for the daily newspaper, Diamondback, in 1961 and he wrote the column "Cloakroom Caucus". He started working for the M-Book in 1961 and became editor-in-chief in 1962. He also worked on the yearbook, Terrapin in 1961, representing the Men's Dorms.

He was a DJ for four years on WMUC with his four-hour evening show every Sunday. The show played pop and folk, and early R&B songs on 45s and LPs of those earliest singers, most of whom are now in the R&B Hall of Fame in Cleveland. Stafford met and knew many of those early pioneer artists—Ruthie Brown, The Platters, The Drifters, etc.—personally, from the Casino Royale in downtown DC in the 1950s.

He served four years in the US Marine Corps as a lawyer during the Vietnam War. His cases as a prosecutor and defense counsel at Cherry Pt. MCAS and NAVARA and the Navy JAG Investigations Division included three of the most important cases arising during that war.

The case of US v. Denzil Allen was the first torture and mass murder and atrocity case of the Vietnam War, nine months before the My Lai massacre. The case of US v. David Y. Przybycien led to setting the limit on how long a serviceman may be detained before trial at 90 days, or charges must be dismissed. Stafford represented Przybycien in his appeal. That rule was later adopted by the Federal criminal courts, on a 60-day basis.

The case of US v. John Phillip Wass raised the issue of whether the United States was in "a time of war" in Vietnam, as Congress had not declared war (as required by the Constitution), but merely passed the infamous Gulf of Tonkin Resolution in a rush requested by President Lyndon Johnson, before any confirmation of the reality of the second alleged North Vietnamese attack on the destroyer USS Turner Joy could be confirmed.

John Stafford died June 29, 2011, at 8:30 pm at the Orlando Regional Medical Center, Orlando, Florida.

=== Political career ===
He was elected a Democratic Precinct Committeeman in the 43rd Legislative District of Washington State in 1964, on the ballot with Lyndon Johnson and former Congressman James McDermott, who was elected a state representative. Stafford has worked for other candidates on about 50 political campaigns from county-level to presidential over 54 years. He began in 1952 with Presidential candidate Dwight D. Eisenhower, and the next 32 years for Republicans, beginning in 1979 as a National Vice-Chairman of Reagan Finance. This was at a time when Gov. Reagan was written off, as was Stafford's boyhood friend since 1947 at the Portsmouth Naval Shipyard. He worked for Sen. John McCain, in 2007. Stafford also worked for Bob Dole's 1996 presidential campaign. Stafford has run for the US Senate in past elections in Maryland, in 1998, 2000, and 2004, as well as for the House of Delegates in 2002, and for the Senate of Maryland in 2006.

John Stafford was the Chief Administrative Law Judge for the U.S. Department of the Interior in the first Reagan administration. He was also National Vice-Chairman of Reagan Finance in 1979, and Special Counsel for the Chairman, Warren G. Magnuson, of the U.S. Senate Committee on Commerce. In this position he worked on the Rail Services Act of 1975, the 4R Act, where he proposed the re-privatization of Conrail, with the sale of stock to the public, which occurred in 1986, and is now owned by Norfolk Southern and CSX.

Stafford also served as Caucus Counsel for the majority leaderships of both the Washington State House and Senate, and as counsel to two committees thereof.

Finishing second in a field of nine in the Republican primary in 2004, he was outspent by the 2004 US Senate primary winner, State Senator E. J. Pipkin, by nearly $1 million. Stafford won one of three Republican nominations for the Maryland House of Delegates in 2002 in the 13th District of Howard County. He was then outspent by 100 to 1 by the 8-year Democratic incumbent, Shane Pendergrass. All three republicans lost the general election.

Stafford was also the nominated Republican candidate for Senate District 21 in the 2006. He voluntarily stepped aside for Sen. John Giannetti, the Democratic incumbent, when John offered to switch to the Republican party, as reported by the "Laurel Leader" and by "The Washington Post" (for whom Stafford was a paper boy in 1953 in Chevy Chase DC) Maryland congressional elections.

== Platform ==
Stafford was pro-life. He opposed slot machine casino gambling, gun control, and the many stresses and costs on families and family formations such as excessive income, sales, and real estate taxes. He supported his improved and fairer version of the Cong. Linder/Gov. Huckabee, et al.-supported, "Fair Tax". Stafford's proposal would abolish Federal personal income taxation and the 16th Amendment. Stafford would replace it completely with a Constitutional point-of-sales Federal sales tax. He has advocated this necessary change in the many Federal sources of revenue for 4 decades with the 3 Members of Congress and the US Senate for whom he has worked, first as a Congressional Staffer and later as Special Counsel to the Chairman of the US Senate Committee on Commerce. Stafford was the one who persuaded the former Chairman of the U.S. House Ways and Means Committee Chairman, Bill Archer, the Congressman of George H.W. Bush, from Houston, TX, and his Chief Counsel, to this position in 1995, which proposed legislation Stafford also prepared as a White Paper for U.S. Sen. Bob Dole during Dole's 1996 Presidential race, where Stafford was a close and voluntarily unpaid advisor for 3 1/2 years. By alerting the Budget Director, Myrt Charney, of the State of Alaska, and its then-Gov. Egan, in 1973, of the impending bankruptcy of that State by 1979, Stafford played a key role in the repeal of the State income tax in that State. The second-time Governor, Democrat Bill Egan, called a special hydrocarbon tax structure session of the Alaska Legislature and put that State on a sound financial footing ever since. Stafford's warning was connected to his job as a Consultant with Mathematical Sciences NW of Seattle, the firm which wrote the accurate socioeconomic study for the Alyeska Pipeline Co. which then built the Trans-Alaska oil pipeline. A Libertarian Party-elected friend of Stafford's, a member of that legislature, then was able to secure all the support needed to repeal that state-level income tax. And Alaska's Permanent Fund, established because the State's finances were put on that sound basis after Stafford's study and research-based warning, has now paid to all its legal residents as much as $2000 in income per year, rather than taxing their annual income.
