= 2004 United States Senate election in Maryland =

- November 2, 2004
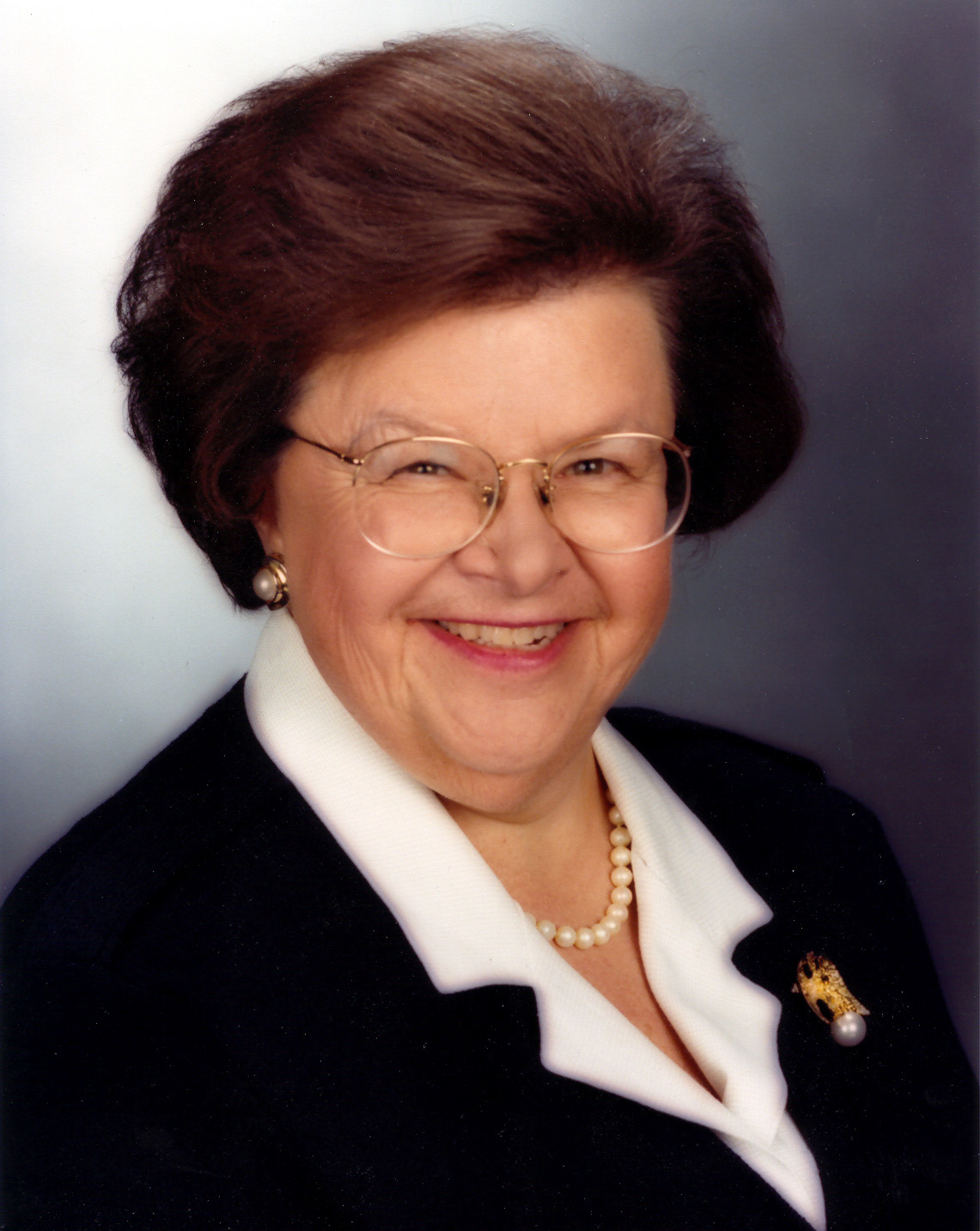

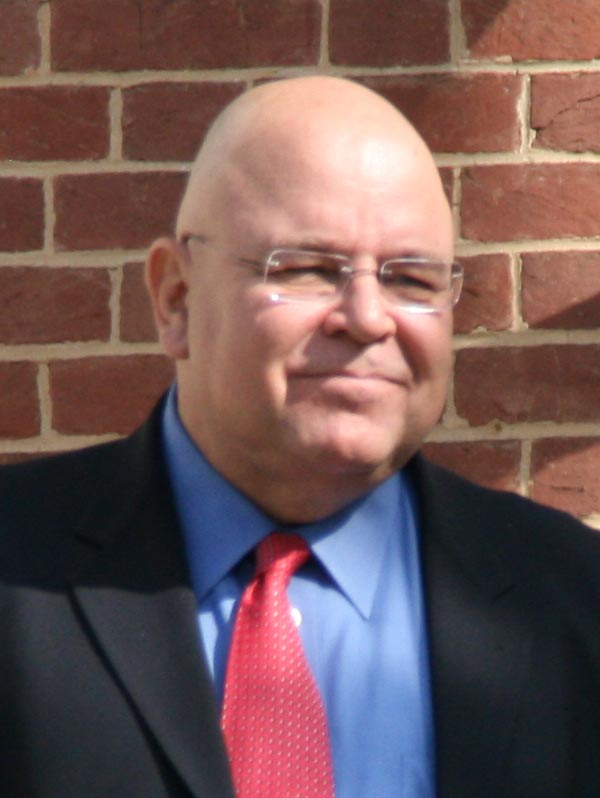
Nominee	Barbara Mikulski	E. J. Pipkin
Party	Democratic	Republican
Popular vote	1,504,691	783,055
Percentage	64.80%	33.72%
- County results Mikulski: 40–50% 50–60% 60–70% 70–80% 80–90% Pipkin: 50–60% 60–70%
U.S. senator before election
Barbara Mikulski
Democratic
Elected U.S. Senator
Barbara Mikulski
Democratic

The 2004 United States Senate election in Maryland was held on November 2, 2004. Incumbent Democratic U.S. Senator Barbara Mikulski won re-election to a fourth term. This is the most recent time that a Democratic Senate candidate has won Allegeny County, Caroline County, St. Mary's County or Worcester County. This is the last time that the winning candidate carried a majority of Maryland's county-level jurisdictions in a United States Senate election in Maryland.

== Democratic primary ==
=== Candidates ===
- Sid Altman, accountant
- Robert Kaufman, social organizer
- Barbara Mikulski, incumbent U.S. senator

=== Results ===
Democratic primary results
Party	Candidate	Votes	%
Democratic	Barbara A. Mikulski (incumbent)	408,848	89.88%
Democratic	A. Robert Kaufman	32,127	7.06%
Democratic	Sid Altman	13,901	3.06%
Total votes		454,876	100.00%

== Republican primary ==
=== Candidates ===
- Ray Bly, Vietnam War veteran
- Earl S. Gordon, surveyor
- Dorothy Curry Jennings, educator
- James A. Kodak, research associate at the University of Maryland
- Eileen Martin, educator
- E. J. Pipkin, state senator
- John Stafford, government bureaucrat
- Corrogan R. Vaughn, Baptist deacon
- Gene Zarwell, perennial candidate

=== Results ===
Republican primary results
Party	Candidate	Votes	%
Republican	E. J. Pipkin	70,229	50.58%
Republican	John Stafford	14,661	10.56%
Republican	Eileen Martin	11,748	8.46%
Republican	Dorothy Curry Jennings	10,401	7.49%
Republican	Earl S. Gordon	8,233	5.93%
Republican	Gene Zarwell	6,865	4.94%
Republican	Ray Bly	6,244	4.50%
Republican	James A. Kodak	5,328	3.84%
Republican	Corrogan R. Vaughn	5,146	3.71%
Total votes		138,855	100.00%

== General election ==
=== Candidates ===
- Maria Allwine (G)
- Barbara Mikulski (D), incumbent U.S. senator
- E. J. Pipkin (R), state senator
- Thomas Trump (C)

=== Predictions ===
Source	Ranking	As of
Sabato's Crystal Ball	Safe D	November 1, 2004

=== Results ===
United States Senate election in Maryland, 2004
Party	Candidate	Votes	%	±%
Democratic	Barbara A. Mikulski (incumbent)	1,504,691	64.80%	−5.70%
Republican	E. J. Pipkin	783,055	33.72%	+4.23%
Green	Maria Allwine	24,816	1.07%	
Constitution	Thomas Trump	9,009	0.39%	
Write-ins		360	0.02%	
Majority		721,636	31.08%	−9.93%
Total votes		2,321,931	100.00%	
Democratic hold		Swing		

=== Results by county ===
County	Barbara A. Mikulski Democratic		E.J. Pipkin Republican		Maria Allwine Green		Margin		Total votes cast
County	#	%	#	%	#	%	#	%	Total votes cast
Allegany	15238	53.67%	12882	45.37%	271	0.95%	2356	8.30%	28391
Anne Arundel	129166	55.16%	102522	43.79%	2458	1.05%	26644	11.38%	234146
Baltimore (City)	172427	86.55%	23759	11.93%	3045	1.53%	148668	74.62%	199231
Baltimore (County)	217688	63.00%	124092	35.91%	3781	1.09%	93596	27.09%	345561
Calvert	19543	50.97%	18422	48.05%	374	0.98%	1121	2.92%	38339
Caroline	5543	50.09%	5439	49.15%	84	0.76%	104	0.94%	11066
Carroll	32391	41.64%	44704	57.47%	692	0.89%	-12313	-15.83%	77787
Cecil	17371	47.56%	18843	51.59%	310	0.85%	-1472	-4.03%	36524
Charles	34305	60.89%	21547	38.24%	491	0.87%	12758	22.64%	56343
Dorchester	7571	58.52%	5284	40.84%	82	0.63%	2287	17.68%	12937
Frederick	49336	50.60%	47081	48.29%	1081	1.11%	2255	2.31%	97498
Garrett	4540	38.01%	7330	61.37%	73	0.61%	-2790	-23.36%	11943
Harford	53444	48.24%	56465	50.96%	890	0.80%	-3021	-2.73%	110799
Howard	82479	63.14%	46610	35.68%	1538	1.18%	35869	27.46%	130627
Kent	5117	56.54%	3860	42.65%	73	0.81%	1257	13.89%	9050
Montgomery	291839	72.48%	106101	26.35%	4702	1.17%	185738	46.13%	402642
Prince George's	264088	85.96%	39863	12.98%	3270	1.06%	224225	72.98%	307221
Queen Anne's	9332	43.52%	11964	55.80%	146	0.68%	-2632	-12.27%	21442
St. Mary's	18440	50.37%	17802	48.63%	368	1.01%	638	1.74%	36610
Somerset	5157	59.21%	3501	40.20%	51	0.59%	1656	19.01%	8709
Talbot	9855	53.26%	8501	45.94%	147	0.79%	1354	7.32%	18503
Washington	26431	47.11%	29181	52.01%	496	0.88%	-2750	-4.90%	56108
Wicomico	19866	54.48%	16348	44.83%	251	0.69%	3518	9.65%	36465
Worcester	13524	54.93%	10954	44.49%	142	0.58%	2570	10.44%	24620
Total	1504691	65.07%	783055	33.86%	24816	1.07%	721636	31.21%	2312562

==== Counties that flipped from Democratic to Republican ====
- Carroll (largest municipality: Eldersburg)
- Cecil (largest municipality: Elkton)
- Harford (largest municipality: Aberdeen)
- Queen Anne's (largest municipality: Stevensville)
- Washington (largest municipality: Hagerstown)

== See also ==
- 2004 United States Senate elections
- 2004 United States elections
