= 1992 United States Senate election in Maryland =

- November 3, 1992
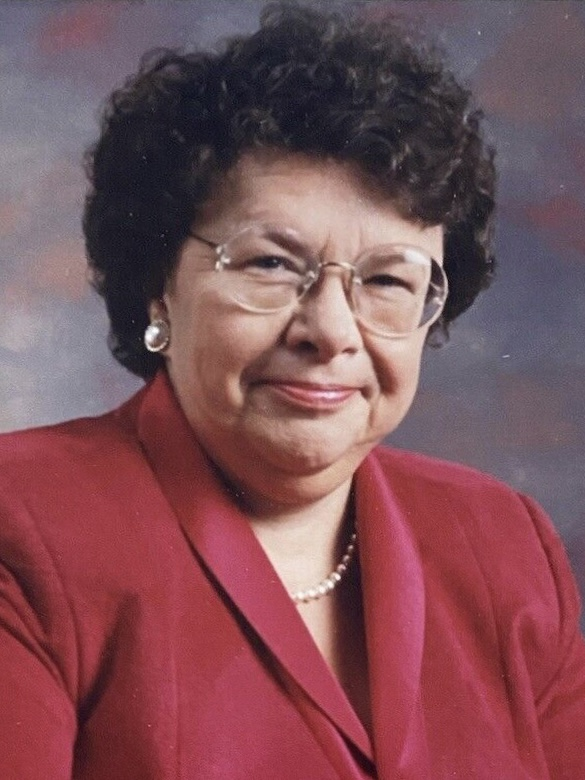

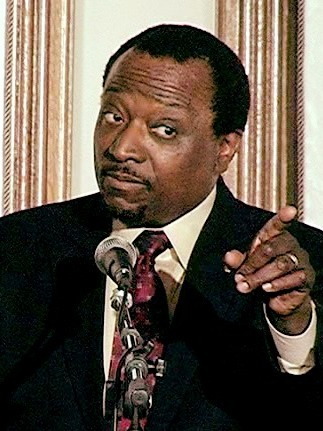
Nominee	Barbara Mikulski	Alan Keyes
Party	Democratic	Republican
Popular vote	1,307,610	533,688
Percentage	71.02%	28.98%
- County results Mikulski: 50–60% 60–70% 70–80% 80–90% Keyes: 50–60%
U.S. senator before election
Barbara Mikulski
Democratic
Elected U.S. Senator
Barbara Mikulski
Democratic

The 1992 United States Senate election in Maryland was held on November 3, 1992. Incumbent Democratic U.S. Senator Barbara Mikulski won re-election to a second term.

== Democratic primary ==
=== Candidates ===
- Barbara Mikulski, incumbent U.S. Senator
- Thomas M. Wheatley
- Walter Boyd
- Don Allensworth
- Scott David Britt
- James Leonard White
- Emerson Sweatt

=== Results ===
Democratic primary results by county: Map legend: Mikulski—50–60%; Mikulski—60–70%; Mikulski—70–80%; Mikulski—80–90%

Democratic primary results
Party	Candidate	Votes	%
Democratic	Barbara Mikulski (incumbent)	376,444	76.75%
Democratic	Thomas M. Wheatley	31,214	6.36%
Democratic	Walter Boyd	26,467	5.40%
Democratic	Don Allensworth	19,731	4.02%
Democratic	Scott David Britt	13,001	2.65%
Democratic	James Leonard White	12,470	2.54%
Democratic	B. Emerson Sweatt	11,150	2.27%
Total votes		490,477	100.00%

== Republican primary ==
=== Candidates ===
- James H. Berry
- John J. Bishop, Jr., Maryland State Senator
- Joseph I. Cassilly, Harford County State's Attorney
- Herman J. Hannan
- Stuart Hopkins
- Joyce Friend-Nalepka
- Alan Keyes, former Assistant Secretary of State for International Organization Affairs and nominee in 1988
- Martha Scanlan Klima, Maryland State Delegate
- Scott L. Meredith
- Ross Zimmerman Pierpont, perennial candidate
- Edward R. Shannon
- S. Rob Sobhani, aide to Congresswoman Connie Morella
- Romie A. Songer
- Gene Zarwell, retired U.S. Army Colonel

=== Results ===
Republican primary results by county: Map legend: Keyes—20–30%; Keyes—30–40%; Keyes—40–50%; Keyes—50–60%; Keyes—60–70%; Cassilly—60–70%

Republican primary second place results by county: Map legend: Cassilly; Hopkins; Keyes; Klima; Meredith; Pierpont; Sobhani; Songer; Zarwell

Republican primary results
Party	Candidate	Votes	%
Republican	Alan Keyes	95,831	45.94%
Republican	Martha Scanlan Klima	20,758	9.95%
Republican	Joseph I. Cassilly	16,091	7.71%
Republican	Ross Z. Pierpont	12,658	6.07%
Republican	S. Rob Sobhani	12,423	5.96%
Republican	John J. Bishop, Jr.	9,451	4.53%
Republican	Eugene R. Zarwell	6,535	3.13%
Republican	James Henry Berry	6,282	3.01%
Republican	Romie Allen Songer	6,030	2.89%
Republican	Joyce Friend-Nalepka	5,835	2.80%
Republican	Edward Robert Shannon	4,578	2.19%
Republican	Scott L. Meredith	4,372	2.10%
Republican	Stuart Hopkins	3,717	1.78%
Republican	Herman J. Hannan	2,771	1.33%
Republican	William H. Krehnbrink	1,258	0.60%
Total votes		208,590	100.00%

== General election ==
=== Candidates ===
- Alan Keyes (R), former Assistant Secretary of State for International Organization Affairs
- Barbara Mikulski (D), incumbent U.S. Senator

=== Results ===
1992 United States Senate election in Maryland
Party	Candidate	Votes	%	±%
Democratic	Barbara Mikulski (incumbent)	1,307,610	71.02%	+10.33%
Republican	Alan Keyes	533,688	28.98%	−10.33%
Total votes		1,841,298	100.00%	N/A
Democratic hold				

=== Results by county ===
County	Barbara A. Mikulski Democratic		Alan Keyes Republican		Write-Ins Independent		Margin		Total Votes Cast
County	#	%	#	%	#	%	#	%	Total Votes Cast
Allegany	16872	64.71%	9199	35.28%	1	0.00%	7673	29.43%	26072
Anne Arundel	121290	67.01%	59512	32.88%	195	0.11%	61778	34.13%	180997
Baltimore (City)	196086	86.79%	29834	13.20%	23	0.01%	166252	73.58%	225943
Baltimore (County)	208164	70.92%	85374	29.08%	1	0.00%	122790	41.83%	293539
Calvert	11980	60.62%	7781	39.38%	0	0.00%	4199	21.25%	19761
Caroline	4622	64.61%	2531	35.38%	1	0.01%	2091	29.23%	7154
Carroll	30495	56.68%	23293	43.30%	11	0.02%	7202	13.39%	53799
Cecil	14744	63.77%	8374	36.22%	2	0.01%	6370	27.55%	23120
Charles	20053	61.71%	12439	38.28%	2	0.01%	7614	23.43%	32494
Dorchester	6346	69.65%	2765	30.35%	0	0.00%	3581	39.30%	9111
Frederick	36788	58.53%	26055	41.45%	11	0.02%	10733	17.08%	62854
Garrett	3473	40.85%	5028	59.15%	0	0.00%	-1555	-18.29%	8501
Harford	51096	64.62%	27966	35.37%	4	0.01%	23130	29.25%	79066
Howard	65681	67.47%	31664	32.52%	9	0.01%	34017	34.94%	97354
Kent	4550	72.43%	1732	27.57%	0	0.00%	2818	44.86%	6282
Montgomery	247505	69.99%	105997	29.97%	126	0.04%	141508	40.02%	353628
Prince George's	180129	78.92%	48093	21.07%	27	0.01%	132036	57.85%	228249
Queen Anne's	8079	64.67%	4414	35.33%	0	0.00%	3665	29.34%	12493
St. Mary's	13943	64.87%	7541	35.09%	9	0.04%	6402	29.79%	21493
Somerset	4565	69.75%	1970	30.10%	10	0.15%	2595	39.65%	6545
Talbot	7437	65.20%	3966	34.77%	4	0.04%	3471	30.43%	11407
Washington	24499	61.63%	15240	38.34%	11	0.03%	9259	23.29%	39750
Wicomico	17713	67.19%	8651	32.81%	0	0.00%	9062	34.37%	26364
Worcester	11500	72.93%	4269	27.07%	0	0.00%	7231	45.86%	15769
Total	1307610	71.00%	533688	28.98%	447	0.02%	773922	42.02%	1841745

==== Counties that flipped from Republican to Democratic ====
- Allegany
- Caroline
- Carroll
- Cecil
- Dorchester
- Frederick
- Queen Anne's
- Somerset
- Talbot
- Washington
- Wicomico
- Worcester

== See also ==
- 1992 United States Senate elections
- 1992 United States elections
