= Select Portfolio Servicing =

American loan servicing company

Select Portfolio Servicing, Inc.
- Formerly: Fairbanks Capital Corp. (1989-2004)
- Founded: 1989; 37 years ago
- Key people: Randhir Gandhi (CEO and president)
- Parent: Fairbanks Holding (1989-2004); SPS Holding Corp. (2004-2005); Credit Suisse First Boston (2005-2006); Credit Suisse/UBS (2006 - 2024); Sixth Street (2024 - present)
- Website: spservicing.com

Select Portfolio Servicing, Inc. (SPS) is a loan servicing company founded in 1989 as Fairbanks Capital Corp. with operations in Salt Lake City, Utah and Jacksonville, Florida.

== History ==
Select Portfolio Servicing was created as a Utah company in 1989. Filings with both the Utah Secretary of State and the U.S. Securities and Exchange Commission (SEC) confirm this. Filings with the Utah SOS and SEC would more accurately confirm that Fairbanks Capital Corp. was created as a Utah company in 1989.

Fairbanks Holding (the parent company of Fairbanks Capital) was owned in part by PMI Group, Inc., and bond guaranty firm Financial Security Assurance.

In November 2003, Fairbanks Capital Corp. and Fairbanks Capital Holding Corp. agreed to pay $40 million to settle with the FTC and the U.S. Department of Housing and Urban Development (HUD), which charged them with engaging in a number of unfair, deceptive, and illegal practices in the servicing of subprime mortgage loans. The Commission distributed the $40 million as redress to affected consumers. The settlement also imposed a number of specific limitations on Fairbanks’s ability to charge fees and engage in certain practices when servicing mortgage loans.

Fairbanks changed its name to Select Portfolio Servicing, Inc. effective June 30, 2004 according to its Articles of Amendment. Around the same time Fairbanks Holding renamed itself to SPS Holding Corp.

In 2005, Select Portfolio Servicing was purchased by Credit Suisse, a financial services company, headquartered in Zürich, Switzerland. According to a Securities and Exchange Commission report (CFN: 1-6862) filed August 12, 2005, Credit Suisse First Boston (USA), Inc. now known as Credit Suisse, purchased Select Portfolio Servicing and its parent holding company for $144.4 million. Credit Suisse's Investment Banking Strategy included "the acquisition of Select Portfolio Servicing, a mortgage servicing company."

In 2007, the FTC conducted a review of Select Portfolio Servicing’s compliance with certain aspects of the 2003 settlement. The FTC and Select Portfolio Servicing negotiated and agreed to several modifications of the settlement. HUD has also agreed to these changes.

As of July 2020, Select Portfolio Servicing's current CEO and President is Randhir Gandhi.

As of April 30, 2025 and after the failure of Credit Suisse and acquisition by UBS, the company was sold to Sixth Street, Davidson Kempner and a "consortium" of Wall Street loan owners.

Current information on regulatory actions, state regulators, license status, and Mortgage Loan Officers (MLO) can be found at the National Mortgage Licensing System.

== See also ==
- Subprime lending
